= List of airports in New Caledonia =

This is a list of airports in New Caledonia, sorted by location.

New Caledonia (French: Nouvelle-Calédonie) is an overseas territory (territoire d'outre-mer or TOM) of France, made up of a main island (Grande Terre) and several smaller islands. It is located in the region of Melanesia in the southwest Pacific.

== Airports ==
ICAO location identifiers are linked to each airport's Aeronautical Information Publication (AIP), which are available online in Portable Document Format (PDF) from the French Service d'information aéronautique (SIA). Locations shown in bold are as per the airport's AIP page. Most airports give two locations: the first is the city served, second is the city where the airport is located.

Airport names shown in bold indicate the airport has scheduled service on commercial airlines.

| City served / Location | ICAO | IATA | Airport name | Usage | Total passengers 2011 |
|---|---|---|---|---|---|
| **Belep** / Waala | NWWC | BMY | **Île Art – Waala Airport** (Belep Islands Airport) | Restricted | |
| **Bourail** / Poé | NWWB | | Bourail – Poé Airport | Public | |
| **Canala** | NWWX | | Canala Airport | Public | |
| Hienghène | NWWI | HNG | Hienghène Airport | | |
| Houaïlou | NWWH | | Nesson Airport | | |
| **Île des Pins** / Moue | NWWE | ILP | **Île des Pins Airport** | Public | 80,554 |
| Île Ouen | NWWO | | Île Ouen/Edmond Cane Airport | | |
| **Koné** | NWWD | KNQ | **Koné Airport** | Public | |
| **Koumac** | NWWK | KOC | **Koumac Airport** | Public | |
| **La Foa** / Oua Tom | NWWT | | La Foa – Oua Tom Airport | Public | |
| **Lifou** / Ouanaham | NWWL | LIF | **Ouanaham Airport** | Public | 135,132 |
| **Maré** / La Roche | NWWR | MEE | **Maré Airport** | Public | 60,678 |
| Nepoui | NWWQ | PDC | Mueo/Nickel Airport | | |
| Nouméa / **La Tontouta** | NWWW | NOU | **Nouméa – La Tontouta International Airport** | Public | 492,830 |
| Nouméa / **Magenta** | NWWM | GEA | **Nouméa Magenta Airport** | Public | 344,141 |
| **Ouvéa** / Ouloup | NWWV | UVE | **Ouvéa Airport** | Public | 66,819 |
| **Poum** / Malabou | NWWP | PUV | Malabou Airport | Public | |
| **Tiga** | NWWA | TGJ | **Tiga Airport** | Public | |
| **Touho** | NWWU | TOU | **Touho Airport** | Public | |

== See also ==
- Transport in New Caledonia
- List of airports in France
- List of airports by ICAO code: N#NW – New Caledonia
- Wikipedia: Airline destination lists: Oceania#New Caledonia (France)
