= Air Oceania =

New Caledonian airline

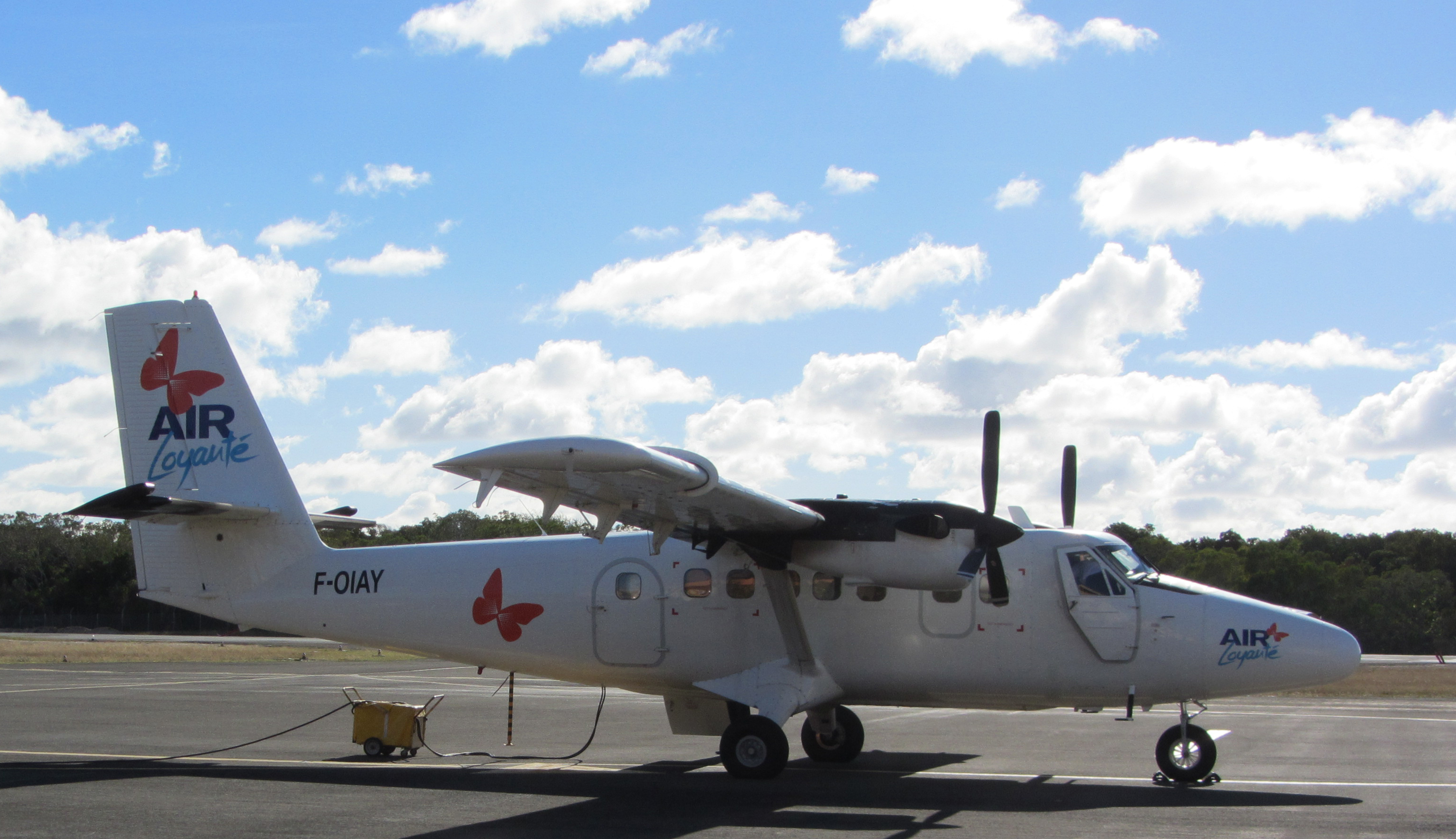
IATA	ICAO	Call sign
—	RLY	—
- Hubs: Nouméa Magenta
- Secondary hubs: Lifou
- Fleet size: 1
- Destinations: 10
- Website: www.air-loyaute.nc

Air Oceania is a French airline company which operates in New Caledonia. It is the main airline service for the Loyalty Islands and provides scheduled, medivac and charter services. Air Loyauté rebranded as Air Oceania and launched its inaugural flight to Tiga on May 19, 2025.

== Destinations ==
Air Oceania flies to and from 5 domestic destinations.

Country/territory	City	Airport	Notes
New Caledonia	Noumea	Noumea Magenta Airport	Hub
New Caledonia	Koumac	Koumac Airport	Terminated
New Caledonia	Belep	Ile Art - Waala Airport	Terminated
New Caledonia	Touho	Touho Airport	Terminated
New Caledonia	Mare	Mare Airport	
New Caledonia	Tiga	Tiga Airport	
New Caledonia	Lifou	Ouanaham Airport	Secondary hub
New Caledonia	Ouvea	Ouvea Airport	
Wallis and Futuna	Wallis	Hihifo Airport	Terminated
Wallis and Futuna	Futuna	Pointe Vele Airport	Terminated

== Fleet ==
=== Current fleet ===
The Air Oceania fleet consists of the following aircraft (as of June 2025):

Aircraft	Total	Orders	Passengers	Notes
P2012 STOL	1		9	
Total	1	—		

=== Former fleet ===
Aircraft	Total	Passengers	Notes
DHC-6 Twin Otter	3	19	
B200 Raisbeck	2	8	
Total	5		
