= Noumea Airport =

Noumea Airport may refer to:

- La Tontouta International Airport - the largest airport in Nouméa, New Caledonia, France
- Nouméa Magenta Airport - the domestic airport in Nouméa, New Caledonia, France
