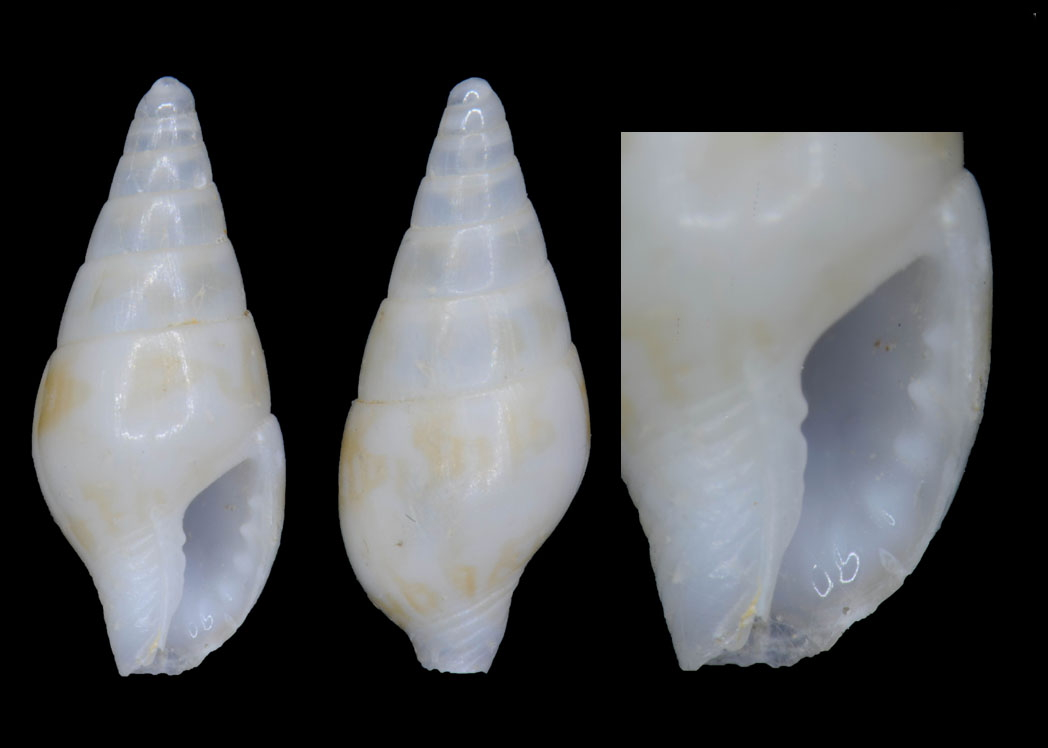
- Shells of Mitrella maculafasciata (holotype in MNHN, Paris)

Scientific classification
- Kingdom: Animalia
- Phylum: Mollusca
- Class: Gastropoda
- Subclass: Caenogastropoda
- Order: Neogastropoda
- Superfamily: Buccinoidea
- Family: Columbellidae
- Genus: Mitrella
- Species: M. maculafasciata

Binomial name
- Mitrella maculafasciata K. Monsecour & D. Monsecour, 2016

= Mitrella maculafasciata =

Species of gastropod

Mitrella maculafasciata is a species of sea snail, a marine gastropod mollusk in the family Columbellidae, the dove snails.

== Description ==
The length of the shell attains 7.5 mm.

== Distribution ==
This marine species occurs off the Loyalty Ridge, off Lifou Island.The shell is spire-shaped and features a whitish or cream background color with distinct dark brown patches or mottled patterns. As a member of the family Columbellidae, commonly known as dove snails, it is typically a small marine gastropod.
