= TGJ =

TGJ may refer to:

- TGJ, the IATA code for Tiga Airport, Tiga Island, New Caledonia
- tgj, the ISO 639-3 code for Tagin language, India
- The Gambling Journal, a trade journal for the gaming industry.
