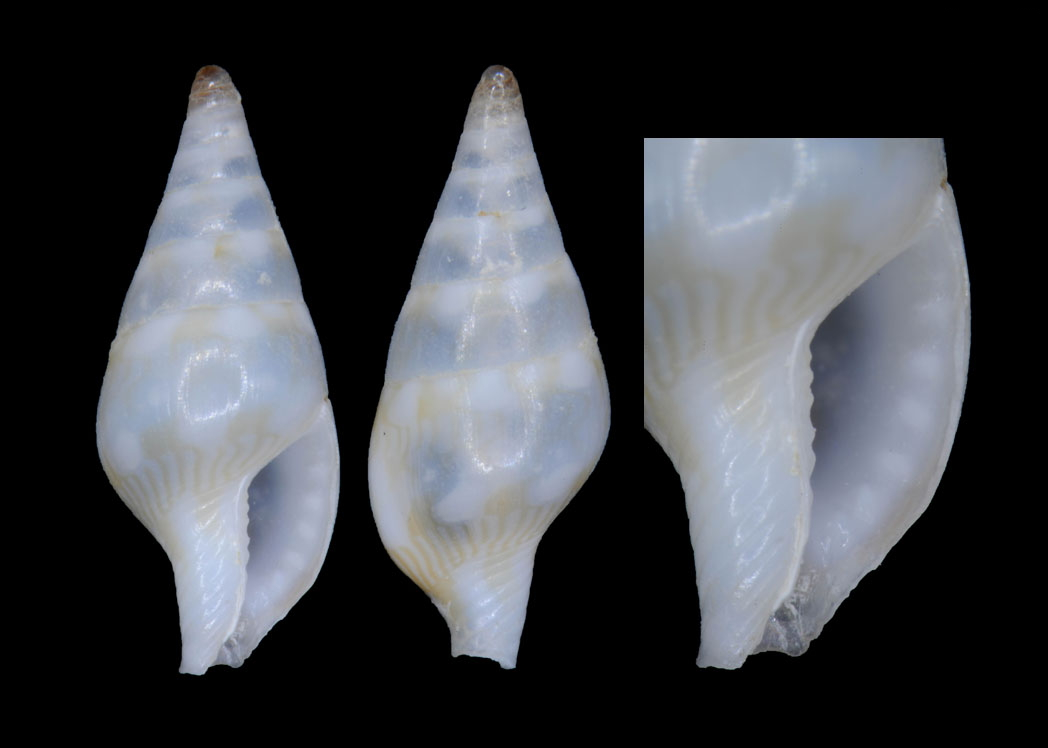
- Shells of Mitrella prolixa (holotype in MNHN, Paris)

Scientific classification
- Kingdom: Animalia
- Phylum: Mollusca
- Class: Gastropoda
- Subclass: Caenogastropoda
- Order: Neogastropoda
- Superfamily: Buccinoidea
- Family: Columbellidae
- Genus: Mitrella
- Species: M. prolixa

Binomial name
- Mitrella prolixa K. Monsecour & D. Monsecour, 2016

= Mitrella prolixa =

Species of gastropod

Mitrella prolixa is a species of sea snail, a marine gastropod mollusk in the family Columbellidae, the dove snails.

== Description ==
The length of the shell attains 8.9 mm.

== Distribution ==
This marine species occurs off the Loyalty Ridge, off Lifou Island.
