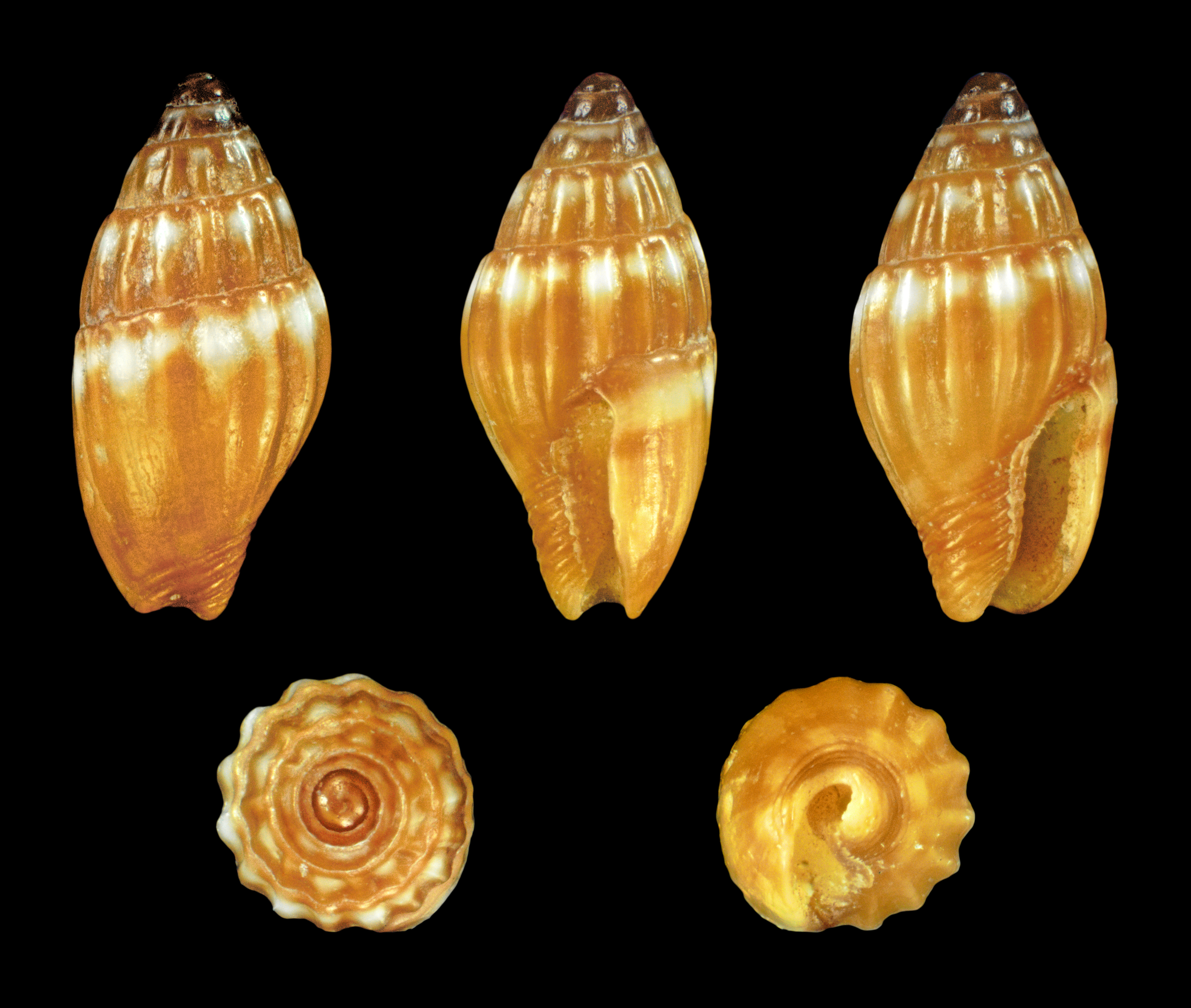
- Shell of Zafra succinea

Scientific classification
- Kingdom: Animalia
- Phylum: Mollusca
- Class: Gastropoda
- Subclass: Caenogastropoda
- Order: Neogastropoda
- Superfamily: Buccinoidea
- Family: Columbellidae
- Genus: Zafra
- Species: Z. succinea

Binomial name
- Zafra succinea (Hervier, 1899)

Synonyms
- Columbella succinea Hervier, 1900 (original combination)

= Zafra succinea =

Species of gastropod

Zafra succinea is a species of sea snail in the family Columbellidae, the dove snails.

== Taxonomy ==
Treated as a synonym of Zafra troglodytes (Souverbie, 1866) by Sleurs (1987).

== Description ==
The length of the shell attains 5.7 mm and reaches a maximum diameter of 2 mm.

(Original description in Latin) The shell is very small, somewhat inflated and ovate in form, moderately solid, smooth, and glossy, with a pale amber hue that is bordered just below the suture by an opaque white band. It is composed of six to seven whorls, of which the first three are embryonic, rounded, smooth, and horn-like in texture. The subsequent whorls slope with a flattened convexity and are separated by a rather thick suture; they show longitudinal folds and, across the sutures, a raised ridge that connects the ribs. These small ribs are somewhat wavy, fairly thick, and broader toward the base.

The body whorl exceeds half the total length of the shell; it is inflated and gently rounded in convexity, becoming elongated and ridged near the base, and it terminates in a short, slightly recurved canal. The aperture is narrow and sinuous. The columella is concave above, somewhat straight in the middle, and indistinctly folded. The outer lip is simple, oblique, and somewhat flattened, sharp at the edge, and strongly indented just below the suture; within, it is thickened and distinctly furnished with small folds.

== Distribution ==
This marine species occurs off Lifou Island, Loyalty Islands and Papua New Guinea; also off the Philippines.
