= BMY (disambiguation) =

Bristol Myers Squibb (NYSE symbol BMY) is an American pharmaceutical company.

BMY or bmy may also refer to:

- Bloomsbury Publishing, a British publishing house, LSE symbol BMY
- Bowen McLaughlin York, a defense manufacturer merged to form United Defense
- Bramley railway station (Hampshire), England, station code BMY
- Île Art – Waala Airport, New Caledonia, IATA code BMY
- bmy, a retired ISO 639 language code for the Bemba language, later recognized as duplicating Buyu language
