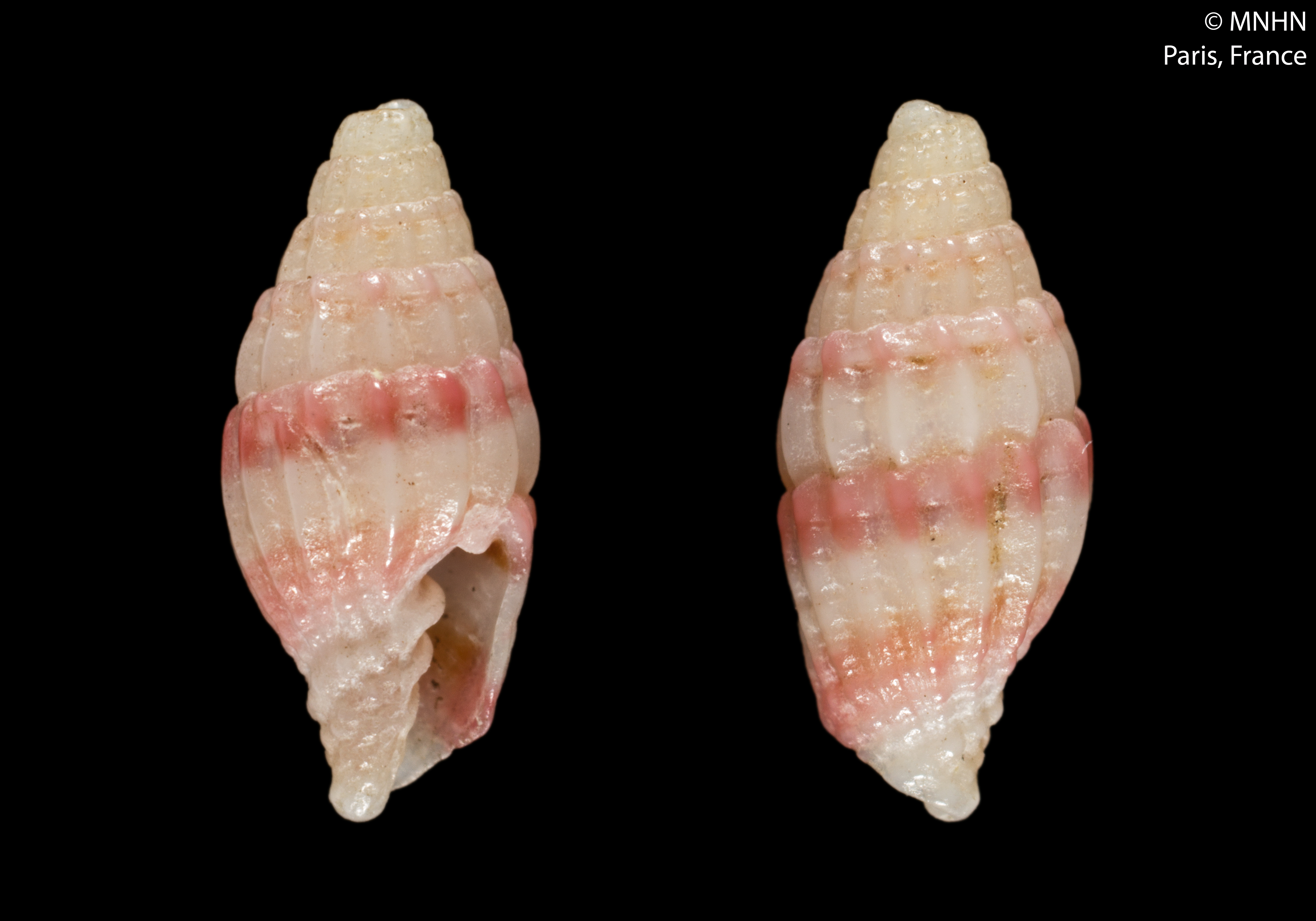

Scientific classification
- Kingdom: Animalia
- Phylum: Mollusca
- Class: Gastropoda
- Subclass: Caenogastropoda
- Order: Neogastropoda
- Family: Costellariidae
- Genus: Vexillum
- Species: V. roseotinctum

Binomial name
- Vexillum roseotinctum (Hervier, 1897)

SynonymsShell of Vexillum roseotinctum (lectotype at MNHN, Paris)
- Mitra (Pusia) roseotincta Hervier, 1897 · unaccepted (basionym); Vexillum (Pusia) roseotinctum (Hervier, 1897) ·

= Vexillum roseotinctum =

Species of gastropod

Vexillum roseotinctum is a species of small sea snail, marine gastropod mollusk in the family Costellariidae, the ribbed miters.

== Description ==
The length of the shell attains 8 mm, its diameter 3.5 mm.

== Distribution ==
This marine species occurs of Lifou Island, Loyalty Islands.
