= KNQ =

KNQ or knq may refer to:

- Kintaq language (ISO 639-3: knq), an Austroasiatic language spoken in Malaysia and Thailand
- Koné Airport (IATA: KNQ), an airport serving Koné, New Caledonia
