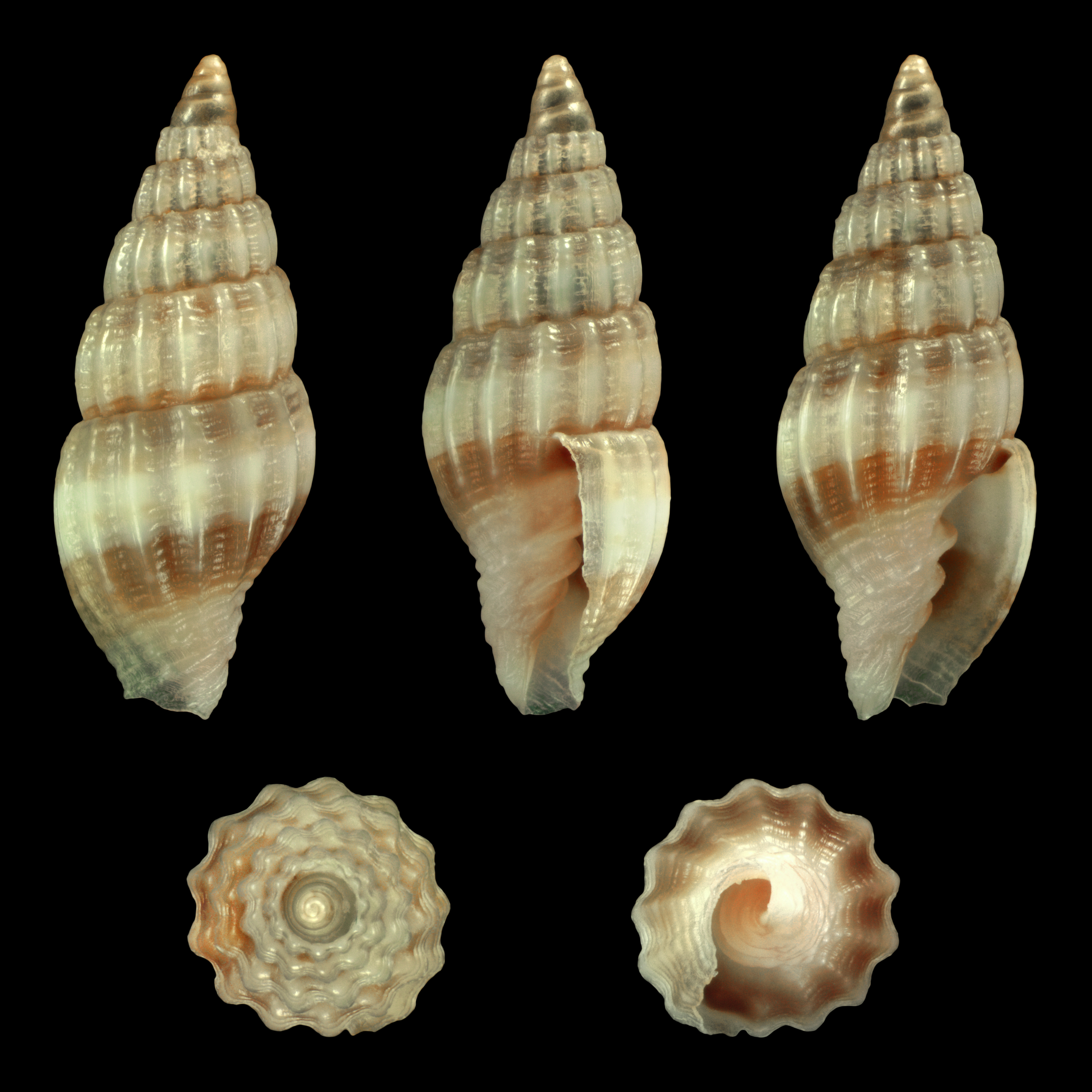
- Shell of Vexillum diutenerum

Scientific classification
- Kingdom: Animalia
- Phylum: Mollusca
- Class: Gastropoda
- Subclass: Caenogastropoda
- Order: Neogastropoda
- Superfamily: Turbinelloidea
- Family: Costellariidae
- Genus: Vexillum
- Species: V. diutenerum

Binomial name
- Vexillum diutenerum (Hervier, 1897)

Synonyms
- Mitra (Pusia) diutenera Hervier, 1897 (original combination); Mitra eruda sensu Dall MS J. Cate, 1963; Vexillum (Pusia) diutenerum (Hervier, 1897)

= Vexillum diutenerum =

Species of gastropod

Vexillum diutenerum is a species of small sea snail, a marine gastropod mollusk in the family Costellariidae, the ribbed miters. It was first described by French malacologist Joseph Hervier in 1897 based on specimens from New Caledonia.

== Description ==
The shell of Vexillum diutenerum is slender and fusiform, with an average length of about 15 mm. It is characterized by fine axial ribs and spiral grooves, giving it a ribbed appearance. The coloration varies from light brown to reddish with lighter bands or markings. The aperture is narrow and elongate, and the outer lip is slightly thickened.

== Distribution ==
This marine species is found in the western Pacific Ocean. Its known distribution includes:

- Waters off Lifou Island, New Caledonia
- Off the Philippines, where it has been collected at depths of around 80 metres by dredging operations
- Reported from other localities in Melanesia, although specific records are limited.

== Taxonomy ==
Vexillum diutenerum was originally described as Mitra (Pusia) diutenera by Hervier in 1897. It was later placed in the genus Vexillum under the subgenus Pusia, based on shell morphology and radular characteristics. Some historical confusion exists due to misidentification with related species like Mitra eruda in unpublished manuscripts by Dall.

== Ecology ==
Like other members of the Costellariidae, Vexillum diutenerum is likely carnivorous, feeding on small invertebrates. It inhabits sandy or rubble substrates at moderate depths. Detailed ecological studies on this species are lacking.
