= Maré Airport =

Airport in Maré, New Caledonia

- IATA: MEE; ICAO: NWWR

Summary
- Airport type: Public
- Location: Maré
- Elevation AMSL: 141 ft (43 m)
- Coordinates: 21°28′54″S 168°02′15″E

Map
- Location of airport in New Caledonia

Runways
Direction	Length		Surface
Direction	ft	m	Surface
	3,281	1,250	Paved
- Source : Great Circle Mapper

Maré Airport (IATA: MEE, ICAO: NWWR) is an airport in Maré, New Caledonia.

== Airlines and destinations ==
Airlines	Destinations
Air Calédonie	Lifou, Nouméa–Magenta, Nouméa–Tontouta, Ouvéa, Tiga
Air Oceania	Lifou, Nouméa–Magenta
