= Île Art – Waala Airport =

Airport in New Caledonia

Île Art – Waala Airport Belep Islands Airport
- IATA: BMY; ICAO: NWWC

Summary
- Airport type: Public
- Serves: Belep, New Caledonia
- Elevation AMSL: 305 ft / 93 m
- Coordinates: 19°43′14″S 163°39′40″E

Map
- Location of airport in New Caledonia

Runways
Direction	Length		Surface
Direction	m	ft	Surface
09/27	600	1,969	asphalt
- AIS France

Ile Art – Waala Airport (also known as Belep Islands Airport)(IATA: BMY, ICAO: NWWC) is an airport on Art Island (Île d'Art), 1.9 kilometres (1.2 miles) southeast of Waala, in the Belep commune, New Caledonia.

== Airlines and destinations ==
Airlines	Destinations
Air Calédonie	Koumac, Nouméa–Magenta
