= Ouanaham Airport =

Airport in Lifou Island, New Caledonia

- IATA: LIF; ICAO: NWWL

Summary
- Airport type: Public
- Serves: Lifou
- Location: Lifou Island
- Coordinates: 20°46′30″S 167°14′25″E

Map
- Location of airport in New Caledonia

Runways
Direction	Length		Surface
Direction	m	ft	Surface
12/30	1,250	4,101	Asphalt

Statistics (2018)
- Passengers: 178,425
- Passenger traffic change: ▲5.4%
- Sources: Service de l'information aéronautique, Aeroport.fr

Ouanaham Airport (IATA: LIF, ICAO: NWWL) is an airport serving Lifou, Lifou Island, New Caledonia.

== Airlines and destinations ==
Airlines	Destinations
Air Calédonie	Maré, Nouméa–Magenta, Nouméa–Tontouta, Ouvéa
Air Oceania	Maré, Nouméa–Magenta,, Ouvéa, Tiga
