= La Tontouta International Airport =

Tontouta International Airport Aéroport de Nouméa - La Tontouta
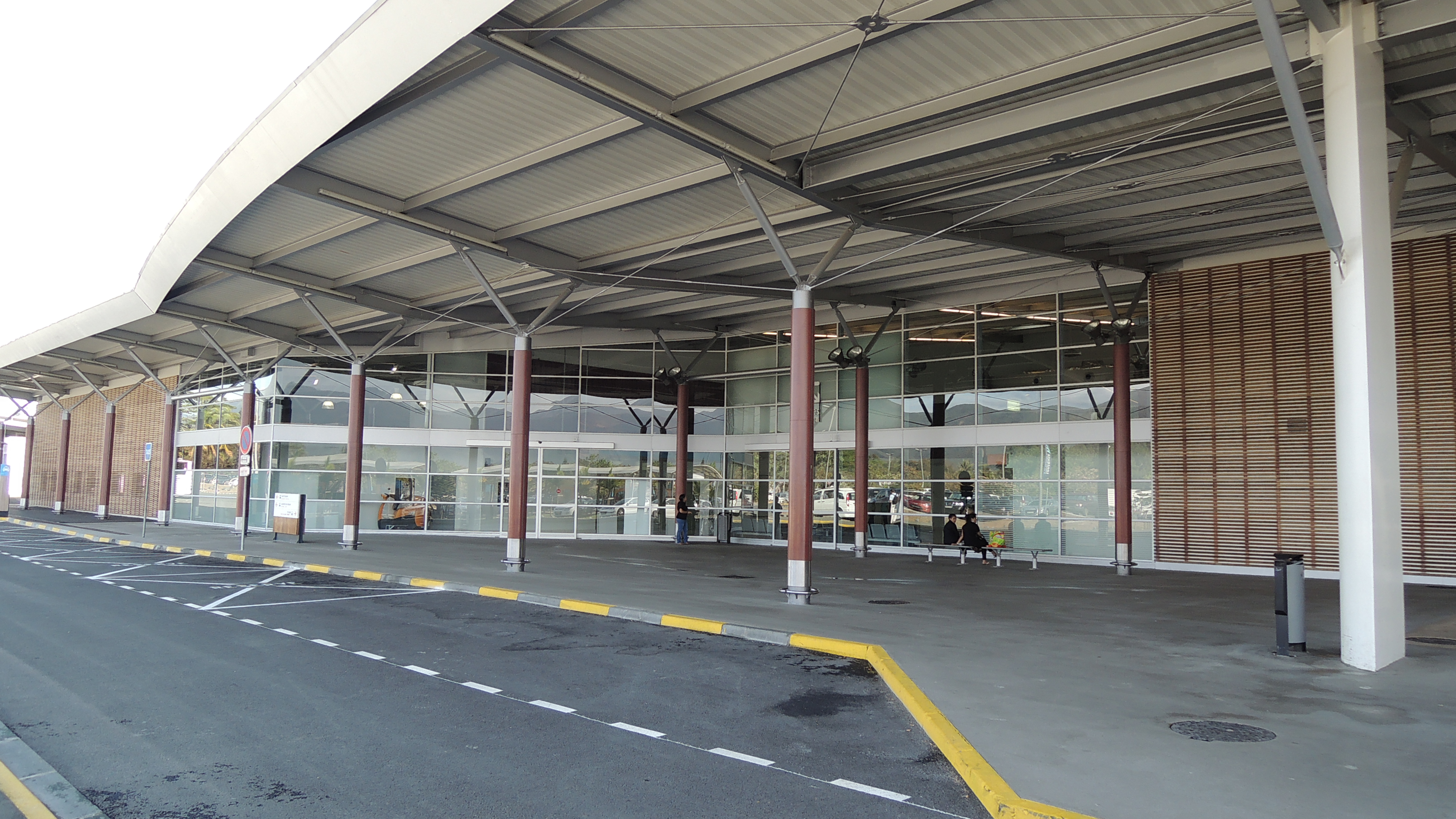
- IATA: NOU; ICAO: NWWW

Summary
- Airport type: Military/public
- Operator: New Caledonia Chamber of Commerce & Industry
- Serves: Nouméa
- Location: Païta, New Caledonia, France
- Hub for: Aircalin
- Elevation AMSL: 52 ft (16 m)
- Coordinates: 22°00′59″S 166°12′58″E
- Website: www.aeroports.cci.nc/en/tontouta/

Map
- Location of airport in Païta, New Caledonia NOU/NWWW (Oceania)

Runways
Direction	Length		Surface
Direction	m	ft	Surface
11/29	3,250	10,663	Asphalt

Statistics (2024)
- Passengers: 359,419
- Passenger traffic change: ▼27%
- Aircraft movements: 3,176
- Aircraft movements change: ▼9.7%
- Source: Aeroport.fr

La Tontouta International Airport, also known as Nouméa – La Tontouta International Airport (French: Aéroport de Nouméa - La Tontouta; IATA: NOU, ICAO: NWWW), is the main international airport in New Caledonia, an overseas collectivity of France in the southwest Pacific Ocean, as well as the military base (Base aérienne 186 Nouméa) for the French Air Force based in New Caledonia.

The airport is located in the municipality of Païta, approximately 37 km (23 mi) northwest of Nouméa. The airport is regularly served by four airlines, including Aircalin, which is based at the airport. In 2017, 529,349 passengers used the airport.

La Tontouta International Airport previously served only international flights, while Nouméa Magenta Airport, within the city of Nouméa, served domestic flights. In March 2026, all domestic services from Magenta were terminated and moved to La Tontouta; however, on 19 May 2026, Air Oceania moved its flights back to Magenta.

== History ==
=== World War II ===
Tontouta Air Base was originally constructed by the United States Navy's Seabees. THe base played a role during the Pacific War of the Second World War. The base had two runways numbered 3/21 and 11/29. The base reverted to French control after the war and today's remaining runway is aligned on 11/29.

United States Army Air Forces units based here included:

- 64th Troop Carrier Squadron operating Douglas C-47 Skytrains in 1943
- 67th Fighter Squadron operating Bell P-39 Airacobras from 17 March 1942 – 24 April 1943

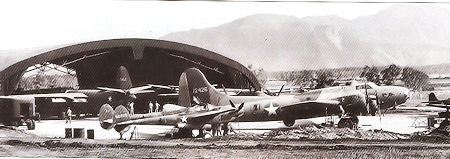
Boeing B-17E Flying Fortress of the 11th Bomb Group, 43d Bomb Squadron at Tontouta in August 1942

United States Marine Corps units based here included:

- VMF-212 operating Grumman F4F Wildcats
- VMO-251 operating Grumman F4F Wildcats from June–August 1942

=== Terminal expansion ===
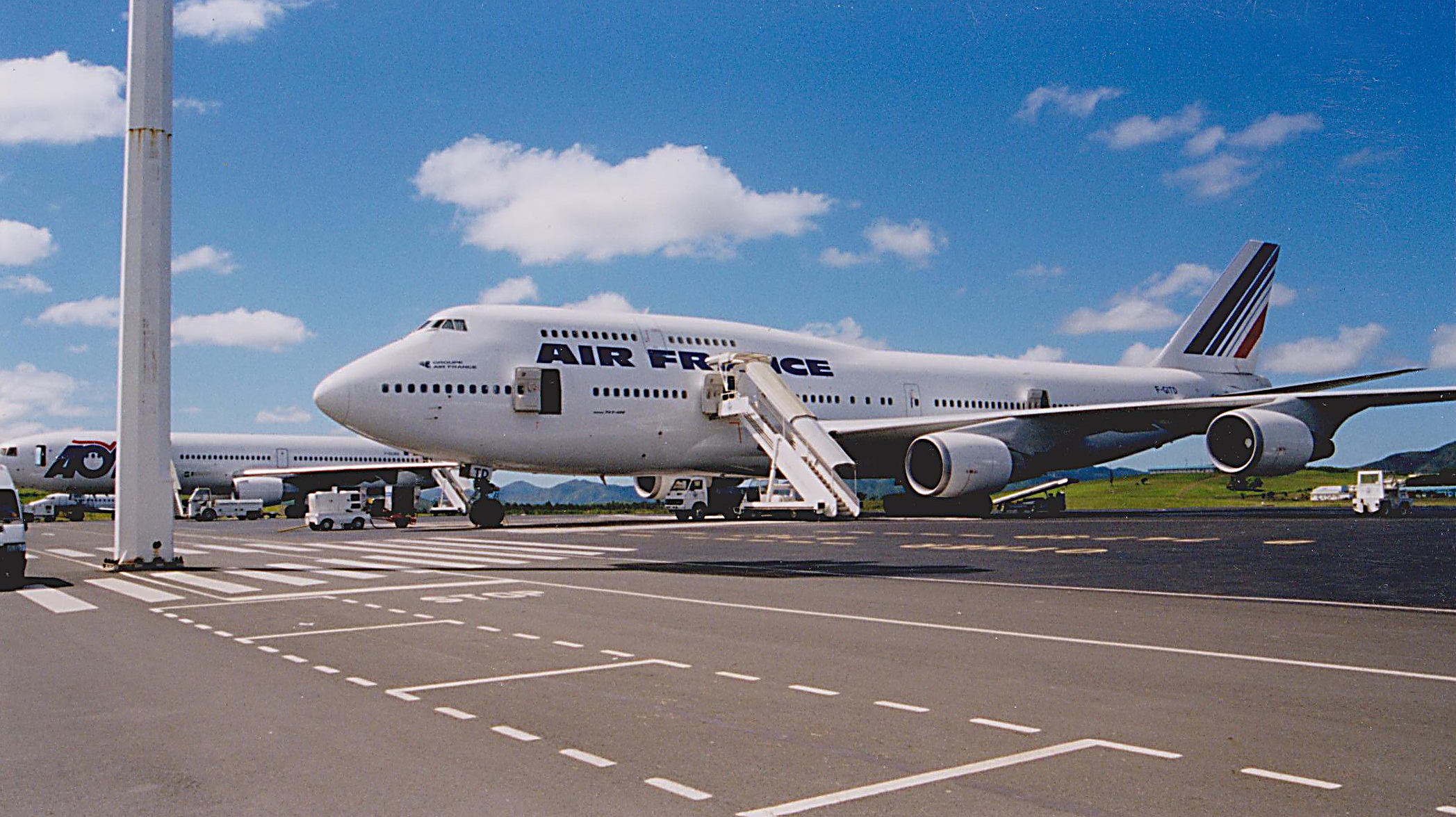
An Air France Boeing 747-400 at La Tontouta Airport in February 2000

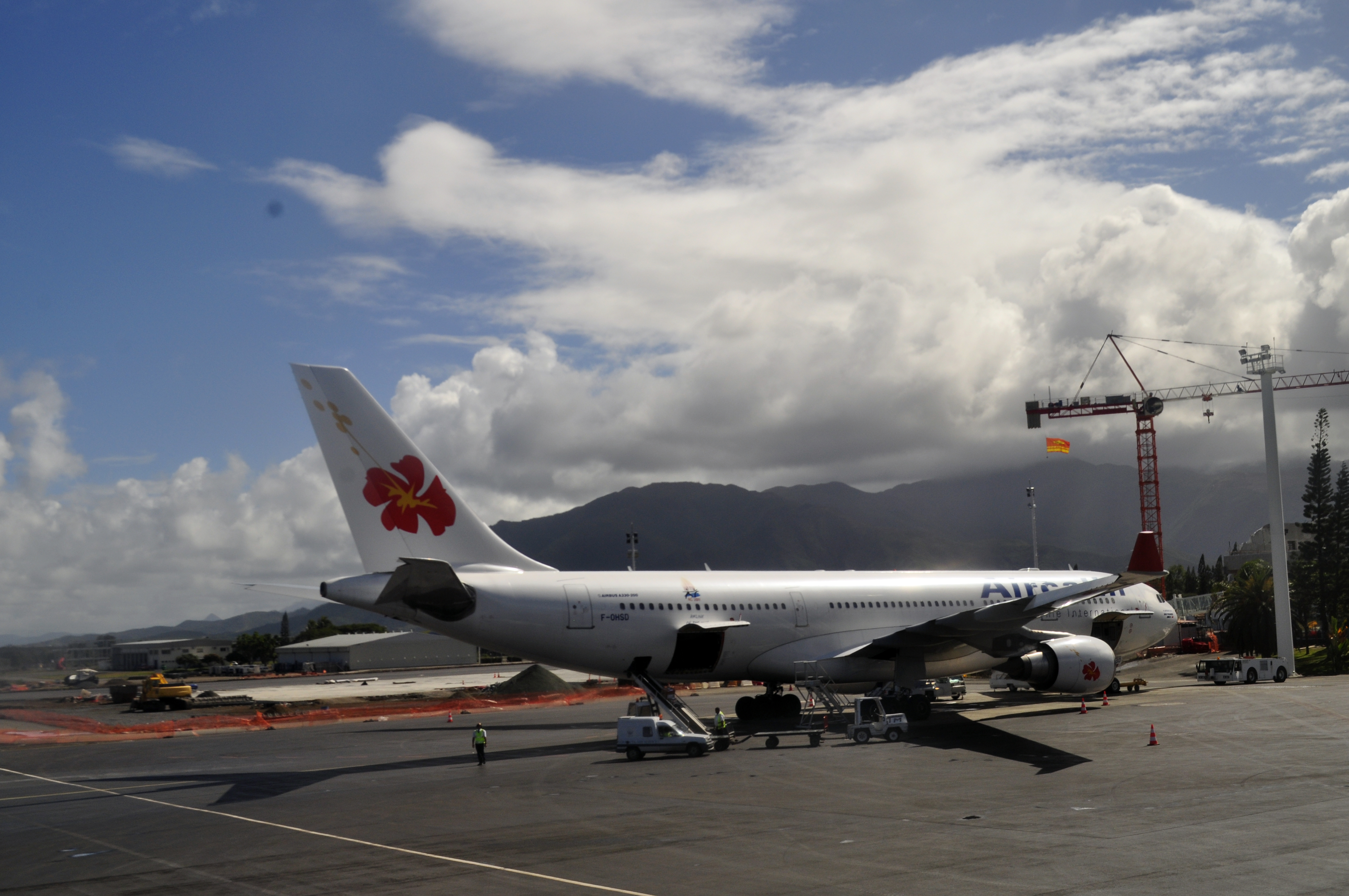
An Air Calin Airbus A330-200 at the airport in July 2011, with the terminal redevelopment underway in the background

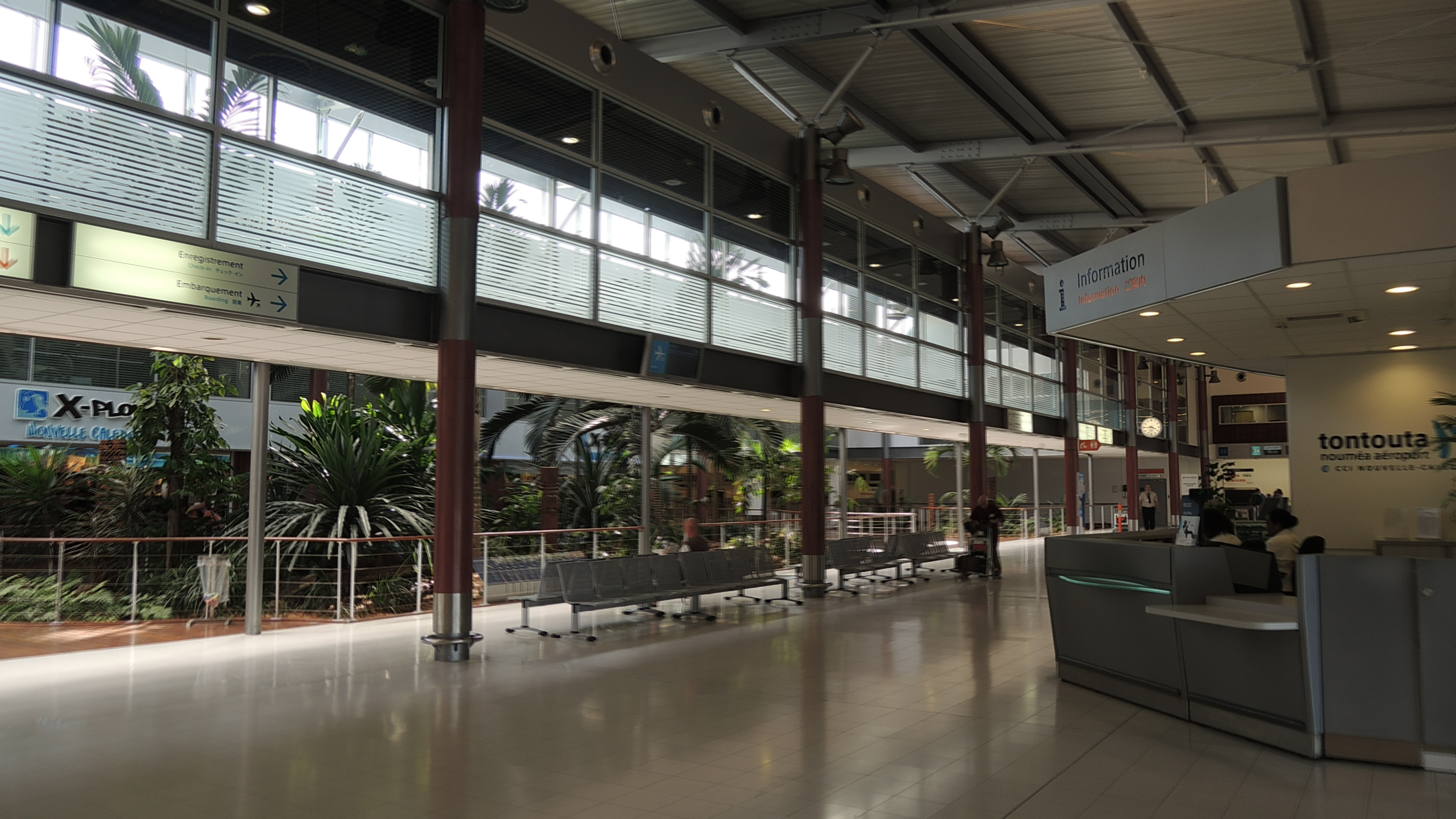
A garden on the ground floor of the terminal

A major expansion of the airport's terminal was completed in 2012 after several years of work. The project resulted in a significant increase in the terminal's size and included a new arrivals area, a larger check-in area and the installation of two jetbridges. The terminal now has five stands capable of handling commercial jet aircraft, two of which are served by the new airbridges and three of which utilise stairs to access the aircraft. In addition, the airport has several more stands designed to handle smaller aircraft.

=== 2024 New Caledonia unrest ===
In response to the 2024 New Caledonia unrest, Nouméa's international airport was closed between 14 and 21 May 2024. Due to the airport's closure, Air New Zealand cancelled its flights to Nouméa scheduled for 18 and 20 May.

=== Closure of Magenta ===
On 2 March 2026, Noumea Magenta Airport was closed to passenger traffic and Air Calédonie and Air Oceania moved their domestic operations to La Tontouta. However, destination airports in the Loyalty Islands were blocked in protest, forcing the suspension of flights and pushing Air Calédonie into receivership.

In May, Air Calédonie resumed flights to Île des Pins from La Tontouta, while Air Oceania restarted operations at Magenta.

== Airlines and destinations ==
The following airlines operate regular scheduled and charter flights in Nouméa:

Airlines	Destinations
Air Calédonie	Île-des-Pins, Lifou, Maré, Ouvéa, Port Vila
Air New Zealand	Auckland
Aircalin	Auckland, Bangkok–Suvarnabhumi, Brisbane, Nadi, Papeete, Paris–Charles de Gaulle, Port Vila, Singapore, Sydney, Wallis Island
Fiji Airways	Nadi
Qantas	Sydney
QantasLink	Brisbane

== Statistics ==
Nouméa - La Tontouta
Year	Passengers	Freight (tonnes)	Commercial aircraft movements
2000	359,839	5,244	3,111
2001	348,025	5,061	3,118
2002	359,293	5,094	3,349
2003	371,247	5,197	3,128
2004	388,308	5,200	3,330
2005	409,096	5,566	3,254
2006	415,813	5,451	3,290
2007	445,305	5,606	3,440
2008	457,387	6,220	3,661
2009	462,698	5,809	3,730
2010	479,803	6,221	3,797
2011	492,830	6,299	3,787
2012	486,171	5,632	3,814
2013	476,174	4,953	3,701
2014	479,843	4,870	3,822
2015	497,718	4,811	3,891
2016	515,166	4,407	4,052
2017	529,349	4,277	3,749
2018	538,791	4,049	3,746
2019	569,901	4,089	3,989
2020	166,198	3,280	1,509
2021	53,608	3,646	906
2022	320,333	4,024	2,261
2023	492,640	3,192	3,517
2024	359,419	2,840	3,176

== See also ==
- Nouméa Magenta Airport, the domestic airport for Nouméa
