= Evanès Boula =

New Caledonian chief

Evanès Boula is the current chief of Lössi and high chief of Lifou in the Loyalty Islands of New Caledonia. His is one of three Kanak chieftaincies on the island of Lifou, the others being Gaïtcha and Wetr, and was established by the Boula dynasty prior to the arrival of French colonists. The high chieftaincy, which is always held by the chief of Lössi, reigns over 37 tribes on Lifou, as well as all tribes on Ouvéa. Among the tribes over which he rules, his word is law, and his power is absolute.

Evanès is the son of the previous high chief, Henri Boula, and Laurentine Naisseline, sister of the high chief of Maré. The elder chief reigned from 1963 until his abdication on 14 March 1999. Evanes officially succeeded his father on 13 June 1999. The ceremony was attended by some 5,000 people, including representatives of all the tribes, Lifou chiefs Pierre Zeula of Gaica and Paul Sihaze of Wetr, the President of the Loyalty Islands Province, and a delegation from Wallis and Futuna representing the King of 'Uvea.

Evanes is married to Chiristiane Automalo, who is Wallisian in origin.
