= Tiebaghi =

Coordinates: 20°26′41″S 164°13′2″E

Tiebaghi Mine
- Location within New Caledonia
- Location: Koumac, New Caledonia
- Products: Chromite
- Discovered: 1877

Tiebaghi is a mine and former village near Koumac, New Caledonia.

== History ==
Chromite ore was first discovered in 1877 as sparse blocks on top of Tiebaghi plateau at 580 m elevation. From 1902 to 1920 Cr ore was extracted in an open pit 100 m deep, 200 m wide. From 1927 the mine was operated underground and was the largest chromium mine in the world in 1941. BHP owned Tiebaghi and its director of operation was Raoul Bergman, from 1949 until 1952, while having an affair with the wife of one of its operation managers, Mr RL Petit.

An accident occurred in 1951, when two young engineers, Mr White and Mr Alexander, were killed by dynamite explosion. During a fist fight between Bergman and Petit, the director was badly injured and was sent to Nouméa for evaluation and treatment and then sent to Australia on board on a Qantas sea plane and with his new lady friend Josephine Petit. Incidentally Mrs Petit, who was the director of the school in Tiebaghi, left behind husband and six kids ranging from the age of 5 to 15. Mrs Bergman stayed in Tiebaghi for a short time and she also left New Caledonia soon after and returned to the United States when she died a short time later. The mine closed for the first time in 1962. Mining resumed in 1982 with a new access drift, 1.2 km long, which was opened from the NE flank of the massif to reach the base of the orebody. All operations ceased in 1990.

Tiébaghi mine belongs to a group of orebodies aligned parallel to the layering of peridotite host rock in a NW-SE direction and dipping about 70° to the SW. Tiebaghi mine produced about 54,000 tons per year. During World War II it produced about 4400 tons of nickel per year. A bulk of 3.27 Mt chromite ore has been extracted from Tiébaghi mine. From a maximum of 56 wt % Cr in 1907, the ore grade decreased by the end of the 80s to 30-45 wt % Cr_{2}O_{3} (Table 3). At that time it was enriched to > 50 % by a small concentration unit. The Cr mine was definitively closed in 1992; however, Tiebaghi Massif is currently mined for supergene nickel ore by Societe Le Nickel (SLN), a subsidiary corporation of French firm Eramet. the mining in New Caledonia is contributing to the endangerment of the New Caledonian marbled gecko.
