= Art Island =

Island in New Caledonia

Coordinates: 19°42′20″S 163°39′27″E

Art Island (Île d'Art) is the largest of the Belep Islands archipelago in New Caledonia. It has an area of 53 square kilometres (20 sq mi). Its chief settlement is Waala, which is also the capital of Belep commune.

== History ==
In August 2016, a large bushfire ravaged Art Island.
