= Koumac Airport =

Airport in New Caledonia

- IATA: KOC; ICAO: NWWK

Summary
- Airport type: Public
- Serves: Koumac, New Caledonia
- Elevation AMSL: 42 ft (13 m)
- Coordinates: 20°32′33″S 164°15′34″E

Map
- Location of airport in New Caledonia

Runways
Direction	Length		Surface
Direction	m	ft	Surface
06/24	1,102	3,616	Asphalt

Koumac Airport is an airport in Koumac, New Caledonia (IATA: KOC, ICAO: NWWK).

== History ==
The airstrip was expanded during World War II in order to support a fleet of B-17 bombers by the 810th American aviation battalion, which was one of the first two all-black engineering battalions of the war. The airstrip was used as a base from which targets in the Solomon Islands were bombed.

An Air Loyauté flight was hit by a projectile while landing at Koumac in 2010.

In 2023, the airport was used as a base for practice by a joint operation called Exercise Croix du Sud 2023 involving the militaries of 19 nations to prepare for a possible situation in which evacuation of the area due to war or natural disaster is ever necessary.

== Airlines and destinations ==
Air Calédonie connects Koumac Airport to Île Art – Waala Airport and Nouméa Magenta Airport.
