= Koné Airport =

Airport in New Caledonia

- IATA: KNQ; ICAO: NWWD

Summary
- Airport type: Public
- Operator: Direction Territoriale de l'Aviation Civile (DTAC)
- Serves: Koné, New Caledonia
- Elevation AMSL: 23 ft (7.0 m)
- Coordinates: 21°03′12″S 164°50′16″E

Map
- Location of airport in New Caledonia

Runways
Direction	Length		Surface
Direction	m	ft	Surface
09/27	1,000	3,280	Asphalt
- Sources: AIP France, DAFIF

Koné Airport (IATA: KNQ, ICAO: NWWD) is an airport serving Koné, a commune in the North Province of New Caledonia (French: Nouvelle-Calédonie), an overseas territory (territoire d'outre-mer) of France in the Pacific Ocean.

== Airlines and destinations ==
Air Calédonie connects Koné Airport to Nouméa Magenta Airport.
