= Touho Airport =

Airport in Touho, New Caledonia

- IATA: TOU; ICAO: NWWU

Summary
- Airport type: Public
- Location: Touho
- Elevation AMSL: 10 ft (3.0 m)
- Coordinates: 20°47′24″S 165°15′34″E

Map
- Location of airport in New Caledonia

Runways
| Direction | Length | | Surface |
| Direction | ft | m | Surface |
|---|---|---|---|
| 13/31 | 3,609 | 1,100 | Paved |
- Source : Great Circle Mapper

Touho Airport is an airport in Touho, New Caledonia (IATA: TOU, ICAO: NWWU).

== Airlines and destinations ==
Air Calédonie connects Touho Airport to Nouméa Magenta Airport.
