= Île des Pins Airport =

Airport in New Caledonia

Île des Pins Airport Aérodrome provincial Moue - Île des Pins
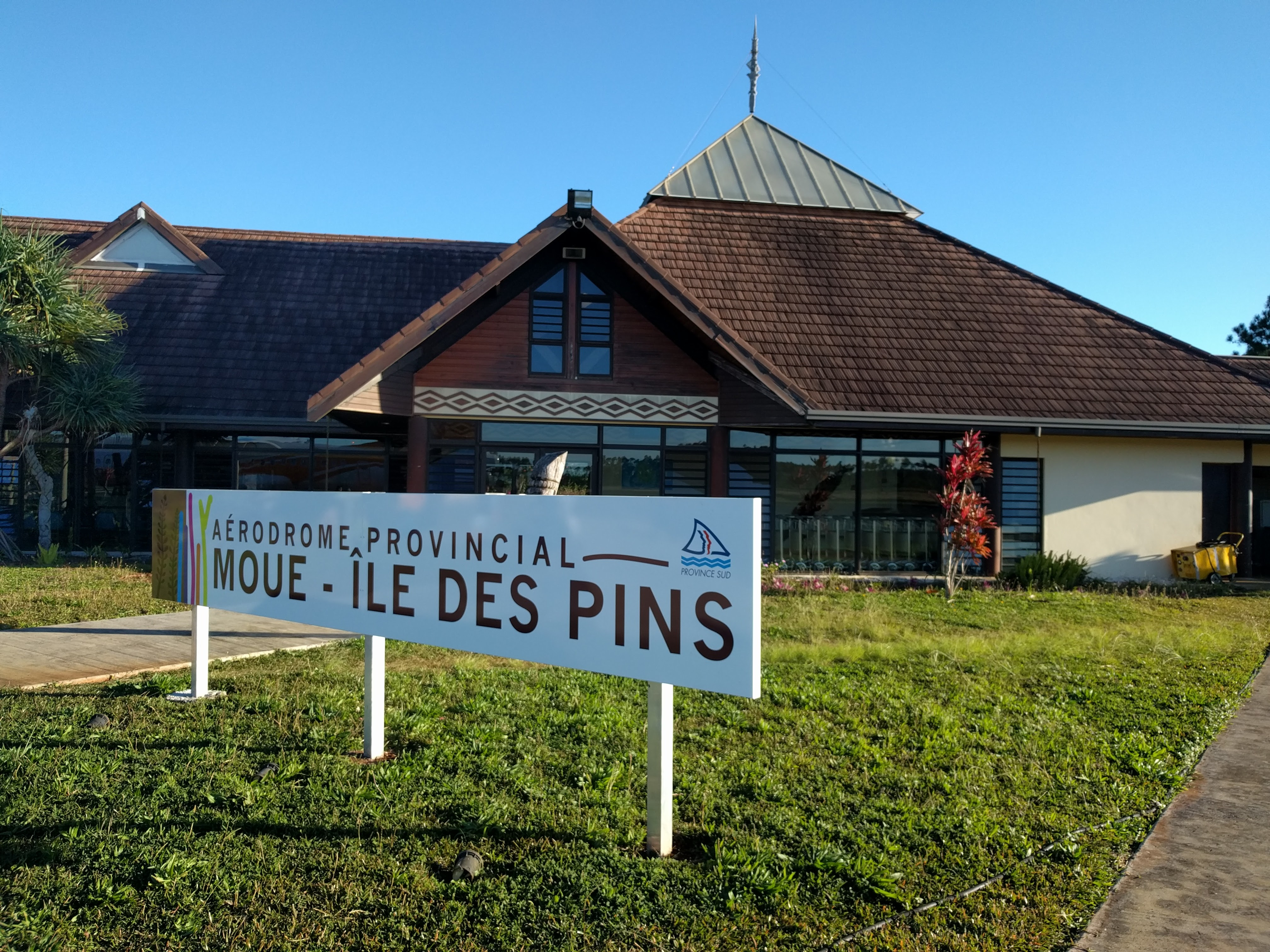
- IATA: ILP; ICAO: NWWE

Summary
- Airport type: Public
- Operator: New Caledonia Chamber of Commerce & Industry
- Serves: Île des Pins, New Caledonia
- Elevation AMSL: 317 ft (97 m)
- Coordinates: 22°35′20″S 167°27′21″E

Map
- Location of airport in New Caledonia

Runways
Direction	Length		Surface
Direction	m	ft	Surface
10/28	1,250	4,101	asphalt

Statistics (2018)
- Passengers: 107,065
- Passenger traffic change: ▲3.8%
- Sources: Aeroport.fr

Île des Pins Airport (French: Aérodrome provincial Moue - Île des Pins) is an airport on Île des Pins in New Caledonia (IATA: ILP, ICAO: NWWE).

== Airlines and destinations ==
Air Calédonie connects Île des Pins Airport to La Tontouta International Airport (Nouméa).
