= Ouvéa Airport =

Airport in New Caledonia

- IATA: UVE; ICAO: NWWV

Summary
- Airport type: Public
- Serves: Ouvéa, New Caledonia
- Elevation AMSL: 23 ft (7.0 m)
- Coordinates: 20°38′26″S 166°34′22″E

Map
- Location of the airport in New Caledonia

Runways
Direction	Length		Surface
Direction	ft	m	Surface
13/31	3,609	1,100	Paved
- Sources: Great Circle Mapper

Ouvéa Airport is an airport in Ouvéa, New Caledonia (IATA: UVE, ICAO: NWWV).

== Airlines and destinations ==
Airlines	Destinations
Air Calédonie	Lifou, Nouméa–Magenta, Nouméa–Tontouta
Air Oceania	Lifou, Nouméa–Magenta
