= Tiga Island =

Pacific island of New Caledonia

Coordinates: 21°6′25″S 167°48′53″E

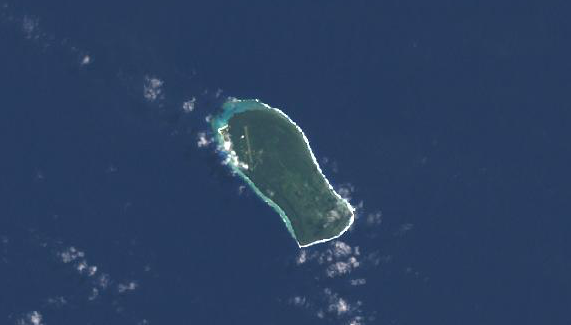
Satellite view of Tiga Island

Tiga Island (Dehu: Tixa), also called Tokanod, is a small island in the South Pacific Ocean. Tiga lies 35 km (22 mi) from Lifou Island, and 24.5 km (15.2 mi) from Maré Island in the Loyalty Islands. The Loyalty Islands are part of the greater archipelago of New Caledonia.

Tiga is part of the commune (municipality) of Lifou, in the Loyalty Islands Province (Province des îles Loyauté), one of three provinces of the Territory of New Caledonia and Dependencies, an overseas territory of France. The island is 6 km (3.7 mi) long and 2 km (1.2 mi) wide, totaling about 10 square kilometres (4 square miles). The highest point is 76 metres (249 feet) above sea level. The population of Tiga Island was 169 in 1996, for a density of about 17 person per km.

The island has occasional commercial air service to its airfield, Tiga Airport.

== In popular culture ==
- Tiga is featured in the children's novel On the Run (1964), by British author Nina Bawden.
- A manipulated version of the Nyinewaco dance, a Kanak choir and dance from the Tiga island, is featured in the song My Weakness in the 1999 Moby album Play.
- Tiga Island was given to a new superhero of the Ultra Series called Ultraman Tiga based on the of the same name
