= Koumac =

Commune of New Caledonia

- Commune
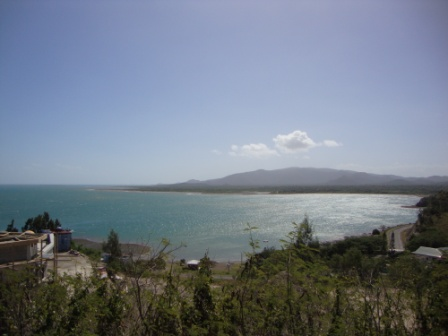
- View of the baie des Sables taken from Pandop with Tiebaghi massif in the background

- Coat of arms

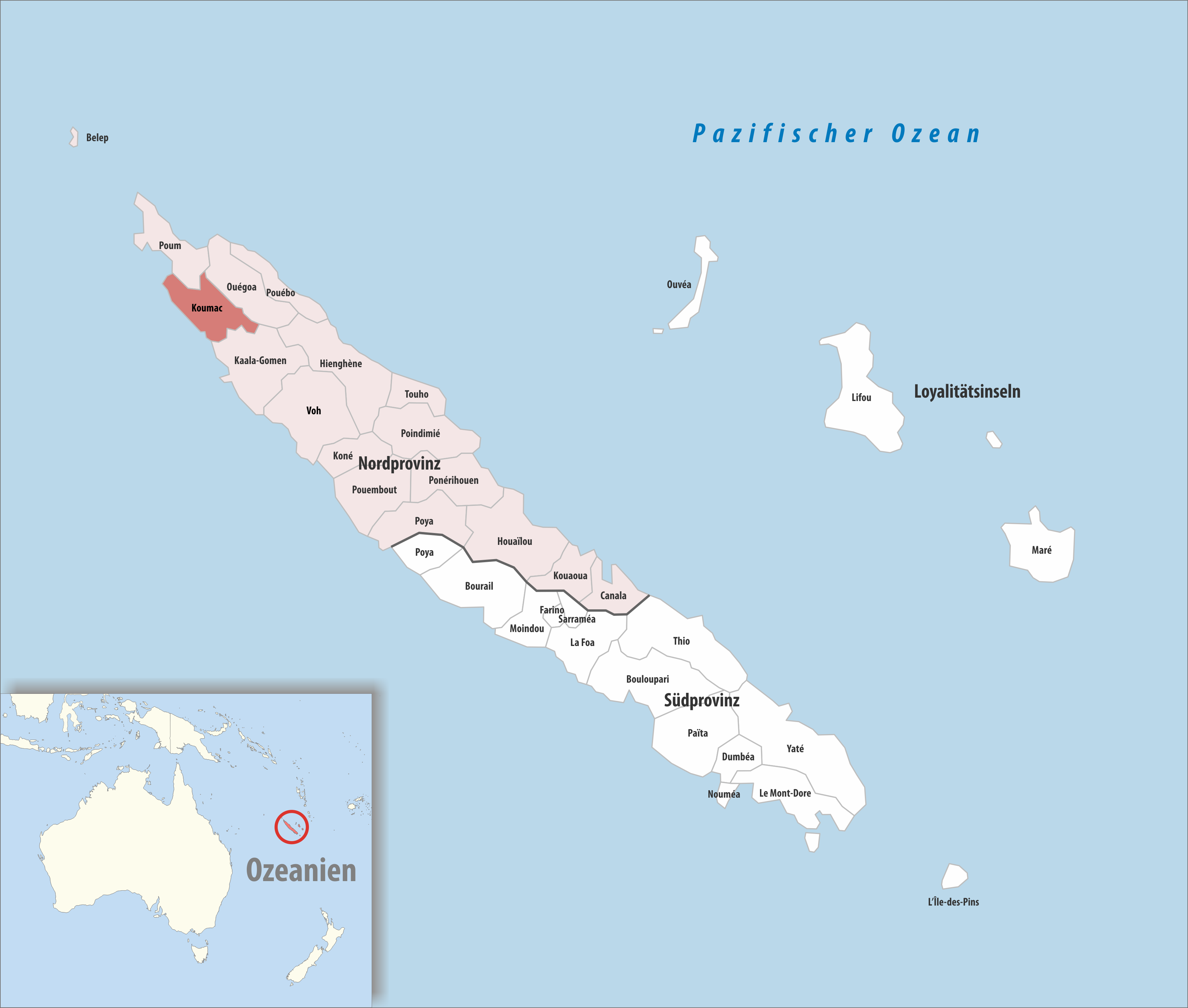
- Location of the commune (in red) within New Caledonia
- Location of Koumac
- Coordinates: 20°33′44″S 164°15′43″E
- Country: France
- Sui generis collectivity: New Caledonia
- Province: North Province

Government
  - Mayor (2020–2026): Wilfrid Weiss
- Area^{1}: 550.0 km^{2} (212.4 sq mi)
- Elevation: 10 m (33 ft)
- Highest elevation: 823 m (2,700 ft)
- Lowest elevation: 0 m (0 ft)
- Population (2019 census): 3,981
  - Density: 7.238/km^{2} (18.75/sq mi)

Ethnic distribution
  - 2019 census: Kanaks 38.33% Europeans 28.16% Wallisians and Futunans 0.98% Mixed 22.51% Other 10.02%
- Time zone: UTC+11:00
- INSEE/Postal code: 98812 /98850
- ^{1} New Caledonia Land Register (DITTT) data, which exclude lakes and ponds larger than 1 km² (0.386 sq mi or 247 acres) as well as the estuaries of rivers.

Koumac (French: [kumak]; Nêlêmwa-Nixumwak: Kumak) is a commune in the North Province of New Caledonia, an overseas territory of France in the Pacific Ocean.

== History ==
On 5 January 1977 about 46% of the territory of Koumac was detached and became the commune of Poum.

The town of Koumac serves as a regional centre for the far north region of Grande Terre island. It has good connections north and south by road, and several shops, industrial suppliers, and utilities. It is a centre for mining employment, formerly dominated by the mine at Tiébaghi which closed in 1990, and other current operations. Koumac Airport is located a couple kilometres north of the commune with regular flights to Nouméa.

== Climate ==
Koumac has a tropical savanna climate (Köppen Aw), although there is still some rain in the dry season which peaks between July and October.

Climate data for Koumac, 1981–2010 normals, extremes 1951–present
Month	Jan	Feb	Mar	Apr	May	Jun	Jul	Aug	Sep	Oct	Nov	Dec	Year
Record high °C (°F)	34.9 (94.8)	36.0 (96.8)	35.1 (95.2)	33.8 (92.8)	32.2 (90.0)	32.2 (90.0)	30.8 (87.4)	30.9 (87.6)	31.5 (88.7)	33.5 (92.3)	34.6 (94.3)	35.8 (96.4)	36.0 (96.8)
Mean daily maximum °C (°F)	30.2 (86.4)	30.3 (86.5)	29.5 (85.1)	28.5 (83.3)	26.9 (80.4)	25.4 (77.7)	24.4 (75.9)	24.5 (76.1)	25.8 (78.4)	27.2 (81.0)	28.4 (83.1)	29.5 (85.1)	27.6 (81.6)
Daily mean °C (°F)	26.6 (79.9)	26.8 (80.2)	26.2 (79.2)	24.9 (76.8)	23.1 (73.6)	21.7 (71.1)	20.4 (68.7)	20.5 (68.9)	21.5 (70.7)	22.9 (73.2)	24.4 (75.9)	25.7 (78.3)	23.7 (74.7)
Mean daily minimum °C (°F)	23.0 (73.4)	23.3 (73.9)	22.8 (73.0)	21.3 (70.3)	19.3 (66.7)	18.0 (64.4)	16.5 (61.7)	16.5 (61.7)	17.2 (63.0)	18.7 (65.7)	20.4 (68.7)	21.8 (71.2)	19.9 (67.8)
Record low °C (°F)	15.8 (60.4)	16.9 (62.4)	15.1 (59.2)	14.3 (57.7)	11.5 (52.7)	8.7 (47.7)	8.2 (46.8)	8.5 (47.3)	9.3 (48.7)	11.3 (52.3)	14.5 (58.1)	14.2 (57.6)	8.2 (46.8)
Average precipitation mm (inches)	157.7 (6.21)	145.2 (5.72)	161.9 (6.37)	80.7 (3.18)	79.6 (3.13)	77.2 (3.04)	45.3 (1.78)	39.7 (1.56)	27.8 (1.09)	23.3 (0.92)	48.6 (1.91)	97.8 (3.85)	984.8 (38.76)
Average precipitation days	9.6	11.0	9.7	6.3	5.1	5.2	4.2	3.6	2.4	2.7	4.4	6.1	70.3
Mean monthly sunshine hours	235.3	198.9	201.2	206.9	192.3	185.0	206.8	224.7	239.5	261.8	250.9	256.4	2,659.7
Source: Météo-France

== Famous people ==
Athlete Arnjolt Beer was born here.
