= Belep =

Commune of New Caledonia

- Commune
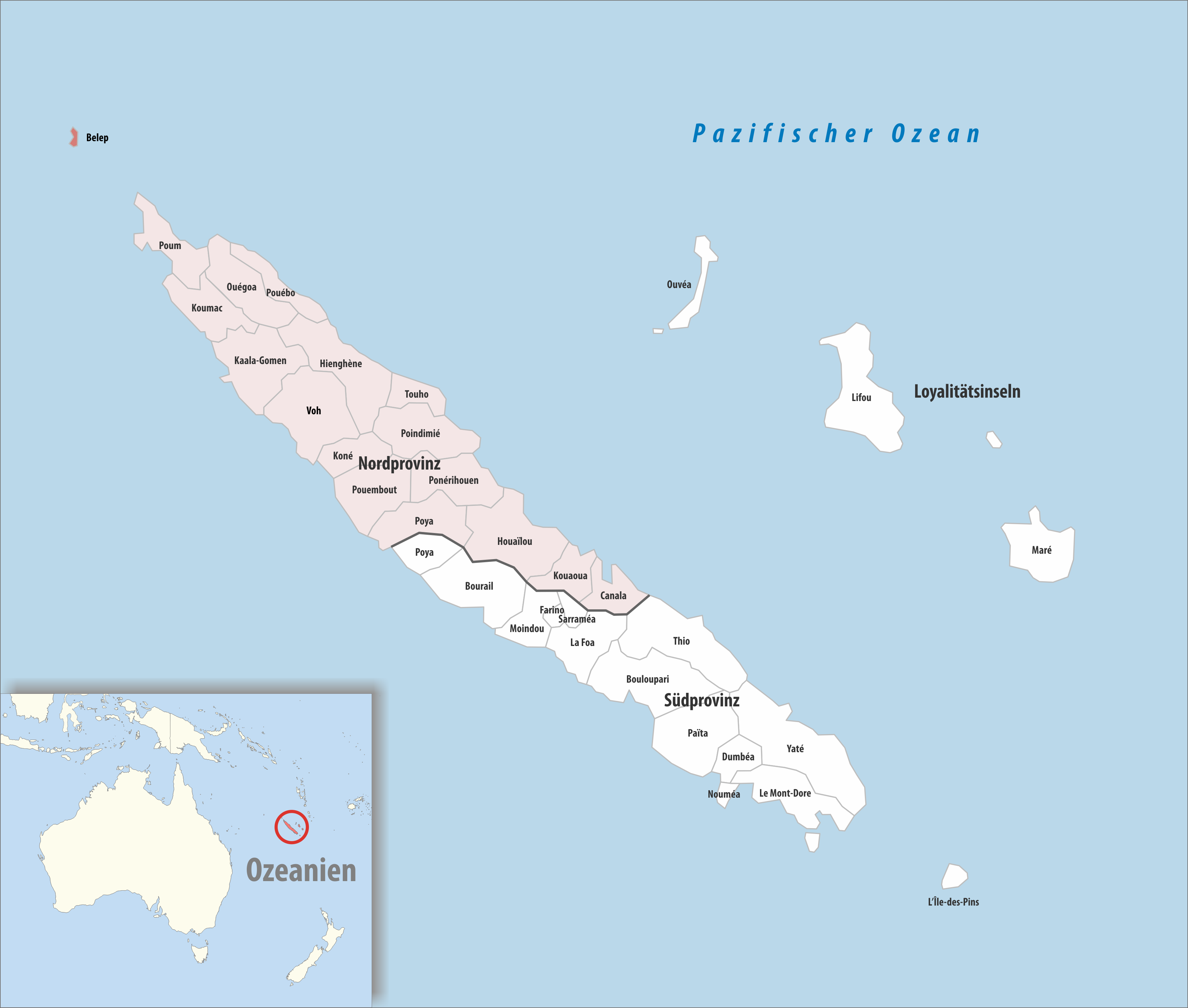
- Location of the commune (in red) within New Caledonia
- Location of Belep
- Location within France
- Coordinates: 19°45′00″S 163°40′00″E
- Country: France
- Sui generis collectivity: New Caledonia
- Province: North Province

Government
  - Mayor (2020–2026): Jean-Baptiste Moilou
- Area^{1}: 69.5 km^{2} (26.8 sq mi)
- Elevation: 20 m (66 ft)
- Highest elevation: 283 m (928 ft)
- Lowest elevation: 0 m (0 ft)
- Population (2019 census): 867
  - Density: 12.5/km^{2} (32.3/sq mi)

Ethnic distribution
  - 2019 census: Kanaks 98.5% Europeans 0.12% Mixed 1.04% Other 0.23%
- Time zone: UTC+11:00
- INSEE/Postal code: 98801 /98811
- ^{1} New Caledonia Land Register (DITTT) data, which exclude lakes and ponds larger than 1 km² (0.386 sq mi or 247 acres) as well as the estuaries of rivers.

Belep (French: [belɛp]; sometimes unofficially spelled Bélep; Nyâlayu: Dau Ar) is a commune in the North Province of New Caledonia, an overseas French territory of France, located in the Pacific Ocean. It has almost 900 people living on 70 km^{2}.

The commune's territory is made up of the Belep Islands (also known as the Belep Archipelago), which lie to the north of New Caledonia's main island (Grande Terre). The two principal islands in the Belep Archipelago are Art Island (a.k.a. Aar) and Pott Island ^{fr} (a.k.a. Phwoc). The rest of the archipelago consists of the Northern and Southern Daos Islands, and several very small islets.

The administrative centre of the commune is the settlement of Waala, on Art Island, the largest of the Belep Islands. The local language is Nyêlâyu.

== History ==
The Belep Islands were named after a Kanak chief who settled there in ancient times. Gradually, discrete clans of Kanak emerged in different locations on the occupied islands. Traditional life was disrupted by the French colonial presence from the 1800s. A Catholic mission was founded in Belep in 1856 by Pierre Lambert (1822–1903) but only lasted until 1863. The Marists later returned, and another priest Marie-Joseph Dubois (1913–1998), who lived there 1940–1941, also wrote a history of Bélep in 1985.

In 1879, following a widespread Kanak rebellion led by Ataï, largely on the main island Grande Terre, some of the insurgents were temporarily moved from Grande Terre to the islands as punishment. The islands were the site of a leper colony between 1892 and 1898 during which time the native islanders were exiled to Balade on the mainland, and suffered greatly. On their return, they were not allowed to reoccupy one of their islands, Isle Pott, taken by a colonial copra farmer, Monsieur Mary, permitted by government authority. It took the clans until the 1950s to get back the island and later it was officially re-incorporated into their customary control.

The standard of living in Belep has risen since the 1950s, in common with other outlying parts of New Caledonia. However, traditions and language are strongly maintained, only half the population can speak French, and few residents have any school certificates having only attended until the age of 12. Around 1955, an airstrip was built in Waala and there are flights, but it is the least frequented AirCal route. Passenger boats to Koumac and Poum are irregular. A modern medical clinic, serviced by a French doctor and nurses, was also built. Waala has the only primary school, shops, church, and post office. In 1961, Belep became a commune; its first mayor was elected in 1969. In the 1980s, when the movement for Kanak independence became violent (Les Evènements), some Belema migrated to the Mainland to escape political divisions.

Belep struggles to obtain resources from the territorial government and there is still no schooling beyond primary level (children then have to attend boarding school on Grande Terre, in Poum for example). Settlement, disrupted by events in the 19th century, has concentrated clans in Waala. Alcoholism is a serious problem and there have been violent episodes, including the killing of a clinic staff member in 2003.

In August 2016, a large bushfire ravaged Isle Art (Art Island).

== Economy ==
The economy is reliant on fishing, the main commercial activity. Around 40% of all registered business are in the fisheries sector. The reef fish Scomberomorus commerson, a mackerel, is caught and over 20 tonnes a year are sold. Scallops (Amusium japonicum balloti) are sold to SAS West Pacific Scallops, an Australian company, destined for Australia and Asia. The scallop trade is supported by the Northern Province and 20% by the clans. It has provided some training and prevented youth from migrating to Grande Terre.

There are small cobalt reserves, exploited unsuccessfully in the 19th century.

Belep has no tourist facilities and no accommodation for visitors.
