= Touho =

Commune of New Caledonia

- Commune
- Coat of arms

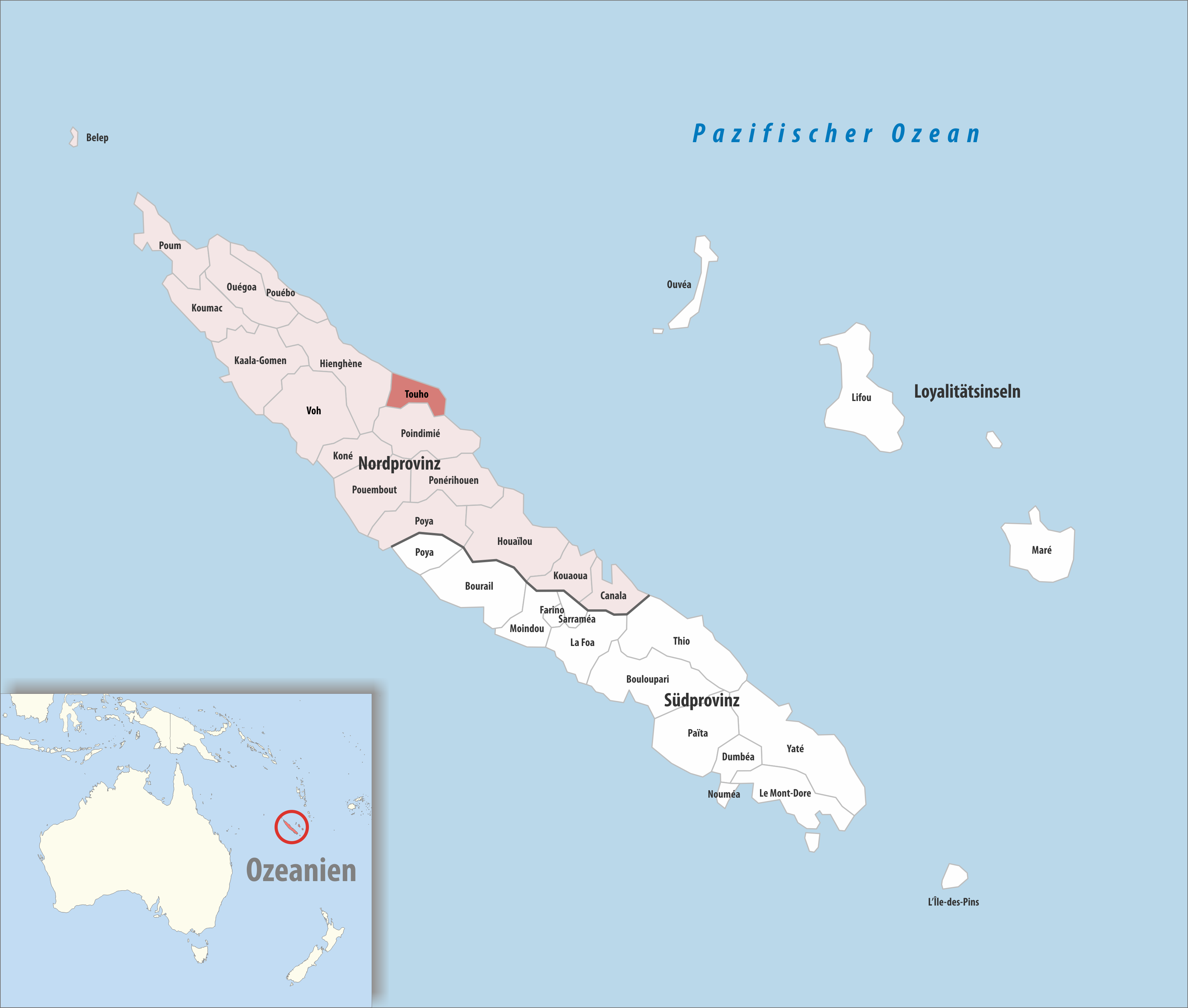
- Location of the commune (in red) within New Caledonia
- Location of Touho
- Coordinates: 20°47′S 165°14′E
- Country: France
- Sui generis collectivity: New Caledonia
- Province: North Province

Government
  - Mayor (2020–2026): Alphonse Poinine
- Area^{1}: 283.0 km^{2} (109.3 sq mi)
- Elevation: 10 m (33 ft)
- Highest elevation: 1,069 m (3,507 ft)
- Lowest elevation: 0 m (0 ft)
- Population (2019 census): 2,380
  - Density: 8.41/km^{2} (21.8/sq mi)

Ethnic distribution
  - 2019 census: Kanaks 81.01% Europeans 6.47% Wallisians and Futunans 0.17% Mixed 9.37% Other 2.98%
- Time zone: UTC+11:00
- INSEE/Postal code: 98830 /98831
- ^{1} New Caledonia Land Register (DITTT) data, which exclude lakes and ponds larger than 1 km² (0.386 sq mi or 247 acres) as well as the estuaries of rivers.

Touho (French: [tu.o], Cemuhî: Tuo Cèmuhî) is a commune in the North Province of New Caledonia, an overseas territory of France in the Pacific Ocean. Touho lies on the east coast of the main island (Grande Terre) and is served by a road and an airfield.

The vocational school, Lycée Professionnel Augustin Ty, was officially opened in 1994. It is located directly opposite the airport.

== Geography ==
=== Climate ===
Touho has a tropical rainforest climate (Köppen climate classification Af). The average annual temperature in Touho is 24.3 °C (75.7 °F). The average annual rainfall is 2,368.1 mm (93.23 in) with March as the wettest month. The temperatures are highest on average in February, at around 27.0 °C (80.6 °F), and lowest in August, at around 21.5 °C (70.7 °F). The highest temperature ever recorded in Touho was 34.1 °C (93.4 °F) on 27 February 2025; the coldest temperature ever recorded was 10.2 °C (50.4 °F) on 23 September 1994.

Climate data for Touho (Touho Airport, 1991−2020 normals, extremes 1993−present)
Month	Jan	Feb	Mar	Apr	May	Jun	Jul	Aug	Sep	Oct	Nov	Dec	Year
Record high °C (°F)	33.1 (91.6)	34.1 (93.4)	33.4 (92.1)	32.1 (89.8)	30.6 (87.1)	29.7 (85.5)	29.4 (84.9)	28.9 (84.0)	30.5 (86.9)	30.3 (86.5)	31.9 (89.4)	33.0 (91.4)	34.1 (93.4)
Mean daily maximum °C (°F)	29.2 (84.6)	29.6 (85.3)	29.2 (84.6)	28.0 (82.4)	26.5 (79.7)	25.1 (77.2)	24.4 (75.9)	24.3 (75.7)	25.2 (77.4)	26.3 (79.3)	27.3 (81.1)	28.4 (83.1)	27.0 (80.6)
Daily mean °C (°F)	26.6 (79.9)	27.0 (80.6)	26.7 (80.1)	25.5 (77.9)	23.9 (75.0)	22.6 (72.7)	21.6 (70.9)	21.5 (70.7)	22.4 (72.3)	23.6 (74.5)	24.7 (76.5)	25.8 (78.4)	24.3 (75.7)
Mean daily minimum °C (°F)	24.1 (75.4)	24.4 (75.9)	24.1 (75.4)	23.0 (73.4)	21.4 (70.5)	20.0 (68.0)	18.7 (65.7)	18.6 (65.5)	19.6 (67.3)	20.9 (69.6)	22.0 (71.6)	23.3 (73.9)	21.7 (71.1)
Record low °C (°F)	17.5 (63.5)	18.9 (66.0)	19.0 (66.2)	16.6 (61.9)	14.3 (57.7)	10.3 (50.5)	11.4 (52.5)	12.0 (53.6)	10.2 (50.4)	14.4 (57.9)	16.0 (60.8)	13.3 (55.9)	10.2 (50.4)
Average precipitation mm (inches)	298.4 (11.75)	333.7 (13.14)	377.0 (14.84)	256.1 (10.08)	187.5 (7.38)	138.5 (5.45)	102.8 (4.05)	110.5 (4.35)	96.8 (3.81)	106.3 (4.19)	143.2 (5.64)	217.3 (8.56)	2,368.1 (93.23)
Average precipitation days (≥ 1.0 mm)	16.2	17.7	19.3	16.2	13.9	10.5	8.6	8.9	7.9	10.1	11.3	15.9	156.4
Source: Météo-France
