= Tiga Airport =

Airport in New Caledonia

- IATA: TGJ; ICAO: NWWA

Summary
- Airport type: Public
- Operator: Government
- Serves: Tiga Island, New Caledonia
- Elevation AMSL: 115 ft (35 m)
- Coordinates: 21°05′45″S 167°48′14″E

Map
- Location of the airport in New Caledonia

Runways
Direction	Length		Surface
Direction	ft	m	Surface
18/36	3,222	982	Asphalt
- Sources: AIP France, DAFIF

Tiga Airport (IATA: TGJ, ICAO: NWWA) is an airport on Tiga Island in New Caledonia.

== Airlines and destinations ==
Air Oceania connects Tiga Airport to Ouanaham Airport (Lifou) and Nouméa Magenta Airport.
