= Nouméa Magenta Airport =

Airport in Nouméa, New Caledonia, France

Nouméa Magenta Airport Aéroport de Nouméa-Magenta
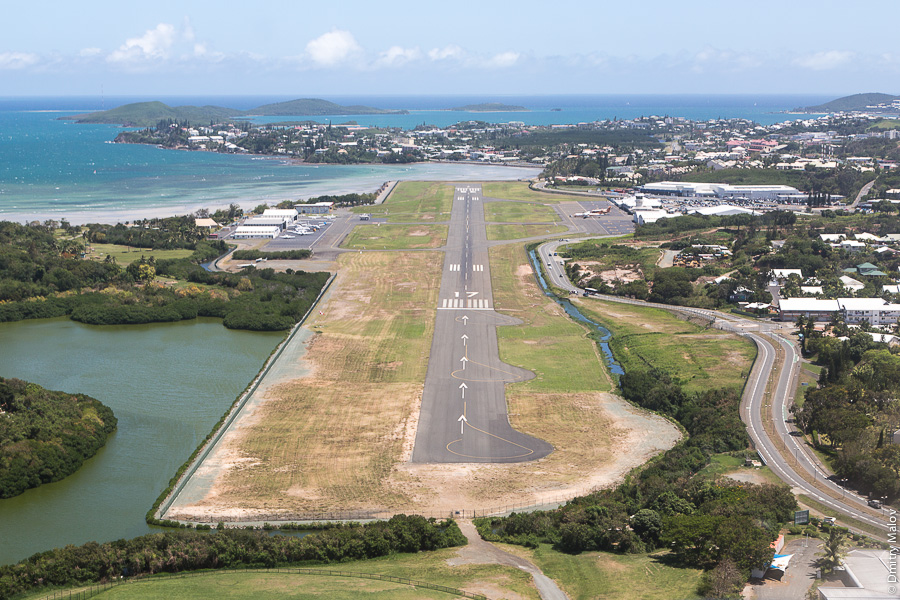
- IATA: GEA; ICAO: NWWM

Summary
- Airport type: Public
- Operator: DSEAC Nouvelle-Calédonie
- Location: Nouméa
- Elevation AMSL: 9 ft (2.7 m)
- Coordinates: 22°15′30″S 166°28′22″E

Maps
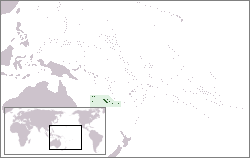
- Nouméa in New Caledonia

- Location of the airport in New Caledonia GEA/NWWM (Oceania)

Runways
Direction	Length		Surface
Direction	m	ft	Surface
17/35	1,250	4,101	Paved

Statistics (2018)
- Passengers: 454,540
- Passenger traffic change: ▲6.0%
- Source: Aeroport.fr AIP

Nouméa Magenta Airport (French: Aéroport de Nouméa-Magenta; IATA: GEA, ICAO: NWWM) is a domestic airport on the main island of New Caledonia, an overseas collectivity of France in the southwest Pacific Ocean. The airport is 3 km (2 mi) east-northeast of the city centre of Nouméa, the capital, approximately 38 km (24 mi) southeast of La Tontouta International Airport. In 2017, 428,679 passengers used the airport.

Air Calédonie has its head office on the airport property.

The government of New Caledonia closed the airport in March 2026, with all flights shifted to La Tontouta Airport. On 17 May 2026, in response to a blockade preventing flights from La Tontouta to the Loyalty Islands, Air Oceania restarted its services from Magenta.

== History ==
Terminal building at Nouméa Magenta Airport

- 1931: First biplane flight on the beach in Magenta, located on the east coast of Nouméa.
- 1934: Creation of L'Aéro-club Calédonien.
- 1942: Arrival of the Poppy Force, a US Army division commanded by General Alexander Patch, making New Caledonia one of the main Pacific airbases for the US Army. A military airfield is built along the beach in Magenta by Seabees of Naval Construction Battalion 11 on the site of a former racetrack.
- 1956: Opening of the airfield to civilian air traffic, two years after the creation of Transpac, the first domestic New Caledonian airline and forerunner of Air Calédonie, which has regular flights between Nouméa, the Isle of Pines and the Loyalty Islands.
- 1970s: Construction of the first terminal, with a capacity of 100,000 people.
- 2001: Completion and opening of the new terminal, increasing capacity to over 300,000 people.

== Airlines and destinations ==
Airlines	Destinations
Air Oceania	Lifou, Maré, Ouvéa, Tiga

== See also ==
- Nouméa-La Tontouta Airport
- List of airports in New Caledonia
