= Lifou Island =

Pacific island of New Caledonia

Lifou
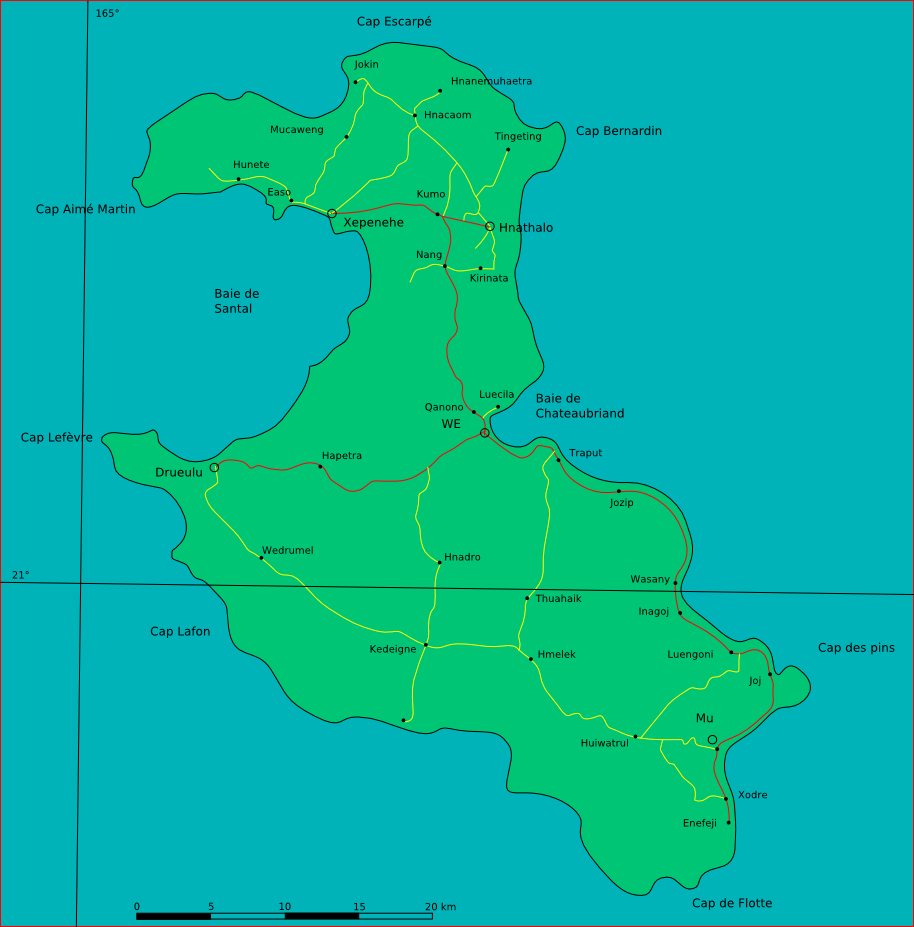
- Map of Lifou, the central island in the Loyalty Islands, New Caledonia.

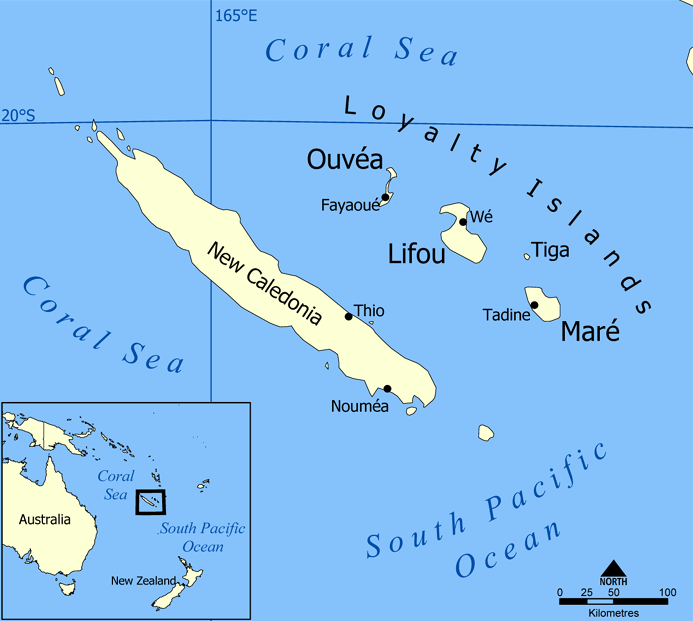

Geography
- Location: Pacific Ocean
- Coordinates: 20.9°S 167.2°E
- Archipelago: Loyalty Islands
- Area: 1,207 km^{2} (466 sq mi)
- Length: 81 km (50.3 mi)
- Width: 16–24 km (9.9–14.9 mi)

Administration
- France
- Sui generis collectivity: New Caledonia
- Commune: Lifou

Demographics
- Population: 10,151 (2004)
- Pop. density: 8.48/km^{2} (21.96/sq mi)
- Ethnic groups: Kanaks 96.9%, Europeans 2.6%, Polynesians 0.1%, Other 0.4%

Lifou Island, historically spelt Lifu or Lefu in English, and known as Drehu in the local language, is the largest, most populous and most important island of the Loyalty Islands, in the archipelago of New Caledonia, an overseas territory of France in the Pacific Ocean. With a total area of 1,207 km^{2} (466 sq mi), Lifou is located east of Australia at 20.9°S 167.2°E.

== Background ==
The first European to sight the island was Frenchman Dumont d'Urville in 1857. It was soon after visited by whalers and traders, and became a destination for Protestant and Catholic missionaries to proselytize the indigenous population. In 1864 the islands were annexed by France who in turn established it as an Aboriginal Reserve as it was not believed suitable for extensive colonialization.

== Administration ==
The island is part of the commune (municipality) of Lifou, in the Loyalty Islands Province of New Caledonia. The administrative center of the commune is located at Wé, on the east side of Lifou Island at Chateaubriand Bay. The local currency is the CFP Franc (French Pacific Franc).

== Geography ==
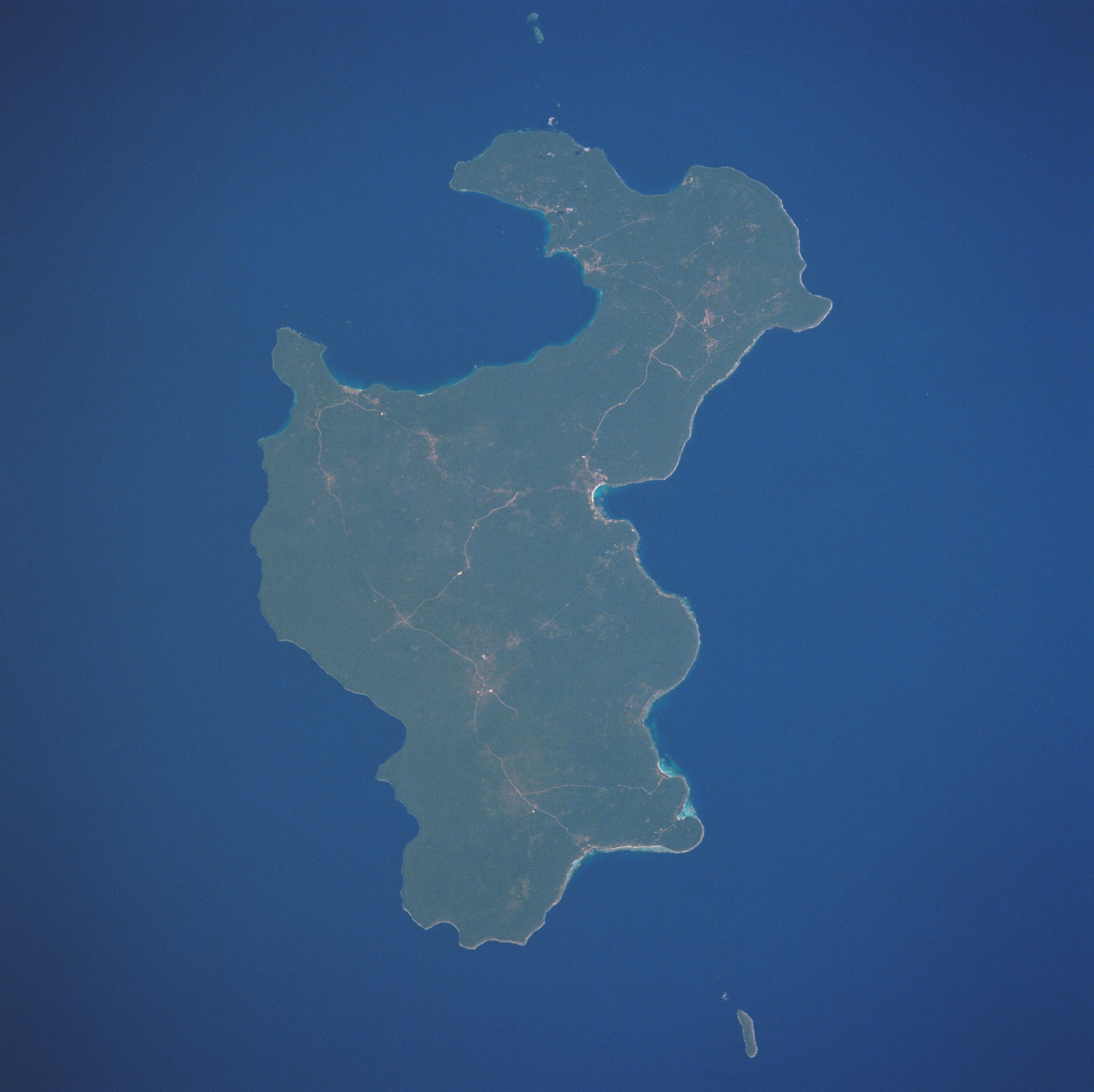
Lifou from space, November 1990

Irregular in shape, Lifou Island is 81 km (50 mi) long and 16 to 24 km (9.9 to 14.9 mi) wide. The island has no rivers, but has abundant vegetation, dense interior jungles, fertile soils, terraced cliffs and coral reefs.

Lifou Island is a former coral atoll that was part of a submerged volcano. Nearly 2 million years ago, the island was uplifted to its present shape and elevation, today it sits at a mere 60m above sea level at its highest point. Since there are no rivers on Lifou, the water comes from rain that seeps through the calcareous soil and forms freshwater ponds.

=== Important Bird Area ===
The forested Wetr district, comprising the northern part of Lifou, has been recognised as an Important Bird Area (IBA) by BirdLife International because it supports populations of red-bellied fruit doves, grey-eared honeyeaters, New Caledonian friarbirds, New Caledonian myzomelas, fan-tailed gerygones, South Melanesian cuckooshrikes, long-tailed trillers, streaked fantails, Melanesian flycatchers, large and small Lifou white-eyes, and striated starlings.

== Food ==
With its rich Pacific waters, marine life such as fish, crab, lobster and turtle are in abundance, along with domesticated animals such as goat, pig and chicken. Crops include coconut, banana, taro, sweet potato, yam and vanilla. At the same time, the French introduction of coffee stayed on.

== Economy ==
Tourism is a major industry on the island. Carnival Australia and Royal Caribbean visit Lifou bringing thousands of visitors each month.

Chief exports include copra, rubber, vanilla and sugarcane.

== Culture ==
The term Kanak is used for natives of the islands and their native language of the island is Drehu, with people descending from Melanesians and Polynesians. With a total of 19 different tribes inhabiting the three Loyalty Islands, six of which are on Lifou.

The current traditional high chief of the island is Evanès Boula, who in total is chief of 13 of these 19 Loyalty Islands tribes, succeeding Henri Boula on 13 June 1999. To the natives of the island, his word is law, and his power is absolute.

== Gallery ==
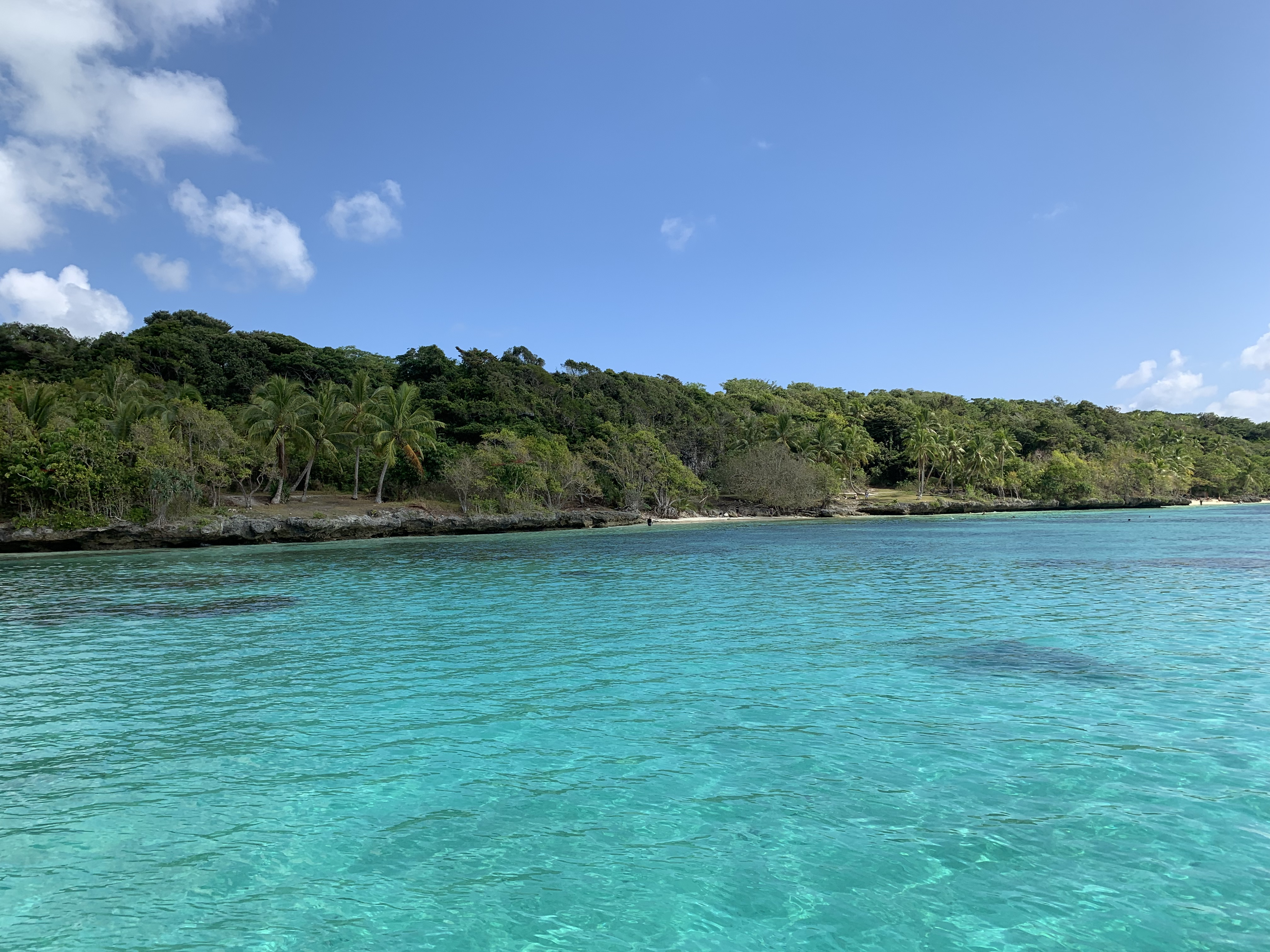

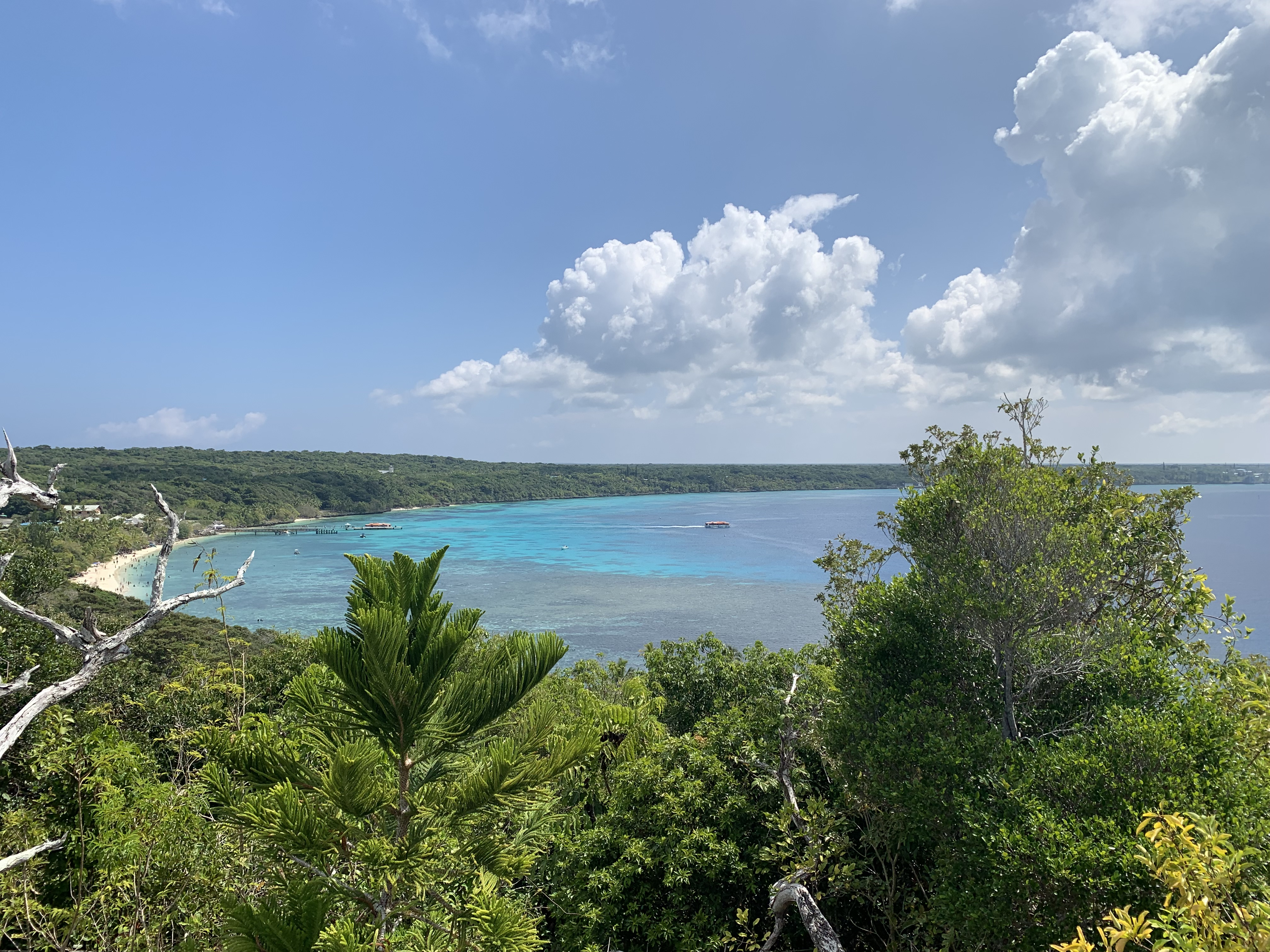

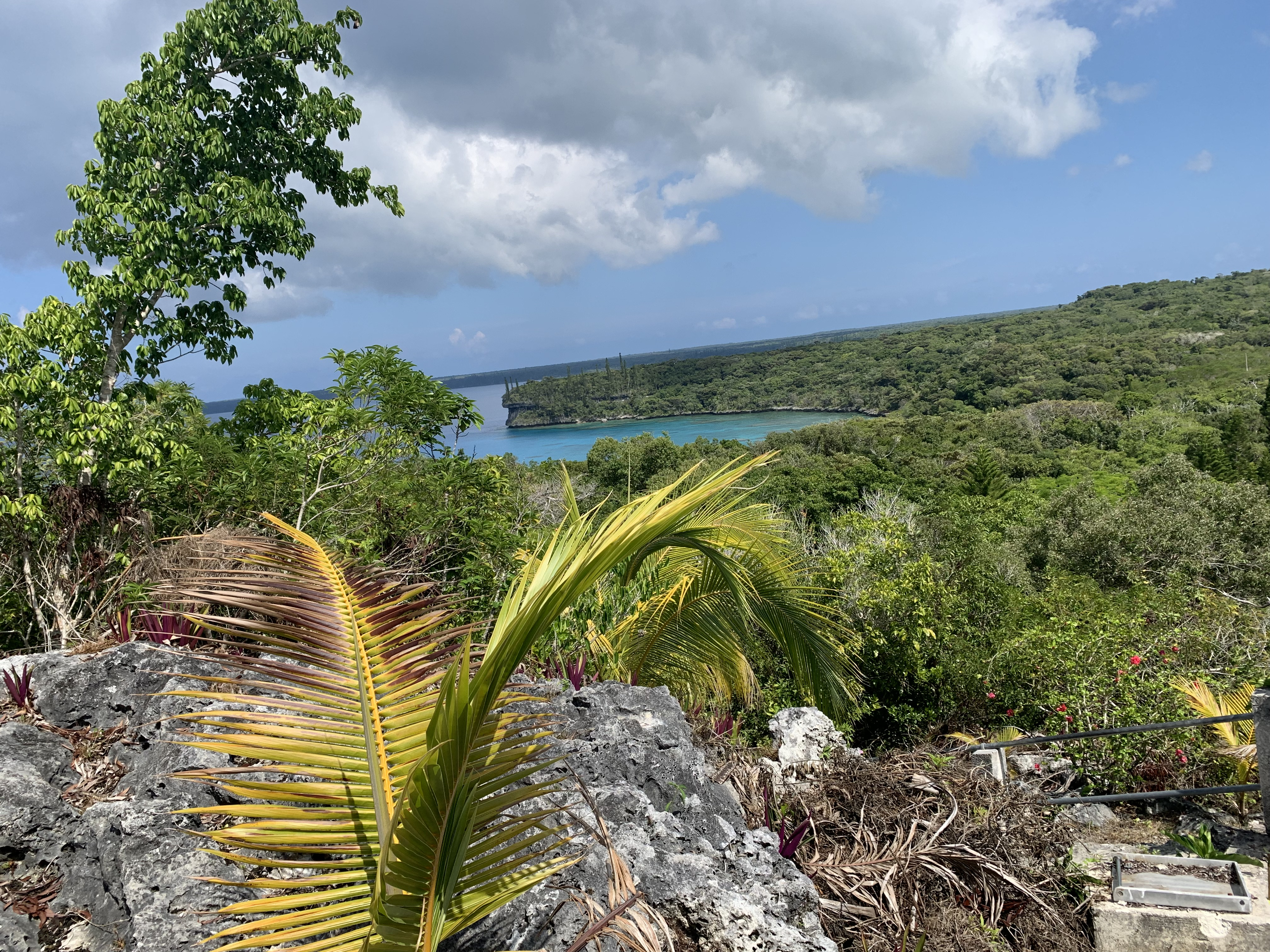

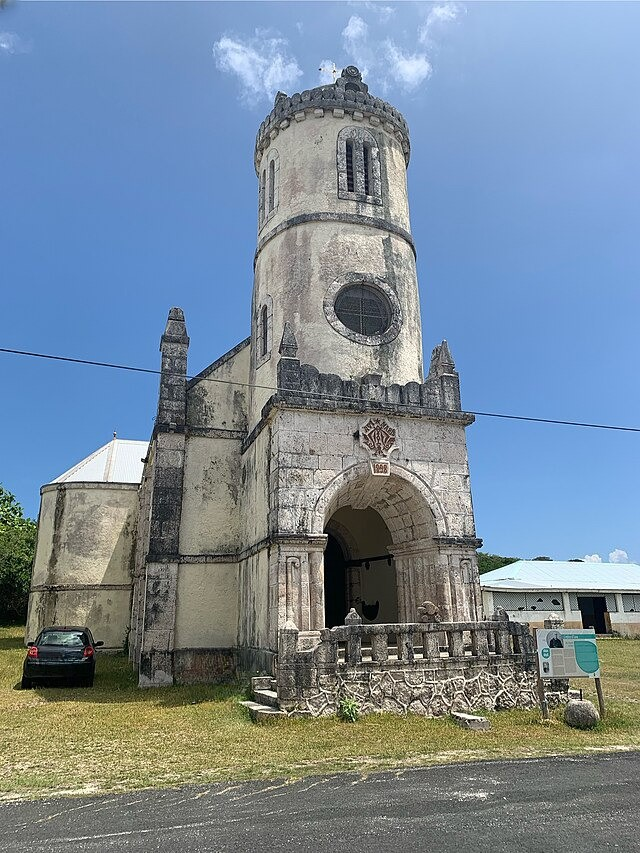

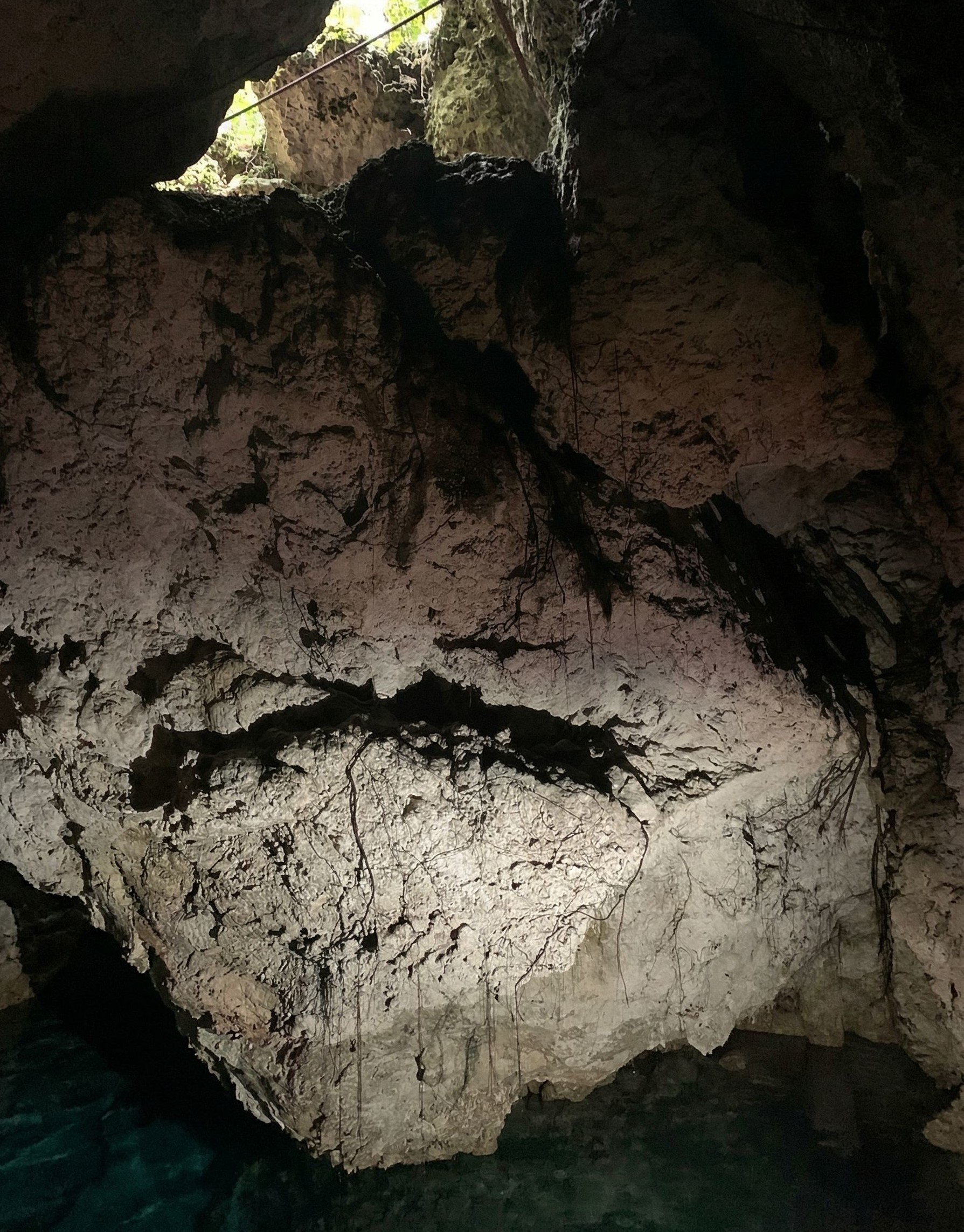

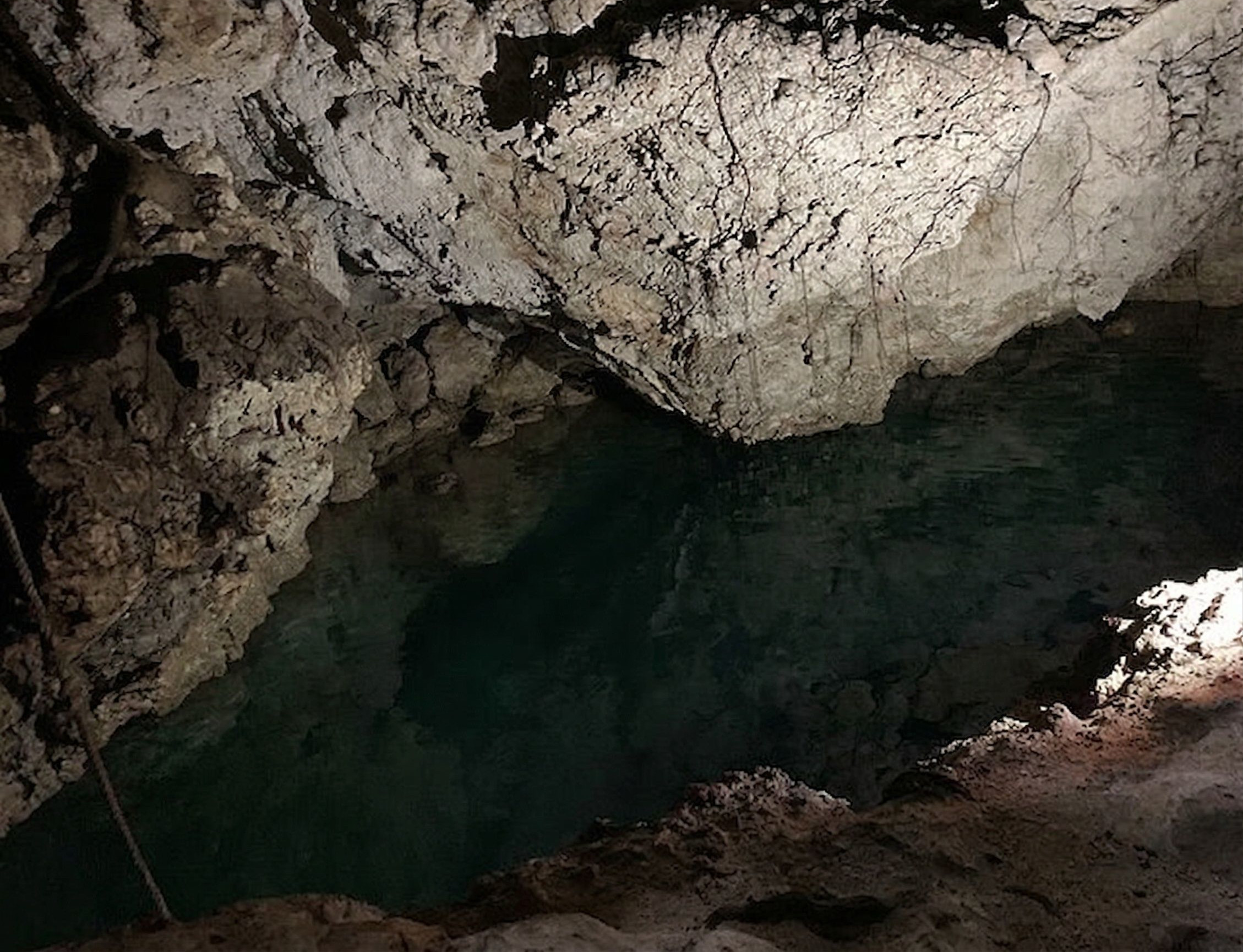
