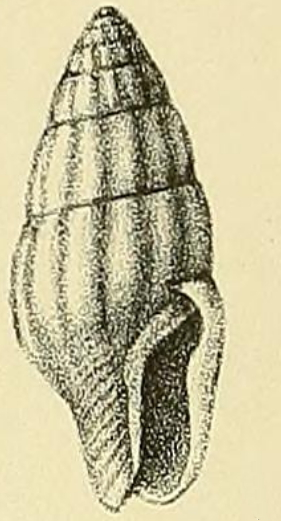
- Shell of Zafra phaula (holotype)

Scientific classification
- Kingdom: Animalia
- Phylum: Mollusca
- Class: Gastropoda
- Subclass: Caenogastropoda
- Order: Neogastropoda
- Superfamily: Buccinoidea
- Family: Columbellidae
- Genus: Zafra
- Species: Z. phaula

Binomial name
- Zafra phaula (Melvill & Standen, 1901)

Synonyms
- Columbella (Seminella) phaula Melvill & Standen, 1901 superseded combination

= Zafra phaula =

Species of gastropod

Zafra phaula is a species of sea snail in the family Columbellidae, the dove snails.

== Description ==
The length of the shell attains 2 mm, its diameter 1 mm.

This minute, ovate-obese shell is semipellucid. The shell contains five whorls of which two in the protoconch. It is doubtless nearly allied to Zafra melitoma and others of this group. It is much the smallest of the Karachi species, and the ribs are thicker in proportion to the size of the shell. There is no trace of spiral liration, nor has the outer lip any denticles on the inner surface. The aperture is narrow. The columella is simple. The form is also more attenuate and exiguous.

== Distribution ==
This marine species occurs off Karachi at the Pakistan coast.
