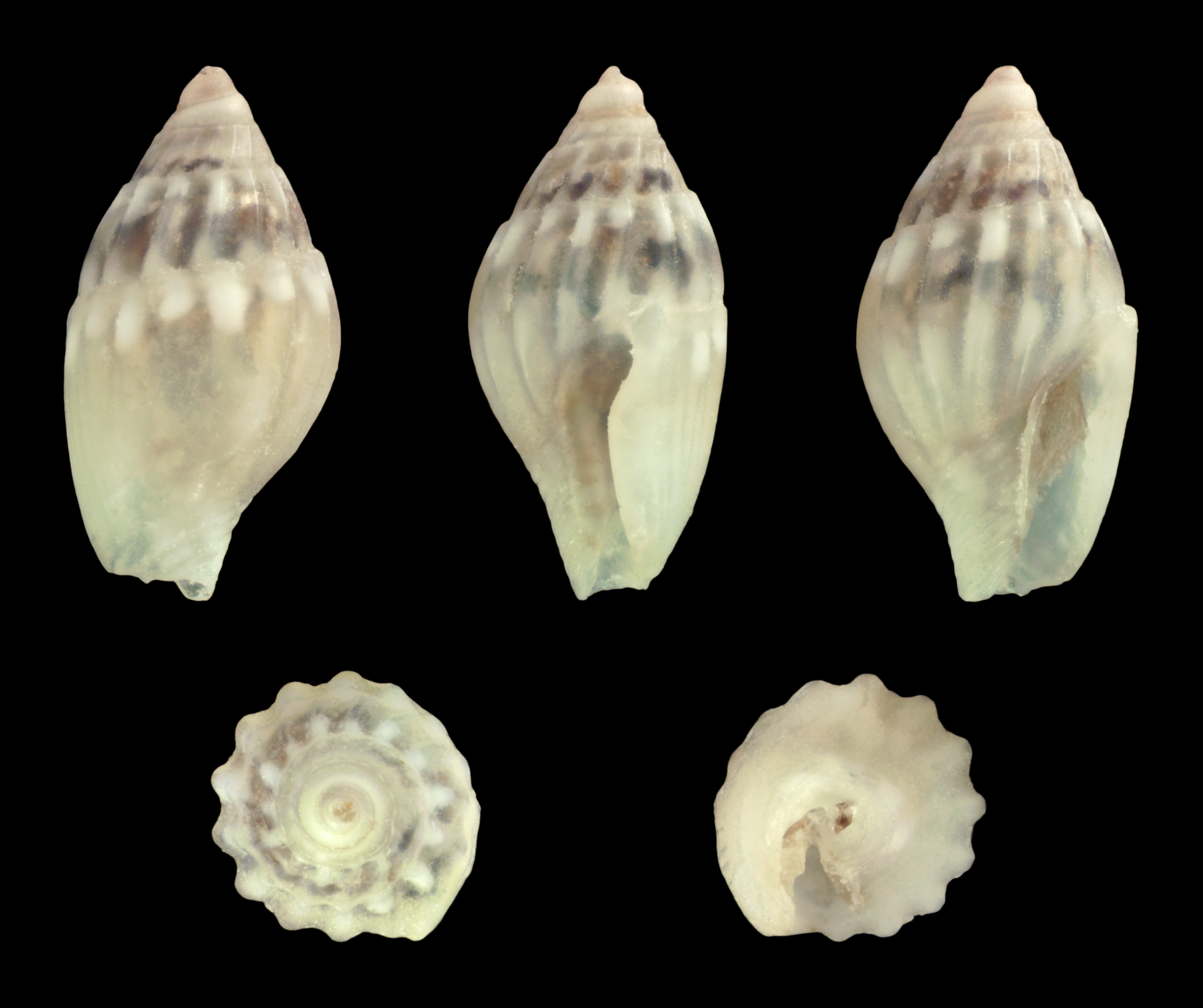
- Shell of Zafra obesula

Scientific classification
- Kingdom: Animalia
- Phylum: Mollusca
- Class: Gastropoda
- Subclass: Caenogastropoda
- Order: Neogastropoda
- Superfamily: Buccinoidea
- Family: Columbellidae
- Genus: Zafra
- Species: Z. obesula

Binomial name
- Zafra obesula (Hervier, 1900)

Synonyms
- Columbella obesula Hervier, 1900 superseded combination

= Zafra obesula =

Species of gastropod

Zafra obesula is a species of sea snail in the family Columbellidae, the dove snails.

== Taxonomy ==
Treated as a synonym of Zafra troglodytes (Souverbie, 1866) by Sleurs (1987)

== Description ==
The length of the shell attains 6 mm, its diameter 2.5 mm.

(original description in Latin) The shell is small, stoutly ovate, subglobose, shortly pointed at both ends, somewhat solid, brilliantly smooth, amber-colored, and bordered by two white bands. It consists of seven to eight whorls; the three embryonic whorls are rounded, smooth, shiny, and rapidly increasing in size. The subsequent whorls are convex, sloping, separated by a wavy suture, and longitudinally folded, featuring thick, obtuse, and undulating ribs that are joined at the base. The body whorl exceeds half of the total length of the shell; it is strongly inflated, nearly round, shortly depressed at the base where it is densely ridged, and terminates in a short, slightly recurved canal. The aperture is very narrow and winding. The columella is concave at the upper part, relatively straight and pleated in the middle, and oblique below. The outer lip is simple, somewhat thick at the top, oblique, flattened and scarcely convex; it is sharp at the margin, distinctly sinuated below the suture, and thickened within the throat, where it is armed with moderately strong folds.

== Distribution ==
This marine species occurs off Lifou Island, Loyalty Islands and the Philippines; also off Papua New Guinea and North Queensland, Australia.
