= Zafra exilis =

Scientific classification
- Kingdom: Animalia
- Phylum: Mollusca
- Class: Gastropoda
- Subclass: Caenogastropoda
- Order: Neogastropoda
- Family: Columbellidae
- Genus: Zafra
- Species: Z. exilis

Binomial name
- Zafra exilis (Philippi, 1849)

Synonyms
- Columbella exilis Philippi, 1849 (basionym)

Species of gastropod

Zafra exilis is a small species of sea snail in the family Columbellidae, the dove snails.

== Description ==
The length of the shell attains 5 mm.

== Distribution ==
This species occurs and is endemic in the Red Sea and off Oman, Aden and Djibouti and as an introduced species off the Canary Islands.
