= Zafra ulinganensis =

Scientific classification
- Kingdom: Animalia
- Phylum: Mollusca
- Class: Gastropoda
- Subclass: Caenogastropoda
- Order: Neogastropoda
- Superfamily: Buccinoidea
- Family: Columbellidae
- Genus: Zafra
- Species: Z. ulinganensis

Binomial name
- Zafra ulinganensis Sleurs, 1987

Species of gastropod

Zafra ulinganensis is a species of sea snail in the family Columbellidae, the dove snails.

== Description ==
The length of the shell attains 5 mm.

== Distribution ==
This marine species occurs off Papua New Guinea.
