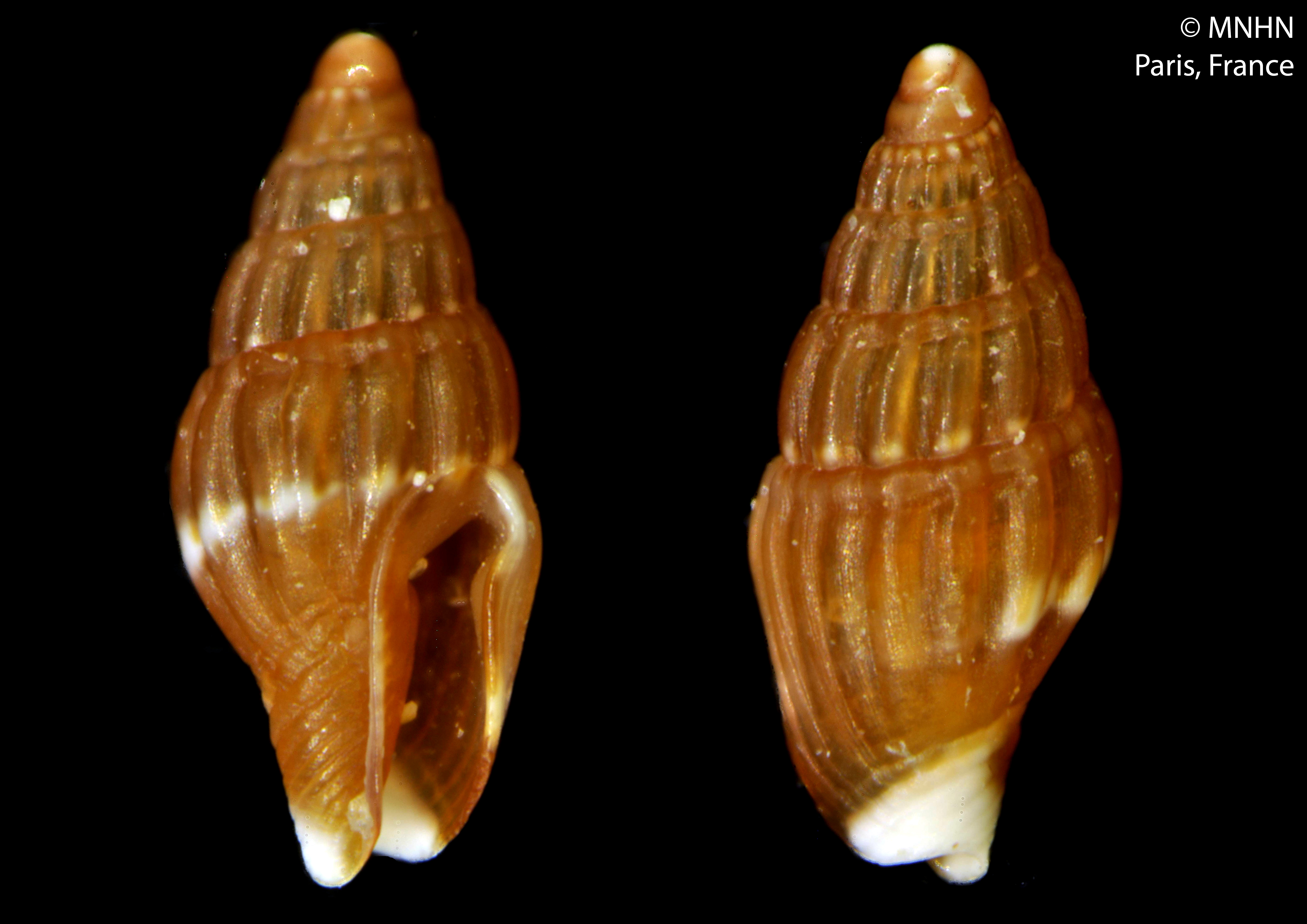
- Shell of Zafra australensis (specimen at MNHN, Paris)

Scientific classification
- Kingdom: Animalia
- Phylum: Mollusca
- Class: Gastropoda
- Subclass: Caenogastropoda
- Order: Neogastropoda
- Superfamily: Buccinoidea
- Family: Columbellidae
- Genus: Zafra
- Species: Z. australensis

Binomial name
- Zafra australensis K. Monsecour & D. Monsecour, 2015

= Zafra australensis =

Species of gastropod

Zafra australensis is a species of sea snail in the family Columbellidae, the dove snails.

== Description ==
The length of the shell attains 3.2 mm.

== Distribution ==
This marine species was found off the Austral Islands.
