= Zafra alternata =

Scientific classification
- Kingdom: Animalia
- Phylum: Mollusca
- Class: Gastropoda
- Subclass: Caenogastropoda
- Order: Neogastropoda
- Superfamily: Buccinoidea
- Family: Columbellidae
- Genus: Zafra
- Species: Z. alternata

Binomial name
- Zafra alternata (Gould, 1860)

Synonyms
- Columbella alternata Gould, 1860 (original combination)

Species of gastropod

Zafra alternata is a species of sea snail in the family Columbellidae, the dove snails.

== Description ==
The length of the shell attains 2.5 mm.

(Original description in Latin) The small shell is elongated-ovate, shiny, stramineous with elongated red spots intermittently striped, doubled at the body whorl. The shell contains five whorls, decorated with 12 obtuse prominent ribs and scrolling stripes. The aperture is narrow.The outer lip is thickened and crenate inside.

It is sufficiently designated by its stripes of elongated spots arranged on alternate folds.

== Distribution ==
This marine species was found off Réunion, Indian Ocean, and off Hong Kong Island.
