= Zafra morini =

Scientific classification
- Kingdom: Animalia
- Phylum: Mollusca
- Class: Gastropoda
- Subclass: Caenogastropoda
- Order: Neogastropoda
- Superfamily: Buccinoidea
- Family: Columbellidae
- Genus: Zafra
- Species: Z. morini

Binomial name
- Zafra morini (Viader, 1938)

Synonyms
- Pyrene morini Viader, 1938 (original combination)

Species of gastropod

Zafra morini is a species of sea snail in the family Columbellidae, the dove snails.

== Description ==
The length of the shell attains 3 mm.

== Distribution ==
This marine species occurs off Réunion, Indian Ocean.
