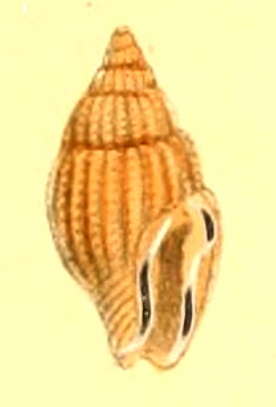
- Shell of Zafra brevissima (holotype)

Scientific classification
- Kingdom: Animalia
- Phylum: Mollusca
- Class: Gastropoda
- Subclass: Caenogastropoda
- Order: Neogastropoda
- Superfamily: Buccinoidea
- Family: Columbellidae
- Genus: Zafra
- Species: Z. brevissima

Binomial name
- Zafra brevissima (Hervier, 1900)

Synonyms
- Columbella brevissima Hervier, 1900 (original combination)

= Zafra brevissima =

Species of gastropod

Zafra brevissima is a species of sea snail in the family Columbellidae, the dove snails.

== Description ==
The length of the shell attains 3 mm, its diameter 1.5 mm.

== Distribution ==
This rare marine species occurs off Lifou Island, Loyalty Islands and off Papua New Guinea.
