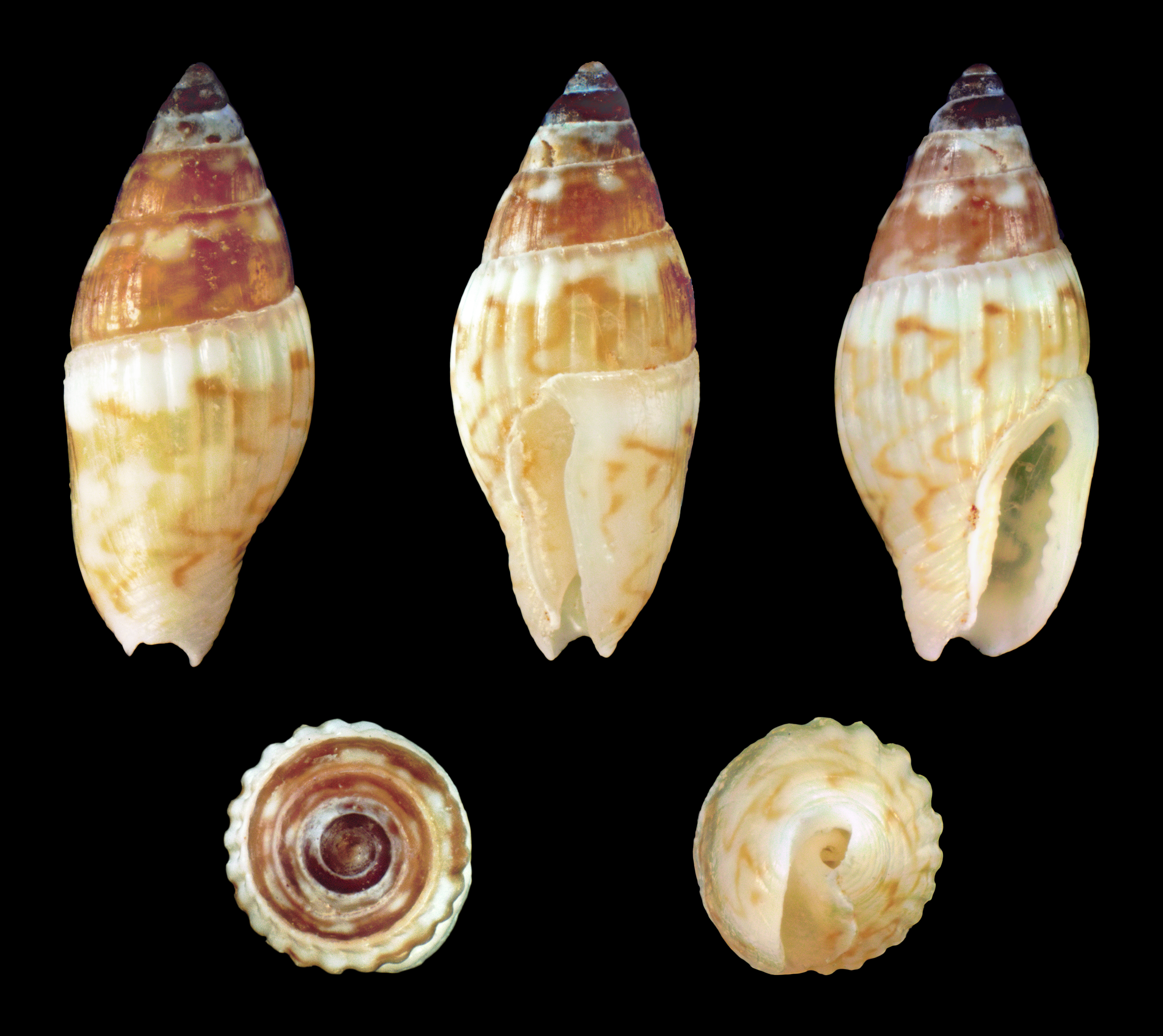
- Shell of Zafra hervieri

Scientific classification
- Kingdom: Animalia
- Phylum: Mollusca
- Class: Gastropoda
- Subclass: Caenogastropoda
- Order: Neogastropoda
- Superfamily: Buccinoidea
- Family: Columbellidae
- Genus: Zafra
- Species: Z. hervieri

Binomial name
- Zafra hervieri (Pace, 1903)

Synonyms
- Columbella hervieri Pace, 1903 (original combination); Columbella peasei var. influata Hervier, 1900; Columbella peasei var. lemniscata Hervier, 1900; Zafra lemniscata (Hervier, 1899)

= Zafra hervieri =

Species of gastropod

Zafra hervieri is a species of sea snail in the family Columbellidae, the dove snails.

== Description ==
The length of the shell attains 2.2 mm.

== Distribution ==
This marine species occurs off the Philippines, New Caledonia, and Two-Isles; Australia.
