= Zafra juttingae =

Scientific classification
- Kingdom: Animalia
- Phylum: Mollusca
- Class: Gastropoda
- Subclass: Caenogastropoda
- Order: Neogastropoda
- Superfamily: Buccinoidea
- Family: Columbellidae
- Genus: Zafra
- Species: †Z. juttingae

Binomial name
- †Zafra juttingae (Oostingh, 1940)

Synonyms
- † Anachis (Zafra) juttingae Oostingh, 1940

Species of gastropod

Zafra juttingae is an extinct species of sea snail in the family Columbellidae, the dove snails.

== Distribution ==
Fossils of this marine species were found in Pliocene strata in Java, Indonesia.
