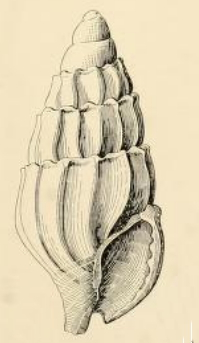
- Shell of Zafra babylonica (holotype)

Scientific classification
- Kingdom: Animalia
- Phylum: Mollusca
- Class: Gastropoda
- Subclass: Caenogastropoda
- Order: Neogastropoda
- Superfamily: Buccinoidea
- Family: Columbellidae
- Genus: Zafra
- Species: Z. babylonica

Binomial name
- Zafra babylonica (Hedley, 1907)

Synonyms
- Pyrene babylonica Hedley, 1907

= Zafra babylonica =

Species of gastropod

Zafra babylonica is a species of sea snail in the family Columbellidae, the dove snails.

== Description ==
The length of the shell attains 5.5 mm, its diameter 2.5 mm.

(Original description) The small, cream-coloured shell is solid and glossy. It has a conical shape, with a pointed apex and a contracted base. It contains 5½ whorls, the lower whorls narrowly but sharply tabulate.

Sculpture: the protoconch consists of a 1½ whorl and is smooth and very glossy. The next whorl is duller with incipient ribbing. On the last three whorls there are strong widely spaced perpendicular ribs, which on the penultimate whorl number fourteen. Below the periphery they gradually vanish, above they terminate in a blunt point. The summits are linked together by an indefinite spiral cord. The anterior extremity is scored by six fine spiral grooves. The aperture is oval and feebly denticulate within the outer lip. There is a thick callus on the columellar wall.

== Distribution ==
This marine species is endemic to Australia and was found off New South Wales
