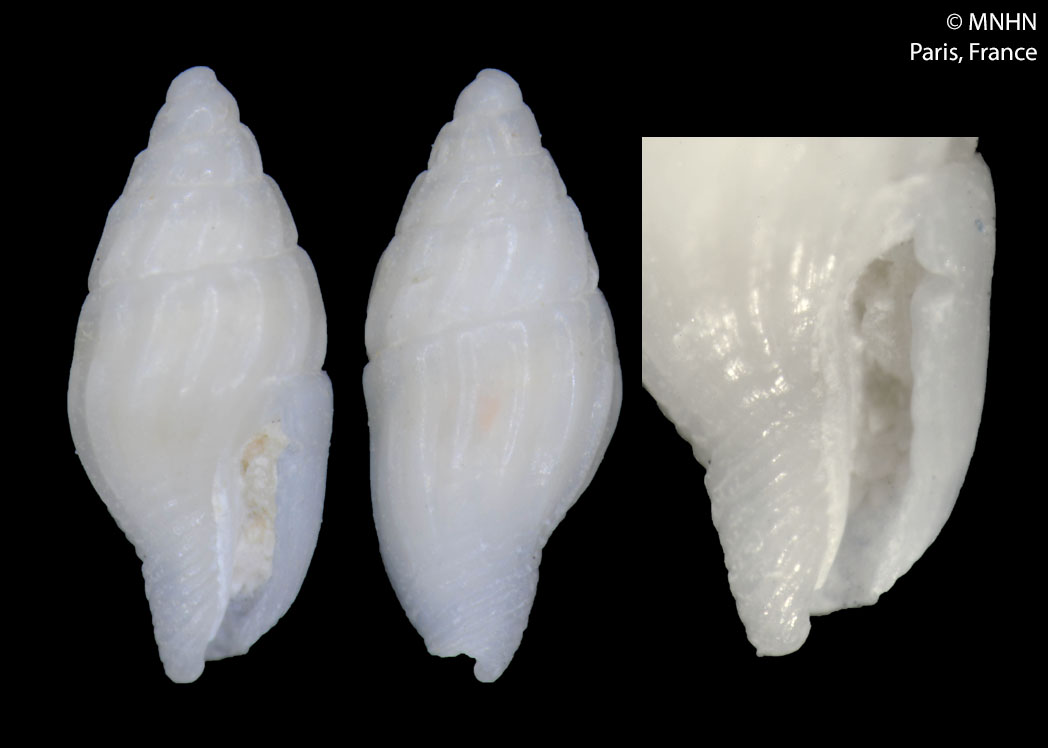
- Shell of Zafra dejugis (holotype at MNHN, Paris)

Scientific classification
- Kingdom: Animalia
- Phylum: Mollusca
- Class: Gastropoda
- Subclass: Caenogastropoda
- Order: Neogastropoda
- Superfamily: Buccinoidea
- Family: Columbellidae
- Genus: Zafra
- Species: Z. dejugis

Binomial name
- Zafra dejugis K. Monsecour & D. Monsecour, 2018

= Zafra dejugis =

Species of gastropod

Zafra dejugis is a species of sea snail in the family Columbellidae, the dove snails.

== Description ==
The length of the shell attains 3.1 mm.

== Distribution ==
This deep-water marine species occurs off New Caledonia.
