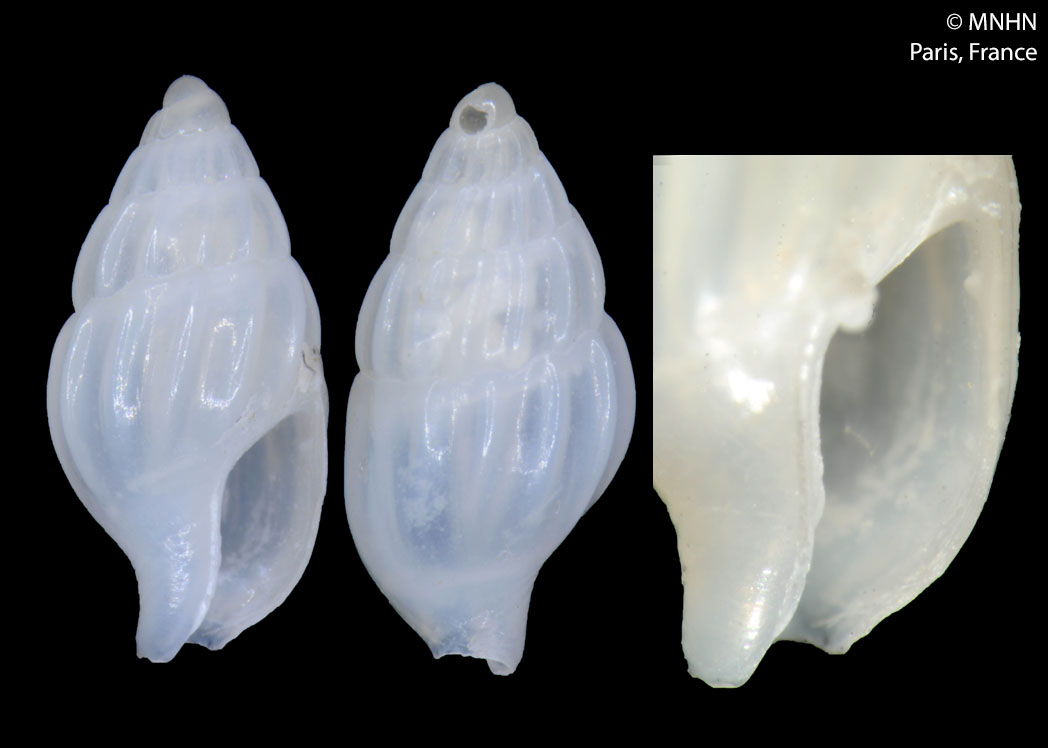
- Shell of Zafra stricosa (holotype at MNHN, Paris)

Scientific classification
- Kingdom: Animalia
- Phylum: Mollusca
- Class: Gastropoda
- Subclass: Caenogastropoda
- Order: Neogastropoda
- Superfamily: Buccinoidea
- Family: Columbellidae
- Genus: Zafra
- Species: Z. stricosa

Binomial name
- Zafra stricosa K. Monsecour & D. Monsecour, 2018

= Zafra stricosa =

Species of gastropod

Zafra stricosa is a species of sea snail in the family Columbellidae, the dove snails.

== Description ==
The length of the shell attains 4.7 mm.

== Distribution ==
This deep-water marine species occurs off New Caledonia.
