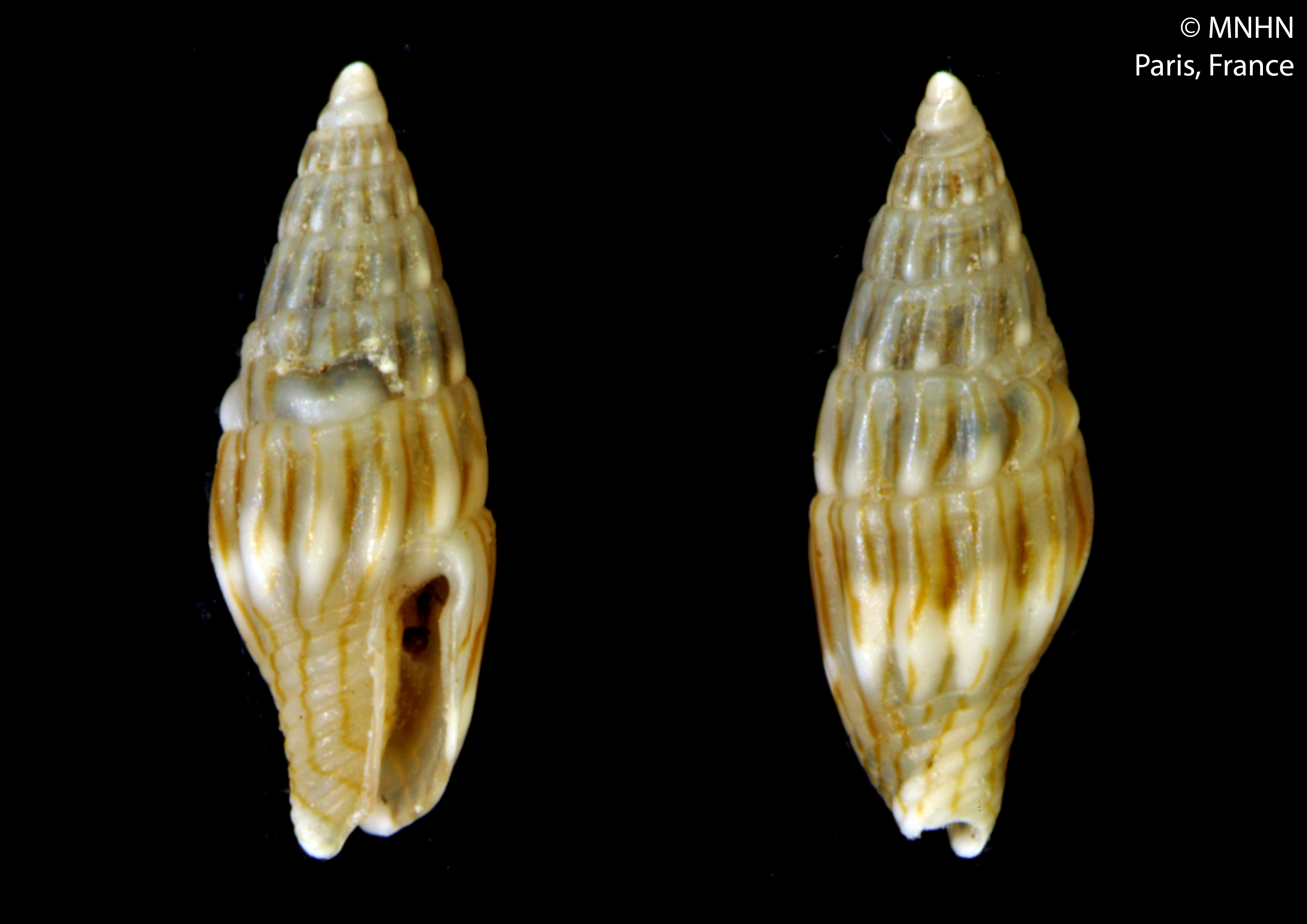
- Shell of Zafra brunneastriata (holotype at MNHN, Paris)

Scientific classification
- Kingdom: Animalia
- Phylum: Mollusca
- Class: Gastropoda
- Subclass: Caenogastropoda
- Order: Neogastropoda
- Superfamily: Buccinoidea
- Family: Columbellidae
- Genus: Zafra
- Species: Z. brunneastriata

Binomial name
- Zafra brunneastriata K. Monsecour & D. Monsecour, 2018

= Zafra brunneastriata =

Species of gastropod

Zafra brunneastriata is a species of sea snail, a marine gastropod mollusk in the family Columbellidae, also known as dove snails.

== Description ==
The length of the shell attains 4.1 mm.

== Distribution ==
This marine species occurs off the Marquesas Islands, French Polynesia.
