= Zafra opihiensis =

Scientific classification
- Kingdom: Animalia
- Phylum: Mollusca
- Class: Gastropoda
- Subclass: Caenogastropoda
- Order: Neogastropoda
- Superfamily: Buccinoidea
- Family: Columbellidae
- Genus: Zafra
- Species: †Z. opihiensis

Binomial name
- †Zafra opihiensis Laws, 1933

Species of gastropod

Zafra opihiensis is an extinct species of sea snail in the family Columbellidae, the dove snails.

== Distribution ==
Fossils of this marine species were found in Tertiary strata in New Zealand.
