= Zafra taylorae =

Scientific classification
- Kingdom: Animalia
- Phylum: Mollusca
- Class: Gastropoda
- Subclass: Caenogastropoda
- Order: Neogastropoda
- Family: Columbellidae
- Genus: Zafra
- Species: Z. taylorae

Binomial name
- Zafra taylorae Raines, 2002

Species of gastropod

Zafra taylorae is a species of sea snail in the family Columbellidae, the dove snails.

== Distribution ==
This marine species occurs off Easter Island.
