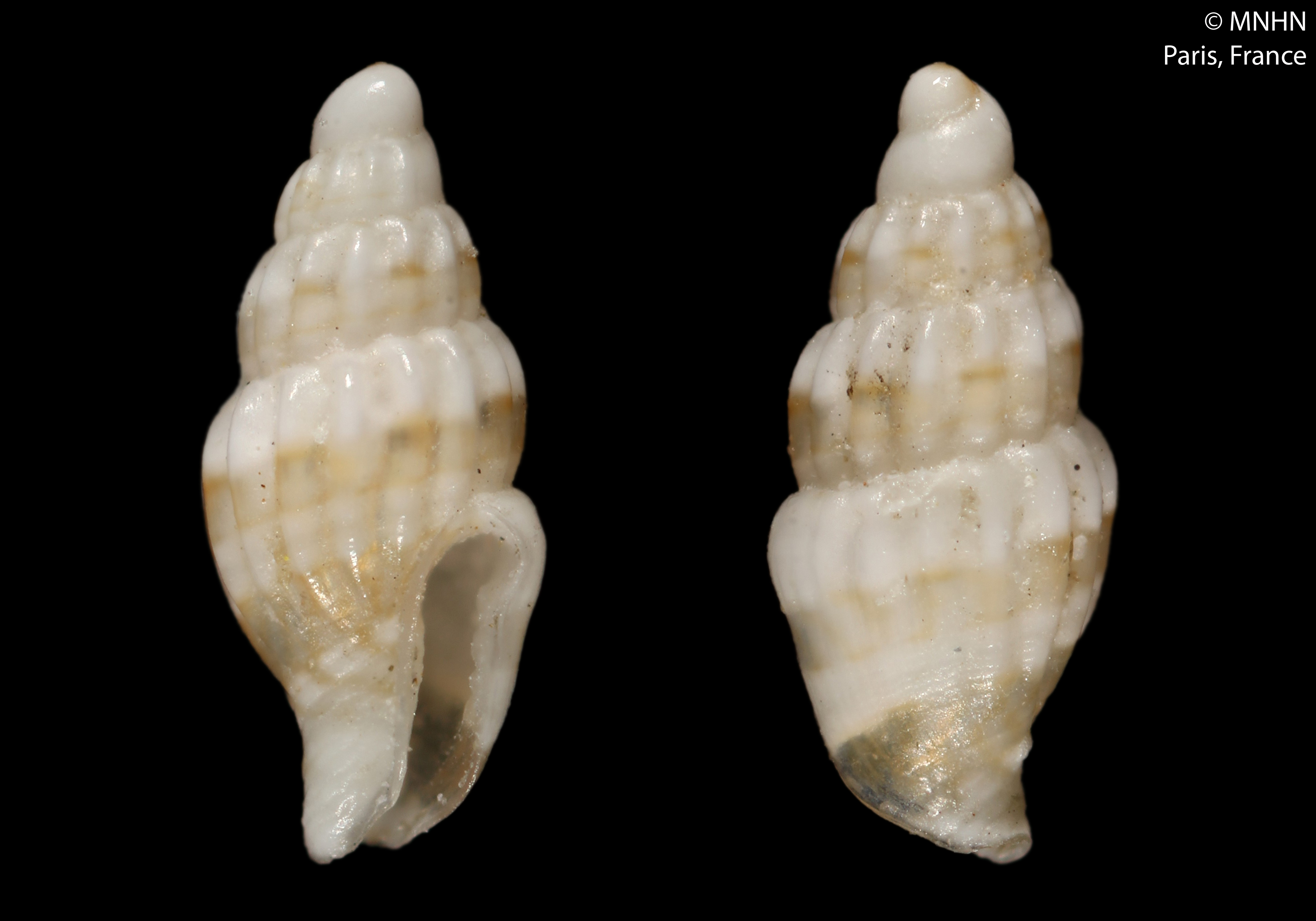
- Shell of Zafra geyserensis (holotype at the MNHN, Paris)

Scientific classification
- Kingdom: Animalia
- Phylum: Mollusca
- Class: Gastropoda
- Subclass: Caenogastropoda
- Order: Neogastropoda
- Superfamily: Buccinoidea
- Family: Columbellidae
- Genus: Zafra
- Species: Z. geyserensis

Binomial name
- Zafra geyserensis Drivas & M. Jay, 1997

= Zafra geyserensis =

Species of gastropod

Zafra geyserensis is a species of sea snail in the family Columbellidae, the dove snails.

== Description ==
The length of the shell attains 2 mm, its diameter 0.6 mm.

== Distribution ==
This marine species occurs in the Mozambique Channel.
