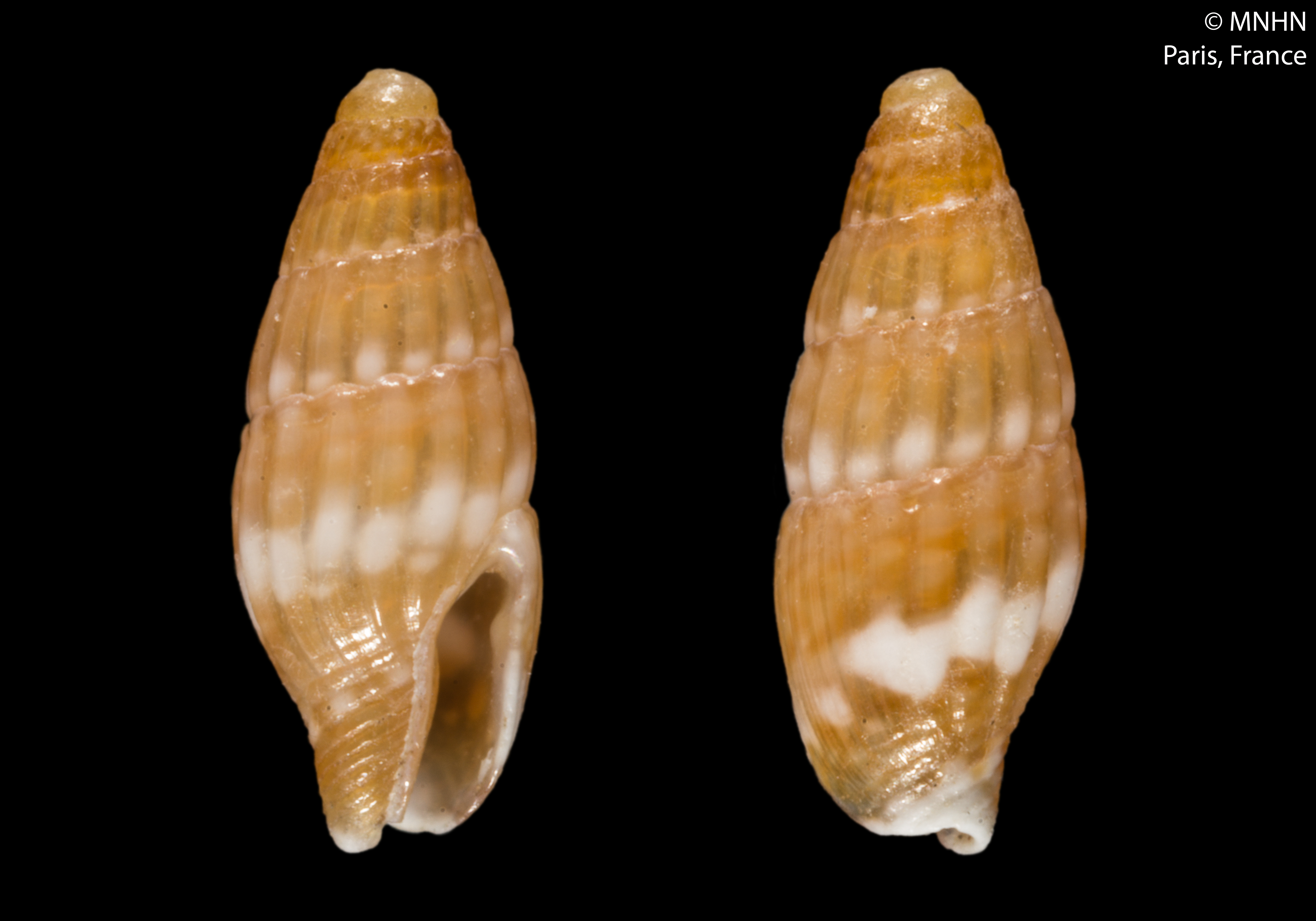
- Shell of Zafra cinnamomea (syntype)

Scientific classification
- Kingdom: Animalia
- Phylum: Mollusca
- Class: Gastropoda
- Subclass: Caenogastropoda
- Order: Neogastropoda
- Superfamily: Buccinoidea
- Family: Columbellidae
- Genus: Zafra
- Species: Z. cinnamomea

Binomial name
- Zafra cinnamomea (Hervier, 1900)

Synonyms
- Columbella peasei var. cinnamomea Hervier, 1900 (original combination)

= Zafra cinnamomea =

Species of gastropod

Zafra cinnamomea is a species of sea snail in the family Columbellidae, the dove snails.

== Description ==
The length of the shell attains 3 mm, its diameter is 1.5 mm.

(Original description in French) This small columbellid, measuring about 3 millimetres, is oblong and elongate. The shell is rather thin and very glossy, with a light horn-like ground colour, and is encircled at the base of the whorls by a band of opaque white that extends to a greater or lesser degree over the periphery of the body whorl. Above this band, the shell shows irregular reddish reticulations. The coloration is highly variable and may differ from one whorl to another on the same individual.

There are six to seven whorls in total. The three embryonic whorls are rounded, smooth, and of a horny tone, whereas the subsequent whorls are convex and well staged by a thickened suture. The longitudinal costulations are numerous, closely set, and confluent at their bases; they are blunt on the crest, very smooth, and highly polished. The body whorl is convex and usually only slightly swollen at the periphery, and it is weakly attenuated below, where the costulations are replaced by elevated cords encircling the base.

The aperture occupies a little more than one-third of the total shell height. It is narrow and flexuous, with a continuous peristome that rises as a small crest along the columella. The interior retains the general tone of the external coloration. The outer lip is flatly convex, simple, and sharp at the edge, and is very distinctly and strongly sinuous just below the suture; it is slightly thickened within, beneath the sinus, and lacks any folds.

This species varies in coloration up to a dark brown.

== Distribution ==
This marine species occurs off Lifou Island, Loyalty Islands.
