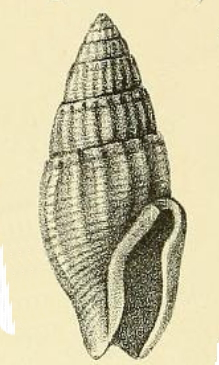
- Shell of Zafra townsendi (holotype)

Scientific classification
- Kingdom: Animalia
- Phylum: Mollusca
- Class: Gastropoda
- Subclass: Caenogastropoda
- Order: Neogastropoda
- Superfamily: Buccinoidea
- Family: Columbellidae
- Genus: Zafra
- Species: Z. townsendi

Binomial name
- Zafra townsendi (Melvill & Standen, 1901)

Synonyms
- Columbella (Seminella) townsendi Melvill & Standen, 1901 superseded combination; Columbella townsendi Melvill & Standen, 1901 (original combination)

= Zafra townsendi =

Species of gastropod

Zafra townsendi is a species of sea snail in the family Columbellidae, the dove snails.

== Description ==
The shell grows to a length of 3.5 mm, its diameter 1.5 mm.

The minute shell contains 6-7 whorls, of which 1½ in the protoconch. There appear to exist two varieties: one, the typical, uniformly thickly ribbed, chestnut or brown unicolorous, crossed by revolving lirae entirely over the surface. While the other is spirally banded with darker brown, just where the lirae are present, they becoming either partially or entirely obsolete in the centre of the body whorl, and in this instance a central light fascia is exhibited.

The oblong aperture is narrow. The outer lip is incrassate and denticulate inside. The simple columella is upright.

== Distribution ==
This marine species occurs off Karachi, Pakistan coast.
