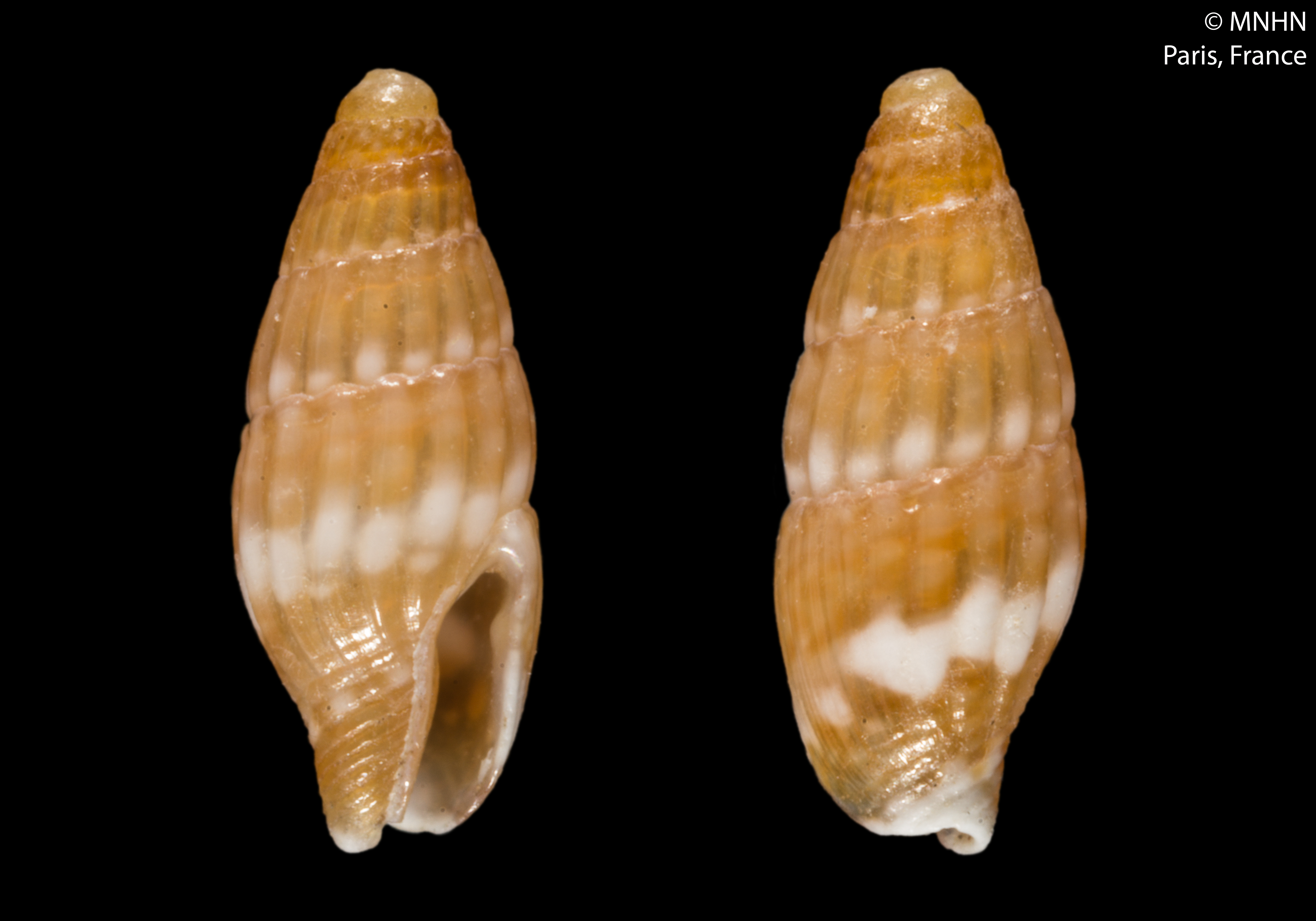
- Shell of Zafra cinnamomea

Scientific classification
- Kingdom: Animalia
- Phylum: Mollusca
- Class: Gastropoda
- Subclass: Caenogastropoda
- Order: Neogastropoda
- Superfamily: Buccinoidea
- Family: Columbellidae
- Genus: Zafra; Adams, 1860

Type species
- Zafra mitriformis A. Adams, 1860

Synonyms
- Anachis (Zafra) A. Adams, 1860 ·; Columbella (Zafra)A. Adams, 1860 ·; Pyrene (Zafra) A. Adams, 1860 ·

= Zafra (gastropod) =

Genus of gastropods

Zafra is a large genus of sea snails in the family Columbellidae, the dove snails.

== Description ==
The shells are typically small. They are elongated and conical, often featuring sculptured patterns of fine ribs or spiral ridges. The aperture of the shell is usually narrow and elongated, with a distinct, but short siphonal canal. The shells are often adorned with intricate patterns, including coloration variations.

== Distribution ==
These gastropods are widely distributed in tropical and subtropical seas, inhabiting various marine environments such as rocky shores, sandy bottoms, and coral reefs.

== Feeding behavior ==
Zafra snails are carnivorous predators. They use a specialized proboscis to capture and consume their prey. Once captured, the prey is immobilized, and digestive enzymes are secreted to break down the tissues for ingestion.

== Species ==
As of August 2020, there are about 80 species within the genus Zafra:

- Zafra aequatorialis (Thiele, 1925)
- Zafra albumbrunneis Poppe & Tagaro, 2026 (original description)
- Zafra alternata (Gould, 1860)
- Zafra ambonensis de Maintenon, 2008
- Zafra atrata (Gould, 1860)
- Zafra australensis K. Monsecour & D. Monsecour, 2015
- Zafra babylonica (Hedley, 1907)
- Zafra bilineata de Maintenon, 2008
- Zafra brevissima (Hervier, 1899)
- Zafra brunneastriata K. Monsecour & D. Monsecour, 2018
- Zafra cinnamomea (Hervier, 1899)
- Zafra darwini (Angas, 1877)
- Zafra debilis Hedley, 1915
- Zafra dejugis K. Monsecour & D. Monsecour, 2016
- Zafra digglesi Brazier, 1874
- Zafra exilis (Philippi, 1849)
- Zafra farasanensis Neubert, 1998
- Zafra fuscolineata Oliver, 1915
- Zafra fuscomaculata (Thiele, 1925)
- Zafra geyserensis Drivas & Jay, 1997
- Zafra gracilenta K. Monsecour & D. Monsecour, 2016
- Zafra hahajimana (Pilsbry, 1904)
- Zafra hedleyi (Thiele, 1930)
- Zafra hervieri (Pace, 1902)
- † Zafra impedita Laws, 1940
- † Zafra juttingae (Oostingh, 1940)
- Zafra kaicherae Drivas & Jay, 1990
- Zafra kermadecensis Oliver, 1915
- Zafra marisrubris Neubert, 1998
- Zafra melitoma (Melvill & Standen, 1901)
- Zafra microstoma (Thiele, 1925)
- Zafra minuta (Gould, 1860)
- Zafra mitriformis A. Adams, 1860
- Zafra morini (Viader, 1938)
- Zafra niasensis (Thiele, 1925)
- Zafra nukuhiva K. Monsecour & D. Monsecour, 2018
- Zafra obesula (Hervier, 1899)
- Zafra ocellatula (Hervier, 1899)
- † Zafra opihiensis Laws, 1933
- Zafra ornata (Pease, 1868)
- Zafra padangensis (Thiele, 1925)
- Zafra parilis K. Monsecour & D. Monsecour, 2016
- Zafra paulina (Thiele, 1925)
- Zafra phaula (Melvill & Standen, 1901)
- Zafra pumila (Dunker, 1858)
- Zafra rapanuiensis Raines, 2002
- Zafra rufopiperata (E.A. Smith, 1884)
- Zafra salutaris (Melvill, 1910)
- Zafra savignyi (Moazzo, 1939)
- Zafra saviniae (Viader, 1951)
- Zafra selasphora (Melvill & Standen, 1901)
- Zafra semiclatriata Sleurs, 1987
- Zafra seminulum (Thiele, 1925)
- Zafra smithi (Angas, 1877)
- Zafra stricosa K. Monsecour & D. Monsecour, 2016
- Zafra subvitrea (E.A. Smith, 1879)
- Zafra succinea (Hervier, 1899)
- Zafra taylorae Raines, 2002
- Zafra townsendi (Melvill & Standen, 1901)
- Zafra troglodytes (Souverbie in Souverbie & Montrouzier, 1866)
- Zafra ulinganensis Sleurs, 1987
- Zafra vercoi (Thiele, 1930)
- Zafra vexillum Bozzetti, 2008

Synonyms:

- Zafra albomarginata Okamoto & Habe, 1979: synonym of Mokumea albomarginata (Okamoto & Habe, 1979) (original combination)
- Zafra almiranta Hedley, 1915: synonym of Zafra darwini (Angas, 1877)
- Zafra altispira Bozzetti, 2008: synonym of Smithena altispira (Bozzetti, 2008)
- Zafra avicennia Hedley, 1915: synonym of Zafra pumila (Dunker, 1860)
- Zafra comistea (Melvill, 1906): synonym of Seminella comistea (Melvill, 1906)
- Zafra minuscula (Gould, 1860): synonym of Zafra pumila (Dunker, 1860)
- Zafra pascua Hertlein, 1962: synonym of Nodochila pascua (Hertlein, 1962) (original combination)
- Zafra paumotensis (Tryon, 1883): synonym of Mitropsis paumotensis (Tryon, 1883)
- Zafra peasei (E. von Martens & Langkavel, 1871): synonym of Seminella peasei (E. von Martens & Langkavel, 1871) (superseded combination)
- Zafra polita G. Nevill & H. Nevill, 1875: synonym of Ascalista polita (G. Nevill & H. Nevill, 1875) (original combination)
- Zafra pupoidea H. Adams, 1872: synonym of Iredalea pupoidea (H. Adams, 1872) (superseded combination)
- Zafra purpurea H. Adams, 1873: synonym of Seminella peasei (E. von Martens & Langkavel, 1871) (junior subjective synonym)
- Zafra sinensis (G. B. Sowerby III, 1894): synonym of Zafra troglodytes (Souverbie, 1866)
- Zafra validicosta Habe, 1960: synonym of Zafra mitriformis A. Adams, 1860
- Zafra virginea (Gould, 1860): synonym of Seminella virginea (Gould, 1860)
