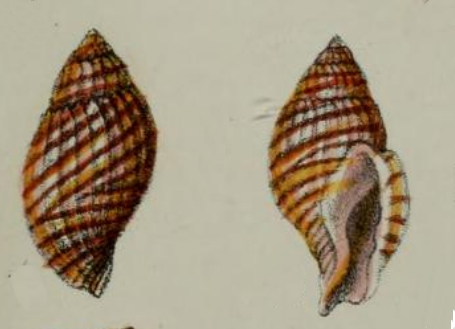
- Shell of Zafra digglesi (holotype)

Scientific classification
- Kingdom: Animalia
- Phylum: Mollusca
- Class: Gastropoda
- Subclass: Caenogastropoda
- Order: Neogastropoda
- Superfamily: Buccinoidea
- Family: Columbellidae
- Genus: Zafra
- Species: Z. digglesi

Binomial name
- Zafra digglesi (Brazier, 1875)

Synonyms
- Columbella (Anachis) digglesi Brazier, 1875 (original combination)

= Zafra digglesi =

Species of gastropod

Zafra digglesi is a species of sea snail in the family Columbellidae, the dove snails.

== Description ==
The oblong-ovate shell is thin and glassy. It is whitish, marked with oblique reddish lines. The shell is longitudinally narrowly ribbed. The shell contains 5½ whorls, tabled at the suture. The apex is acute and light blue. The aperture is ear-shaped and half the length of the shell. The outer lip is minutely denticulated within. The columella is curved and finely striated, with a callus extending to the upper part. The siphonal canal is short.

== Distribution ==
This deep-water marine species occurs off Queensland, Australia.
