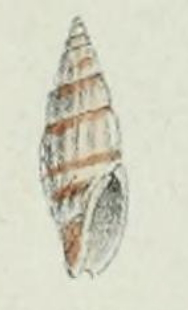
- Shell of Zafra subvitrea (holotype)

Scientific classification
- Kingdom: Animalia
- Phylum: Mollusca
- Class: Gastropoda
- Subclass: Caenogastropoda
- Order: Neogastropoda
- Superfamily: Buccinoidea
- Family: Columbellidae
- Genus: Zafra
- Species: Z. subvitrea

Binomial name
- Zafra subvitrea (E. A. Smith, 1879)

Synonyms
- Columbella (Zafra) subvitrea E. A. Smith, 1879 (basionym); Columbella subvitrea E. A. Smith, 1879 (original combination)

= Zafra subvitrea =

Species of gastropod

Zafra subvitrea is a species of sea snail in the family Columbellidae, the dove snails.

== Description ==
The length of the shell attains 4 mm, its diameter 1½ mm.

(Original description) The shell is fusiformly ovate and subpellucid. It is white, with a thin indistinct brown line interrupted by the ribs around the lower part of the whorls, and a transparent pellucid zone at the top, with a second band or series of short flames just below the middle of the body whorl, which is stained with brown at the extremity.

The shell contains seven whorls. The first two are convex and smooth. The following two or two and a half are almost flat and likewise smooth, the rest strongly costate. There are about eleven ribs on a whorl. They are rounded, a little oblique, and more or less arcuate, narrowed and subobsolete at the upper extremity, disappearing a little below the middle of the body-whorl. The lower extremity or cauda of which is transversely and a little obliquely sculptured with five or six striae, whereof the two or three uppermost are wider apart than the rest. The aperture is narrow, occupying rather less than half the shell's entire length. The outer lip is thin, faintly and broadly emarginate, or sinuated just beneath the suture and smooth within. The columella is a trifle oblique, tinged with brown, a little convex or swollen at the middle, covered with a thin callosity with a defined margin, which unites at the upper extremity with the termination of the outer lip. The siphonal canal is short, rather deep, and in a slight measure recurving.

== Distribution ==
This marine species occurs off Japan.
