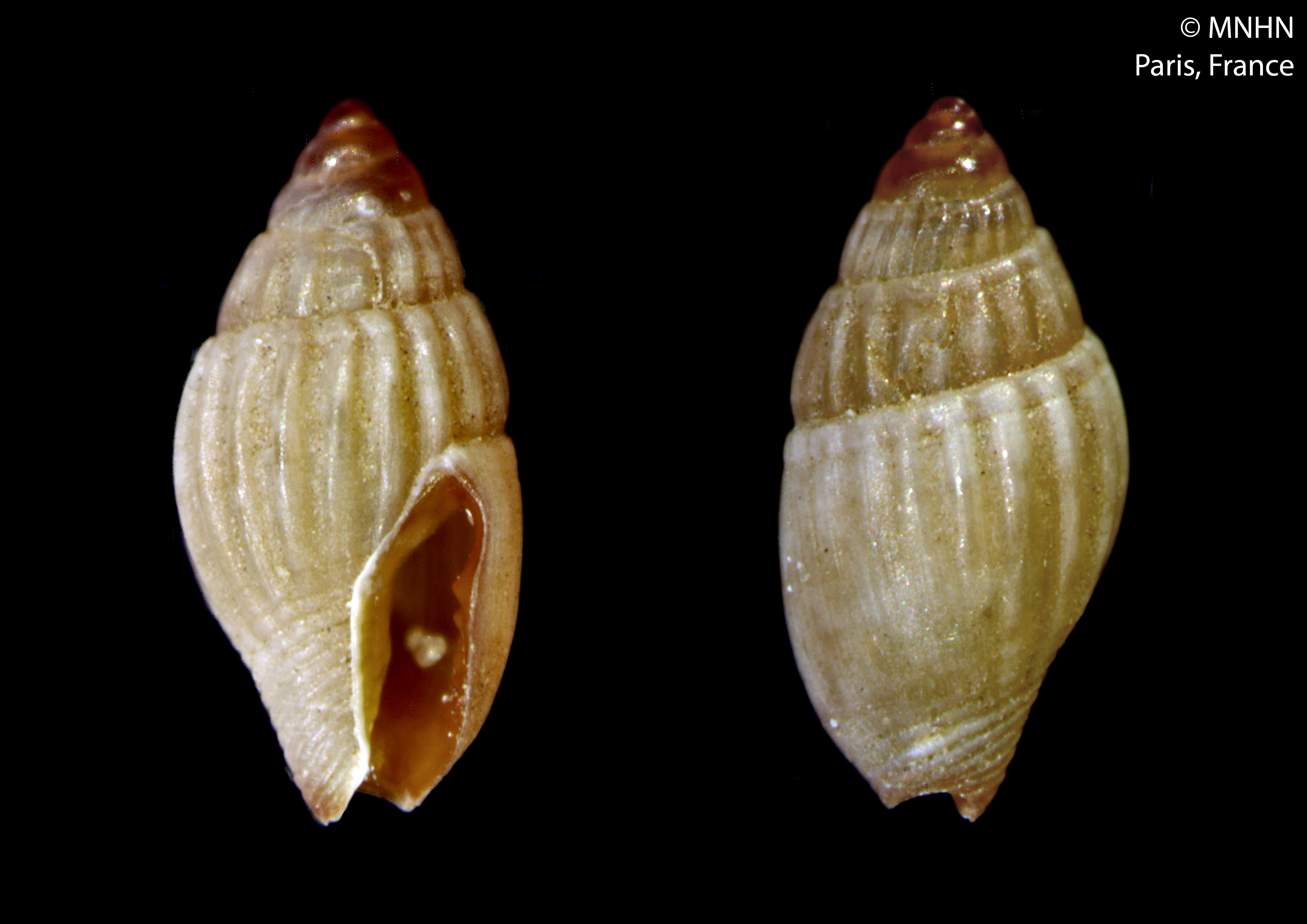
- Shell of Zafra nukuhiva (holotype at MNHN, Paris)

Scientific classification
- Kingdom: Animalia
- Phylum: Mollusca
- Class: Gastropoda
- Subclass: Caenogastropoda
- Order: Neogastropoda
- Superfamily: Buccinoidea
- Family: Columbellidae
- Genus: Zafra
- Species: Z. nukuhiva

Binomial name
- Zafra nukuhiva K. Monsecour & D. Monsecour, 2018

= Zafra nukuhiva =

Species of gastropod

Zafra nukuhiva is a species of sea snail in the family Columbellidae, the dove snails.

== Description ==
The length of the shell attains 2.4mm. It is distinguished from other Zafra by its small brown shell with orange protoconch.

== Distribution ==
This marine species occurs off the Marquesas Islands, French Polynesia.
