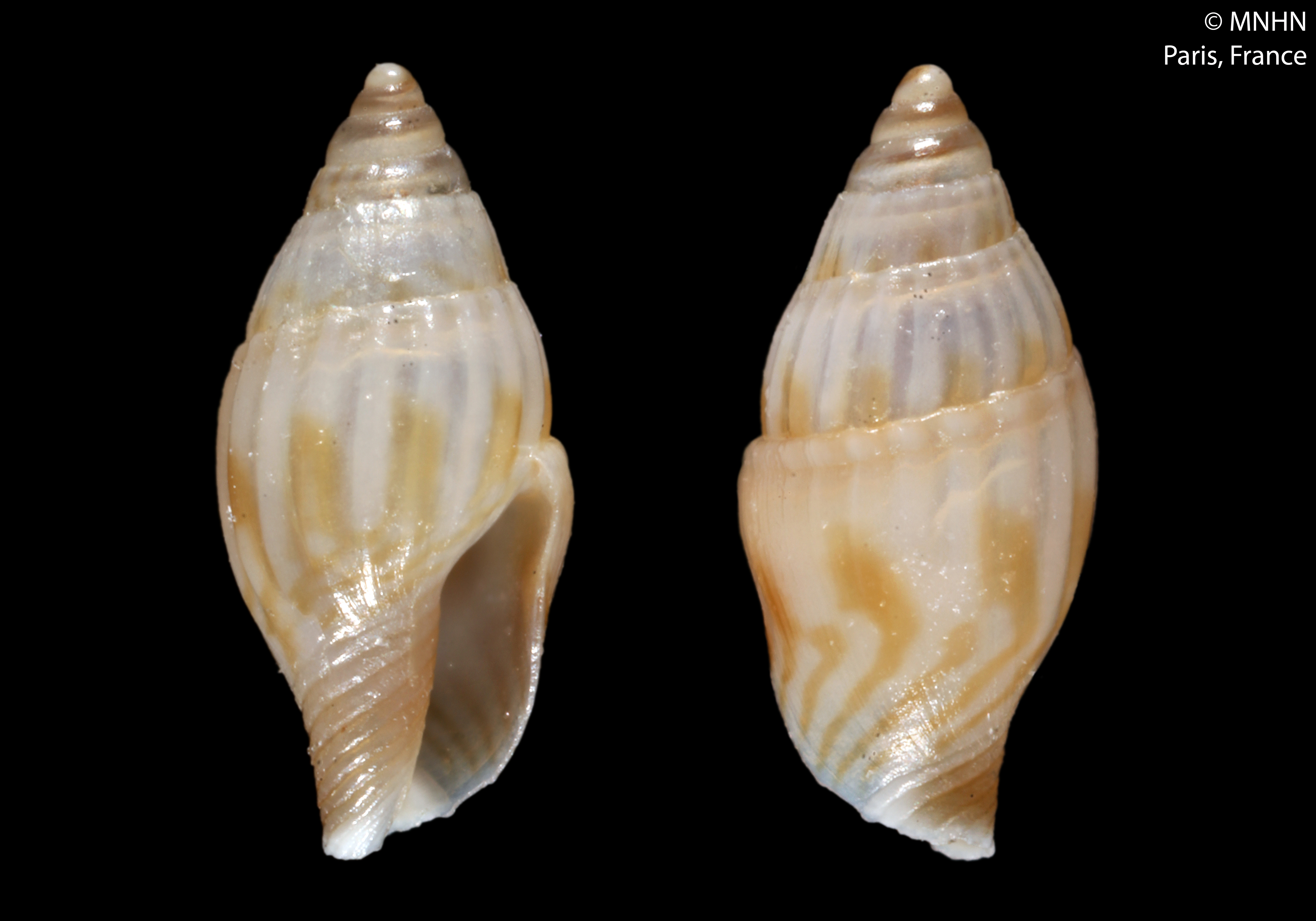
- Shell of Zafra kaicherae (holotype at MNHN, Paris)

Scientific classification
- Kingdom: Animalia
- Phylum: Mollusca
- Class: Gastropoda
- Subclass: Caenogastropoda
- Order: Neogastropoda
- Superfamily: Buccinoidea
- Family: Columbellidae
- Genus: Zafra
- Species: Z. kaicherae

Binomial name
- Zafra kaicherae Drivas & M. Jay, 1990

= Zafra kaicherae =

Species of gastropod

Zafra kaicherae is a species of sea snail in the family Columbellidae, the dove snails.

== Description ==
The length of the shell attains 3 mm.

== Distribution ==
This marine species occurs off Réunion, Indian Ocean.
