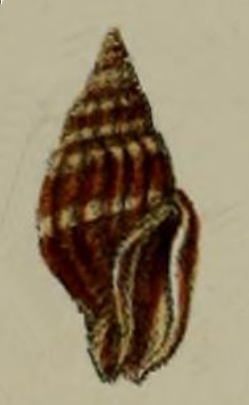
- Shell of Zafra smithi (holotype)

Scientific classification
- Kingdom: Animalia
- Phylum: Mollusca
- Class: Gastropoda
- Subclass: Caenogastropoda
- Order: Neogastropoda
- Superfamily: Buccinoidea
- Family: Columbellidae
- Genus: Zafra
- Species: Z. smithi

Binomial name
- Zafra smithi (Angas, 1877)

Synonyms
- Anachis smithi (Angas, 1877).; Columbella lentiginosa Angas, G.F. 1867.; Columbella (Anachis) smithi Angas, 1877 (original combination); Macrozafra smithi (Angas, 1877); Seminella smithi (Angas, 1877).

= Zafra smithi =

Species of gastropod

Zafra smithi is a species of sea snail in the family Columbellidae, the dove snails.

== Description ==
The length of the shell attains 3 mm.

(Original description) The shell is elongately ovate and moderately solid, presenting a purplish olive hue. It features a band of white dots just below the suture, and another encircles the middle of the body whorl. The 6 whorls are strongly and closely longitudinally ribbed, with the ribs becoming evanescent towards the base of the lower whorl, which is transversely grooved. The aperture is narrowly subquadrate, and the siphonal canal is short, everted, and recurved.

== Distribution ==
The range of this marine species is unclear due to uncertaintly of identification. It is considered a tropical Indo-Pacific species by Kay (1979) and Beechey (2007), Wilson (1994) restricts it to New South Wales, and MacPherson & Gabriel (1962) list it from Victoria. This species also occurs off Hawaii.
