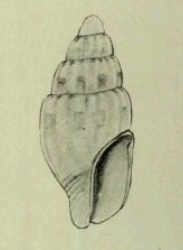
- Shell of Zafra fuscolineata (holotype)

Scientific classification
- Kingdom: Animalia
- Phylum: Mollusca
- Class: Gastropoda
- Subclass: Caenogastropoda
- Order: Neogastropoda
- Family: Columbellidae
- Genus: Zafra
- Species: Z. fuscolineata

Binomial name
- Zafra fuscolineata W. R. B. Oliver, 1915

= Zafra fuscolineata =

Species of gastropod

Zafra fuscolineata is a species of sea snail in the family Columbellidae, the dove snails.

== Description ==
The length of the shell varies between 2 mm to 5 mm; diameter 1 mm.

(Original description) The shell is broadly fusiform and truncate in front. The apex is obtuse. The shell contains five flatly rounded whorls. The suture is impressed. The oblong aperture is slightly produced in front. The outer edge is nearly straight. The inner edge is angled above. The shallow outer lip is thin with a sinus at the suture. The inner lip is thickened and straight below. The short siphonal canal is wide.

Sculpture: the smooth protoconch consists of 1½ whorls. The adult whorls show low, slightly oblique, axial ridges; about 15 on the penultimate whorl and become obsolete on the periphery of the body whorl. The concave interstices are very shallow. The base of the shell shows oblique grooves. Over the whole shell appear under the microscope fine close spiral striae.

Colour: The protoconch is white with a spiral brown band in the suture. The remainder of the shell is creamy white with a white peripheral band and light-brown spiral lines.

== Distribution ==
This marine species occurs off the Kermadec Islands, New Zealand
