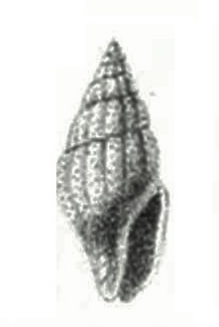
- Shell of Zafra rufopiperata (holotype)

Scientific classification
- Kingdom: Animalia
- Phylum: Mollusca
- Class: Gastropoda
- Subclass: Caenogastropoda
- Order: Neogastropoda
- Superfamily: Buccinoidea
- Family: Columbellidae
- Genus: Zafra
- Species: Z. rufopiperata

Binomial name
- Zafra rufopiperata (E. A. Smith, 1884)

Synonyms
- Columbella rufopiperata E. A. Smith, 1884 (original combination)

= Zafra rufopiperata =

Species of gastropod

Zafra rufopiperata is a species of sea snail in the family Columbellidae, the dove snails.

== Description ==
The length of the shell attains 3 mm, its diameter 1⅓ mm.

(Original description) The minute shell is ovate-fusiform. It is flesh-coloured, everywhere minutely dotted with red and marked with an indistinct pale line around the middle of the body whorl. The shell contain seven whorls, the three apical whorls smooth and convex; the rest somewhat gradated, flat at the sides, very strongly longitudinally costate. The twelve ribs are continuous up the spire, rounded and thick. Their upper end is crossed by a shallow groove, giving the whorls a margined appearance. The body whorl is convex at the middle, somewhat contracted below, transversely grooved at the base, with the ribs less strongly developed as the outer lip is approached. The aperture is very small and narrow, only slightly contracted into a short oblique siphonal canal. The outer lip is distinctly sinuated below the suture and thickened within. The columella is rounded, prominent at the middle, and covered with a callus.

== Distribution ==
This marine species occurs off Amirante Islands, Seychelles.
