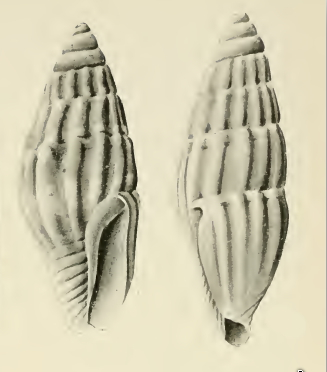
- Shell of Zafra debilis (holotype)

Scientific classification
- Kingdom: Animalia
- Phylum: Mollusca
- Class: Gastropoda
- Subclass: Caenogastropoda
- Order: Neogastropoda
- Superfamily: Buccinoidea
- Family: Columbellidae
- Genus: Zafra
- Species: Z. debilis

Binomial name
- Zafra debilis Hedley, 1915

Synonyms
- Anachis debilis (Hedley, 1915)

= Zafra debilis =

Species of gastropod

Zafra debilis is a species of sea snail in the family Columbellidae, the dove snails.

== Description ==
The length of the shell attains 4 mm, the diameter 1.1 mm.

(Original description) The small shell is thin, slender and conical. Its colour is fawn with an opaque white zone median on the body whorl, and supersutural on the spire. Sometimes there is also a white subsutural band, the white being plainer on the ribs than on the interstices. The shell contains seven gradate whorls.

Sculpture : the first three whorls are smooth, the remainder radially ribbed. The ribs are prominent, broad, vertical, spaced by about their breadth, continuing to the grooving at the base and to the aperture, discontinuous from whorl to whorl, amounting to fourteen on the body whorl. A slender subsutural cord connects the tops of the ribs. Beyond the ribs on the exterior extremity are eight, fine, spiral striae. The aperture is narrow, vertical, a little sinuous and contracted posteriorly. The inner lip shows a free elevate edge. The outer lip is simple. The siphonal canal is short and bent rather sharply backwards.

== Distribution ==
This marine species occurs off Tuamotu and North Queensland, Australia
