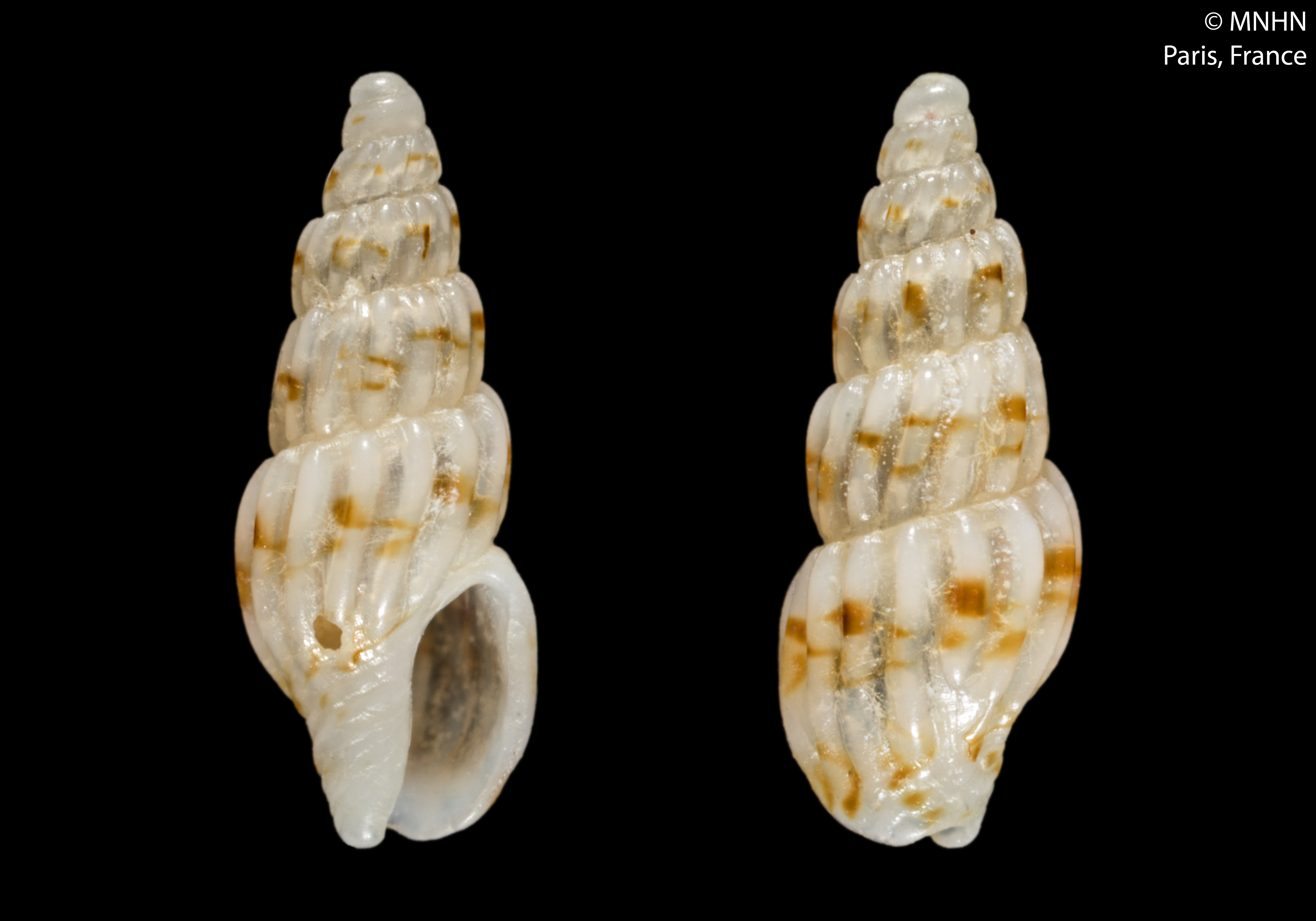

Scientific classification
- Kingdom: Animalia
- Phylum: Mollusca
- Class: Gastropoda
- Subclass: Caenogastropoda
- Order: Neogastropoda
- Family: Columbellidae
- Genus: Zafra
- Species: Z. altispira

Binomial name
- Zafra altispira Bozzetti, 2008

= Zafra altispira =

Species of gastropod

Zafra altispira is a species of sea snail in the family Columbellidae, the dove snails.
