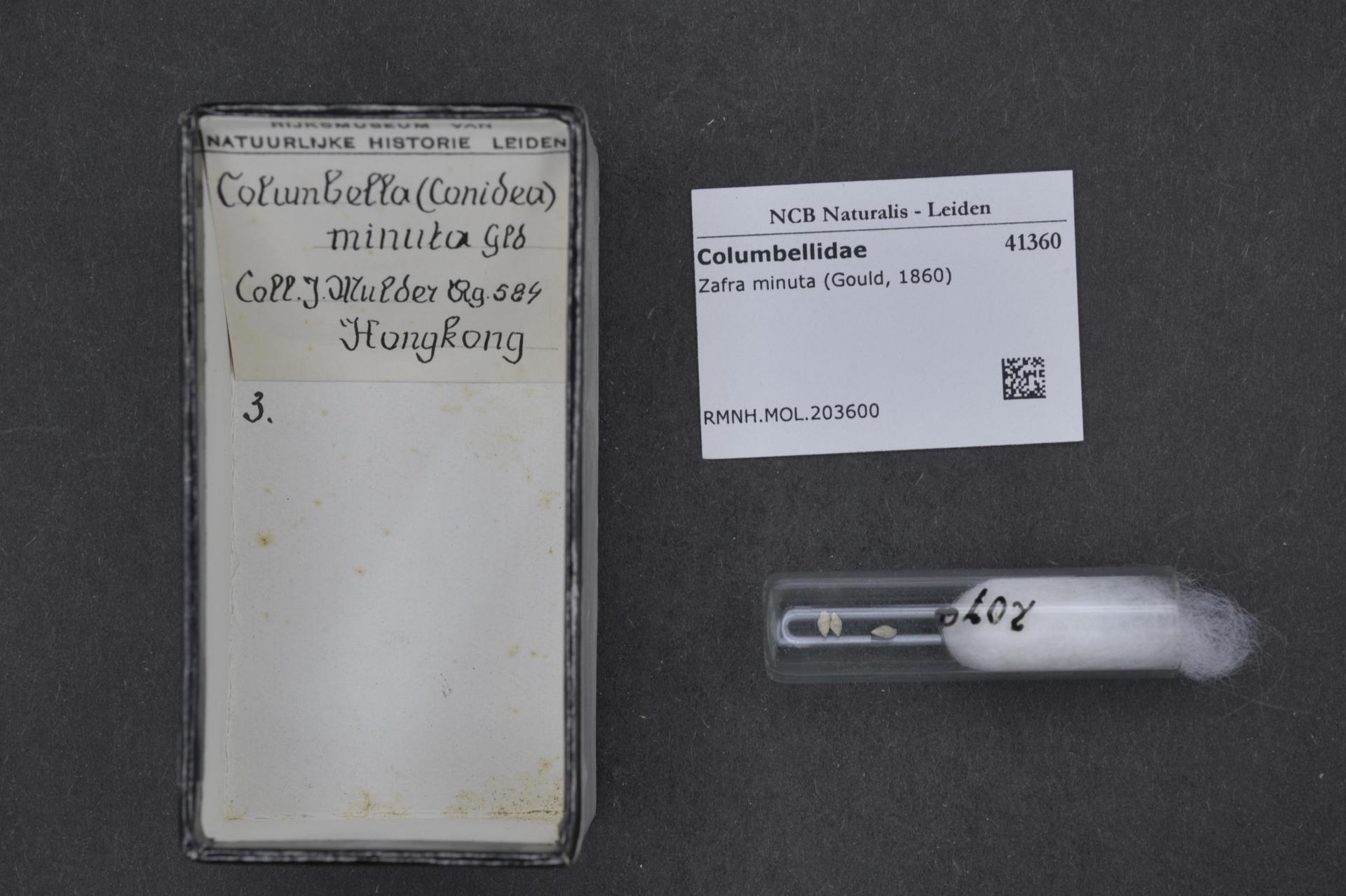
- Specimen of Zafra minuta at Naturalis Biodiversity Center

Scientific classification
- Kingdom: Animalia
- Phylum: Mollusca
- Class: Gastropoda
- Subclass: Caenogastropoda
- Order: Neogastropoda
- Superfamily: Buccinoidea
- Family: Columbellidae
- Genus: Zafra
- Species: Z. minuta

Binomial name
- Zafra minuta (Gould, 1860)

Synonyms
- Columbella (Anachis) minuta Gould, 1860 (basionym); Columbella malayensis Thiele, 1925 unaccepted; Columbella minuta Gould, 1860 (original combination)

= Zafra minuta =

Species of gastropod

Zafra minuta is a species of sea snail in the family Columbellidae, the dove snails.

== Description ==
The length of the shell attains 2.9 mm.

(Original description in Latin) The small, straw-coloured shell is oval and turreted. It is engraved with sharp folds (12) at the striae encircling the beak ending abruptly. It contains six well distinct whorls. The aperture is quite wide and nearly equals one third of the length of the shell. The inner lip is slightly convex

== Distribution ==
This marine species was found the Philippines and off Hong Kong Island.
