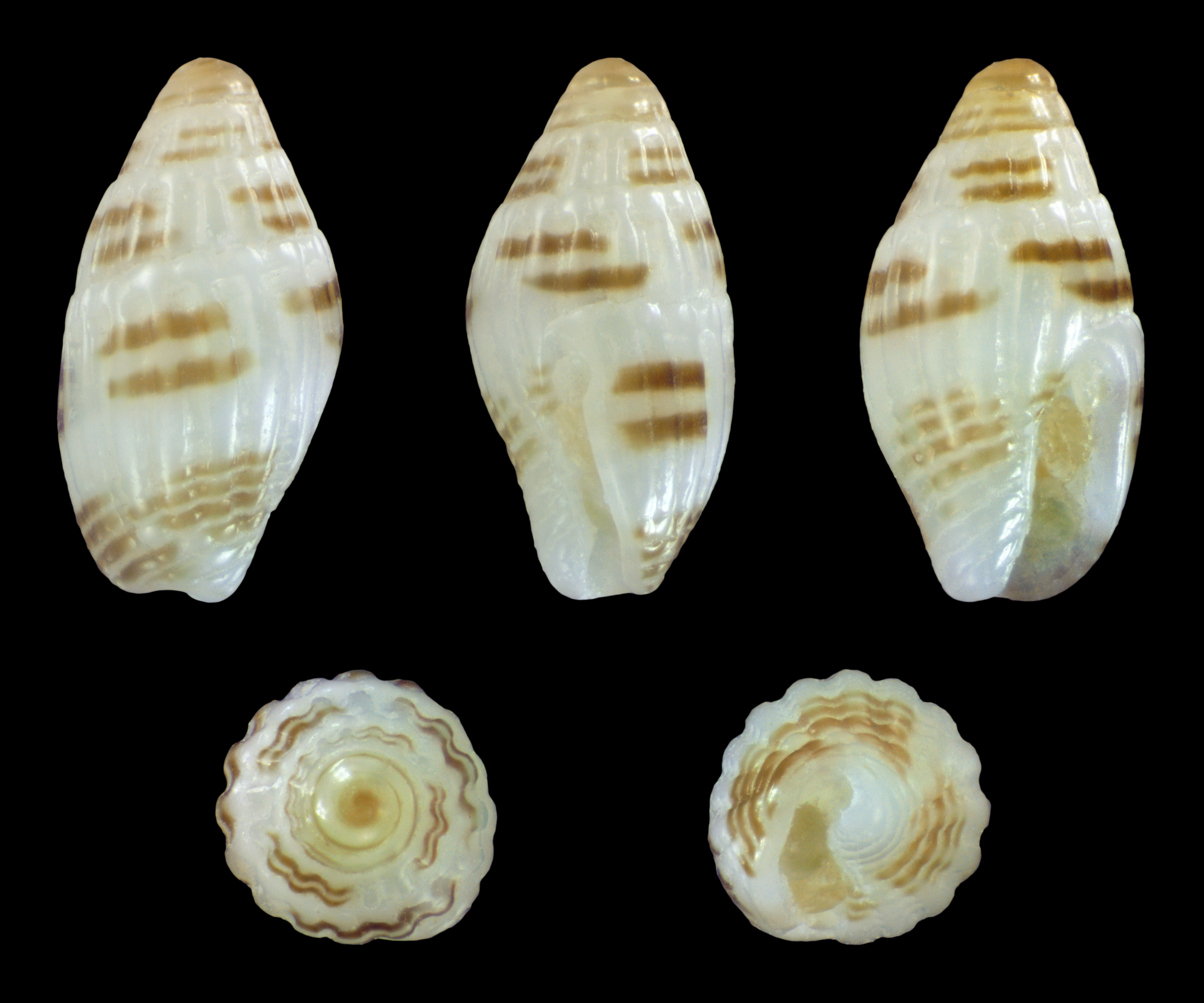

Scientific classification
- Kingdom: Animalia
- Phylum: Mollusca
- Class: Gastropoda
- Subclass: Caenogastropoda
- Order: Neogastropoda
- Family: Columbellidae
- Genus: Zafra
- Species: Z. bilineata

Binomial name
- Zafra bilineata de Maintenon, 2008

= Zafra bilineata =

Species of gastropod

Zafra bilineata is a species of sea snail in the family Columbellidae, the dove snails.

== Distribution ==
This marine species occurs off Ambon, Indonesia.
