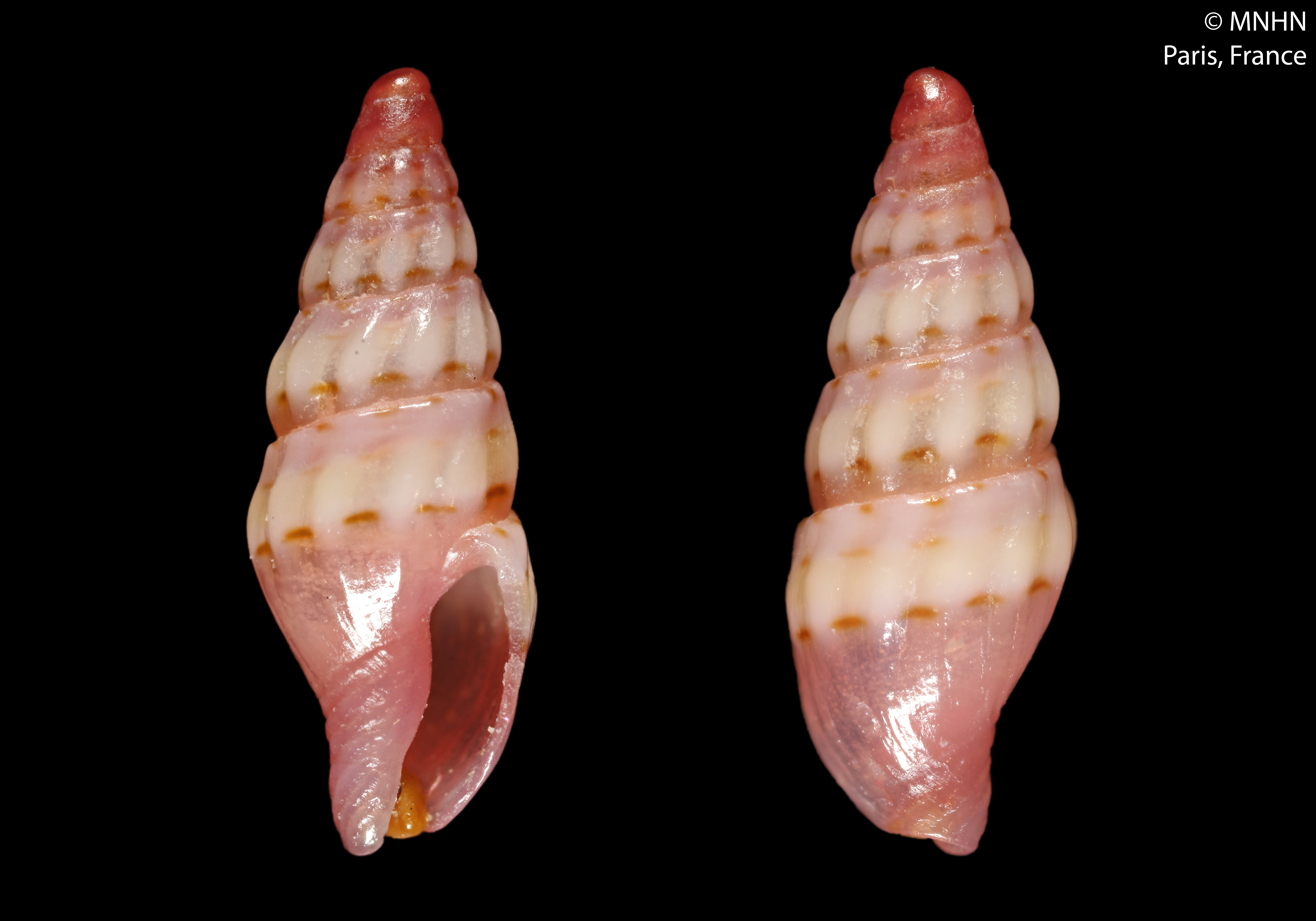
- Shell of Zafra vexillum (holotype at MNHN, paris)

Scientific classification
- Kingdom: Animalia
- Phylum: Mollusca
- Class: Gastropoda
- Subclass: Caenogastropoda
- Order: Neogastropoda
- Family: Columbellidae
- Genus: Zafra
- Species: Z. vexillum

Binomial name
- Zafra vexillum Bozzetti, 2008

= Zafra vexillum =

Species of gastropod

Zafra vexillum is a species of sea snail in the family Columbellidae, the dove snails.

== Description ==
The length of the shell attains 5 mm.

== Distribution ==
This marine species occurs off Madagascar.
