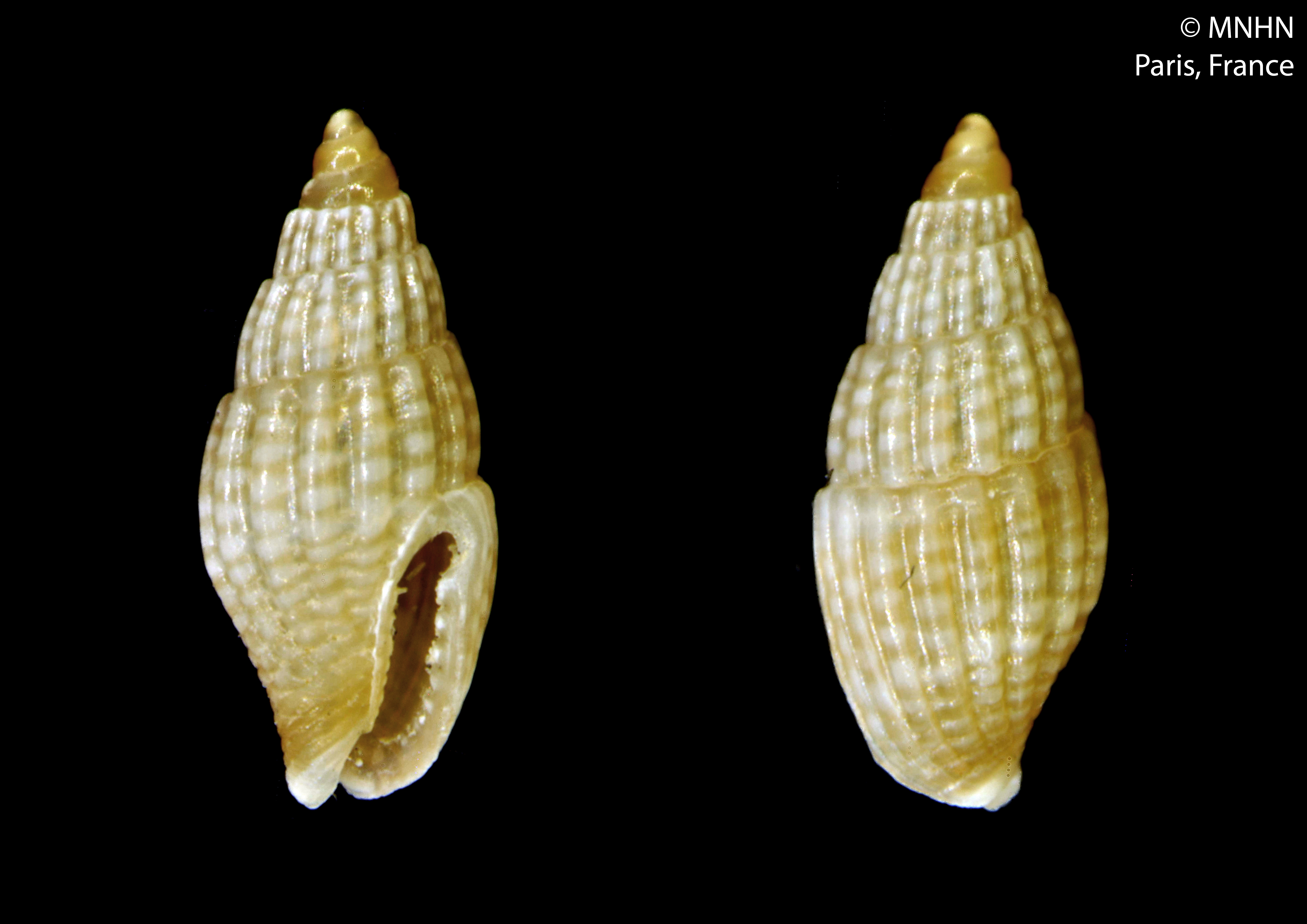
- Shell of Zafra semiclatriata (specimen at MNHN, Paris)

Scientific classification
- Kingdom: Animalia
- Phylum: Mollusca
- Class: Gastropoda
- Subclass: Caenogastropoda
- Order: Neogastropoda
- Superfamily: Buccinoidea
- Family: Columbellidae
- Genus: Zafra
- Species: Z. semiclatriata

Binomial name
- Zafra semiclatriata Sleurs, 1987

= Zafra semiclatriata =

Species of gastropod

Zafra semiclatriata is a species of sea snail in the family Columbellidae, the dove snails.

== Description ==
The length of the shell attains 5 mm.

== Distribution ==
This marine species occurs off Papua New Guinea and the Marquesas
