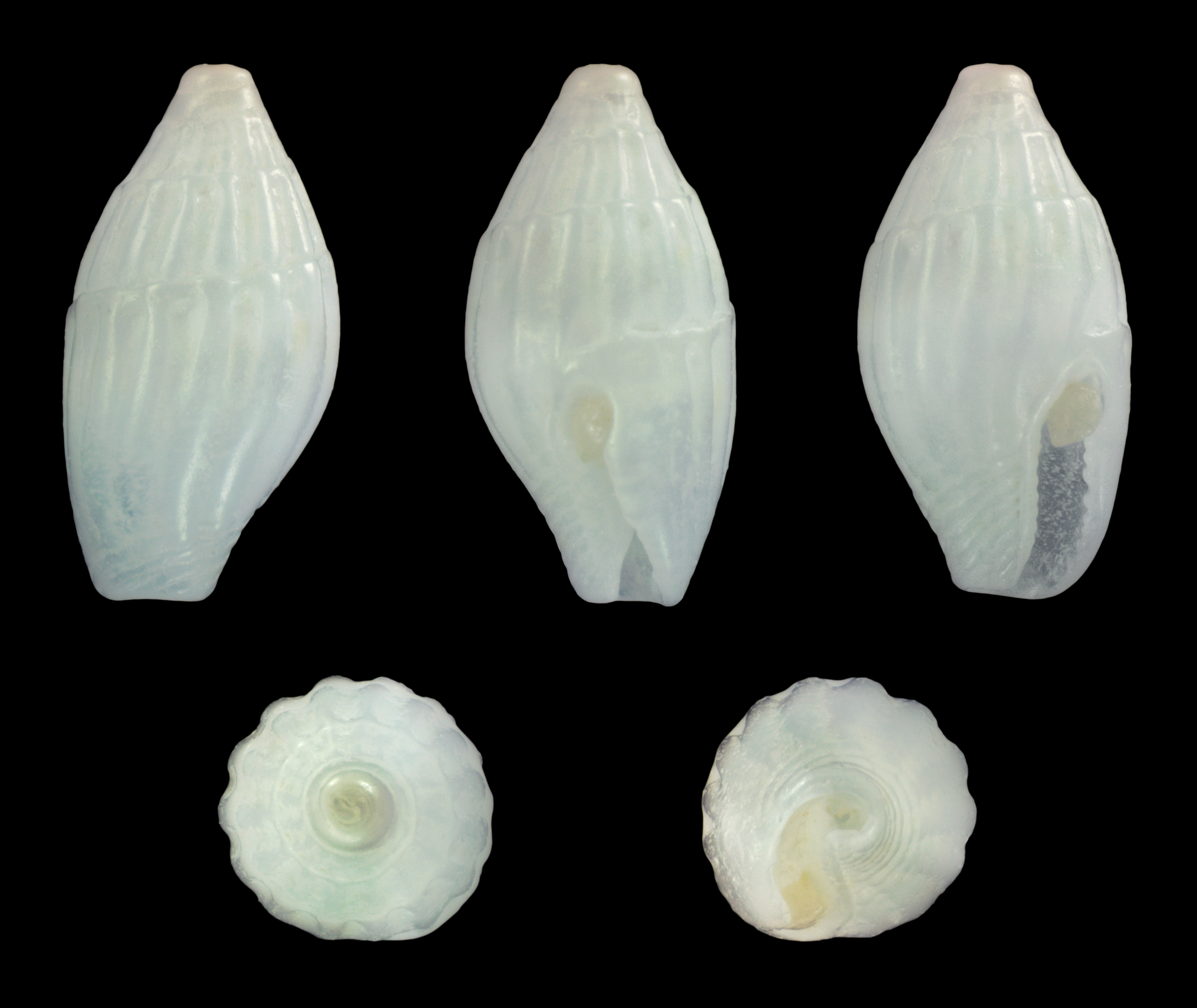
- Shell of Zafra ornata

Scientific classification
- Kingdom: Animalia
- Phylum: Mollusca
- Class: Gastropoda
- Subclass: Caenogastropoda
- Order: Neogastropoda
- Superfamily: Buccinoidea
- Family: Columbellidae
- Genus: Zafra
- Species: Z. ornata

Binomial name
- Zafra ornata (Pease, 1868)

Synonyms
- Citharopsis ornata Pease, 1868 (basionym); Columbella garretti Tryon, 1883; Cytharopsis ornata Pease, 1868 (misspelling of genus); Zafra garretti (W.H. Pease, 1868)

= Zafra ornata =

Species of gastropod

Zafra ornata is a species of sea snail in the family Columbellidae, the dove snails.

== Nomenclature ==
G.W. Tryon established the name Columbella garretti as a replacement name for Citharopsis ornata Pease, 1868, by Tryon treated as a secondary homonym of Columbella ornata Ravenel, 1858. Under Art. 59.3 of the ICZN, "A junior secondary homonym replaced before 1961 is permanently invalid unless the substitute name is not in use and the relevant taxa are no longer considered congeneric, in which case the junior homonym is not to be rejected on grounds of that replacement." In the present case, the name Columbella garretti has not been used as the valid name after Tryon, and Pease and Ravenel's species are not considered to be congeneric. Zafra ornata (Pease, 1868) thus remains the valid name.

== Description ==
The length of the shell attains 2 mm.

(Described as Cytharopsis ornata) The shell is rather stoutly fusiform. The slender spire is elongate. The longitudinal ribs are rounded, prominent, contiguous and sometimes becoming obsolete on lower part of body whorl. The outer lip is denticulate within. The ribs are white, sometimes banded with white, blotched or spotted irregularly with iridescent reddish brown. The body whorl is ornamented with flexuous lines of reddish chestnut.

The shell varies much in the disposition of its colors, but the opaque-white ribs and flexuous lines on the body whorl are constant.

== Distribution ==
This marine species occurs off Tahiti, the Society Islands, the Philippines and South Africa.
