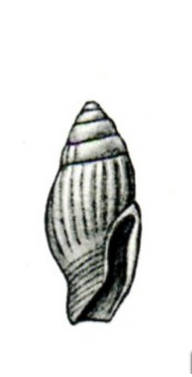
- Shell of Zafra seminulum (holotype)

Scientific classification
- Kingdom: Animalia
- Phylum: Mollusca
- Class: Gastropoda
- Subclass: Caenogastropoda
- Order: Neogastropoda
- Superfamily: Buccinoidea
- Family: Columbellidae
- Genus: Zafra
- Species: Z. seminulum

Binomial name
- Zafra seminulum (Thiele, 1925)

Synonyms
- Columbella seminulum Thiele, 1925 (original combination)

= Zafra seminulum =

Species of gastropod

Zafra seminulum is a species of sea snail in the family Columbellidae, the dove snails.

== Distribution ==
This marine species was found off Western Sumatra.
