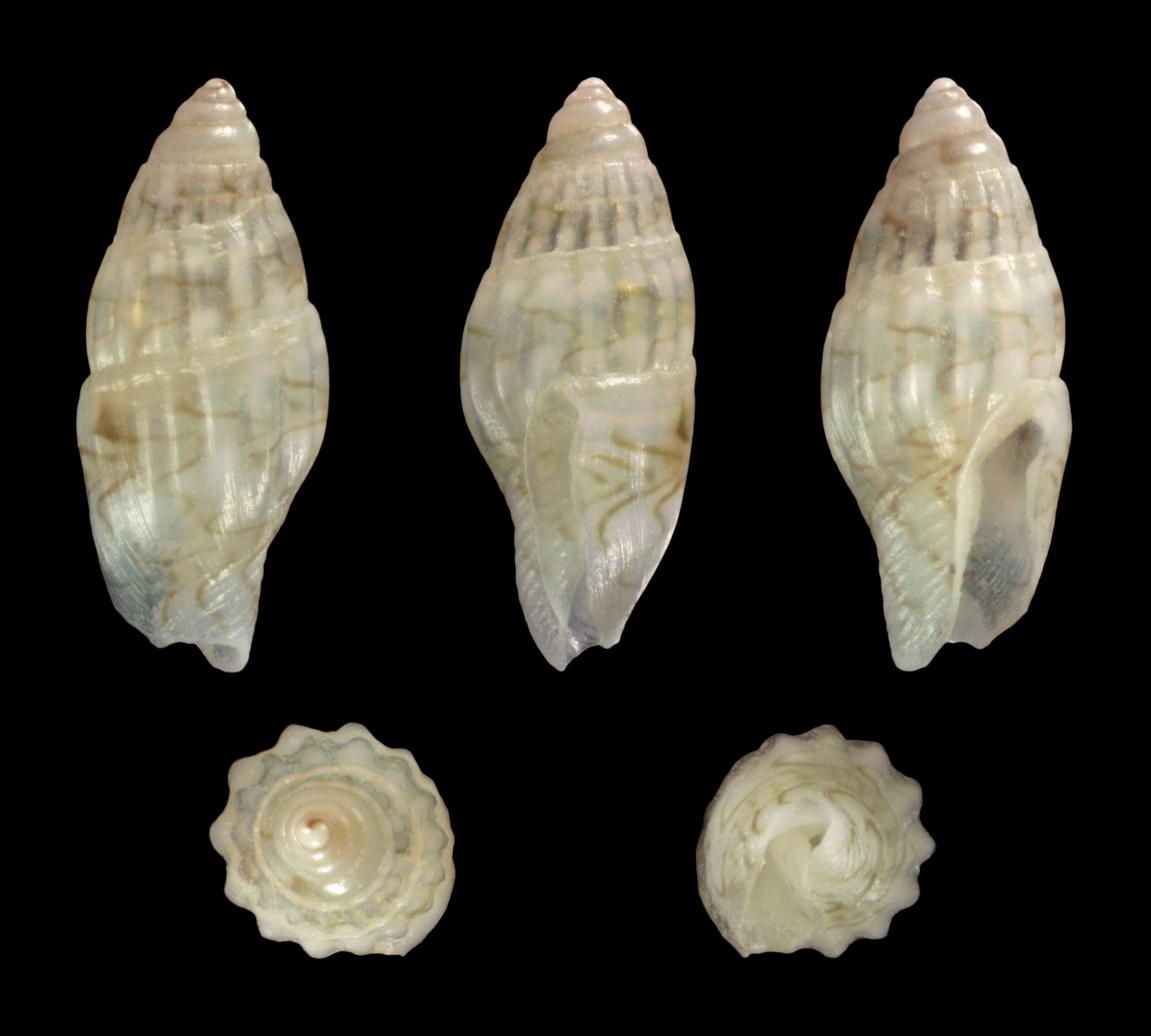
- Shell of Zafra hahajimana

Scientific classification
- Kingdom: Animalia
- Phylum: Mollusca
- Class: Gastropoda
- Subclass: Caenogastropoda
- Order: Neogastropoda
- Superfamily: Buccinoidea
- Family: Columbellidae
- Genus: Zafra
- Species: Z. hahajimana

Binomial name
- Zafra hahajimana (Pilsbry, 1904)

Synonyms
- Columbella hahajimana Pilsbry, 1904 (original combination)

= Zafra hahajimana =

Species of gastropod

Zafra hahajimana is a species of sea snail in the family Columbellidae, the dove snails.

== Description ==
The length of the shell attains 2.8mm, its diameter 1.3mm.

The very minute shell is obesely fusiform and moderately solid. It is yellowish marked with some faint angular brown lines or with white belts at the suture, periphery and base, and marked with angular brown lines, and a row of oblong spots above the middle.

The sculpture consists of many close, small longitudinal folds which do not extend below the periphery. The narrow part of the base is spirally striated. The white aperture is about half the length of the shell. It is narrow and sinuous. The outer lip is toothed within. The columellar lip is very minutely so.

== Distribution ==
This marine species occurs in the Japanese part of the Philippine Sea and in the South Pacific Ocean.
