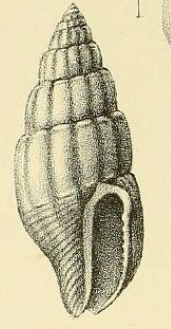
- Shell of Zafra melitoma (holotype)

Scientific classification
- Kingdom: Animalia
- Phylum: Mollusca
- Class: Gastropoda
- Subclass: Caenogastropoda
- Order: Neogastropoda
- Superfamily: Buccinoidea
- Family: Columbellidae
- Genus: Zafra
- Species: Z. melitoma

Binomial name
- Zafra melitoma (Melvill & Standen, 1901)

Synonyms
- Columbella (Seminella) melitoma Melvill & Standen, 1901 superseded combination; Columbella melitoma Melvill & Standen, 1901 superseded combination

= Zafra melitoma =

Species of gastropod

Zafra melitoma is a species of sea snail in the family Columbellidae, the dove snails.

== Description ==
The length of the shell attains 3.25 mm, its diameter 1.5 mm.

This minute, ovate-obese shell is semipellucid. It contains six whorls of which three smooth ones in the protoconch. It is perfectly distinct from all forms of Zafra selasphora and, seemingly, the whorls are more ventricose than in Colombella atomella Duclos, 1840 (synonym of Zafra pumila (Dunker, 1860) ). Zafra melitoma differs in its ventricose whorls, thick ribs, smooth, excepting where crossed by slender lirae towards the base of the body whorl, and golden-yellow colour. The opaque white spiral band just below the sutures is likewise characteristic. The aperture is narrow. The outer lip is incrassate with denticles pointing inwards. The simple columella is almost upright.

== Distribution ==
This marine species occurs off the Pakistan coast.
