= Zafra marisrubris =

Scientific classification
- Kingdom: Animalia
- Phylum: Mollusca
- Class: Gastropoda
- Subclass: Caenogastropoda
- Order: Neogastropoda
- Family: Columbellidae
- Genus: Zafra
- Species: Z. marisrubris

Binomial name
- Zafra marisrubris Neubert, 1998

Species of gastropod

Zafra marisrubris is a species of sea snail in the family Columbellidae, the dove snails.
