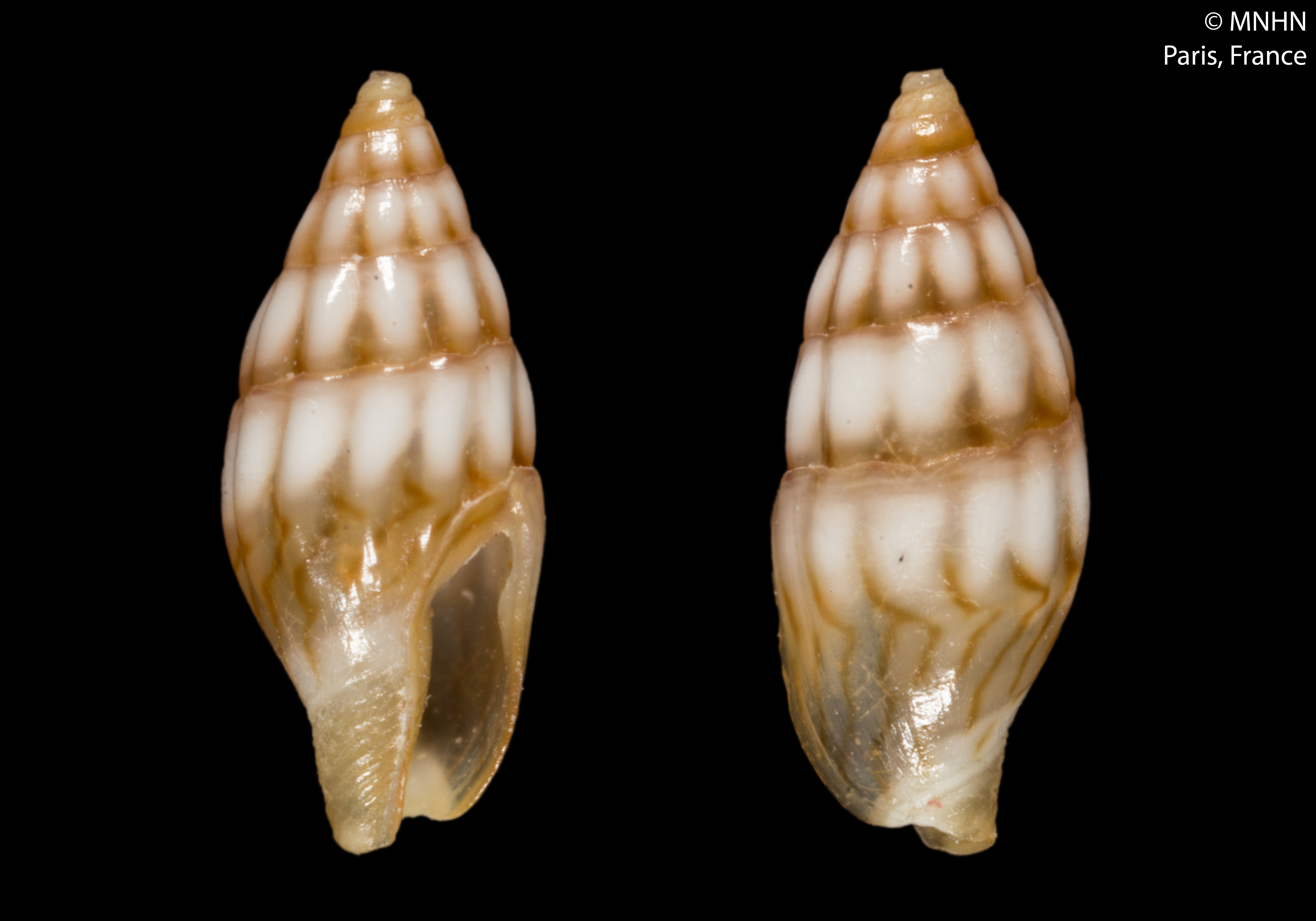
- Shell of Zafra savignyi (syntype at MNHN, Paris)

Scientific classification
- Kingdom: Animalia
- Phylum: Mollusca
- Class: Gastropoda
- Subclass: Caenogastropoda
- Order: Neogastropoda
- Superfamily: Buccinoidea
- Family: Columbellidae
- Genus: Zafra
- Species: Z. savignyi

Binomial name
- Zafra savignyi (Moazzo, 1939)

Synonyms
- Columbella (Seminella) savignyi Moazzo, 1939; Columbella savignyi Moazzo, 1939

= Zafra savignyi =

Species of gastropod

Zafra savignyi is a species of sea snail in the family Columbellidae, the dove snails.

== Description ==
The length of the shell attains 4 mm.

== Distribution ==
The species is found in the Suez Canal, Red Sea and the eastern Mediterranean.
