= Zafra ambonensis =

Scientific classification
- Kingdom: Animalia
- Phylum: Mollusca
- Class: Gastropoda
- Subclass: Caenogastropoda
- Order: Neogastropoda
- Family: Columbellidae
- Genus: Zafra
- Species: Z. ambonensis

Binomial name
- Zafra ambonensis de Maintenon, 2008

Species of gastropod

Zafra ambonensis is a species of sea snail in the family Columbellidae, the dove snails.
