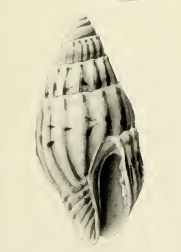
- Shell of Zafra darwini

Scientific classification
- Kingdom: Animalia
- Phylum: Mollusca
- Class: Gastropoda
- Subclass: Caenogastropoda
- Order: Neogastropoda
- Superfamily: Buccinoidea
- Family: Columbellidae
- Genus: Zafra
- Species: Z. darwini

Binomial name
- Zafra darwini (Angas, 1877)

Synonyms
- Columbella darwini Angas, 1877 (original combination); Columbella lentiginosa Reeve, 1859; Zafra almiranta Hedley, 1915

= Zafra darwini =

Species of gastropod

Zafra darwini is a species of sea snail in the family Columbellidae, the dove snails.

== Description ==
The length of the shell attains 3.5 mm, its diameter 1.6 mm.

(Described as Zafra almiranta) The small shell is solid and conical. Its colour is buff with a peripheral and basal row of ferruginous dashes. The shell contains six whorls.

Sculpture : the first two whorls are smooth, the remainder radially ribbed. The ribs are prominent, widely spaced, fifteen on the body whorl, their tops cut off as a bead-row by a subsutural furrow. The base has six, crowded, spiral cords, of which the smaller inner ones are nodulose at the passage of the ribs. The aperture is narrow. There are several denticles within the outer lip.

== Distribution ==
This marine species occurs off Queensland, Australia.
