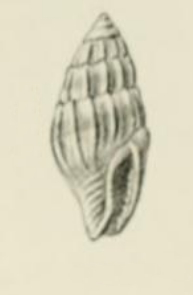
- Shell of Zafra salutaris (holotype)

Scientific classification
- Kingdom: Animalia
- Phylum: Mollusca
- Class: Gastropoda
- Subclass: Caenogastropoda
- Order: Neogastropoda
- Superfamily: Buccinoidea
- Family: Columbellidae
- Genus: Zafra
- Species: Z. salutaris

Binomial name
- Zafra salutaris (Melvill, 1910)

Synonyms
- Columbella (Seminella) salutaris Melvill, 1910 superseded combination; Columbella salutaris Melvill, 1910 ·

= Zafra salutaris =

Species of gastropod

Zafra salutaris is a species of sea snail in the family Columbellidae, the dove snails.

== Description ==
The shell attains a length of 2.75 mm, and a diameter of 1.2 mm.

(Original description in Latin) The short and small shell is fusiform, shiny and smooth. It is white, or straw-zoned. The shell contains six whorls. The apical whorls are small, while the remaining whorls are gradated and deeply impressed at the sutures. They are gently left-ribbed above and thickened below the sutures. The body whorl is left-ribbed, or, as often, the ribs are evanescent, smooth and spirally striated at the base. The aperture is narrowly curved. The inner lip is denticulate, thick, straight in the middle, then curved.The siphonal canal is short.

== Distribution ==
This marine species occurs off Bombay.
