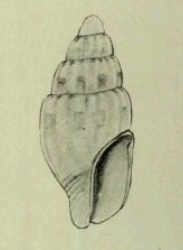
- Shell of Zafra kermadecensis (holotype)

Scientific classification
- Kingdom: Animalia
- Phylum: Mollusca
- Class: Gastropoda
- Subclass: Caenogastropoda
- Order: Neogastropoda
- Family: Columbellidae
- Genus: Zafra
- Species: Z. fuscolineata

Binomial name
- Zafra fuscolineata W. R. B. Oliver, 1915

= Zafra kermadecensis =

Species of gastropod

Zafra kermadecensis is a species of sea snail in the family Columbellidae, the dove snails.

== Description ==
The length of the shell varies between 2 mm to 3 mm; diameter 1 mm.

(Original description) The shell is broadly fusiform. The apex is obtuse. The shell contains 4½ whorls with a flat periphery and shouldered. The suture is deep. The rhomboidal aperture is narrow. The outer and inner lips are parallel, obliquely truncated in front and behind. The outer lip has a broud and shallow sinus at the suture. The inner lip is distinct throughout, narrow and slightly thickened along its straight central and anterior portion. The short siphonal canal is wide.

Sculpture: the smooth protoconch consists of 1 whorl. The adult whorls show low rounded axial plications about 15 on each whorl. The base of the body whorl shows several oblique plications. The surface of the shell is smooth and shiny.

Colour: The protoconch is white.The remainder of the shell is glassy tinged with yellowish. A spiral row of rectangular light yellowish-brown patches on the spire-whorls, one on each alternate plication, and extending from above the periphery to the lower suture. This row is continued on the periphery of the body whorl. Below it is a clear spiral band, the base being more or less coloured with the same yellowish-brown The tip of the siphonal canal is clear.

== Distribution ==
This marine species occurs off the Kermadec Islands, New Zealand
