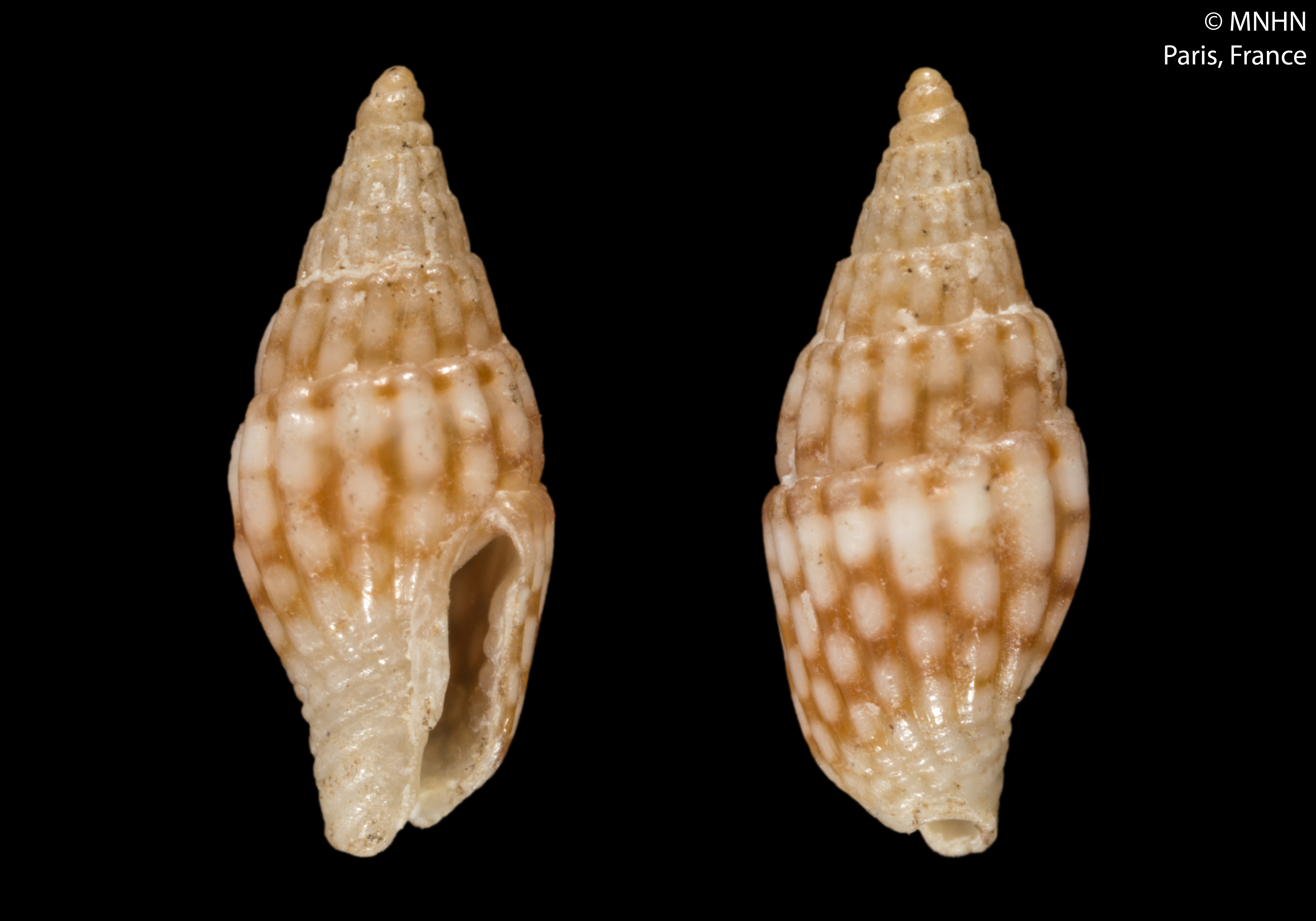
- Shell of Zafra ocellatula (syntype at MNHN, Paris)

Scientific classification
- Kingdom: Animalia
- Phylum: Mollusca
- Class: Gastropoda
- Subclass: Caenogastropoda
- Order: Neogastropoda
- Superfamily: Buccinoidea
- Family: Columbellidae
- Genus: Zafra
- Species: Z. ocellatula

Binomial name
- Zafra ocellatula (Hervier, 1900)

Synonyms
- Columbella ocellatula Hervier, 1900 (original combination); Columbella oselmonta var. minima Hervier, 1900 ·

= Zafra ocellatula =

Species of gastropod

Zafra ocellatula is a species of sea snail in the family Columbellidae, the dove snails.

== Description ==
The length of the shell attains 5.3 mm.

== Distribution ==
This marine species occurs off Lifou Island, Loyalty Islands and the Philippines.
