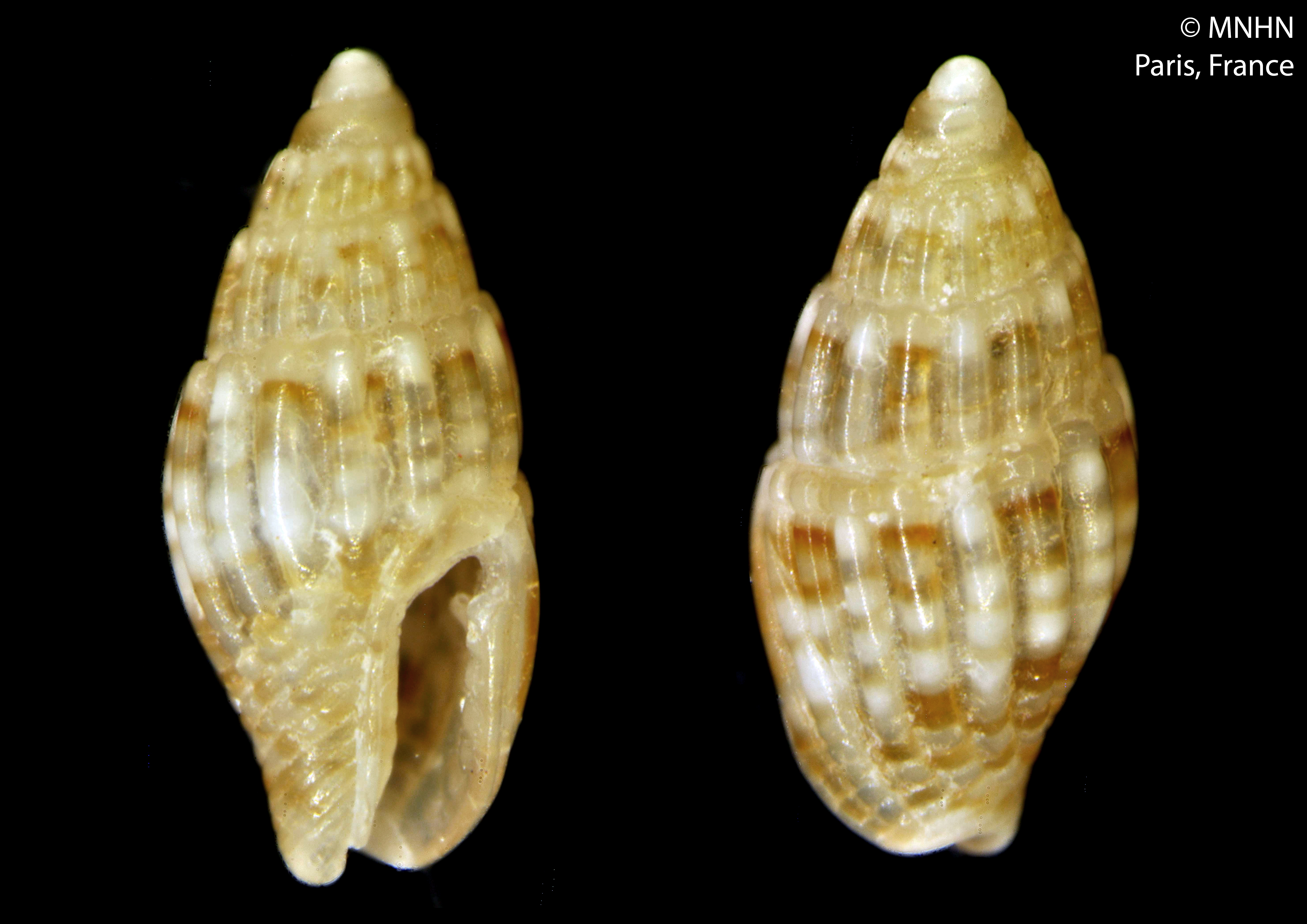
- Shell of Zafra vercoi (specimen at MNHN, Paris)

Scientific classification
- Kingdom: Animalia
- Phylum: Mollusca
- Class: Gastropoda
- Subclass: Caenogastropoda
- Order: Neogastropoda
- Superfamily: Buccinoidea
- Family: Columbellidae
- Genus: Zafra
- Species: Z. vercoi

Binomial name
- Zafra vercoi (Thiele, 1930)

Synonyms
- Pyrene (Zafra) vercoi Thiele, 1930 (original combination)

= Zafra vercoi =

Species of gastropod

Zafra vercoi is a species of sea snail in the family Columbellidae, the dove snails.

== Distribution ==
This marine species is endemic to Australia and occurs off Western Australia; also off the Marquesas Islands.
