= Zafra farasanensis =

Scientific classification
- Kingdom: Animalia
- Phylum: Mollusca
- Class: Gastropoda
- Subclass: Caenogastropoda
- Order: Neogastropoda
- Family: Columbellidae
- Genus: Zafra
- Species: Z. farasanensis

Binomial name
- Zafra farasanensis Neubert, 1998

Species of gastropod

Zafra farasanensis is a species of sea snail in the family Columbellidae, the dove snails.

== Distribution ==
This marine species occurs in the Red Sea
