= Zafra mitriformis =

Scientific classification
- Kingdom: Animalia
- Phylum: Mollusca
- Class: Gastropoda
- Subclass: Caenogastropoda
- Order: Neogastropoda
- Superfamily: Buccinoidea
- Family: Columbellidae
- Genus: Zafra
- Species: Z. mitriformis

Binomial name
- Zafra mitriformis A. Adams, 1860

Synonyms
- Anachis zonata A. Adams, 1860; Columbella (Anachis) zonata A. Gould, 1860 (superseded combination); Columbella zonata A. Gould, 1860 (junior subjective synonym); Mangelia yuraensis Nomura & Zinbo, 1940; Zafra validicosta Habe, 1960; Zafra yuraensis A. Adams, 1860

Species of gastropod

Zafra mitriformis is a species of sea snail in the family Columbellidae, the dove snails.

== Description ==
The length of the shell attains 3 mm, its diameter is 2 mm.

(Original description in Latin) The shell is mitriform, thickened in the middle, and white, with a dark brown band along the sutures. The body whorl is tinged with red at the base and is encircled at the periphery by a narrow red transverse line. The shell has 6.5 whorls, which are rather flat and longitudinally plicate. The plications are strong, oblique, and somewhat distant from one another. The body whorl is constricted anteriorly and obliquely sulcate.

== Distribution ==
This marine species occurs in the Sea of Japan.
