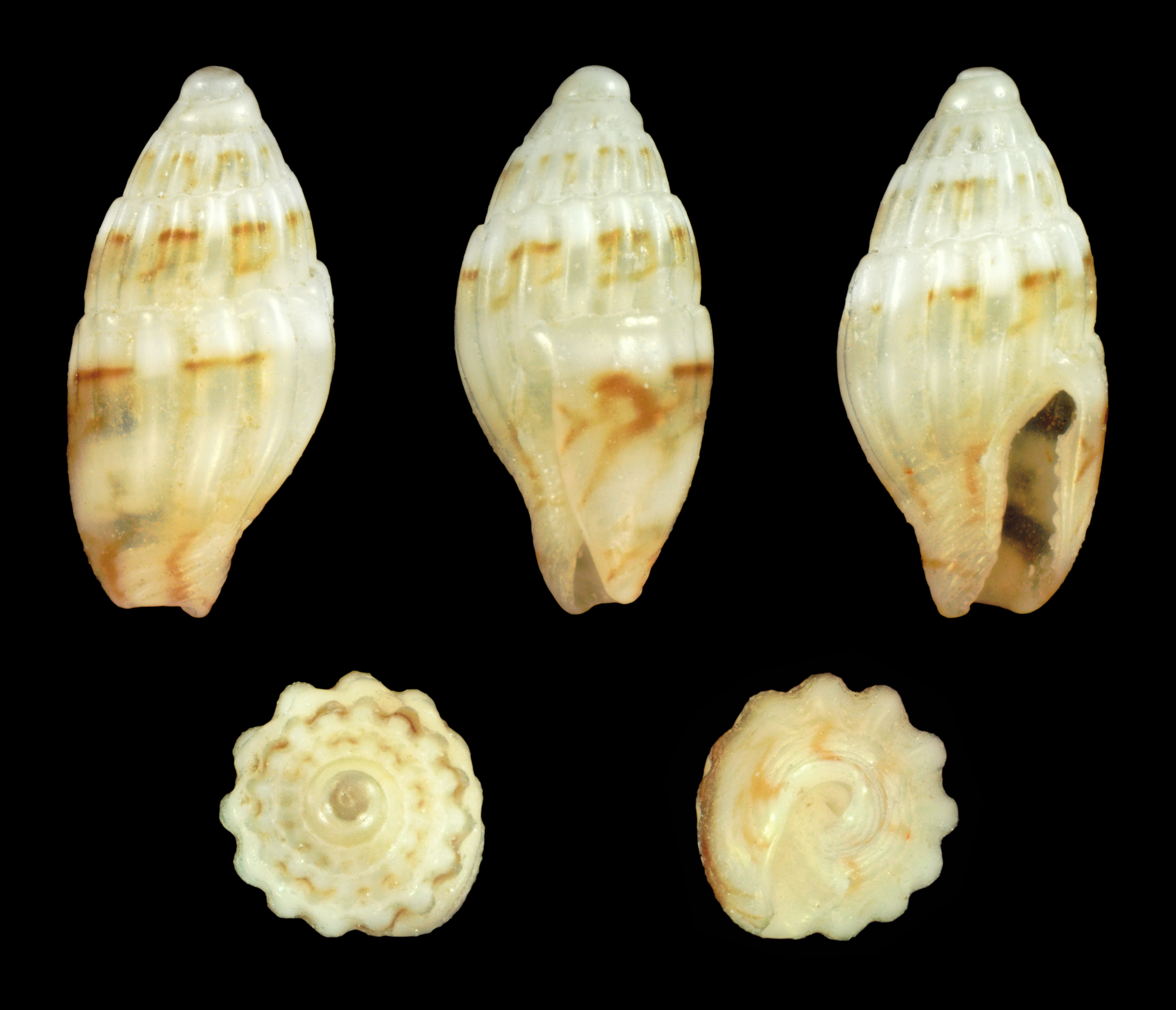
- Shell of Zafra troglodytes

Scientific classification
- Kingdom: Animalia
- Phylum: Mollusca
- Class: Gastropoda
- Subclass: Caenogastropoda
- Order: Neogastropoda
- Family: Columbellidae
- Genus: Zafra
- Species: Z. troglodytes

Binomial name
- Zafra troglodytes (Souverbie in Souverbie & Montrouzier, 1866)

Synonyms
- Columbella garretti Tryon, 1883; Columbella troglodytes Souverbie in Souverbie & Montrouzier, 1866; Columbella troglodytes Souverbie, 1866 (basionym); Columbella troglodytes var. fulvastra Hervier, 1899; Columbella troglodytes var. sinensis G.B. Sowerby, 1894; Anachis sinensis Sowerby, G.B. III, 1894

= Zafra troglodytes =

Species of gastropod

Zafra troglodytes is a species of sea snail in the family Columbellidae, the dove snails.

== Description ==
Shell size varies between 2 mm and 6 mm.

This species is more biconical in shape than Zafra succinea, with a carinated protoconch, and a different colour pattern.

== Distribution ==
This species occurs in the Red Sea, Aden and Djibouti; and in the Indian Ocean off Madagascar and in the Western Pacific Ocean.
