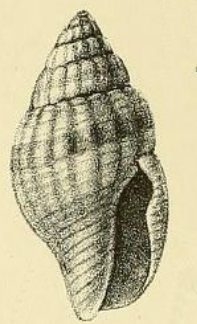
- Shell of Zafra selasphora (holotype)

Scientific classification
- Kingdom: Animalia
- Phylum: Mollusca
- Class: Gastropoda
- Subclass: Caenogastropoda
- Order: Neogastropoda
- Family: Columbellidae
- Genus: Zafra
- Species: Z. selasphora

Binomial name
- Zafra selasphora (Melvill & Standen, 1901)

Synonyms
- Anachis troglodytes (Souverbie in Souverbie & Montrouzier, 1866); Columbella selasphora Melvill & Standen, 1901 (basionym); Pyrene selasphora (Melvill & Standen, 1901)

= Zafra selasphora =

Species of gastropod

Zafra selasphora is a species of sea snail in the family Columbellidae, the dove snails.

== Description ==
The shell grows to a length of 3.5 mm, its diameter 1.5 mm.

This minute, ovate species contains 6-7 whorls. It is principally conspicuous for its smooth longitudinal ribs, with no revolving lines, the ribs themselves being often obsolete on the body whorl, wholly or, at all events, in part. The beautiful zigzag painting, like lightning-flashes, is also characteristic. The oblong aperture is narrow. The outer lip is slightly incrassate with few denticles inside.The simple columella is shining.

== Distribution ==
This species is distributed in the Mediterranean Sea, the Red Sea, the Persian Gulf and in the Indian Ocean along the Aldabra Atoll
