= List of cities in New Caledonia =

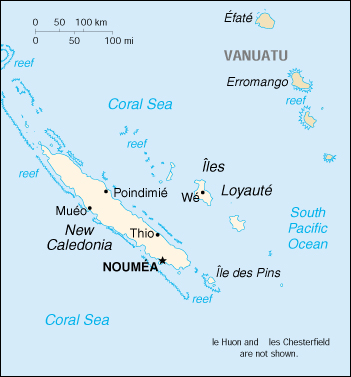
Map of New Caledonia

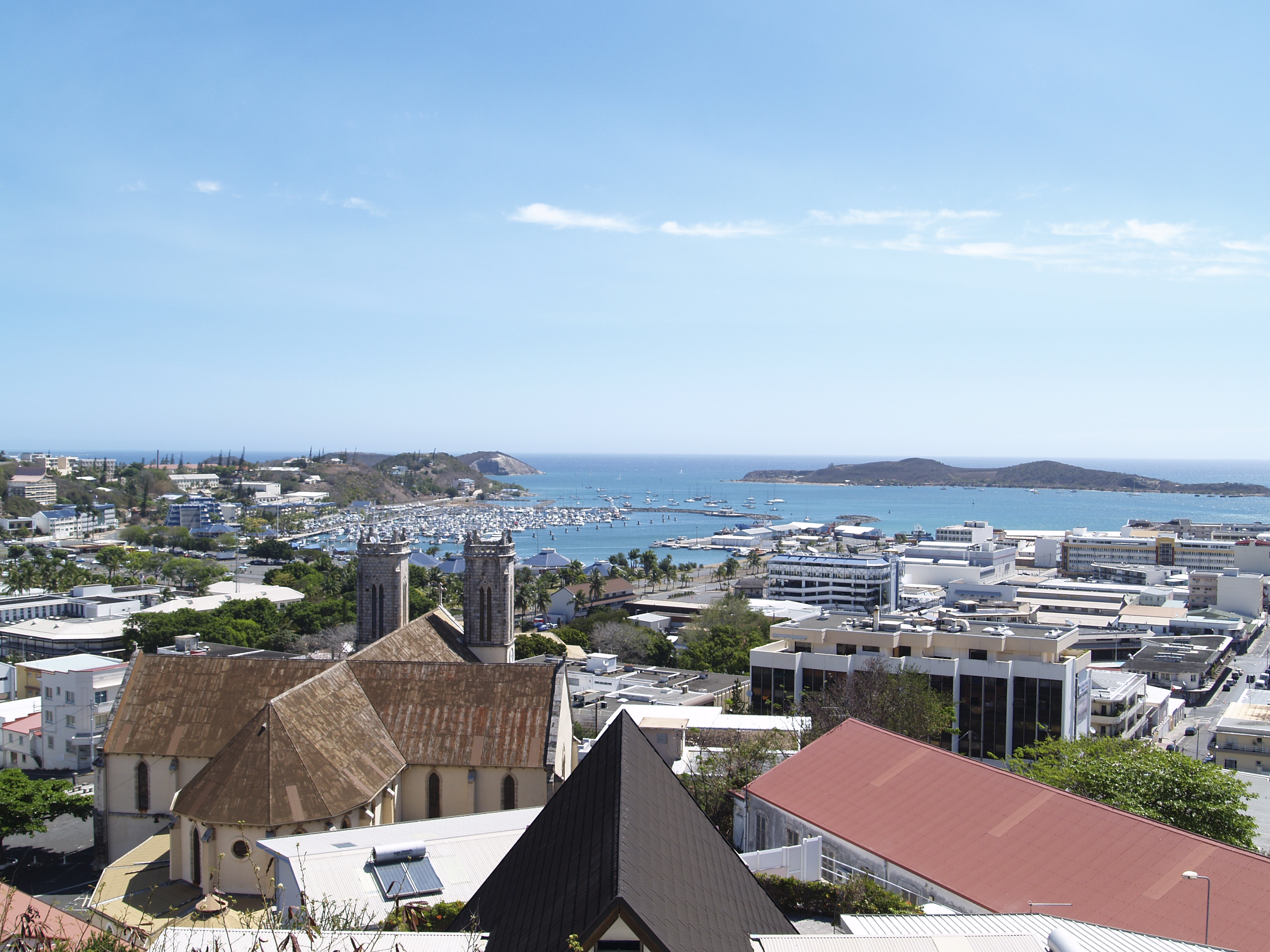
Nouméa, capital of New Caledonia

This article shows a list of cities, towns and villages in New Caledonia.

== Major cities and towns ==
Provincial capitals are shown in bold.

N°	City	Population	Province
1	**Nouméa**	101,476	South
2	Le Mont-Dore	25,683	South
3	Dumbéa	24,103	South
4	Païta	16,358	South
5	**Lifou**	8,627	Loyalty Islands
6	Maré	5,417	Loyalty Islands
7	**Koné**	5,199	North
8	Bourail	4,999	South
9	Poindimié	4,818	North
10	Houaïlou	3,945	North

== Hamlets (Lieux-dits) ==
The villages or hamlets (French: lieux-dits) of New Caledonia are ordered by municipality (commune) and province. Municipal seats (chef-lieu) are shown in the list.

=== South Province ===
- **Boulouparis**
1. Boulouparis (chef-lieu)
2. Bouraké
3. Gilles
4. Kouerga
5. Nassirah
6. Nétéa
7. Ouaméni
8. Ouinané
9. Ouitchambo
10. Tomo
- **Bourail**
1. Azareu
2. Bouirou
3. Gouaro
4. Nandaï
5. Néméara
6. Nessadiou
7. Ny
8. Oua-Oué
9. Potê
- **Dumbéa**
1. Dumbéa (chef-lieu)
2. Koutio
3. Nondoué
4. Yahoué
- **Farino**
1. Farino (chef-lieu)
2. Fonwhary
- **Isle of Pines**
1. Comagna
2. Gadji
3. Kotomo
4. Ouatchia
5. Touete
6. Vao
7. Wapan
8. Wapwangâ
9. Youati
- **La Foa**
1. La Foa (chef-lieu)
2. Coindé
3. Forêt Noire
4. Oua-Tom
5. Oui-Poin
6. Pocquereux Kouma
- **Moindou**
1. Mouidou (chef-lieu)
2. Kéré
3. Moméa
4. Téremba
- **Le Mont-Dore**
1. Le Mont-Dore (chef-lieu)
2. La Capture
3. La Conception
4. La Coulée
5. Ouara
6. Plum
7. Prony
8. Saint-Louis
- **Nouméa**
1. Nouméa (capital and largest city)
- **Païta**
1. Païta (chef-lieu)
2. Bangou
3. Col de la pirogue
4. Katiranoma
5. Kokoréta
6. Makou
7. Naniouni
8. N'dé
9. Onghoué
10. Plaine-Aux-Cailloux
11. Port Laguerre
12. Sanatorium
13. Saint-Laurent
14. Tamoa
15. Timbia
16. Tongouin
17. Tontouta
- **Sarraméa**
1. Sarraméa (chef-lieu)
2. Petit Couli
3. Grand Couli
- **Thio**
1. Thio (chef-lieu)
2. Grand Borendy
3. Petit Borendy
4. Ouindo
5. Les Pétroglyphes
6. Saint-Jean-Baptiste
7. Saint-Joseph
8. Saint-Michel
9. Saint-Paul
10. Saint-Pierre
11. Saint-Roch
12. Saint-Philippo 1
13. Saint-Philippo 2
- **Yaté**
1. Yaté (chef-lieu)
2. Goro
3. Touaourou
4. Unia
5. Waho

=== North Province ===
- **Belep**
1. Waala
- **Canala**
1. Nakéty
2. Emma
3. Haouli
4. Koh
5. Négropo
6. Ouassé
- **Hienghène**
1. Hienghène (chef-lieu)
- **Houaïlou**
1. Houaïlou (chef-lieu)
- **Kaala-Gomen**
1. Kaala-Gomen (chef-lieu)
2. Tiebaghi
- **Koné**
1. Koné (chef-lieu)
- **Kouaoua**
1. Kouaoua (chef-lieu)
2. Kanoé-Chaoué
3. Méa-Mébara
4. Wabe
5. Wénèè
- **Koumac**
1. Koumac (chef-lieu)
- **Ouégoa**
1. Ouégoa (chef-lieu)
- **Poindimié**
1. Poindimié (chef-lieu)
- **Ponérihouen**
1. Ponérihouen (chef-lieu)
- **Pouébo**
1. Pouébo (chef-lieu)
- **Pouembout**
1. Pouembout (chef-lieu)
- **Poum**
1. Poum (chef-lieu)
- **Poya**
1. Poya (chef-lieu)
2. Muéo
3. Napoua
- **Touho**
1. Touho (chef-lieu)
- **Voh**
1. Voh (chef-lieu)

=== Loyalty Islands Province ===
- **Ouvéa**
1. Fayaoué
2. Mouli
3. Imone
4. Saint Joseph
5. Takedji
- **Lifou**
1. Gaica
2. Lösi
3. Wetr
4. Wé
- **Maré**
1. Eni
2. Guahma
3. Medu
4. Pénélo
5. Hnawayaca
6. Kaewatine
7. Menaku
8. Padawa
9. La Roche
10. Roh
11. Tadine
12. Tawainèdre
13. Tenane
14. Thogone
15. Wabao
16. Wakuarori

== See also ==
- Communes of New Caledonia
- French overseas departments and territories
- Administrative divisions of France
- Islands controlled by France in the Indian and Pacific oceans
