= List of islands of New Caledonia =

This is a list of islands of New Caledonia.

== Information ==
The French territory of New Caledonia comprises four archipelagos. The following is a breakdown of the islands of the country.

== Table of islands ==
Island	Capital	Other cities	Area (km^{2})	Population
New Caledonia	Nouméa	Koné, Lifou, Mont Dore, Dumbea, Païta, Wé, Tadine, Poindimié, Bourail, Houaïlou	18,780	257,000
:::Archipelago of New Caledonia	Nouméa	Koné, Mont Dore, Dumbea, Poindimié, Païta, Bourail, Houaïlou	16,807.6	238,755
Belep Islands	Waala		66.04	930
Art Island	Waala	Aue, New Caledonia, Ono, Weaa, Bweo, Pairome, Tenane, Aawe	51.6	930
Dau Ac	Dau du Nord	Dau du Sud	2.01	0
Other			0	0
Pott island	Panane	Mouane, Penisi	12.4	0
Recif de Cook	Ongombua	Sable	0.03	0
Bouloupari Islands	Puen	Parseval, Ducos, Lepredour, Hugon	37.6	150
Daussey	Daussey		0.375	0
Ducos	Ducos	Pointe Buffalo, Pointe Jacqueline, baie aux moustiques	12.47	10
Geoffroy			0.34	0
Hugon	Hugon	Pointe Guillois	7.71	5
Layrle	Layrle		0.26	0
Lepredour	Anse Bourake		7.7	5
Other	Deravenne	St. Phalle, Gaua	0.775	8
Parseval	Parseval		3.28	20
Petit Tenia	Petit Tenia		0.07	0
Puen	Puen Caldoche	Pointe Moziman, plage de sable, Point Aux Huitres, Plage aux cailloux, caravanes	3.11	100
Tenia	Tenia	Plage Ouest, pointe nord	0.25	0
Testard	Testard	Cafard	1.05	2
Verte	Verte		0.21	0
Dumbea Islands	Ans aux Chevres		0.75	5
Ile aux Chevres	Ans aux Chevres		0.56	5
Other	Freycinet	Noure	0.19	0
Grand Terre	Nouméa	Koné, Mont Dore, Dumbea, Poindimie, Païta, Bourail, Houaïlou	16,372	235,303
Hienghene Islands	Hienghene		0.9	0
Hienga Island			0.11	0
Hiengabat Island			0.19	0
Hienghene Island	Anse Hienghene		0.24	0
Hiengou Island			0.07	0
La Poule			0.04	0
Other			0	0
Tiguit Island			0.06	0
Vao Island	Vao		0.19	0
Houailou Islands	Neni Island		0.03	0
Neni Island			0.02	0
Other			0	0
Toverou Island			0.01	0
Koné Islands	Koniene Island		0.79	0
Koniene Island			0.78	0
Other			0	0
Pingiane island			0.01	0
Koumac Islands	Devert	Kendec	0.31	2
Devert Island	Devert		0.04	2
Kendec Island	Ans Kendec		0.02	0
Other			0.25	0
L'Île-des-Pins	Vao	Kuto	160.8	2,060
Adventure Island			0.07	0
Ami Island	kiki et jeannine		0.33	2
Ana Island			0.21	0
Bayonnaise Island	Bayonnaise		0.2	0
Brosse Island	Brosse		0.68	0
Caanawa island			0.11	0
Gerenore Island			0.1	0
Gie Island			0.07	0
Isle of Pines (New Caledonia)	Vao	Ouro, Kuto, Kanumera, Camagna, Koeville, Gadji	141.7	2,055
Kôtomo Island	Baie de Mo	Pointe Ita, Baie Gu, Baie Maurice, St. Joseph	13	3
Kuumo island	Kuumo	Nouma	0.4	0
Menore island			0.23	0
Moro Island			0.11	0
Na Na Island	Na Na		0.2	0
Nokanui Island	Nokanui		0.02	0
Nuu powa Island			0.11	0
Other	Kunubutr	Koe, Oento, duami, duana, Kuibandui, Atere, Mwarayere, Ouage, Lorette Island, Kwa Wiiyere Island, Rewiere island	1.14	0
Tore Island	Tore		0.47	0
Walpole Island (New Caledonia)	Walpole		1.65	0
La Foa Islands	Isie	Lebris	2.66	0
Isie island	Anse Isie Nord	Anse Isie Sud	0.4	0
Koduo Island	Koduo		0.04	0
Lebris island	Ans Lebris		2.21	0
Other	Ouano		0.01	0
Le Mont-Dore Islands	Ouara	Casy	39.4	110
Bailly island	Bailly		0.41	0
Casy Island	Casy	Pointe de l'Abattoir	0.39	10
Ile Charron			0.08	0
Ile Porc-Epic			0.02	0
Montravel island	Montravel	Montravel Sud	0.3	0
Nde island	Charbon		0.19	0
Other	Redika	Tareti, Atire, Tioae, Uo	0.27	0
Ouen Island	Ouara	Baie des tortues, Ndji, Kouo, Ouenni	37.7	100
Ugo Island	Ugo		0.04	0
Moindou Islands	Kondugi		4.24	2
Kundogi Islands	Kundogi	Teremba	0.18	2
Mara Island			3.95	0
Other			0	0
Verte Island			0.11	0
North coast group	Taanlo	Yenghebane, Yande	96.4	150
Baaba island	Baaba	Tiae	27.22	15
Balabio island	Point Marard	baie du capitaine	32.53	5
Boh Islands	Boh	Maabounghi, Ans Tanale, Ouan	4.45	10
Ilot Mouac	Anse Divine		1.16	0
Neba island	Anse Neba		3.82	0
Other	Tanle	Phwajep, Tie, New Caledonia, taabam, Banare baie	4.94	0
Pam Island	Anse Pam		5.96	0
Pia Island	Tia		0.46	0
Taanlo Island	Taanlo		0.89	40
Yande island	Yande	Maintagava, Bouaka	13.42	40
Yenghebane Island	Yenghebane		1.55	40
Nouméa Islands	Maitre		1.63	40
Amedee	Amedee lighthouse		0.07	4
Fourni islands	Grand ile	Petite ile	0.08	0
Ile aux Canards	Ile aux Canards		0.01	0
Maitre Island	L'Escapade Island Resort		0.08	30
Other	Goeland		0.01	0
Sainte-Marie Island	Ngea	Anse Antennas	1.2	1
Uere island	Uere		0.18	5
Other			0.01	0
Païta Islands	Mathieu	Signal	4.8	3
Abu island			0.25	0
Ange Island	Tangue		0.06	0
Goldfield island	Mboa		0.05	0
Longue Island			0.24	0
Mathieu island	Mathieu	Cap Ka	1.7	3
Mba Island	Mba		0.36	0
Mbe island			0.05	0
Mbo Island			0.18	0
Moro Island			0.1	0
Ndukue island	Ndukue	Pointe Caouritta	0.34	0
Other	Mbekuen	Laregnere	0.03	0
Page Island			0.69	0
Ronde Islands	Ronde	Ndue, Pandanus	0.11	0
Signal Island	Signal Park		0.14	0
To Ndu Island			0.5	0
Poindimié Islands	Tibarama		0.04	0
Ponerihouen Islands	Ague Island	Karu Island	0.05	0
Poya Islands	Didot	Grimault	5.02	0
Didot Island	Didot		0.2	0
Grimault island	Ans Nepoui		4.3	0
Hiye Island			0.51	0
Other	Contrariete		0.01	0
Recifs d'Entrecasteaux			3.3	0
Atoll de Huon	Houn Island		0.5	0
Atoll de la Surprise	Surprise	Fabre, Le Leizour	2.7	0
Atoll du Portail			0	0
Atoll Pelotas	Sable		0.03	0
Other	recif du Merite	recif Guilbert	0.07	0
South coast group	Mato Island	Gi Island	1.05	0
Gi Island			0.1	0
Kouare Island			0.07	0
Leroue Island			0.07	0
Mato Island	Mato		0.05	0
Nda Island			0.06	0
Ndo Island			0.08	0
Nge Island			0.07	0
Noe Island			0.05	0
Other	Tere	kako, Uie, Totea	0.114	0
Puemba Island			0.08	0
Ua Island			0.07	0
Uaterembi Island			0.09	0
Uatio Island			0.07	0
Uua Island	Uua		0.076	0
Thio Islands	Tupeti Island	Nani Island	7	0
Muru island			0	0
Nani Island			0.53	0
Nemu Island			1.2	0
Other	Kinde	Nileouti, Guoh	0.05	0
Tupeti Island			5.22	0
Touho Islands	Ain Island	Ouao Island	0.32	0
Yaté Islands	Neaa Island	Nuu Island	2.46	0
Amere Island			0.08	0
Kie island			0.1	0
Mamere Islands			0.04	0
Ndie island			0.03	0
Neaa Island			1.25	0
Nie Island			0	0
Nouare Island			0.06	0
Nuu Island			0.84	0
Other	Rocher Letendi	Noutie	0.06	0
:::Chesterfield Islands	Longue	Mouillage, Bampton	2.17	0
Chesterfield Atoll	Longue	Bennet, Passage, Loop, Mouillage, Sable	1.5	0
Lansdowne Bank	Nereus Reef	Fairway Reef	0	0
Other			0	0
recifs Bampton	Bampton	Avon, Reynard, Sableuse de Skeleton	0.44	0
Recifs de Bellone	Booby reef	Caye de l'observatoire	0.23	0
Sandy Island, New Caledonia			0	0
:::Loyalty Islands	Wé	Tadine, Wadrilla	1,968.2	18,245
Lifou	Wé	Luecila, Hnathalo, Xepenehe, Drueulu, Mou, Toka	1,160.5	9,028
Leliogat island			0.7	0
Lifou Island	Wé	Luecila, Hnathalo, Xepenehe, Drueulu, Mou	1,146	8,881
Other			0	0
Oua Island			0.9	0
Recif Jouan			0.05	0
Tiga Island	Toka	Ouen	11	147
Vauvilliers Island	Anse Nie		1.85	0
Maré	Tadine	La Roche, Wabao	659.5	5,667
Dudun Island	Dudun		2.45	0
Maré Island	Tadine	La Roche, Wabao	657	5,667
Other			0.05	0
Other			0	0
Ouvéa	Fayaoue	Wadrilla, Mouli, St. Joseph	148.2	3,550
Faiava Island	Faiava		0.67	42
Ile Beautemps-Beaupre	Beautemps-Beaupre		0.45	0
Mouli Island	Mouli	nihap, Tonga, Hwakaio, badeni	7.04	364
Ognat Island			0.26	0
Other	Degouala	Guetie, Longe, Anemata, Table, Pleiades du Nord, Pleiades du Sud, wenyooc	3.98	0
Ouvéa Island	Fayaoue	Saint Joseph, Takedji, Wadrilla	132	3,140
Recif Petrie			0	0
Recifs de l'Astrolabe			0	0
Unyee Island	Moulifenoua		3.8	4
:::Matthew and Hunter Islands	Matthew Island	Hunter Island	1.3	0
Hunter Island	Hunter		0.6	0
Matthew Island	east beach	west beach	0.7	0
Other			0	0
:::Other			0.73	0
:::New Caledonia	Nouméa	Koné, Lifou, Mont Dore, Dumbea, Paita, Wé, Tadine, Poindimie, Bourail, Houailou	18,780	257,000

== See also ==
- Geography of New Caledonia
