= Hnawayaca =

- Village
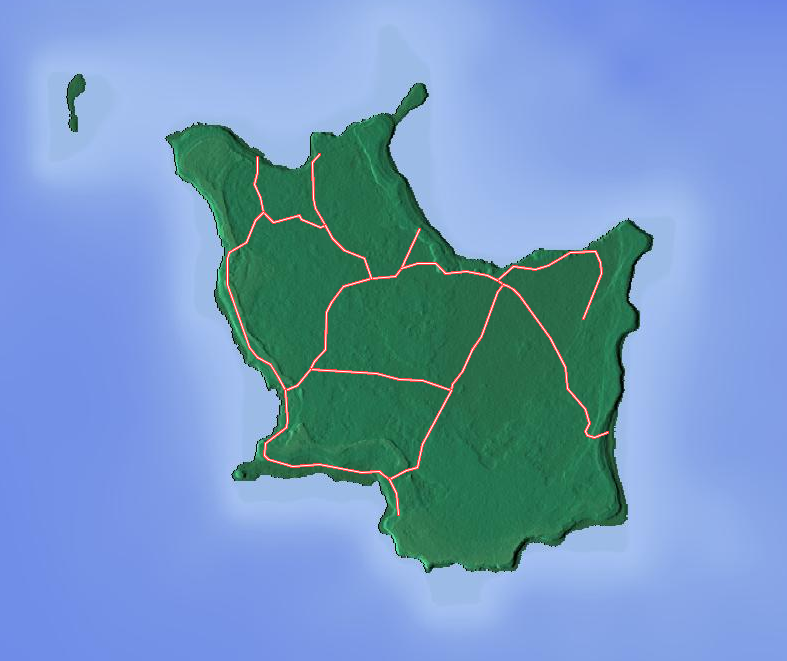
- Location in Maré Island
- Coordinates: 21°26′18″S 167°51′46″E
- Territory: New Caledonia, France
- Province: Loyalty Islands Province
- Commune: Maré
- Time zone: UTC+11

Hnawayaca is a village in northwestern Maré Island, in the Loyalty Islands of New Caledonia. It lies west by road from Wakuarori, northeast of Padawa and south of Roh. The villagers are notable performers of the Drui dance.
