= Wakuarori =

- Village
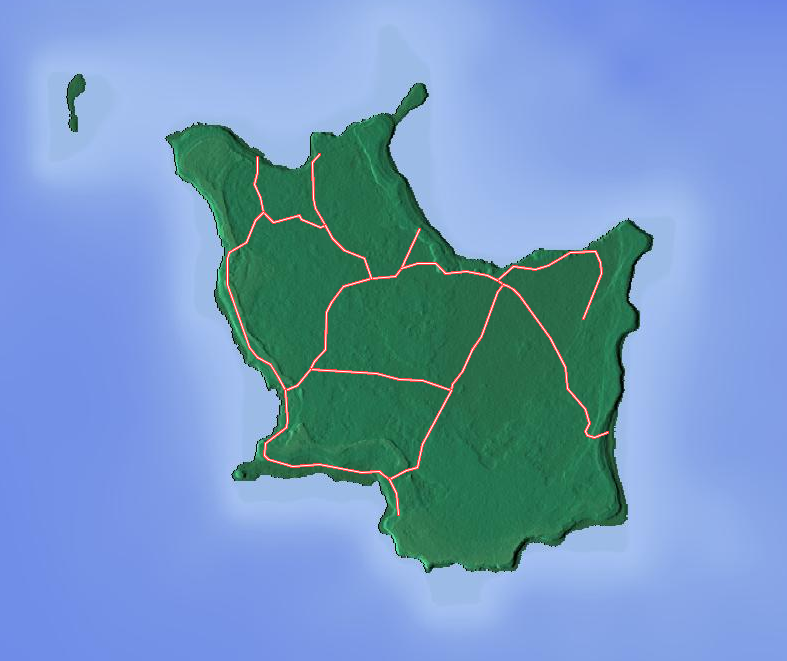
- Location in Maré Island Wakuarori (New Caledonia)
- Coordinates: 21°26′5″S 167°53′54″E
- Territory: New Caledonia, France
- Province: Loyalty Islands Province
- Commune: Maré
- Time zone: UTC+11

Wakuarori is a village in northern-central Maré Island, in the Loyalty Islands of New Caledonia. It lies south by road from Tenane and east of Hnawayaca.
