= UUA (disambiguation) =

UUA or Unitarian Universalist Association is a liberal religious association of Unitarian Universalist congregations.

UUA or Uua may also refer to:

- Bugulma Airport's IATA code
- Ua (singer) or Uua, Japanese singer
- UUA, a pilot report code for an "urgent" message
- UUA, a codon for leucine
- United Utilities Australia or TRILITY, an Australian water utility, acquired by INCJ and others
- Uua Island, an island of New Caledonia
