= Paul Néaoutyine =

New Caledonian politician (born 1951)

President of the Provincial Assembly of North Province
- Incumbent
- Assumed office June 14, 1999
- Preceded by: Léopold Jorédié

Mayor of Poindimié
- Incumbent
- Assumed office March 24, 1989
- Preceded by: Francis Poadouy

Personal details
- Born: Paul Néaoutyine; 12 October 1951 (age 74) Poindimié, New Caledonia
- Party: Party of Kanak Liberation

Paul Néaoutyine (French pronunciation: [pɔl neautin]; born October 12, 1951, in Poindimié) is a French New Caledonian politician. A Kanak of the Saint-Michel tribe, he has been president of the North Province of New Caledonia since 1999. He is a supporter of New Caledonian independence.

== Training and professional career ==
After schooling in private Catholic education, he left to study in France at the Université Lumière in Lyon, from which he graduated and then did a DEA in economics in 1977. Back in New Caledonia, he went to teach as assistant teacher at the Lapérouse public high school in Nouméa from 1979 to 1980 and from 1983 to 1985.

== Legal Affairs ==
=== Driving while intoxicated ===
Paul Néaoutyine was involved in a car accident in the town of Poya on Tuesday April 25, 2023 between 2 a.m. and 3 a.m. A gendarme patrol spotted his vehicle embedded in the fence of a property in the Moindah sector.1

Paul Néaoutyine's blood alcohol test was positive, with a concentration of 1.6 grams of alcohol in the blood. He could then be prosecuted for lack of control and driving under the influence of an alcoholic state.

=== Domestic violence ===
In 2008, Paul Néaoutyine was given a 2-month suspended prison sentence by the Nouméa court. His wife had this time decided to file a complaint, after being attacked for the 3rd time.2

The elected representative of the North Province was not moved at the hearing.

=== Favoritism offense ===
On June 15, 2021, Paul Néaoutyine was sentenced on appeal to 4 months suspended prison sentence, and 1 million CFP francs in almond, in the "fleur de vie" case, for the offense of favoritism. 3

The fleur de vie association was awarded by the elected official between 2010 and 2016, a transport contract for disabled children, for an amount of more than 200 million CFP francs, and this without going through a call for 'offer, or competitive bidding, as is the normal protocol.
