= Balabio Island =

Small Pacific island of New Caledonia

Balabio
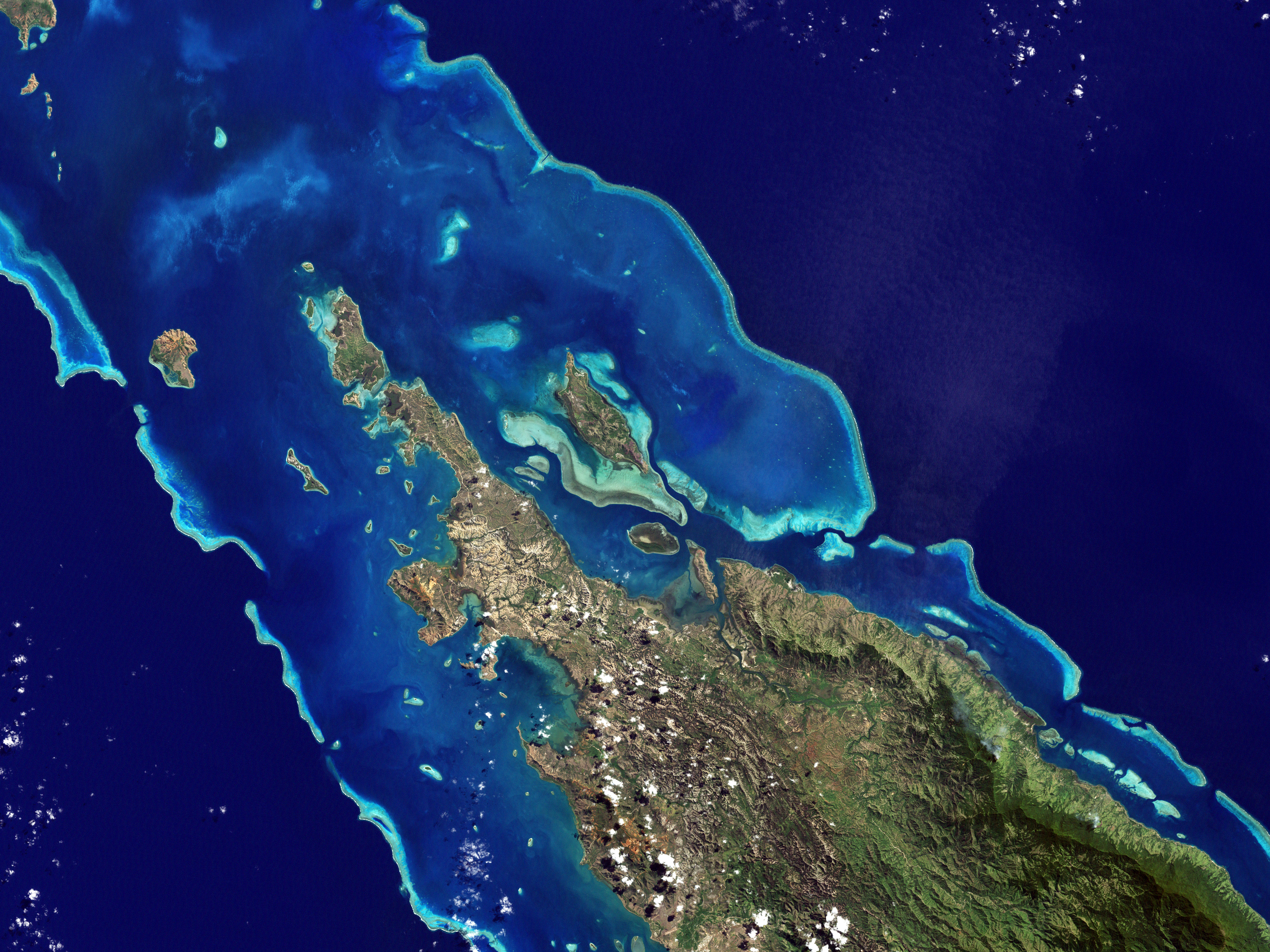
- Northern Grand Terre, with Balabio island shown in the centre
- Interactive map of Balabio

Geography
- Location: Pacific Ocean
- Coordinates: 20°06′36″S 164°10′04″E
- Archipelago: New Caledonia
- Area: 38.92 km^{2} (15.03 sq mi)
- Highest elevation: 286 m (938 ft)
- Sui generis collectivity: New Caledonia
- Province: North Province
- Commune: Poum

Demographics
- Population: 5? (2019)

Balabio Island is a small Pacific island of New Caledonia administered from Poum in the North Province.

== Geography ==
Bordered by coral reefs and with extensive mangroves, the island has a coastline of 33.6 km. It has a majority of dry forest vegetation, with some extremely rare species (Agatea veillonii). It rises to just under 300m with two small peaks.

It is close to the Dewarenne canal and across from Harcourt bay, in the extreme north west of Grande Terre, New Caledonia.

== History ==
Little is known. The island is encompassed by the Hoot ma Whaap cultural region, and the Nyêlâyu language. One document describes pottery dating to the first millennium AD. Another describes a burial site from the same period.

An aide to Captain Cook, Lt. Pickersgill, visited in 1774. Jules Garnier visited the island in February 1864. He was preceded by the New Zealand-based missionary Mary Wallis in 1851. An anthropologist, Dennis Monnerie, states that the population of Balabio was greater in the past, and always linked customarily to Arama further down the east coast of Grande Terre. The Catholic church arrived on the island between 1843 and 1860, possibly through converts, and one clan was forced off the island to the Belep islands during this process.

The island is situated in a remote location, obviously requiring boat access. The adjacent shoreline of Grande Terre has very few settlements or population. Despite having freshwater streams, it has attracted limited occupation by Kanak clans over the last two millennia, and almost none by European colonisers since they arrived in the 1800s other than one or two graziers and fishermen. Rocheteau reports early settler efforts at establishing cattle or sheep grazing, and two Japanese fish traders were on the island in the 1930s. There is no evidence of roads or nickel mining, which exists on other fringing islands nearby and on the mainland of Grande Terre. Balabio rock formations do not contain adequate nickel concentrations.

There is a small settlement of Kanak houses on a north west peninsula, and 2-3 dwellings elsewhere. The detailed clan affiliation and histories of Kanak residents are unknown.

== See also ==
- Geography of New Caledonia
- Poum
- Nickel mining in New Caledonia
