= Ee Mungu Nguvu Yetu =

National anthem of Kenya

English: O God of all Creation
- National anthem of Kenya
- Lyrics: Graham Hyslop, G. W. Senoga-Zake, Thomas Kalume, Peter Kibukosya, Washington Omondi, 1963
- Music: Collectively, 1963
- Adopted: 1968

Audio sample
- U.S. Navy Band instrumental version: file; help

"Ee Mungu Nguvu Yetu" (English: "O God of all Creation", lit. '"O God, our strength"') is the national anthem of Kenya.

== History ==
U.S. Navy Band instrumental version (one verse)

"Ee Mungu Nguvu Yetu"'s lyrics were originally written in Kiswahili, the national language of Kenya. The commission responsible for its creation included five members and was headed by the Kenya Music Adviser. The anthem was based on a traditional tune sung by Pokomo mothers to their children.

"Ee Mungu Nguvu Yetu" is notable for being one of the first national anthems to be specifically commissioned. It was written by the Kenyan Anthem Commission in 1963 to serve as the state anthem after independence from the United Kingdom. The lyrics was intended to express the deepest convictions and highest aspirations of the people.

== Lyrics ==
Swahili original

I
Ee Mungu nguvu yetu
Ilete baraka kwetu
Haki iwe ngao na mlinzi
Natukae na undugu
Amani na uhuru
Raha tupate na ustawi.

II
Amkeni ndugu zetu
Tufanye sote bidii
Nasi tujitoe kwa nguvu
Nchi yetu ya Kenya
Tunayoipenda
Tuwe tayari kuilinda

III
Natujenge taifa letu
Ee ndio wajibu wetu
Kenya istahili heshima
Tuungane mikono
Pamoja kazini
Kila siku tuwe na shukrani

IPA transcription (Note: See Help:IPA/Swahili and Swahili language § Phonology.)

1
[ɛː mu.ᵑɡu ᵑɡu.vu jɛ.tu]
[i.lɛ.tɛ ɓɑ.rɑ.kɑ kwɛ.tu]
[hɑ.ki i.wɛ ᵑɡɑ.ɔ nɑ mli.ⁿzi]
[nɑ.tu.kɑ.ɛ nɑ u.ⁿdu.ɠu]
[ɑ.mɑ.ni nɑ u.hu.ru]
[rɑ.hɑ tu.pɑ.tɛ nɑ us.tɑ.wi]

2
[ɑm.kɛ.ni ⁿdu.ɠu zɛ.tu]
[tu.fɑ.ɲɛ sɔ.tɛ bi.diː]
[nɑ.si tu.ʄi.tɔ.ɛ kwɑ ᵑɡu.vu]
[ⁿ.t͡ʃi jɛ.tu jɑ kɛ.ɲɑ]
[tu.nɑ.jɔ.i.pɛ.ⁿdɑ]
[tu.wɛ tɑ.jɑ.ri ku.i.li.ⁿdɑ]

3
[nɑ.tu.ʄɛ.ᵑɡɛ tɑi̯.fɑ lɛ.tu]
[ɛː ⁿdi.ɔ wɑ.ʄi.bu wɛ.tu]
[kɛ.ɲɑ is.tɑ.hi.li hɛ.ʃi.mɑ]
[tuː.ᵑɡɑ.nɛ mi.kɔ.nɔ]
[pɑ.mɔ.ʄɑ kɑ.zi.ni]
[ki.lɑ si.ku tu.wɛ nɑ.ʃuk.rɑ.ni]

Literal English translation

I
O God our strength
Bring a blessing to us
Justice be our shield and defender
Let us have brotherhood
Peace and freedom.
Happiness we get and prosperity.

II
Awake, our brethren;
Let's all work hard
And let us give ourselves mightily
Our country of Kenya
That we love
Let's be ready to defend it

III
Let's build our nation
O that's our responsibility
Kenya deserves respect
Let's join hands
Together at work
Every day let us be thankful.

English lyrics

I
O God of all creation
Bless this our land and nation
Justice be our shield and defender
May we dwell in unity
Peace and liberty
Plenty be found within our borders.

II
Let one and all arise
With hearts both strong and true
Service be our earnest endeavour
And our homeland of Kenya
Heritage of splendour
Firm may we stand to defend.

III
Let all with one accord
In common bond united
Build this our nation together
And the glory of Kenya
The fruit of our labour
Fill every heart with thanksgiving.
