= Kaewatine =

- Village
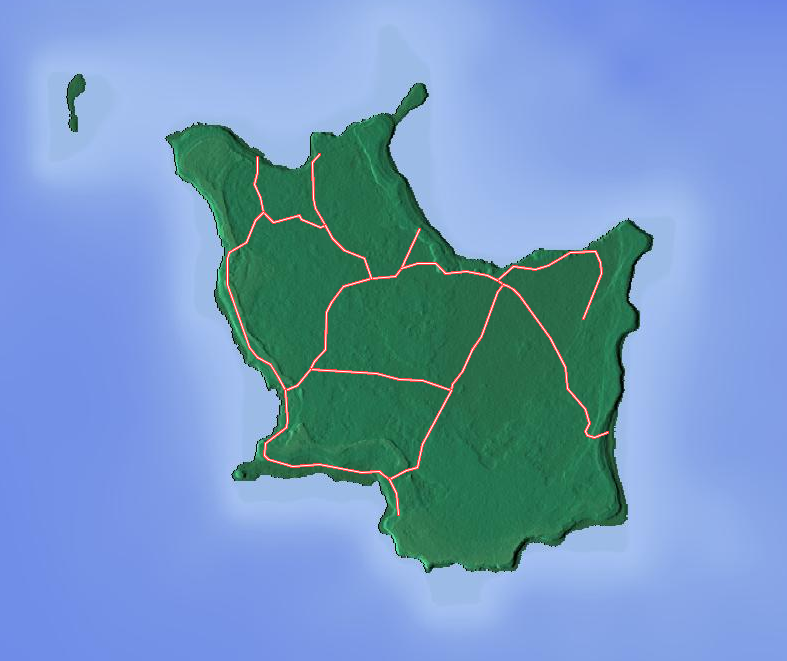
- Location in Maré Island
- Coordinates: 21°23′26″S 167°56′8″E
- Territory: New Caledonia, France
- Province: Loyalty Islands Province
- Commune: Maré
- Time zone: UTC+11

Kaewatine is a village in the northeast of Maré Island, in the Loyalty Islands of New Caledonia. It lies east by road from Thogone and north of Menaku.
