= Kuto =

Kuto is a surname of Kenyan origin. Notable people with the surname include:

- Julius Kuto (born 1984), Kenyan marathon runner
- Thomas Johnson Kuto Kalume (died 1975), Kenyan politician and clergyman
