= Geography of New Caledonia =

New Caledonia
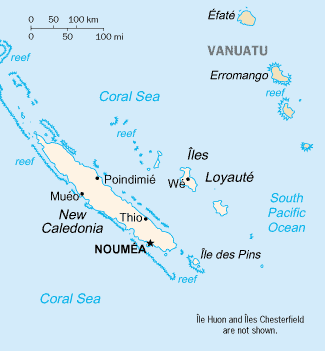
- Map of New Caledonia

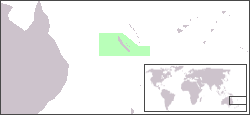

Geography
- Location: Pacific Ocean
- Coordinates: 21.350781°S 165.432129°E
- Area: 18,575 km^{2} (7,172 sq mi)
- Area rank: 53rd
- Length: 350 km (217 mi)
- Width: 70 km (43 mi)
- Highest elevation: 1,628 m (5341 ft)
- Highest point: Mont Panié

Administration
- France
- Overseas departments and territories of France: New Caledonia
- Largest settlement: Nouméa (pop. 91,386)

Demographics
- Population: 208,709 (2004)
- Pop. density: 12.75/km^{2} (33.02/sq mi)
- Ethnic groups: Melanesian 44.6%, European 34.5%, Wallisian 9.1%, Tahitian 2.7%, Indonesian 2.6%, Vietnamese 1.4%, Ni-Vanuatu 1.2%, other (Filipino) 3.9%

New Caledonia (Note: Previously known officially as the "Territory of New Caledonia and Dependencies" (French: Territoire de la Nouvelle-Calédonie et dépendances), then simply as the "Territory of New Caledonia" (French: Territoire de la Nouvelle-Calédonie), the official French name is now only Nouvelle-Calédonie. French courts often continue to use the appellation Territoire de la Nouvelle-Calédonie.) (Nouvelle-Calédonie) is an overseas collectivity of France located in the subregion of Melanesia, with a geography that makes the continental island group unique in the southwest Pacific. Among other things, the island chain has played a role in preserving unique biological lineages from the Mesozoic. It served as a waystation in the expansion of the predecessors of the Polynesians, the Lapita culture. Under the Free French it was a vital naval base for Allied Forces during the War in the Pacific.

The archipelago is located east of Australia, north of New Zealand, south of the Equator, and just west of Fiji and Vanuatu. New Caledonia comprises a main island, Grande Terre, the Loyalty Islands, and several smaller islands. Approximately half the size of Taiwan, the group has a land area of 18,575.5 square kilometres (7,172.0 square miles). The islands have a coastline of 2,254 km (1,401 mi). New Caledonia claims an exclusive fishing zone to a distance of 200 nmi or 370 km or 230 mi and a territorial sea of 12 nmi (22 km; 14 mi) from shore.

New Caledonia is one of the northernmost parts of an almost entirely (93%) submerged continent called Zealandia, which rifted away from Antarctica between 130 and 85 million years ago (mya), and from Australia 85–60 mya. Most of the elongated triangular continental mass of Zealandia is a subsurface plateau. New Zealand is a mountainous above-water promontory in its center, and New Caledonia is a promontory ridge on the continent's northern edge. New Caledonia itself drifted away from Australia 66 mya, and subsequently drifted in a north-easterly direction, reaching its present position about 50 mya. Given its long stability and isolation, New Caledonia serves as a unique island refugium hosting a unique ecosystem and preserving Gondwanan plant and animal lineages no longer found elsewhere.

== Composition ==
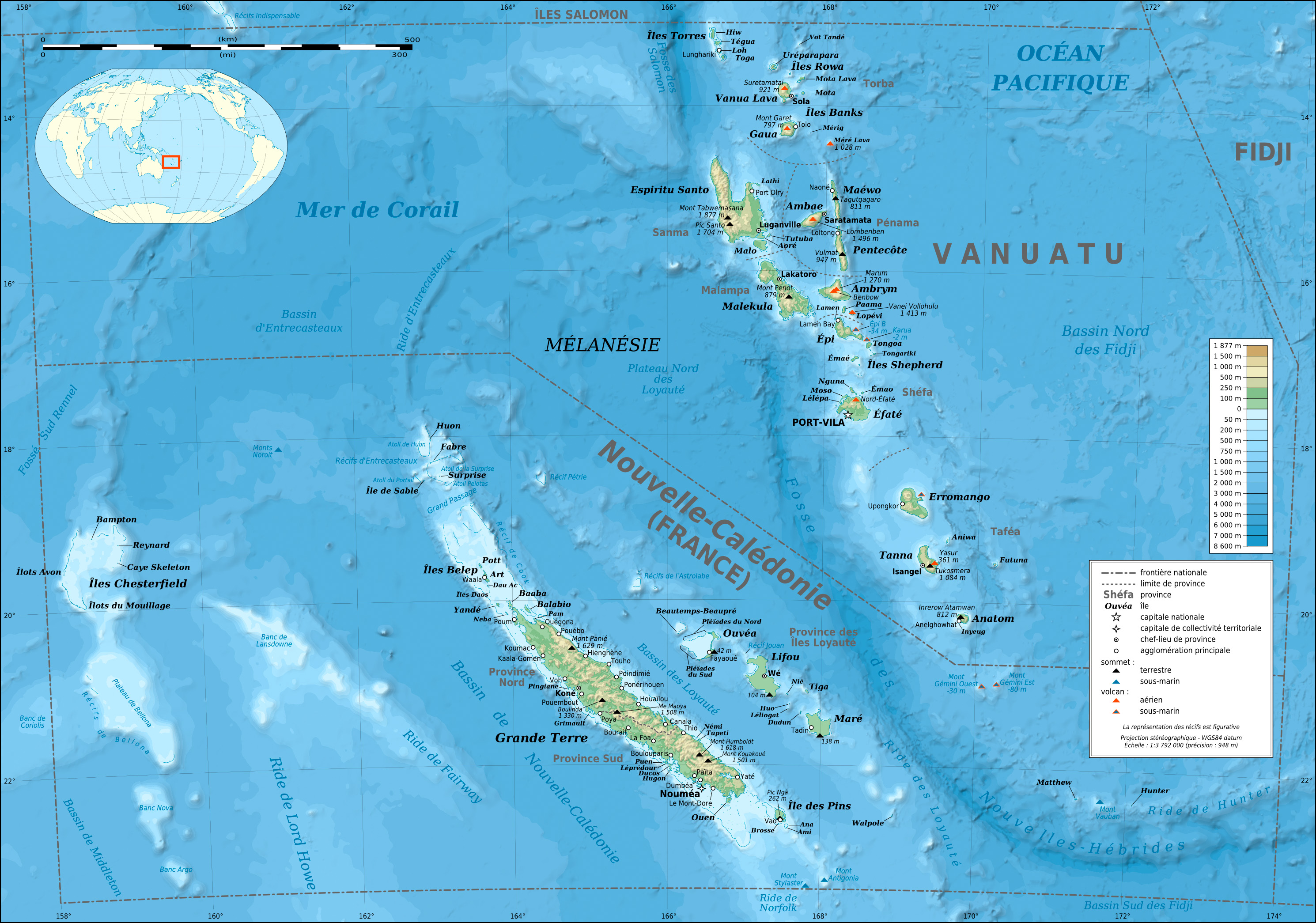
An expandable bathymetric and topographic map of New Caledonia and Vanuatu, formerly the New Hebrides. Click to enlarge.

New Caledonia is made up of a main island, the Grande Terre, and several smaller islands, the Belep archipelago to the north of the Grande Terre, the Loyalty Islands to the east of the Grande Terre, the Isle of Pines to the south of the Grande Terre, the Chesterfield Islands and Bellona Reefs further to the west. Each of these four island groups has a different geological origin:

- The New Caledonia archipelago, which includes Grande Terre, Belep, and the Île des Pins was born as a series of folds of the Earth's mantle between the Permian period (251–299 mya) and the Paleogene and Neogene periods (1.5–66 mya). This mantle obduction created large areas of peridotite and a bedrock rich in nickel.
- The Loyalty Islands, a hundred kilometers to the east, are coral and limestone islands built on top of ancient collapsed volcanoes originating due to subduction at the Vanuatu trench.
- The Chesterfield Islands, 550 kilometres (340 miles) to the northwest, are reef outcroppings of the oceanic plateau.
- The Matthew and Hunter Islands, at 450 and 520 kilometres (280 and 320 miles) east, respectively, are volcanic islands that form the southern end of the arc of the New Hebrides.

The Grande Terre is by far the largest of the islands and the only mountainous island. It has an area of 16,372 square kilometres (6,321 square miles), and is elongated northwest–southeast, 350 kilometres (220 miles) in length and 50 to 70 kilometres (31 to 43 miles) wide. A mountain range runs the length of the island, with five peaks over 1,500 meters (4,900 feet). The highest point is Mont Panié at 1,628 meters (5,341 feet) elevation. The total area of New Caledonia is 19,060 km^{2} (7,360 sq mi), 18,575 km^{2} (7,172 sq mi) of those being land.

A territorial dispute exists with regard to the uninhabited Matthew and Hunter Islands, which are claimed by both France (as part of New Caledonia) and Vanuatu.

== Zealandian origin ==
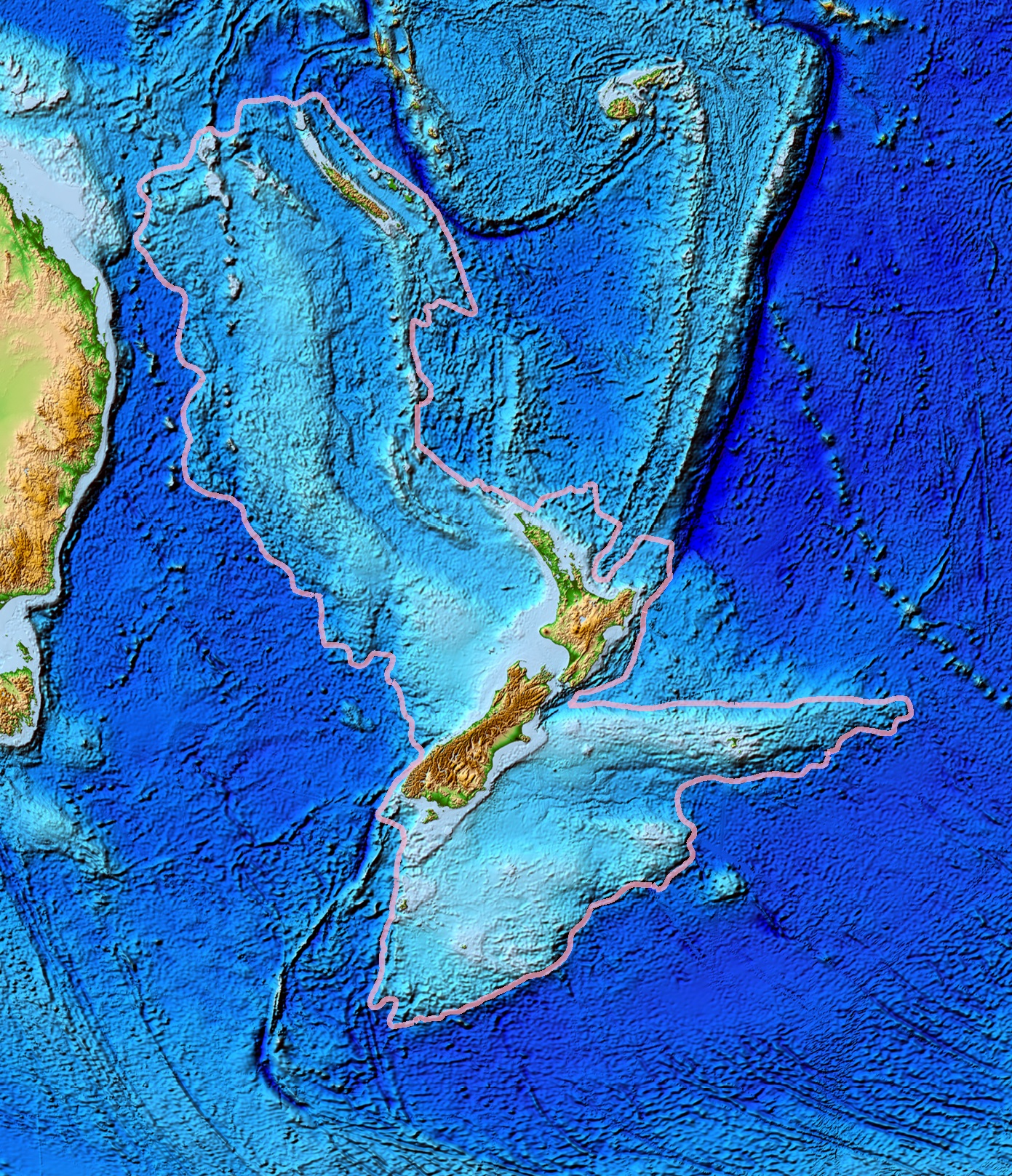
Topography of Zealandia. New Caledonia is the slender island in the top left quadrant of the image at 11 o'clock from New Zealand. The ridges running north-northeast and southwest from New Zealand are not part of the continent.

The New Caledonian archipelago is a microcontinental island chain which originated as a fragment of Zealandia, a nearly submerged continent or microcontinent which was part of the southern supercontinent of Gondwana during the time of the dinosaurs. The Grande Terre group of New Caledonia, with Mont Panié at 1,628 meters (5,341 feet) as its highest point, is the most elevated part of the Norfolk Ridge, a long and mostly underwater arm of the continent. While they were still one landmass, Zealandia and Australia combined broke away from Antarctica between 85 and 130 million years ago. Australia and Zealandia split apart 60–85 million years ago. Although biologists consider it contrary to the evidence of surviving Gondwanan lineages, geologists consider the logical possibility that Zealandia may have been completely submerged about 23 million years ago. While a continent like Australia consists of a large body of land surrounded by a fringe of continental shelf, Zealandia consists almost entirely of continental shelf, with the vast majority, some 93%, submerged beneath the Pacific Ocean. This viewpoint is not universal. Bernard Pelletier argues that Grande Terre was completely submerged for millions of years, and hence the origin of the flora may not be local in nature, but due to long distance-dispersal.

Zealandia is 3,500,000 km^{2} (1,351,358 sq mi) in area, larger than Greenland or India, and almost half the size of Australia. It is unusually slender, stretching from New Caledonia in the north to beyond New Zealand's subantarctic islands in the south (from latitude 19° south to 56° south, analogous to ranging from Haiti to Hudson Bay or from Sudan to Sweden in the Northern Hemisphere). New Zealand is the greatest part of Zealandia above sea level, followed by New Caledonia.

Given its continental origin as a fragment of Zealandia, unlike many of the islands of the Pacific such as the Hawaiian chain, New Caledonia is not of geographically recent volcanic provenance. Its separation from Australia at the end of the Cretaceous (65 mya) and from New Zealand in the mid-Miocene has led to a long period of evolution in near complete isolation. New Caledonia's natural heritage significantly comprises species whose ancestors were ancient and primitive flora and fauna present on New Caledonia when it broke away from Gondwana millions of years ago, not only species but entire genera and even families are unique to the island, and survive nowhere else.

Since the age of the dinosaurs, as the island moved north due to the effects of continental drift, some geologists assert that it may have been fully submerged at various intervals. Botanists, however, argue that there must have been some areas that remained above sea level, serving as refugia for the descendants of the original flora that inhabited the island when it broke away from Gondwana. The isolation of New Caledonia was not absolute, however. New species came to New Caledonia while species of Gondwanan origin were able to penetrate further eastward into the Pacific Island region.

== Climate ==
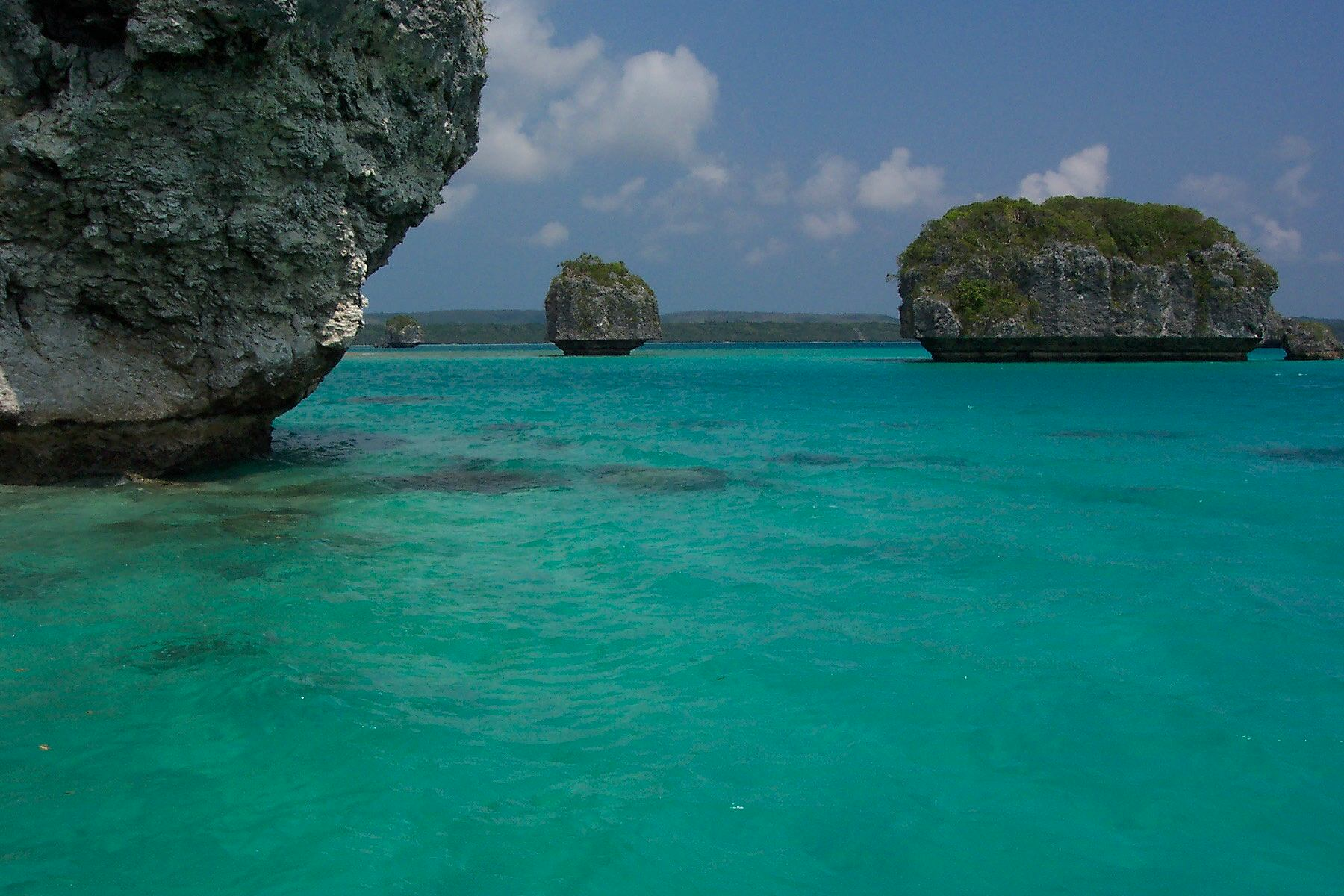
Upi Bay on the southern Isle of Pines

The climate of New Caledonia is tropical, modified by southeasterly trade winds. It is hot and humid. Natural hazards are posed in New Caledonia by cyclones, which occur most frequently between November and March. While rainfall in the neighboring Vanuatu islands averages two meters annually, from the north of New Caledonia to the south the rain decreases to a little over 1,000 mm (39 in). The mean annual temperature drops over the same interval from 27.5 to 24.3 °C (81.5 to 75.7 °F), and seasonality becomes more pronounced. The capital, Nouméa, located on a peninsula on the southwestern coast of the island normally has a dry season which increases in intensity from August until mid-December, ending suddenly with the coming of rain in January. The northeastern coast of the island receives the most rain, with 2,400 mm (94 in) having been recorded near sea level in Pouébo.

Climate data for Nouméa (Köppen Aw)
Month	Jan	Feb	Mar	Apr	May	Jun	Jul	Aug	Sep	Oct	Nov	Dec	Year
Record high °C (°F)	36.8 (98.2)	36.4 (97.5)	36.4 (97.5)	36.1 (97.0)	32.7 (90.9)	30.7 (87.3)	34.0 (93.2)	31.7 (89.1)	33.0 (91.4)	32.3 (90.1)	34.9 (94.8)	35.7 (96.3)	36.8 (98.2)
Mean daily maximum °C (°F)	29.5 (85.1)	29.9 (85.8)	29.0 (84.2)	27.4 (81.3)	25.6 (78.1)	24.2 (75.6)	23.4 (74.1)	23.4 (74.1)	24.7 (76.5)	26.2 (79.2)	27.6 (81.7)	29.1 (84.4)	26.7 (80.1)
Daily mean °C (°F)	26.5 (79.7)	26.9 (80.4)	26.2 (79.2)	24.7 (76.5)	22.9 (73.2)	21.6 (70.9)	20.6 (69.1)	20.5 (68.9)	21.5 (70.7)	22.9 (73.2)	24.3 (75.7)	25.8 (78.4)	23.7 (74.7)
Mean daily minimum °C (°F)	23.4 (74.1)	24.0 (75.2)	23.5 (74.3)	22.0 (71.6)	20.2 (68.4)	18.9 (66.0)	17.7 (63.9)	17.5 (63.5)	18.3 (64.9)	19.6 (67.3)	21.0 (69.8)	22.5 (72.5)	20.7 (69.3)
Record low °C (°F)	18.6 (65.5)	19.0 (66.2)	18.8 (65.8)	16.7 (62.1)	15.7 (60.3)	13.6 (56.5)	13.5 (56.3)	13.2 (55.8)	13.3 (55.9)	14.2 (57.6)	15.2 (59.4)	17.8 (64.0)	13.2 (55.8)
Average precipitation mm (inches)	107.2 (4.22)	128.3 (5.05)	161.9 (6.37)	118.3 (4.66)	89.9 (3.54)	77.5 (3.05)	69.8 (2.75)	67.5 (2.66)	39.3 (1.55)	36.3 (1.43)	44.2 (1.74)	64.0 (2.52)	1,004.2 (39.54)
Average precipitation days (≥ 1.0 mm)	10.1	10.8	11.9	11.7	11.3	9.3	9.4	8.4	5.8	4.8	6.0	6.7	106.3
Mean monthly sunshine hours	238.5	205.6	196.1	193.1	173.2	154.6	182.4	203.5	230.8	258.6	250.6	261.8	2,548.7
Source 1: Météo-France, Meteociel (sunshine 1981-2010)
Source 2: Service de la météorologie de la Nouvelle-Calédonie

Climate data for Lifou (Köppen Af/Am)
Month	Jan	Feb	Mar	Apr	May	Jun	Jul	Aug	Sep	Oct	Nov	Dec	Year
Record high °C (°F)	33.3 (91.9)	34.6 (94.3)	32.1 (89.8)	31.9 (89.4)	30.3 (86.5)	29.5 (85.1)	30.0 (86.0)	28.9 (84.0)	30.6 (87.1)	30.3 (86.5)	32.2 (90.0)	32.8 (91.0)	34.6 (94.3)
Mean daily maximum °C (°F)	29.6 (85.3)	30.0 (86.0)	29.3 (84.7)	28.1 (82.6)	26.3 (79.3)	25.0 (77.0)	24.3 (75.7)	24.4 (75.9)	25.4 (77.7)	26.6 (79.9)	27.7 (81.9)	28.9 (84.0)	27.1 (80.8)
Daily mean °C (°F)	26.2 (79.2)	26.6 (79.9)	26.2 (79.2)	24.9 (76.8)	22.7 (72.9)	21.4 (70.5)	20.1 (68.2)	20.0 (68.0)	21.0 (69.8)	22.5 (72.5)	23.9 (75.0)	25.3 (77.5)	23.4 (74.1)
Mean daily minimum °C (°F)	22.8 (73.0)	23.3 (73.9)	23.1 (73.6)	21.7 (71.1)	19.1 (66.4)	17.7 (63.9)	15.9 (60.6)	15.7 (60.3)	16.6 (61.9)	18.5 (65.3)	20.0 (68.0)	21.6 (70.9)	19.7 (67.5)
Record low °C (°F)	11.0 (51.8)	14.1 (57.4)	13.6 (56.5)	10.9 (51.6)	7.4 (45.3)	5.5 (41.9)	4.4 (39.9)	4.5 (40.1)	5.5 (41.9)	7.0 (44.6)	8.5 (47.3)	10.0 (50.0)	4.4 (39.9)
Average precipitation mm (inches)	174.2 (6.86)	194.9 (7.67)	242.4 (9.54)	185.2 (7.29)	144.8 (5.70)	127.8 (5.03)	88.2 (3.47)	70.8 (2.79)	70.4 (2.77)	66.6 (2.62)	75.9 (2.99)	137.8 (5.43)	1,579 (62.17)
Average precipitation days (≥ 1.0 mm)	12.1	13.0	15.4	11.9	11.7	9.5	8.0	6.5	6.2	7.0	7.4	10.1	118.8
Mean monthly sunshine hours	223.4	186.8	194.0	194.6	178.3	151.4	180.0	194.5	208.7	236.1	230.1	233.8	2,411.5
Source 1: Météo-France
Source 2: Service de la météorologie de la Nouvelle-Calédonie

Climate data for Poindimié (Köppen Af)
Month	Jan	Feb	Mar	Apr	May	Jun	Jul	Aug	Sep	Oct	Nov	Dec	Year
Record high °C (°F)	33.8 (92.8)	34.2 (93.6)	34.4 (93.9)	32.8 (91.0)	31.2 (88.2)	30.2 (86.4)	29.0 (84.2)	30.3 (86.5)	32.1 (89.8)	31.0 (87.8)	33.0 (91.4)	33.3 (91.9)	34.4 (93.9)
Mean daily maximum °C (°F)	29.5 (85.1)	29.9 (85.8)	29.5 (85.1)	28.4 (83.1)	26.9 (80.4)	25.5 (77.9)	24.8 (76.6)	24.7 (76.5)	25.6 (78.1)	26.5 (79.7)	27.5 (81.5)	28.6 (83.5)	27.3 (81.1)
Daily mean °C (°F)	26.4 (79.5)	26.8 (80.2)	26.5 (79.7)	25.3 (77.5)	23.6 (74.5)	22.2 (72.0)	21.2 (70.2)	21.1 (70.0)	22.0 (71.6)	23.1 (73.6)	24.2 (75.6)	25.5 (77.9)	24.0 (75.2)
Mean daily minimum °C (°F)	23.3 (73.9)	23.7 (74.7)	23.4 (74.1)	22.1 (71.8)	20.3 (68.5)	18.9 (66.0)	17.6 (63.7)	17.5 (63.5)	18.4 (65.1)	19.7 (67.5)	21.0 (69.8)	22.4 (72.3)	20.7 (69.3)
Record low °C (°F)	17.6 (63.7)	17.9 (64.2)	16.2 (61.2)	15.8 (60.4)	13.5 (56.3)	12.5 (54.5)	11.2 (52.2)	11.0 (51.8)	12.5 (54.5)	12.5 (54.5)	13.1 (55.6)	14.8 (58.6)	11.0 (51.8)
Average precipitation mm (inches)	313.2 (12.33)	326.2 (12.84)	395.8 (15.58)	258.5 (10.18)	194.6 (7.66)	155.6 (6.13)	116.0 (4.57)	101.4 (3.99)	102.7 (4.04)	96.8 (3.81)	144.7 (5.70)	221.1 (8.70)	2,426.6 (95.54)
Average precipitation days (≥ 1.0 mm)	17.9	18.6	19.9	16.6	13.9	11.0	9.2	8.4	8.4	11.0	12.1	16.3	163.4
Mean monthly sunshine hours	186.9	158.8	163.5	165.3	153.1	148.2	174.3	186.6	195.5	207.9	186.3	192.0	2,118.2
Source 1: Météo-France
Source 2: Service de la météorologie de la Nouvelle-Calédonie

== Terrain ==
The terrain of Grande Terre consists of coastal plains, with mountains in the interior. The lowest point is the Pacific Ocean, with an elevation of 0 m, and the highest is Mont Panie, with an elevation of 1,628 m (5,341 ft).

The Diahot River is the longest river of New Caledonia, flowing for some 60 miles (97 kilometres). It has a catchment area of 620 square kilometres and opens north-westward into the Baie d'Harcourt, flowing towards the northern point of the island along the western escarpment of the Mount Panie.

In 1993, 12% of New Caledonian land was used for permanent pasture, with 39% occupied by forests and woodland. In 1991, 160 km^{2} (62 sq mi) of the land was irrigated. A current environmental issue is erosion caused by mining exploitation and forest fires.

== Biological isolation ==
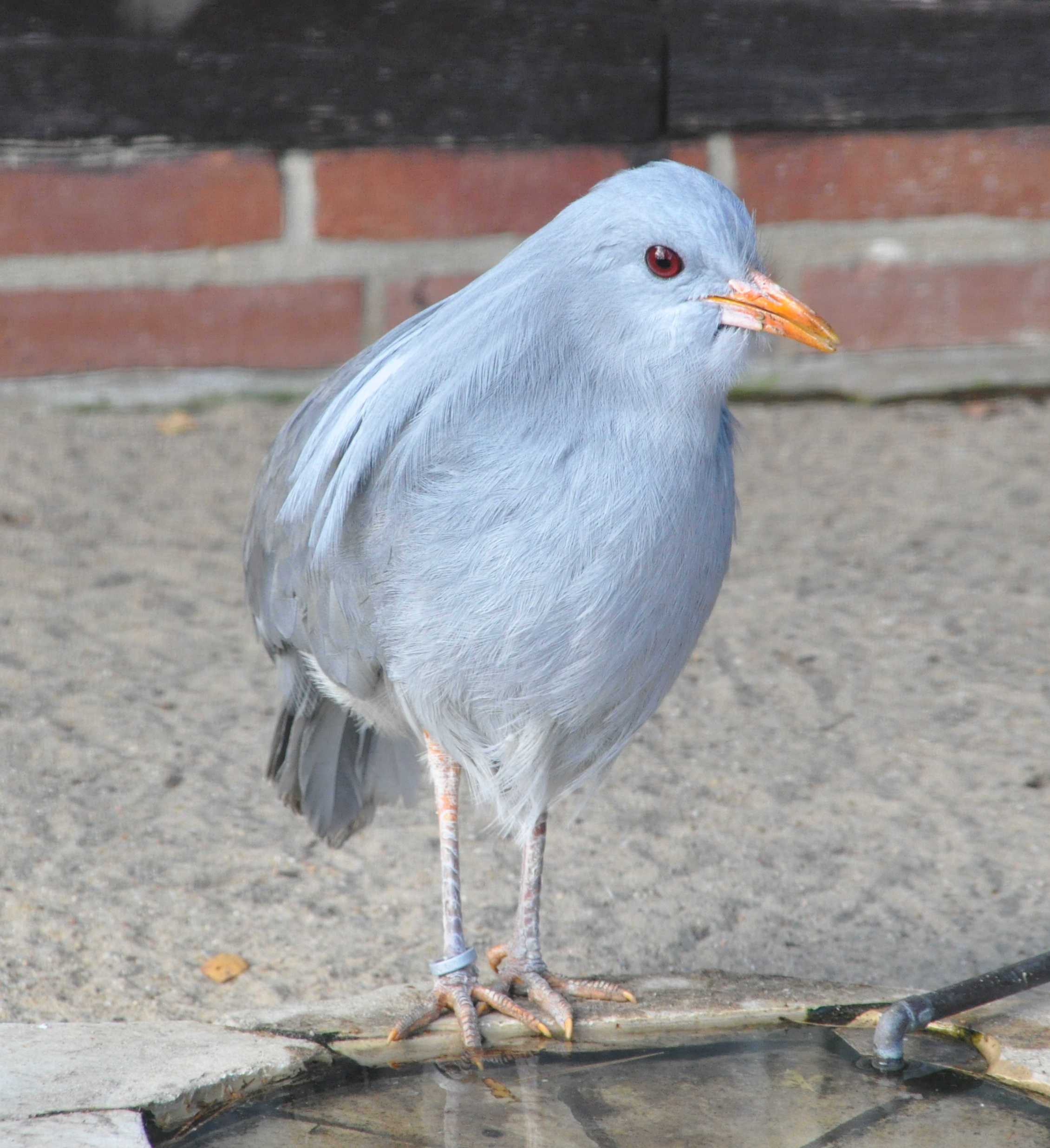
The enigmatic kagu, an endemic New Caledonian bird with no close relatives. See pictures of the erected crest and of wing patterns exposed during defensive posturing at the San Diego Zoo website.

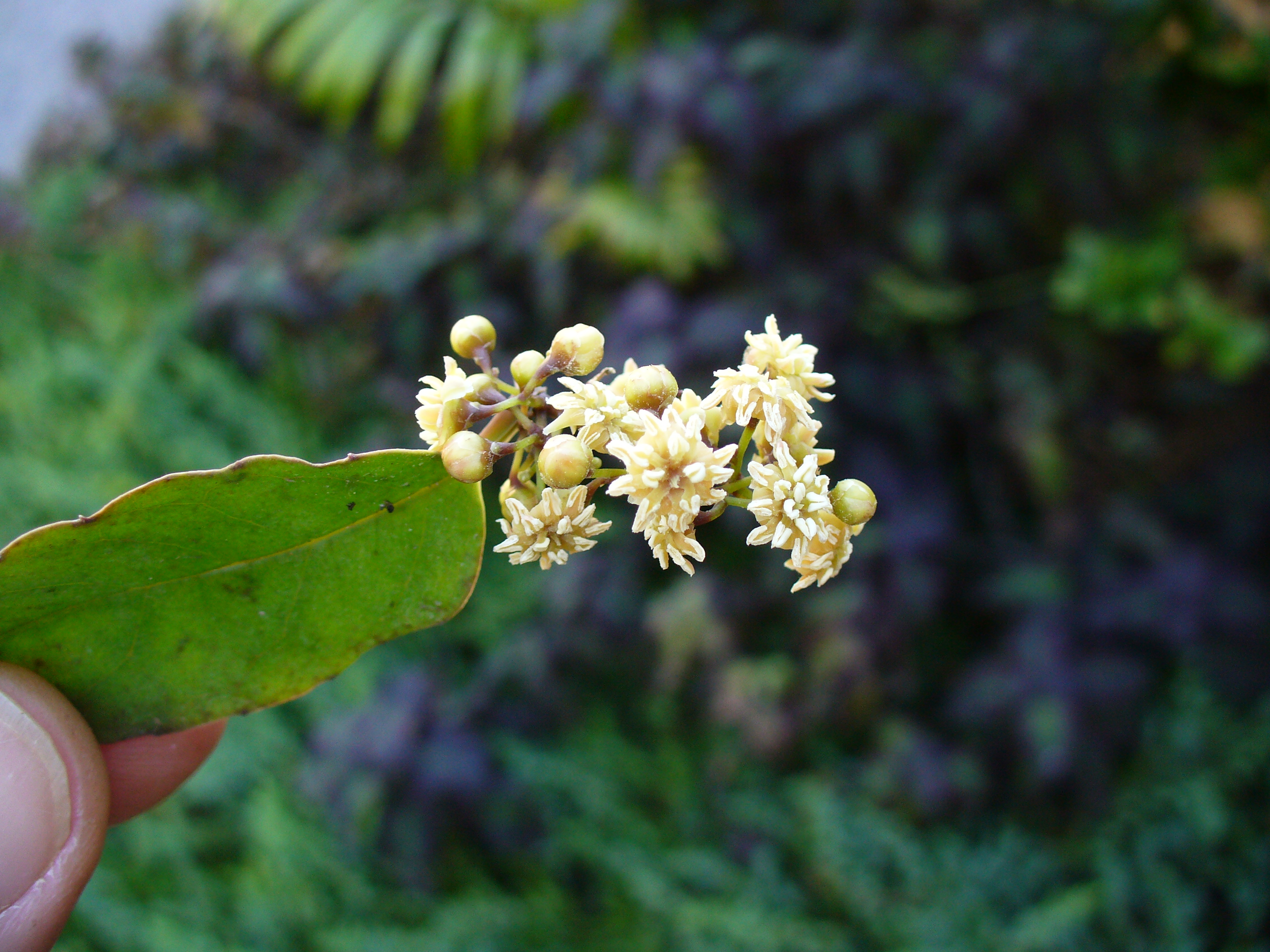
Amborella trichopoda, the world's most primitive flowering plant

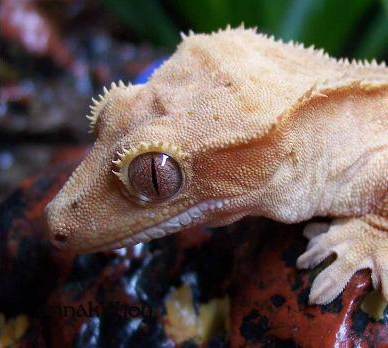
Correlophus ciliatus, the not-yet-extinct crested gecko of southern Grande Terre isle

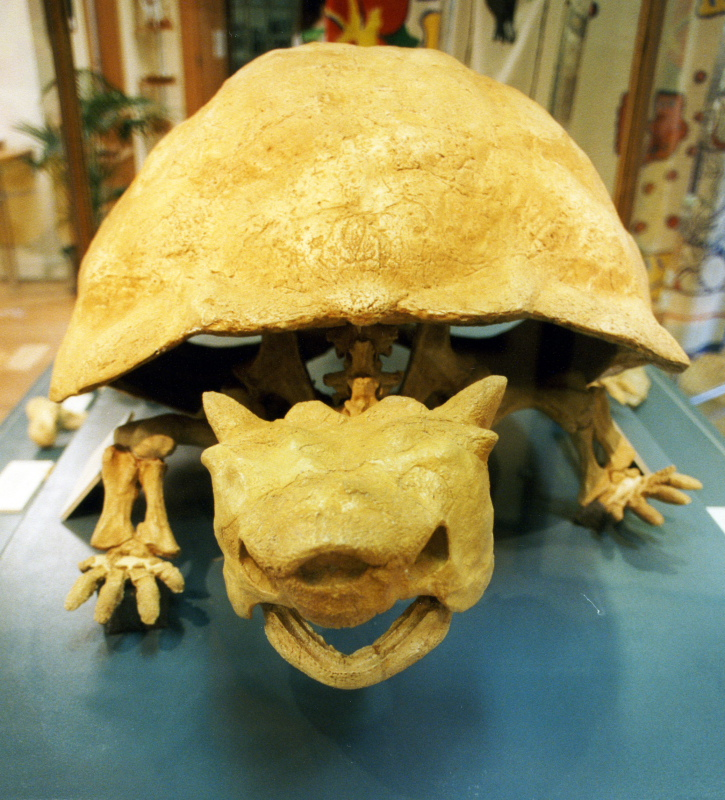
Meiolania platyceps fossil

Given its geographical isolation since the end of the Cretaceous, New Caledonia is a refugium, in effect a biological "Noah's Ark", an island home to both unique living plants and animals and also to its own special fossil endowment. Birds such as the crested and almost flightless kagu (French, cagou) Rhynochetos jubatus, whose closest relative may be the distantly related sunbittern of South America, and plants such as Amborella trichopoda, the only known member of the most basal living branch of flowering plants, make this island a treasure trove and a critical concern for biologists and conservationists. The island was home to horned fossil turtles (Meiolania mackayi) and terrestrial fossil crocodiles (Mekosuchus inexpectatus) which became extinct shortly after human arrival. There are no native amphibians, with geckos holding many of their niches. The crested gecko (Correlophus ciliatus), thought to have gone extinct, was rediscovered in 1994. At 14 inches, Leach's giant gecko (Rhacodactylus leachianus), the world's largest and a predator of smaller lizards is another native. The only native mammals are four species of bat including the endemic New Caledonia flying fox.

New Caledonia is home to 13 of the 19 extant species of evergreens in the genus Araucaria. The island has been called "a kind of 'Jurassic Park'" because of the archaic characteristics of its highly endemic vegetation. In addition to the basal angiosperm plant genus Amborella, for example, the island is home to more gymnosperm species than any other tropic landmass, with 43 of its 44 conifer species being unique to the island, which is also home to the world's only known parasitic gymnosperm, the rootless conifer Parasitaxus usta.

Given their prehistoric appearance, the dry forests of western New Caledonia were chosen as the location for filming the first episode of the BBC miniseries Walking with Dinosaurs, which was set in the Arizona of the late Triassic.

== Mineral wealth ==
After a formation discovered in Oman in the 1970s, New Caledonia has the planet's largest known outcrop of ultrabasic rock, derived not from the crust, but from an upthrust fold of the more deeply underlying mantle of the earth. These mineral-rich rocks are a source of nickel, chromium, iron, cobalt, manganese, silver, gold, lead and copper. The toxicity of the mineral-rich soil has helped preserve the endemic vegetation, which has long been adapted to it, from competition from would-be colonizers which find it unsuitable.

== Human geography ==
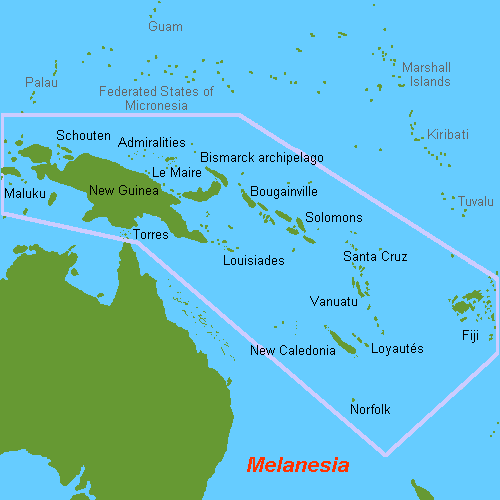
Map of Melanesia, surrounded by a pink line

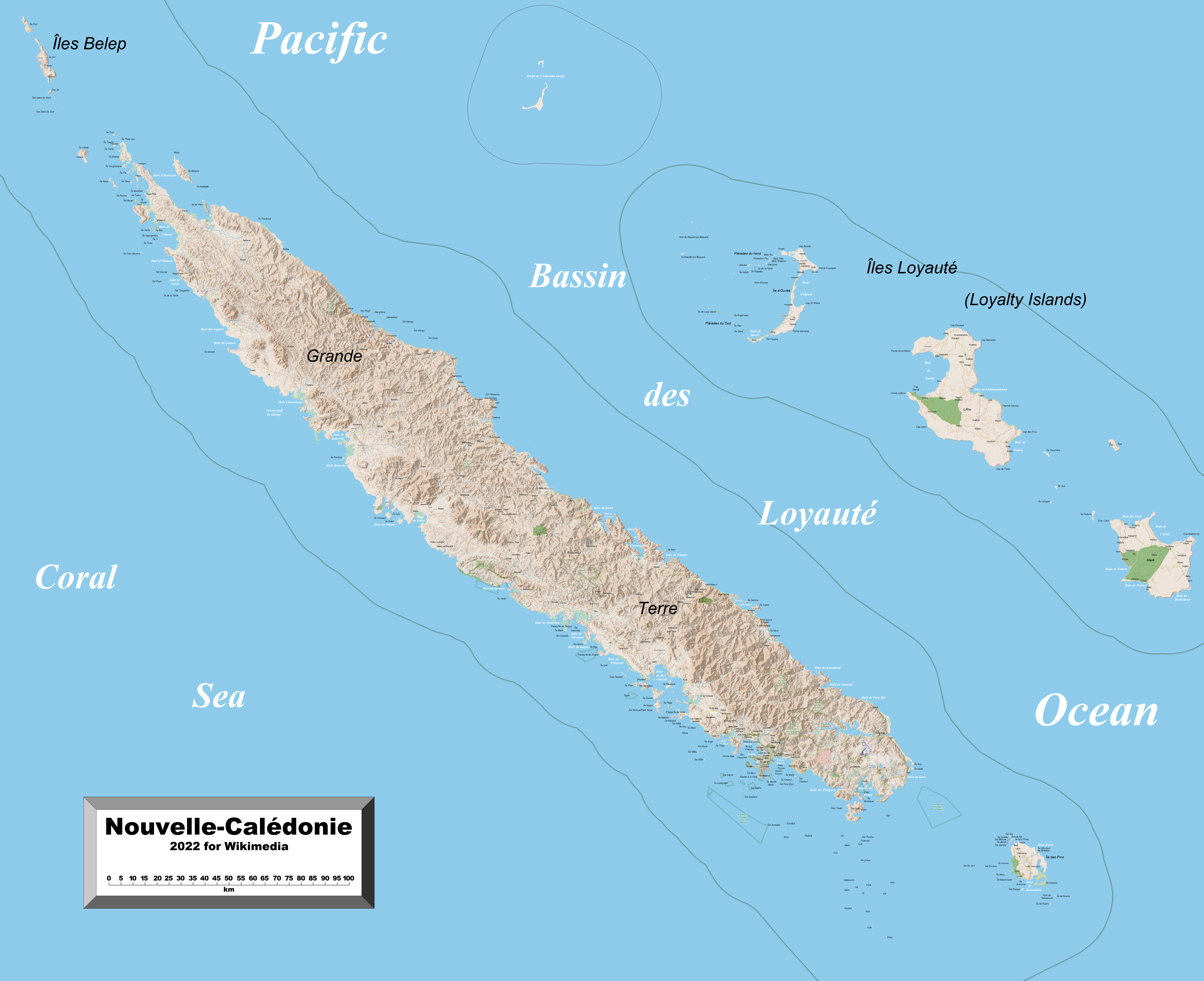
Detailed map of New Caledonia showing physical relief and the territory's towns and villages

=== Before Western contact ===
Anthropologically, New Caledonia is considered the southernmost archipelago of Melanesia, grouping it with the more close by islands to its north, rather than its geologically associated neighbour, New Zealand, to the south. The New Caledonian languages, whose speakers are called Kanaks, and the dialects of the Loyalty Islands find their closest relatives in the languages of Vanuatu to the east. Together, these comprise the Southern Oceanic language family, a member of the Oceanic language branch of the Austronesian language family. The Fijian languages, the Māori language of New Zealand, and other Polynesian languages such as Tahitian, Samoan and Hawaiian are cousins of the New Caledonian languages within the Oceanic language family.

Linguistic analysis using the comparative method provides a detailed family tree of the Austronesian languages to which the native languages of New Caledonia belong. The Lapita culture, hypothesized to have spoken proto-Oceanic, and defined by its typical style of pottery, originated to the northwest in the Bismarck Archipelago around 1500 BC. The earliest known human settlement of New Caledonia, dated to 1240 ±220 BC at the Tiwi rockshelter, is attributed to the Lapitans, who then moved on to Fiji by approximately 900 BC, whence the Polynesian expansion would begin.

=== Since Western contact ===
Western colonization of the area began in the 18th century. The British explorer James Cook sighted Grande Terre in 1774 and named it New Caledonia, Caledonia being Latin for Scotland. In 1853, under Napoleon III, the area was made a French colony. The French brought colonial subjects such as Arabs from the Maghreb to settle in the territory. Given its strategic location and that it was unoccupied by Japanese troops it played a vital role under the Free French Forces as an Allied Forces naval base during the Second World War.

Today, while French is the official language, 28 indigenous tongues are still spoken. At the 2004 census, 97.0% reported they could speak French, whereas only 0.97% reported that they had no knowledge of French. In the same census, 37.1% reported that they could speak (but not necessarily read or write) one of the 28 indigenous Austronesian languages.

At the 1996 census, the indigenous Melanesian Kanak community represented around 44.6% of the whole population. and estimated at over 41% in 2023. They are no longer a majority, their proportion of the population having declined due to immigration and other factors. The rest of the population is made up of ethnic groups that arrived in New Caledonia in the last 150 years: Europeans (34.5%) (predominantly French, with German, British and Italian minorities), Polynesians (Wallisians, Tahitians) (11.8%), Indonesians (2.6%), Vietnamese (1.4%), Ni-Vanuatu (1.2%), and various other groups (3.9%), Tamils, other South Asians, Berbers, Japanese, Chinese, Fijians, Arabs, West Indian (mostly from other French territories) and a small number of ethnic Africans.

== See also ==
- d'Entrecasteaux Ridge
- List of islands of New Caledonia

Other microcontinental islands:

- Madagascar
- Seychelles
- Socotra
