= Thomas Johnson Kuto Kalume =

Kenyan politician

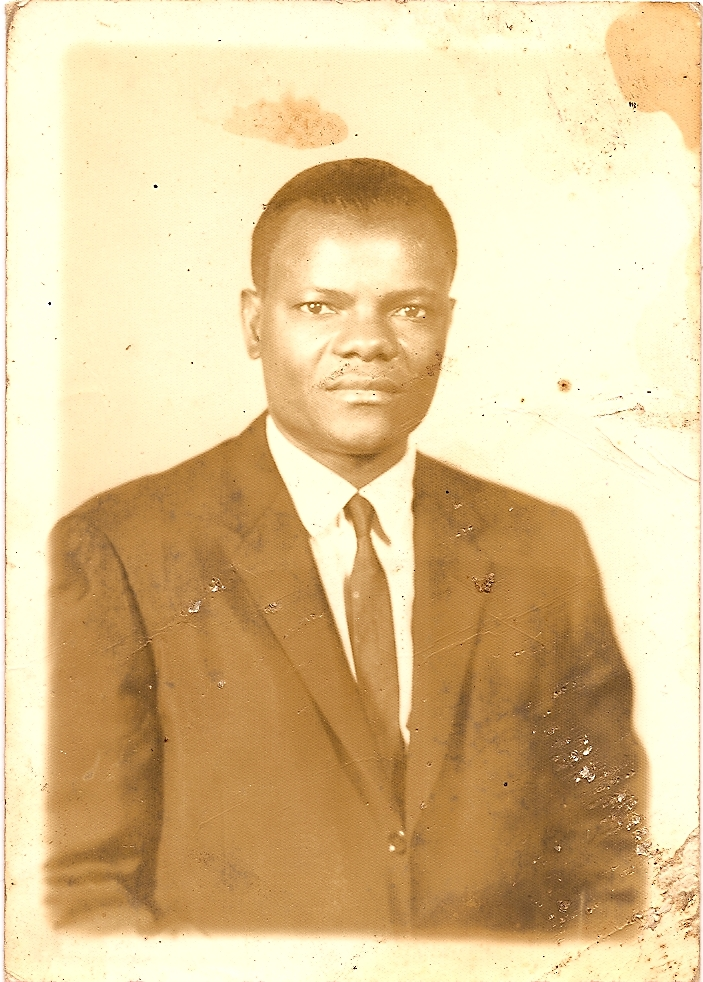

Member of Parliament for Malindi North
- In office 1969 – 15 March 1975

Personal details
- Spouse: Mama Rebeca Florence Naswa Kalume
- Children: 9 (6 boys, 3 girls)
- Education: University of London (BA); New York Theological Seminary (MA)
- Occupation: Politician, clergyman, composer

Thomas Johnson Kuto Kalume was a Kenyan politician and the first clergyman to be elected Member of Parliament (MP) in the history of the National Assembly of Kenya.

Kalume was a composer and co-producer of the Kenyan national anthem, which was recorded in English and Swahili in September 1963 and inaugurated at Uhuru Gardens on December 12, 1963, during Kenya's independence celebrations. The anthem bears an original African traditional tune from the Pokomo tribe on the coast.

== Biography ==
Kalume was born in the Dagamra division of Bate, located near the historical tourist town of Malindi. He belonged to the Kambe tribe, Taka clan from Kilifi, part of the larger Mijikenda ethnic community, which has traditionally occupied the coastal region of Kenya.

Kalume, attended the prestigious Alliance High School, Kikuyu, and proceeded to obtain a bachelor's degree in Divinity from the University of London. He later graduated with a master's degree in Theology from New York Theological Seminary. He undertook the task of translating the Bible's New Testament directly from the Hebrew scriptures to Swahili. Kalume was elected Member of Parliament in the 1969 Kenyan general election to represent Malindi North Constituency. He distinguished himself as an able, knowledgeable and conscientious representative of the people on many development issues, leading to significant improvements in agriculture, education, health and infrastructural facilities.

Kalume died on March 15, 1975, leaving behind a widow, Mama Rebeca Florence Naswa Kalume and nine children, six boys and three girls.
