= Drui =

Kind of dance in New Calendonia

Drui is a dance practiced by the Kanak peoples of New Caledonia.
