= Hugon =

Hugon is a surname and a given name. Notable people with the name include:

- Basseville, Nicolas Jean Hugon de Bassville (1743–1793), French journalist and diplomat
- Hugon Hanke (1904–1964), Polish politician, 38th Prime Minister of Poland
- André Hugon (1886–1960), French film director, screenwriter and film producer
- Anne Hugon (born 1965), French historian specialising in the history of African exploration
- Édouard Hugon (1867–1929), French Dominican Catholic priest, Thomistic philosopher and theologian
- Georges Hugon (1904–1980), French composer
- Piero Hugon (1600–1625), French servant of Anne of Denmark accused of stealing her jewels
- Pierre Hugon, French engineer and inventor
- Renée Hugon (1930–2015), French gymnast

== See also ==
- La Chapelle-Hugon, commune in the Cher department in the Centre-Val de Loire region of France
- Hugon, The Mighty, lost 1918 silent film
- French cruiser Hugon, a 19th-century cruiser of the French Navy
