= Isle of Pines (commune) =

Commune of New Caledonia

Isle of Pines L'Île-des-Pins (French) Kwényi (Numèè) Kunie (Dehu)
- Commune
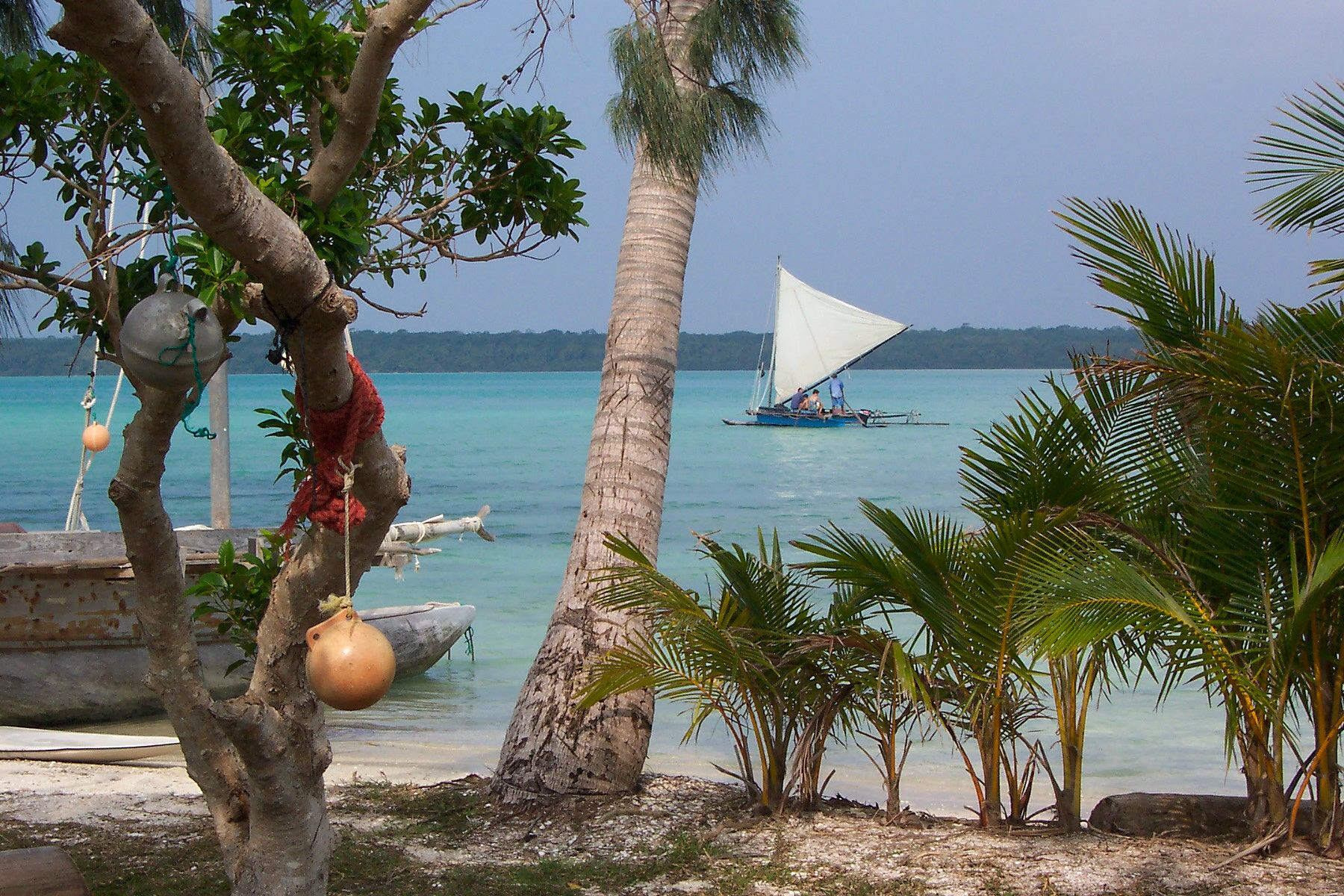
- Saint Joseph Bay on the Isle of Pines.

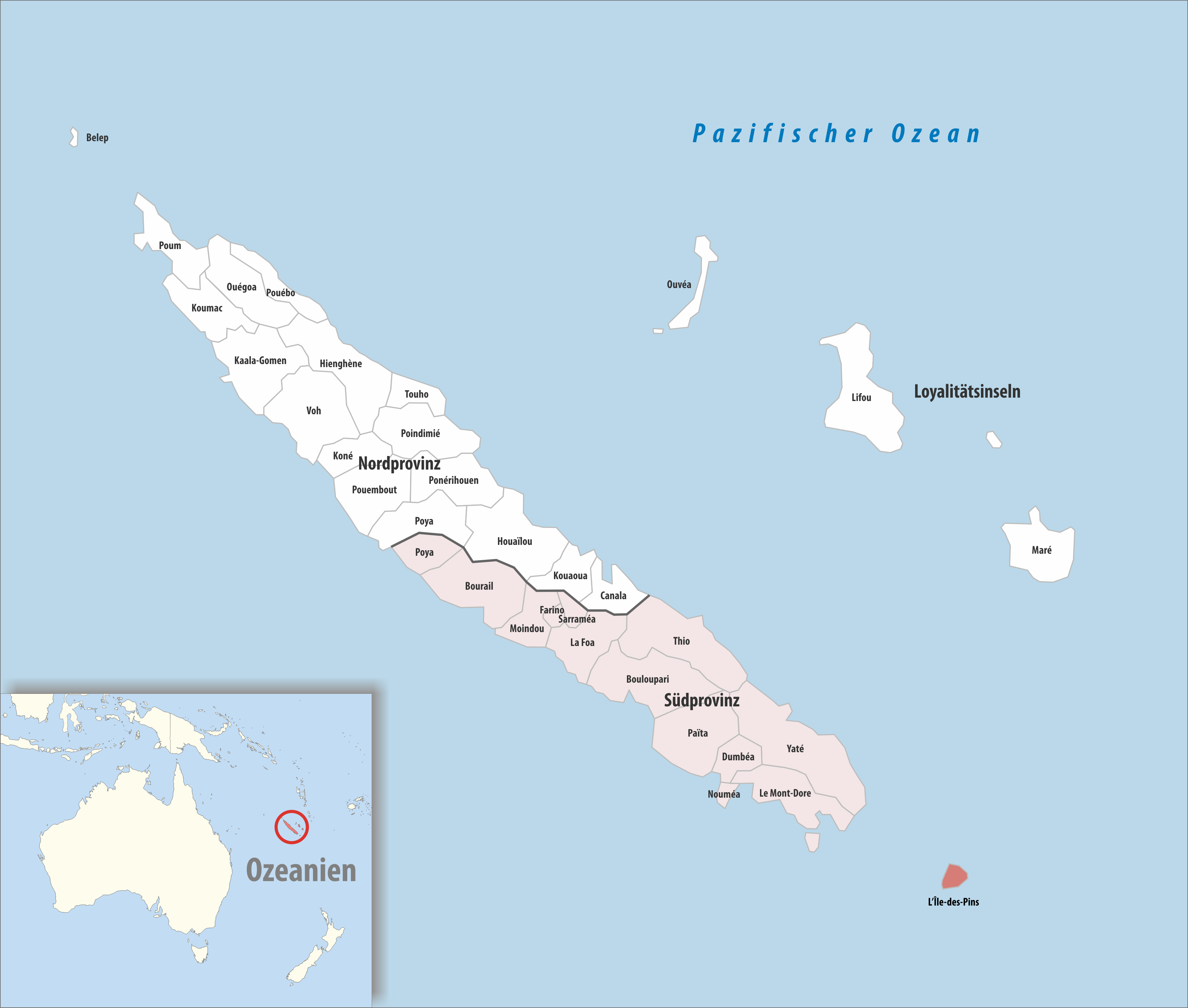
- Location of the commune (in red) within New Caledonia
- Location of Isle of Pines
- Coordinates: 22°37′00″S 167°29′00″E
- Country: France
- Sui generis collectivity: New Caledonia
- Province: South Province

Government
  - Mayor (2020–2026): Christophe Vakié
- Area^{1}: 152.3 km^{2} (58.8 sq mi)
- Elevation: 20 m (66 ft)
- Highest elevation: 262 m (860 ft)
- Lowest elevation: 0 m (0 ft)
- Population (2019 census): 2,037
  - Density: 13.37/km^{2} (34.64/sq mi)

Ethnic distribution
  - 2019 census: Kanaks 93.96% Europeans 2.65% Wallisians and Futunans 0.44% Mixed 1.77% Other 1.18%
- Time zone: UTC+11:00
- INSEE/Postal code: 98809 /98832
- ^{1} New Caledonia Land Register (DITTT) data, which exclude lakes and ponds larger than 1 km² (0.386 sq mi or 247 acres) as well as the estuaries of rivers.

The Isle of Pines (French: L'Île-des-Pins, pronounced [lil de pɛ̃]; Numèè: Kwényi, Dehu: Kunie) is a commune in the South Province of New Caledonia, an overseas territory of France in the Pacific Ocean. L'Île-des-Pins is made up of the Isle of Pines, the smaller Kôtomo Island, and several islets around these two, as well as the distant island of Walpole, which is located almost 150 kilometres (80 nautical miles) to the east. The Isle of Pines and adjacent islands are located to the south of New Caledonia's mainland. At 16,830 km from Paris, L'Île-des-Pins is further from the French capital than any other commune of France. The settlement of Vao, on the Isle of Pines, is the administrative centre of the commune of the Isle of Pines.

The Isle of Pines is one of the main tourist attractions in New Caledonia. The Isle of Pines itself is nicknamed l'île la plus proche du paradis ("the closest island to Paradise"). The island can be reached by boat or plane from Nouméa, the capital of New Caledonia. It is renowned for the intense blue colours of its waters and for the ancient pine tree groves spread throughout the Isle of Pines and the neighboring islands.

After the Paris Commune (1871), about 2,800 Parisian insurgents were deported to the Isle of Pines, a part of whose territory was turned into a penal settlement where the convicts lived for several years.

In 2005, the Isle of Pines gained attention when season 5 of French reality show Les Aventuriers de Koh-Lanta ("The Adventurers of Koh Lanta"), the French version of Survivor, was set on several small islands off the Isle of Pines.
