= Menaku =

- Village
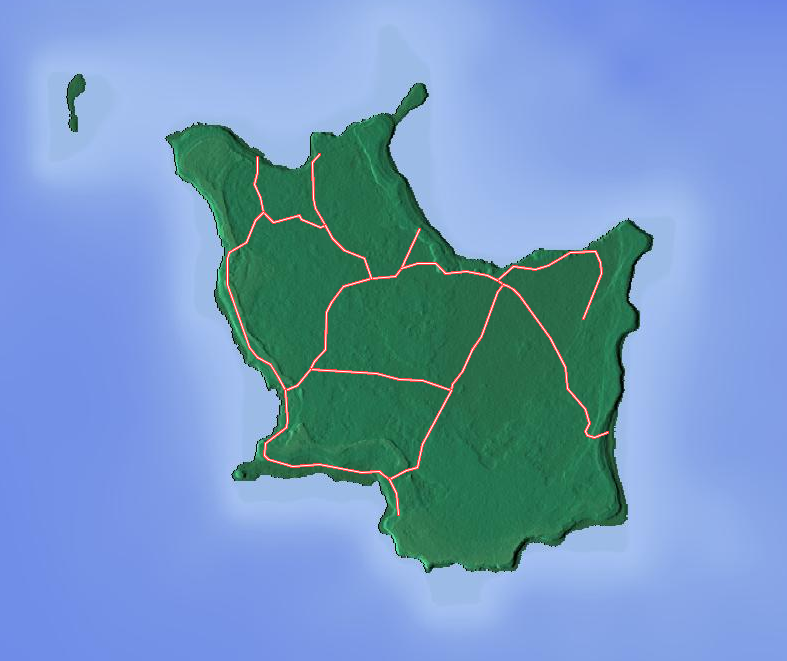
- Location in Maré Island
- Coordinates: 21°26′37″S 167°58′3″E
- Territory: New Caledonia, France
- Province: Loyalty Islands Province
- Commune: Maré
- Time zone: UTC+11

Menaku is a village in the northeast of Maré Island, in the Loyalty Islands of New Caledonia. It lies south by road from Kaewatine and northwest of the main town of La Roche. It lies 27 kilometres from Tadine and as of 1996 had a population of 127 people. The Grand-Chief is Naisseline Henri Yé Nidoish, the Chief is Cuéwapur Cuki and the President of the Council is Wakana Kadéne. The main language spoken by the inhabitants is the indigenous Nengoné language and the French language.
