= Padawa =

Padawan
- Village
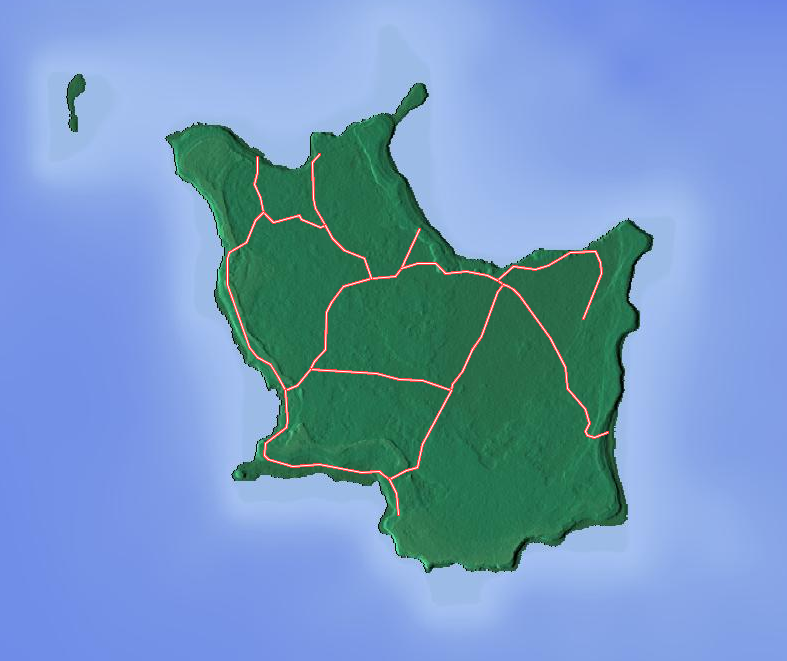
- Location in Maré Island
- Coordinates: 21°27′38″S 167°50′23″E
- Territory: New Caledonia, France
- Province: Loyalty Islands Province
- Commune: Maré
- Time zone: UTC+11

Padawa is a village on the northwestern coast of Maré Island, in the Loyalty Islands of New Caledonia. It lies southwest by road from Hnawayaca and north of Nece.
