= Wé =

Human settlement in France

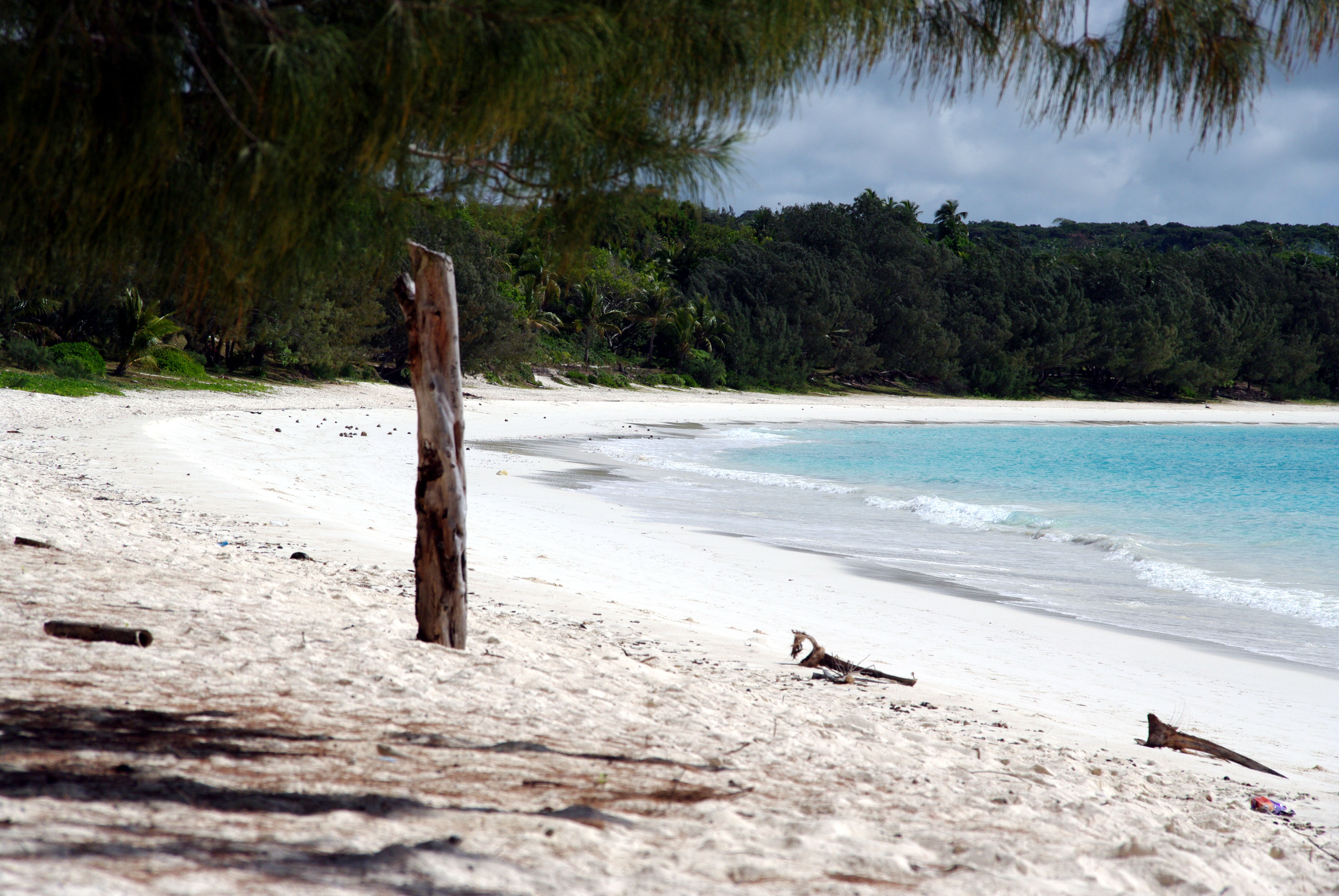

- Location within New Caledonia
- Country: New Caledonia
- Province: Loyalty Islands
- Commune: Lifou

Wé is a small town in the commune of Lifou, in the Loyalty Islands Province, New Caledonia. It is located on the east coast of Lifou Island. Wé is the administrative centre of the commune of Lifou as well as the location of the provincial assembly of the Loyalty Islands. The population of Wé is unknown but the island of Lifou, of which Wé is the capital, has a population of 9,195 in 2019.
