= Kôtomo Island =

Island of New Caledonia

Coordinates: 22°39′47″S 167°31′41″E

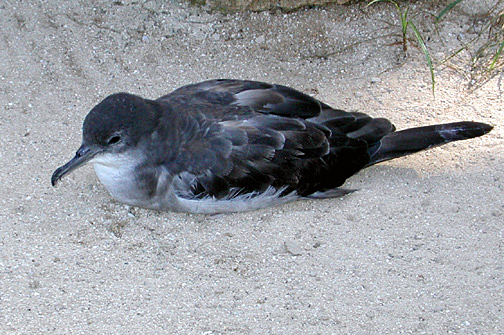
Wedge-tailed shearwaters nest on the island

Kôtomo Island is a small island off the Isle of Pines, New Caledonia. It is also spelled as Koutomo, Kutomo, Koutoumo, or Kutumo.

== Important Bird Area ==
A 440 ha tract encompassing the southern part of the island has been recognised as an Important Bird Area (IBA) by BirdLife International because it supports a breeding colony of some 38,000 pairs of wedge-tailed shearwaters.
