= Thogone =

- Village
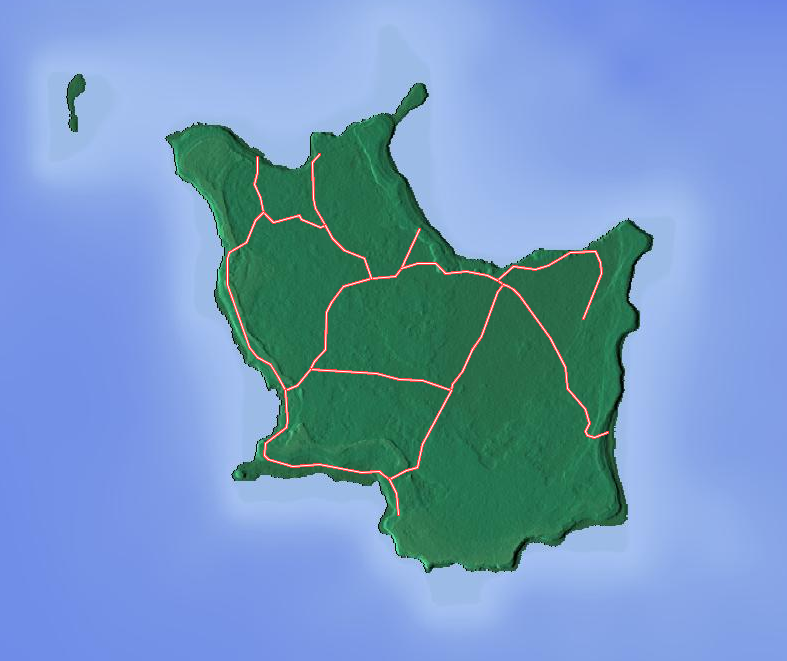
- Location in Maré Island Thogone (New Caledonia)
- Coordinates: 21°23′54″S 167°54′3″E
- Territory: New Caledonia, France
- Province: Loyalty Islands Province
- Commune: Maré
- Time zone: UTC+11

Thogone, also Thogoon, is a village on the north coast of Maré Island, in the Loyalty Islands of New Caledonia. It overlooks Nord Bay, just to the northeast of Tenane. On the road to Thogone is Tru de Bone, a deep rock cavity and tropical garden and pool.
