= Poindimié =

Commune of New Caledonia

- Commune
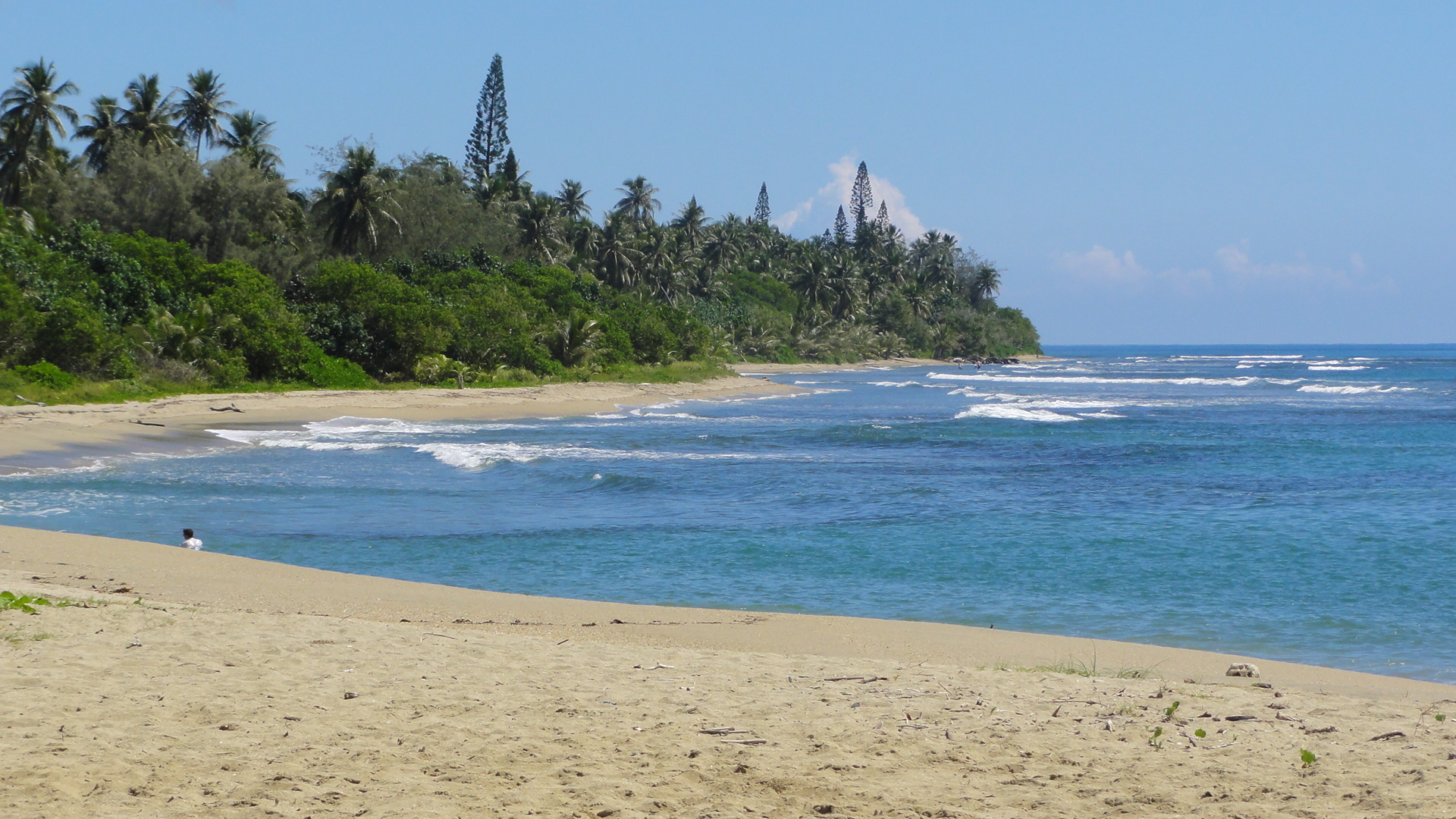
- Poindimié Beach

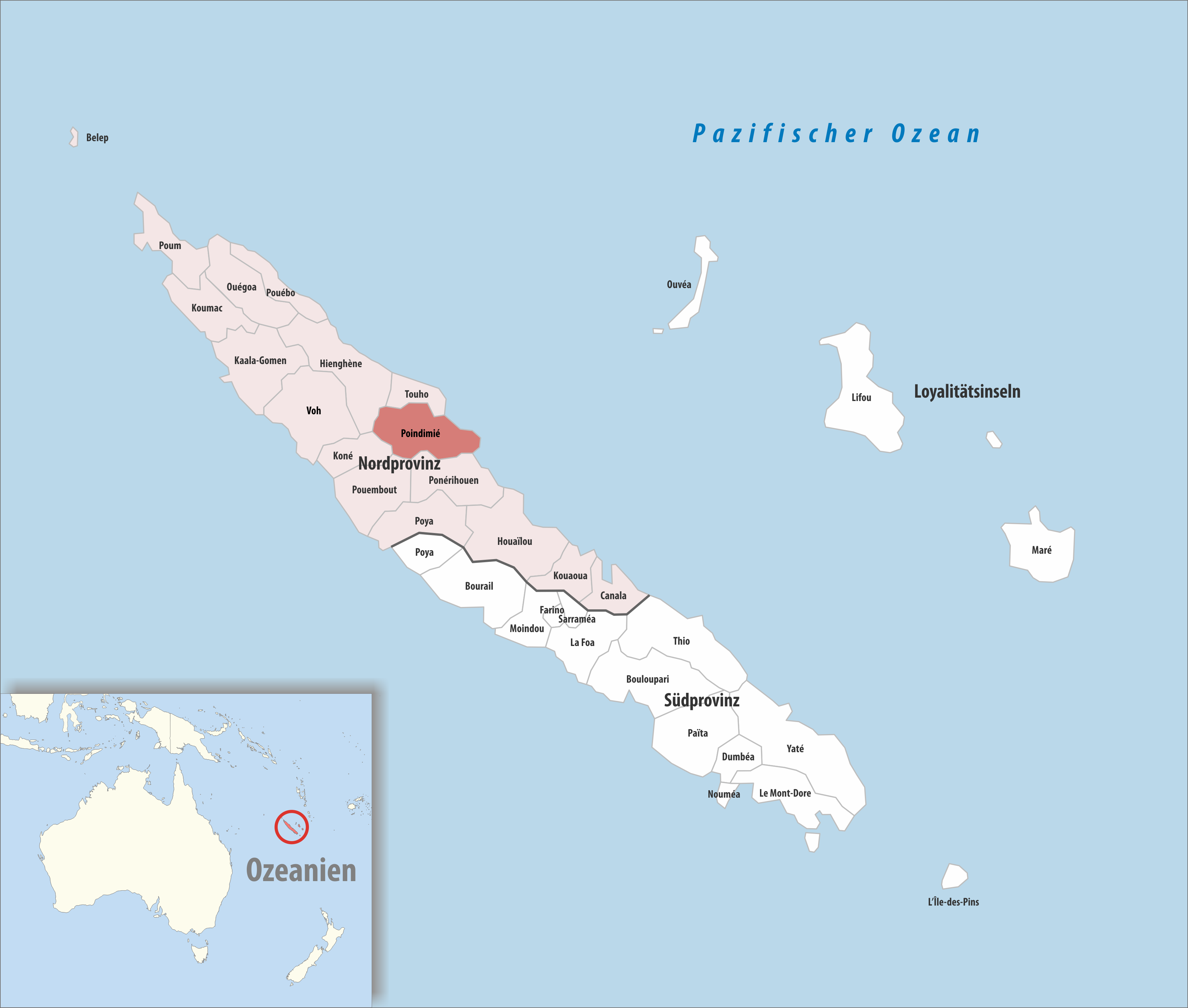
- Location of the commune (in red) within New Caledonia
- Location of Poindimié
- Coordinates: 20°56′59″S 165°19′45″E
- Country: France
- Sui generis collectivity: New Caledonia
- Province: North Province

Government
  - Mayor (2020–2026): Paul Néaoutyine
- Area^{1}: 673.1 km^{2} (259.9 sq mi)
- Elevation: 10 m (33 ft)
- Highest elevation: 1,385 m (4,544 ft)
- Lowest elevation: 0 m (0 ft)
- Population (2019 census): 5,006
  - Density: 7.437/km^{2} (19.26/sq mi)

Ethnic distribution
  - 2019 census: Kanaks 77.73% Europeans 7.93% Wallisians and Futunans 0.34% Mixed 9.17% Other 4.83%
- Time zone: UTC+11:00
- INSEE/Postal code: 98822 /98822
- ^{1} New Caledonia Land Register (DITTT) data, which exclude lakes and ponds larger than 1 km² (0.386 sq mi or 247 acres) as well as the estuaries of rivers.

Poindimié (French: [pwɛ̃dimje], Paicî: Pwêêdi Wiimîâ) is a commune in the North Province of New Caledonia, an overseas territory of France in the Pacific Ocean. The Poindimié Islands, a group of seven tiny islets where seabirds and sea turtles nest, lies off the coast of the commune.

== Climate ==
Poindimié has a trade-wind tropical rainforest climate (Köppen Af). Although there is no dry season, rainfall does show a strong peak in the late southern summer, and a minimum from August to October.

Climate data for Poindimié (1991−2020 normals, extremes 1964−present)
Month	Jan	Feb	Mar	Apr	May	Jun	Jul	Aug	Sep	Oct	Nov	Dec	Year
Record high °C (°F)	33.8 (92.8)	34.2 (93.6)	34.4 (93.9)	32.8 (91.0)	31.2 (88.2)	30.2 (86.4)	29.0 (84.2)	30.3 (86.5)	32.1 (89.8)	31.0 (87.8)	33.0 (91.4)	33.3 (91.9)	34.4 (93.9)
Mean daily maximum °C (°F)	29.5 (85.1)	29.9 (85.8)	29.5 (85.1)	28.4 (83.1)	26.9 (80.4)	25.5 (77.9)	24.8 (76.6)	24.7 (76.5)	25.6 (78.1)	26.5 (79.7)	27.5 (81.5)	28.6 (83.5)	27.3 (81.1)
Daily mean °C (°F)	26.4 (79.5)	26.8 (80.2)	26.5 (79.7)	25.3 (77.5)	23.6 (74.5)	22.2 (72.0)	21.2 (70.2)	21.1 (70.0)	22.0 (71.6)	23.1 (73.6)	24.2 (75.6)	25.5 (77.9)	24.0 (75.2)
Mean daily minimum °C (°F)	23.3 (73.9)	23.7 (74.7)	23.4 (74.1)	22.1 (71.8)	20.3 (68.5)	18.9 (66.0)	17.6 (63.7)	17.5 (63.5)	18.4 (65.1)	19.7 (67.5)	21.0 (69.8)	22.4 (72.3)	20.7 (69.3)
Record low °C (°F)	17.6 (63.7)	17.9 (64.2)	16.2 (61.2)	15.8 (60.4)	13.5 (56.3)	12.5 (54.5)	11.2 (52.2)	11.0 (51.8)	12.5 (54.5)	12.5 (54.5)	13.1 (55.6)	14.8 (58.6)	11.0 (51.8)
Average precipitation mm (inches)	313.2 (12.33)	326.2 (12.84)	395.8 (15.58)	258.5 (10.18)	194.6 (7.66)	155.6 (6.13)	116.0 (4.57)	101.4 (3.99)	102.7 (4.04)	96.8 (3.81)	144.7 (5.70)	221.1 (8.70)	2,426.6 (95.54)
Average precipitation days (≥ 1.0 mm)	17.9	18.6	19.9	16.6	13.9	11.0	9.2	8.4	8.4	11.0	12.1	16.3	163.4
Mean monthly sunshine hours	186.9	158.8	163.5	165.3	153.1	148.2	174.3	186.6	195.5	207.9	186.3	192.0	2,118.2
Source 1: Météo-France
Source 2: Service de la météorologie de la Nouvelle-Calédonie
