= Poindimié Islands =

Islands of New Caledonia

Coordinates: 20°55′00″S 165°30′00″E

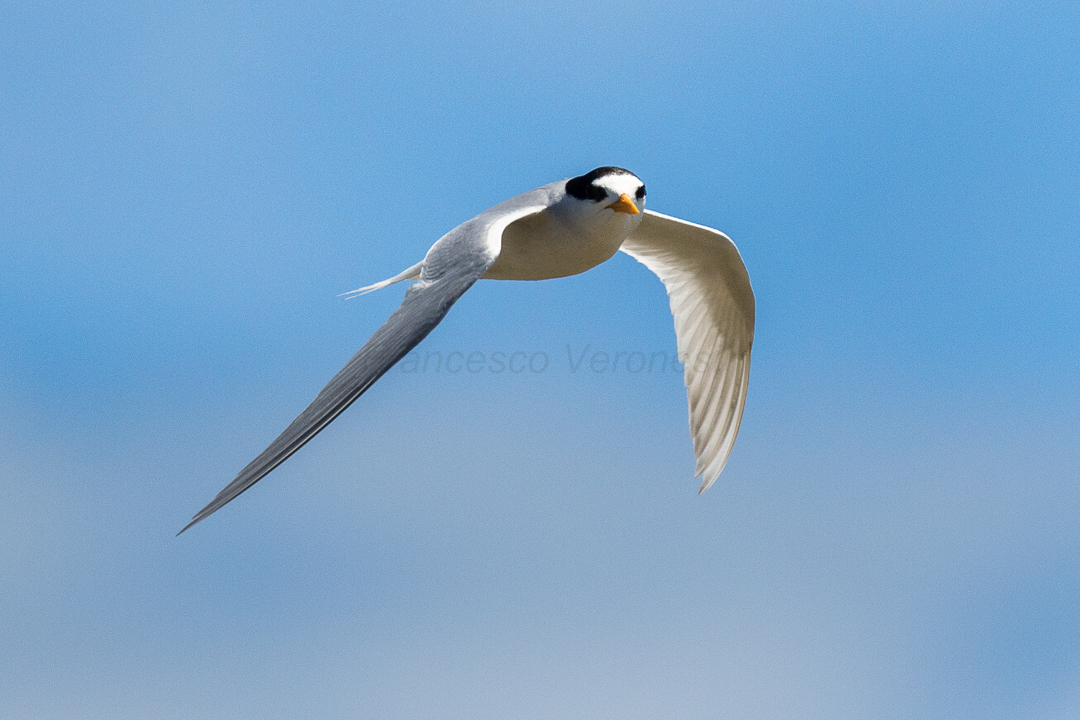
Fairy terns nest on the islets

The Poindimié Islands are a group of seven tiny islets, with a collective area of about 3 ha, lying some 10–12 km off the north-eastern coast of Grande Terre, the principal island of the French Territory of New Caledonia in Melanesia in the south-west Pacific Ocean. They are formed of small banks of sand and dead coral, with little vegetation, and provide nesting sites for seabirds and sea turtles.

== Important Bird Area ==
The group has been recognised as an Important Bird Area (IBA) by BirdLife International because it supports breeding colonies of fairy and roseate terns.
