= Roh, Maré =

Roh
- Village
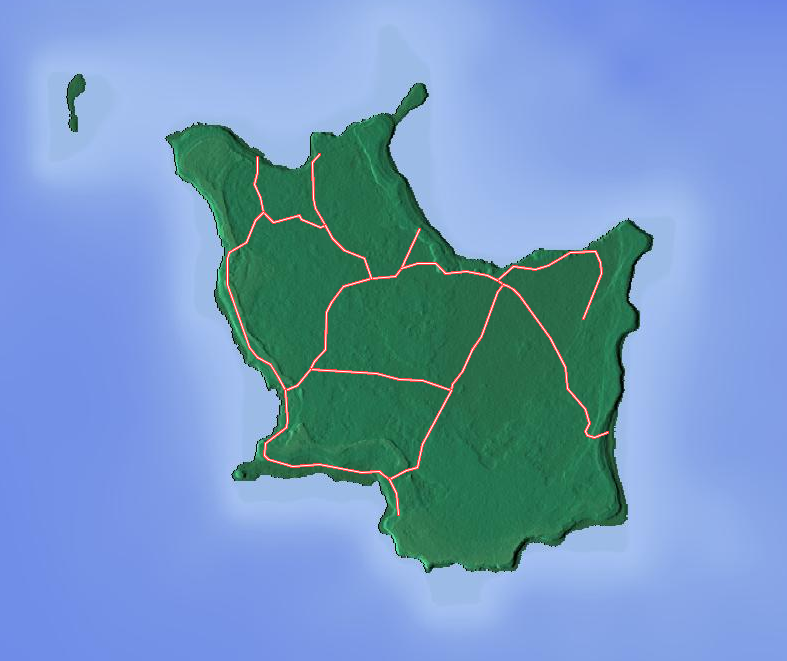
- Location in Maré Island
- Coordinates: 21°23′9″S 167°51′21″E
- Territory: New Caledonia, France
- Province: Loyalty Islands Province
- Commune: Maré
- Time zone: UTC+11

Roh, also Ro, is a village on the north coast of Maré Island, in the Loyalty Islands of New Caledonia. It overlooks Nord Bay.
