= Tenane =

- Village
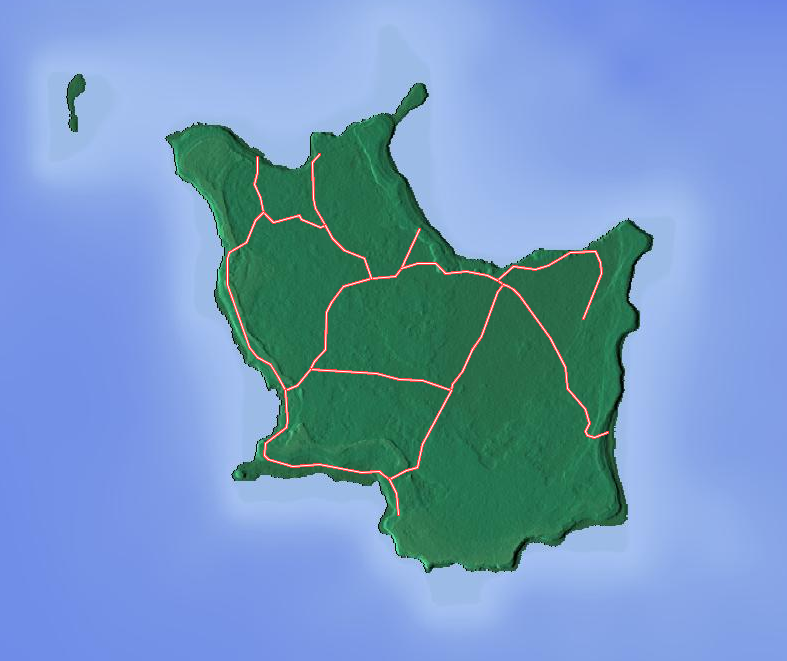
- Location in Maré Island Tenane (New Caledonia)
- Coordinates: 21°24′21″S 167°53′47″E
- Territory: New Caledonia, France
- Province: Loyalty Islands Province
- Commune: Maré
- Time zone: UTC+11

Tenane, also Tenan, is a village on the northern coast of Maré Island, in the Loyalty Islands of New Caledonia. It overlooks Nord Bay, just to the southwest of Thogone.
