= Maré Island =

Commune of New Caledonia

Maré
- Commune
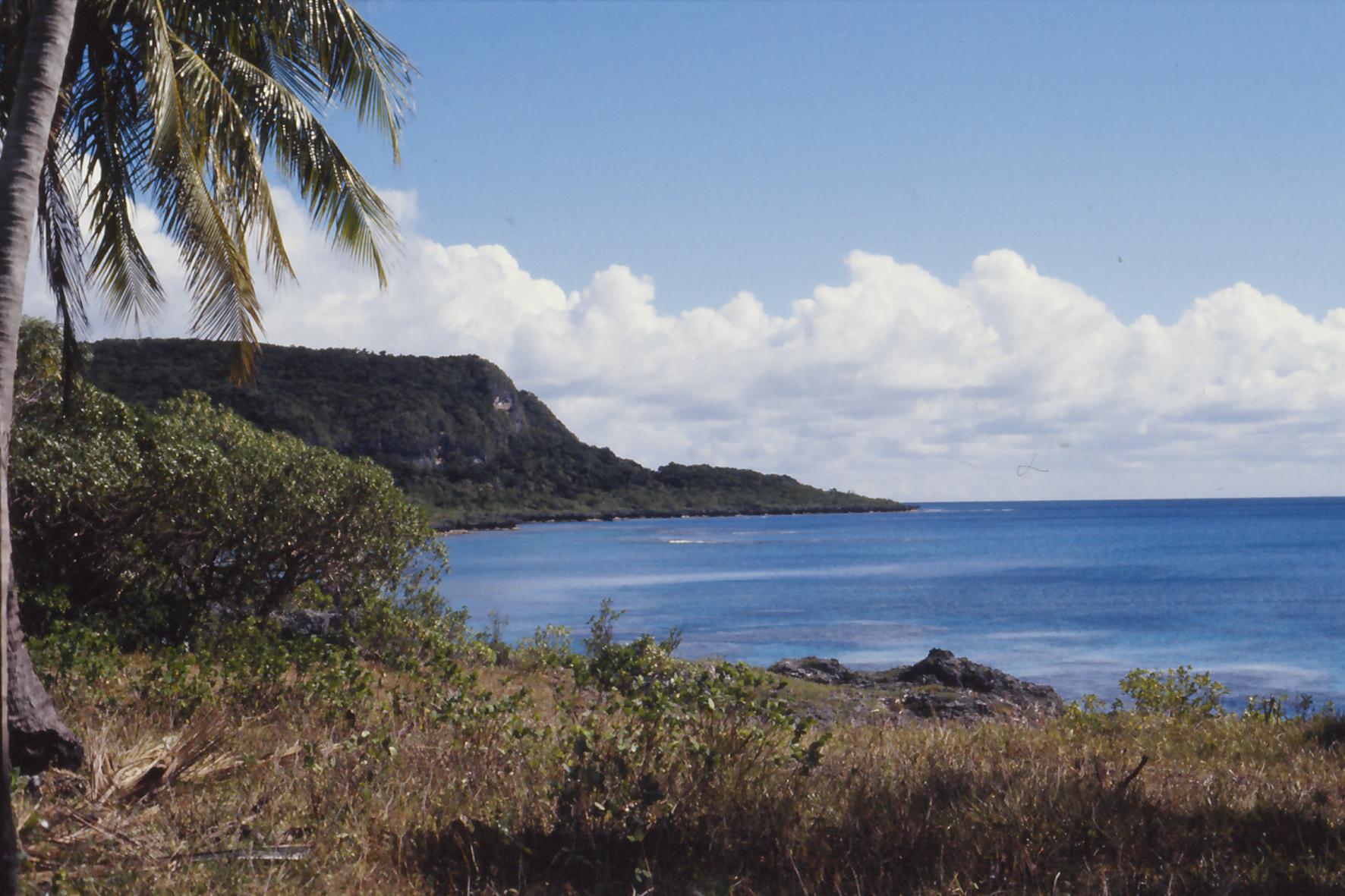
- Maré Beach

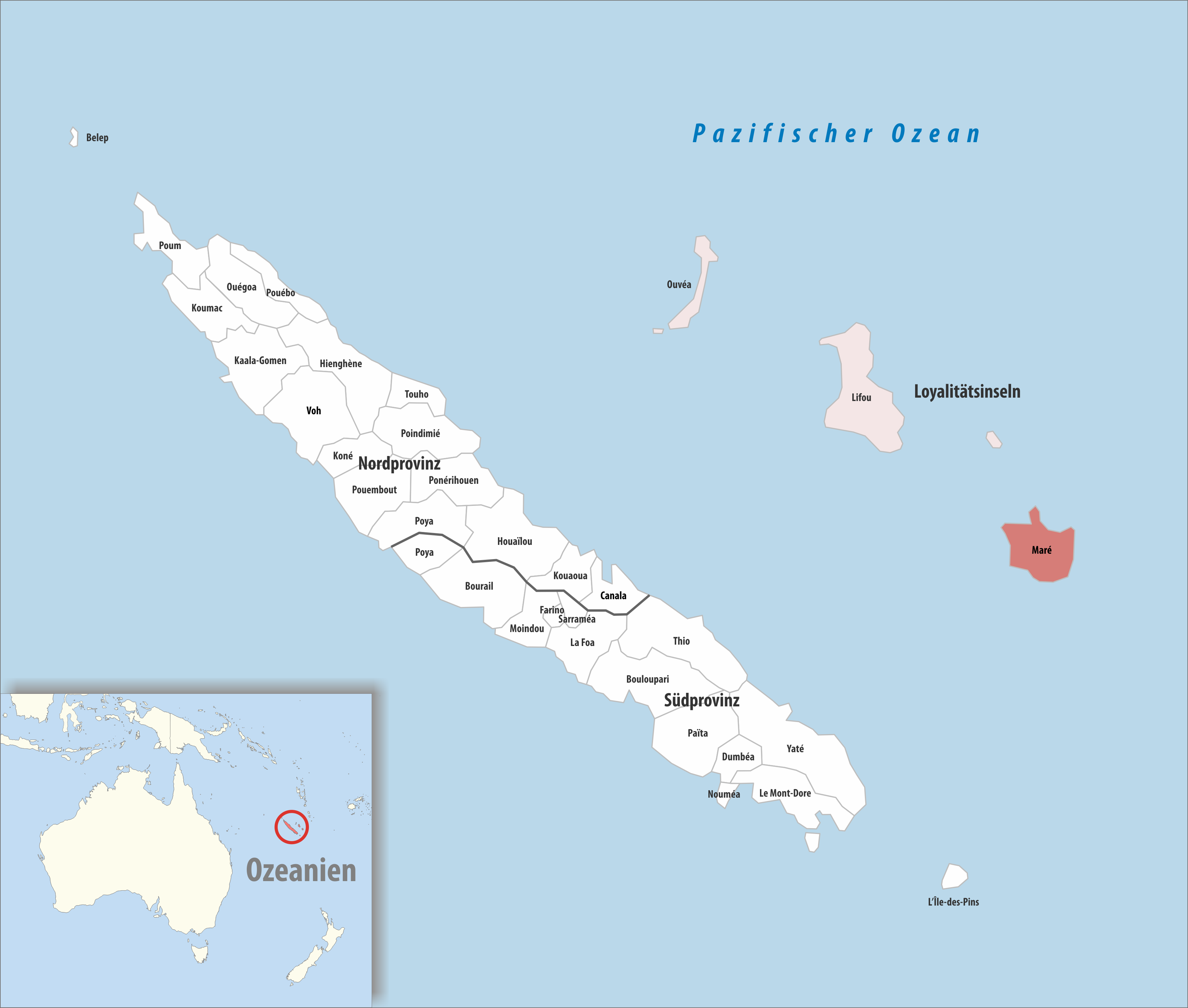
- Location of the commune (in red) within New Caledonia
- Location of Maré
- Coordinates: 21°31′00″S 167°59′00″E
- Country: France
- Sui generis collectivity: New Caledonia
- Province: Loyalty Islands Province

Government
  - Mayor (2020–2026): Marie-Lyne Sinewami
- Area^{1}: 641.7 km^{2} (247.8 sq mi)
- Elevation: 40 m (130 ft)
- Highest elevation: 138 m (453 ft)
- Lowest elevation: 0 m (0 ft)
- Population (2019 census): 5,757
  - Density: 8.971/km^{2} (23.24/sq mi)

Ethnic distribution
  - 2019 census: Kanaks 97.2% Europeans 1.01% Wallisians and Futunans 0.09% Mixed 1.27% Other 0.43%
- Time zone: UTC+11:00
- INSEE/Postal code: 98815 /98828
- ^{1} New Caledonia Land Register (DITTT) data, which exclude lakes and ponds larger than 1 km² (0.386 sq mi or 247 acres) as well as the estuaries of rivers.

Maré Island (French: Île de Maré, Nengone: Nengone, Dehu: Mengone) is the second-largest of the Loyalty Islands, in the archipelago of New Caledonia, an overseas territory of France in the Pacific Ocean. The island is part of the commune (municipality) of Maré, in the Loyalty Islands Province of New Caledonia.

== Geography ==
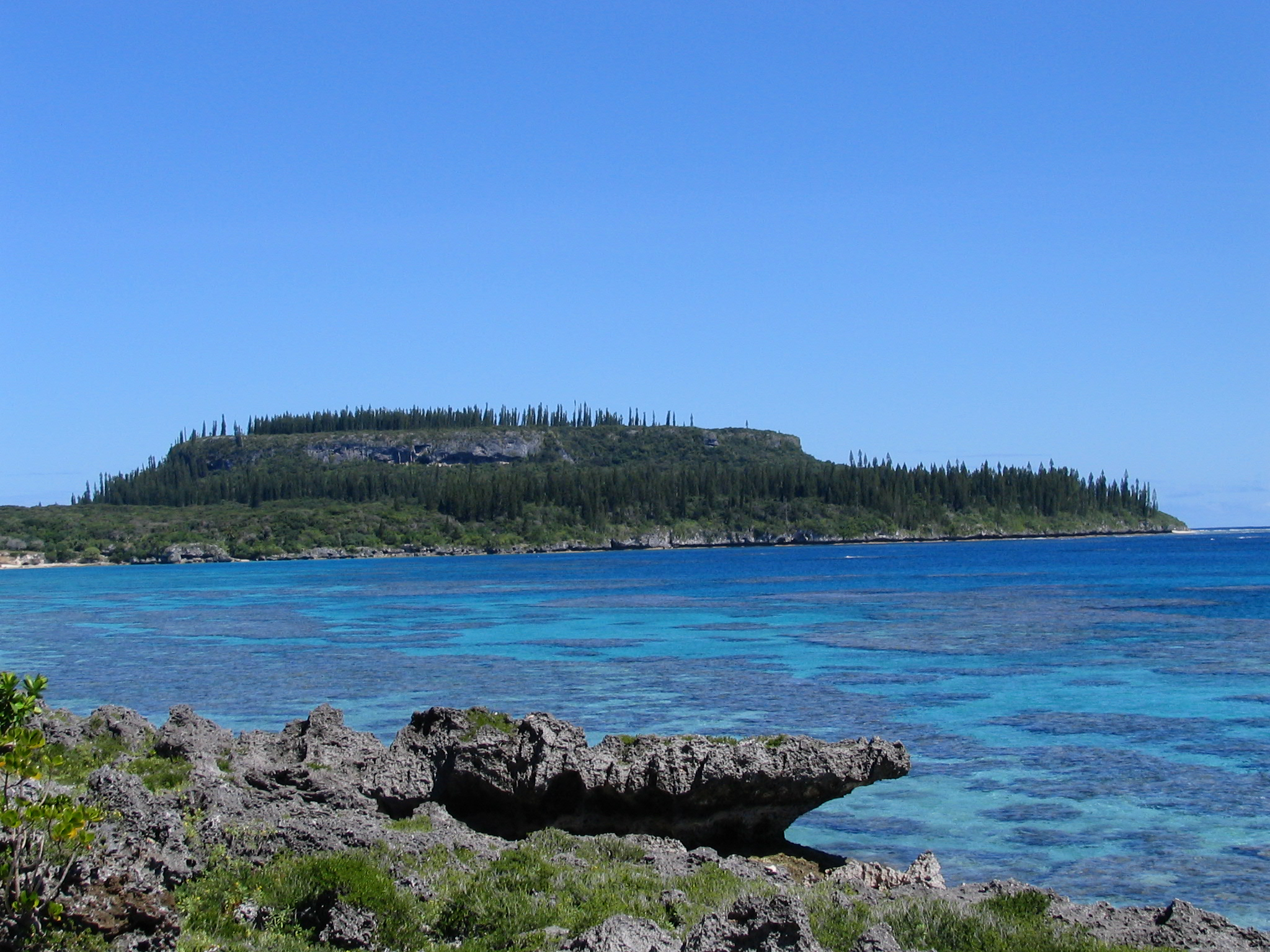
Cap Wabao on Maré, showing the rough coral rock (foreground) and narrow fringing reef. The high, flat peak of Cap Wabao in the background is a former reef islet. The characteristic Araucaria trees cover most flat land near the sea.

The island is 42 km (26 mi) long and 16 to 33 km (9.9 to 20.5 mi) wide. It lies northeast of Grande Terre, New Caledonia's mainland. Like its neighbor to the north Lifou, Maré is a raised coral atoll, a former atoll that has been lifted about 120 meters. The interior of the island is the former lagoon, surrounded by a rim of higher land that was the ring of reef islets. Its fossil coral rock is honeycombed with caves, pools, and pits of all sizes, whose sharp edges make for difficult walking. Because of the lifting, the current shoreline is relatively recent and supports only short sections of nearshore fringing reef, unlike the extensive barrier reef found on the main island of New Caledonia, Grande Terre. The narrow beaches of Maré are often backed by cliffs.

Villages include, from north-southwards, Roh, Thogone, Kaewatine, Tenane, Hnawayaca, Wakuaori, Menaku, Padawa, Kaewaura, Pakada, Atha, Tadurehmu, Nece, La Roche, Tuo, Miramas, Wakone, Hanadid, Rawa, Tawainedr, Mebuet, Tadine, Cuaden, Cengeite, Penelo, Patho, Wabao, Medu, Kurin, and Eni.

=== Climate ===
Maré Island has a tropical rainforest climate (Köppen Af). The average annual temperature in Maré Island is 22.4 °C (72.3 °F). The average annual rainfall is 1,669.9 mm (65.74 in) with March as the wettest month. The temperatures are highest on average in February, at around 26.0 °C (78.8 °F), and lowest in August, at around 18.9 °C (66.0 °F). The highest temperature ever recorded in Maré Island was 35.0 °C (95.0 °F) on 13 February 2016; the coldest temperature ever recorded was 2.8 °C (37.0 °F) on 27 August 1979.

Climate data for Maré Island (La Roche, 1991−2020 normals, extremes 1970−present)
Month	Jan	Feb	Mar	Apr	May	Jun	Jul	Aug	Sep	Oct	Nov	Dec	Year
Record high °C (°F)	33.5 (92.3)	35.0 (95.0)	34.2 (93.6)	33.1 (91.6)	32.8 (91.0)	32.2 (90.0)	29.2 (84.6)	29.1 (84.4)	30.1 (86.2)	32.0 (89.6)	32.9 (91.2)	32.0 (89.6)	35.0 (95.0)
Mean daily maximum °C (°F)	29.4 (84.9)	29.8 (85.6)	29.0 (84.2)	27.8 (82.0)	26.1 (79.0)	24.8 (76.6)	24.0 (75.2)	24.0 (75.2)	25.0 (77.0)	26.1 (79.0)	27.3 (81.1)	28.6 (83.5)	26.8 (80.2)
Daily mean °C (°F)	25.4 (77.7)	26.0 (78.8)	25.5 (77.9)	24.1 (75.4)	21.8 (71.2)	20.5 (68.9)	19.2 (66.6)	18.9 (66.0)	19.7 (67.5)	21.1 (70.0)	22.6 (72.7)	24.3 (75.7)	22.4 (72.3)
Mean daily minimum °C (°F)	21.4 (70.5)	22.2 (72.0)	22.0 (71.6)	20.3 (68.5)	17.5 (63.5)	16.1 (61.0)	14.4 (57.9)	13.8 (56.8)	14.4 (57.9)	16.2 (61.2)	18.0 (64.4)	20.0 (68.0)	18.0 (64.4)
Record low °C (°F)	12.5 (54.5)	12.5 (54.5)	11.6 (52.9)	9.6 (49.3)	6.9 (44.4)	6.5 (43.7)	4.3 (39.7)	2.8 (37.0)	4.1 (39.4)	5.4 (41.7)	8.8 (47.8)	9.5 (49.1)	2.8 (37.0)
Average rainfall mm (inches)	189.9 (7.48)	194.8 (7.67)	243.3 (9.58)	172.9 (6.81)	162.8 (6.41)	123.1 (4.85)	104.3 (4.11)	82.7 (3.26)	74.3 (2.93)	91.8 (3.61)	89.0 (3.50)	141.0 (5.55)	1,669.9 (65.74)
Average rainy days (≥ 1.0 mm)	12.0	12.5	15.5	12.7	11.9	11.1	9.5	8.1	7.2	7.4	7.6	10.1	125.6
Source: Météo-France

== Commune ==
The commune of Maré is made up of Maré Island and the much smaller Dudune Island, which lie among the Loyalty Islands, to the northeast of New Caledonia's mainland. The settlement of Tadin, on Maré Island, is the administrative centre of the commune of Maré.

== People ==
The population of Maré is about 6,900, of mainly Melanesian heritage (less than 2% of the population is of European ancestry). The indigenous language is Nengone, one of the Austronesian languages, widely spoken in island regions from Madagascar to Indonesia, coastal New Guinea and on most Pacific islands. There are two small towns of Tadine and La Roche, but most Maréans live in tribes associated with one of 29 chieftaincies (chefferie), that are closed to outsiders. Maréans are often fervent Christians, following extensive missionary activity by the competing Protestant (London Missionary Society) and Catholic (Marist) churches during the late 19th century. Sectarian hostility has led to episodic intertribal violence over the years.

Maré has produced several important leaders of the militant Front de Libération Nationale Kanak Socialiste (Kanak Socialist National Liberation Front, or FLNKS), which seeks independence from France. The Front was founded by a former grand chief of Maré, Nidoish Naisseline around 1970. Another Maréan, Yeiwene Yeiwene, was deputy to the Front's leader Jean-Marie Tjibaou during the violence of the early 1980s and the signing of the Matignon Accords on 26 June 1988 that brought peace. Seen as traitors by militant elements of the FLNKS, Tjibaou and Yeiwene were assassinated on the island of Ouvea on 4 May 1989. The gravesite of Yeiwene by the sea near Tadine on the west coast of Maré is maintained with often-renewed flower garlands.

== European sighting ==
The first recorded sighting of Maré Island by a European occurred around August 1793. William Raven, master of Britannia was sailing to Batavia from Sydney, to procure provisions for the penal colony there.
