= N-methyltransferase =

N-methyltransferase may refer to:

- (RS)-1-benzyl-1,2,3,4-tetrahydroisoquinoline N-methyltransferase
- 3-hydroxy-16-methoxy-2,3-dihydrotabersonine N-methyltransferase
- Amine N-methyltransferase
- Anthranilate N-methyltransferase
- (cytochrome c)-arginine N-methyltransferase
- (Myelin basic protein)-arginine N-methyltransferase
- Calmodulin-lysine N-methyltransferase
- Carnosine N-methyltransferase
- (S)-coclaurine-N-methyltransferase
- Dimethylhistidine N-methyltransferase
- Glycine N-methyltransferase
- Guanidinoacetate N-methyltransferase
- Histamine N-methyltransferase
- Histone methyltransferase
- (cytochrome c)-lysine N-methyltransferase
- (Ribulose-bisphosphate carboxylase)-lysine N-methyltransferase
- Methylamine—glutamate N-methyltransferase
- Nicotinamide N-methyltransferase
- Nicotinate N-methyltransferase
- Phenylethanolamine N-methyltransferase
- Phosphatidylethanolamine N-methyltransferase
- Phosphatidyl-N-methylethanolamine N-methyltransferase
- Phosphoethanolamine N-methyltransferase
- Protein-histidine N-methyltransferase
- Putrescine N-methyltransferase
- Pyridine N-methyltransferase
- (S)-tetrahydroprotoberberine N-methyltransferase
- Trimethylsulfonium—tetrahydrofolate N-methyltransferase
- Tyramine N-methyltransferase
