= C13H9N =

The molecular formula C_{13}H_{9}N (molar mass: 179.22 g/mol, exact mass: 179.0735 u) may refer to:

- Acridine
- Azaanthracene
- Phenanthridine
