= Sarcomelicope glauca =

Conservation status
- Critically Endangered (IUCN 3.1)

Scientific classification
- Kingdom: Plantae
- Clade: Tracheophytes
- Clade: Angiosperms
- Clade: Eudicots
- Clade: Rosids
- Order: Sapindales
- Family: Rutaceae
- Genus: Sarcomelicope
- Species: S. glauca

Binomial name
- Sarcomelicope glauca T.G.Hartley

Species of flowering plant

Sarcomelicope glauca is a species of plant in the family Rutaceae. It is endemic to New Caledonia, mainly on the Isle of Pines at the southern tip of New Caledonia. As with other Sarcomelicope species, S. glauca is widely regarded for its unique alkaloids.

== Description ==
S. glauca grows as shrubs on ultramafic substrate up to 200 metres (660 ft) above sea level. Sarcomelicope species in general can be regarded as having leaves opposite or whorled, with inflorescences patterned as axillary, paniculate or apparently racemose, with its flowers being functionally unisexual. The fruits are a drupe, consisting of 4 completely fused or basally fused carpels, with its seeds being dull to shiny, and colored dark brown to black.

It is only known primarily from one locality on the Isle of Pines (Ile des Pins), with its area of occupancy (AOO) and extent of occurrence (EOO) are both equal to 4 square kilometres (990 acres). S. glauca is the only Sarcomelicope in the isle, as originally described in 1982. In general, S. glauca grows in wet tropical biomes.

== Biochemical profile ==
S. glauca, together with other Sarcomelicope species, is widely researched for its novel alkaloids. In 1986, a new furoquilonine alkaloid was extracted from S. glauca, 7-hydroxy-8-(3-methyl-2-butenyl)-4-methoxyfuro[2,3b]quinoline, together with two acridone alkaloids, from its leaves and bark, respectively, together with other various alkaloids, with acronine being its main secondary metabolite in the bark. Other notable alkaloids extracted include dictamnine, evolitrine, haplopine, kokusaginine, and skimmianine. The alkaloids were later on discovered having a moderate antimalarial property against Plasmodium falciparum.
