= Gnaphalopoda spinicollis =

Scientific classification
- Kingdom: Animalia
- Phylum: Arthropoda
- Clade: Pancrustacea
- Class: Insecta
- Order: Coleoptera
- Suborder: Polyphaga
- Infraorder: Scarabaeiformia
- Family: Scarabaeidae
- Genus: Gnaphalopoda
- Species: G. spinicollis

Binomial name
- Gnaphalopoda spinicollis (Blackburn, 1892)

Synonyms
- Ocnodus spinicollis Blackburn, 1892

Species of beetle

Gnaphalopoda spinicollis is a species of beetle of the family Scarabaeidae. It is found in Australia (Western Australia, Northern Territory).

== Description ==
Adults reach a length of about 10 mm (0.39 in). They are dark reddish brown and very similar to Gnaphalopoda biloba, but the punctuation of the disc of the pronotum is less dense.
