= Gnaphalopoda tridentata =

Scientific classification
- Kingdom: Animalia
- Phylum: Arthropoda
- Clade: Pancrustacea
- Class: Insecta
- Order: Coleoptera
- Suborder: Polyphaga
- Infraorder: Scarabaeiformia
- Family: Scarabaeidae
- Genus: Gnaphalopoda
- Species: G. tridentata

Binomial name
- Gnaphalopoda tridentata (Lea, 1917)

Synonyms
- Ocnodus tridentatus Lea, 1917

Species of beetle

Gnaphalopoda tridentata is a species of beetle of the family Scarabaeidae. It is found in Australia (Western Australia, Northern Territory).

== Description ==
Adults reach a length of about 8 mm (0.31 in). They are dark reddish brown or piceous, with the clypeus, frons and pronotum punctured as in Gnaphalopoda scissiceps. The scutellum is densely punctured like the pronotum and the elytra have the punctures arranged in longitudinal rows. The pygidium is coarsely and irregularly punctured.
