= Gnaphalopoda baladica =

Scientific classification
- Kingdom: Animalia
- Phylum: Arthropoda
- Clade: Pancrustacea
- Class: Insecta
- Order: Coleoptera
- Suborder: Polyphaga
- Infraorder: Scarabaeiformia
- Family: Scarabaeidae
- Genus: Gnaphalopoda
- Species: G. baladica

Binomial name
- Gnaphalopoda baladica Fauvel, 1903

Species of beetle

Gnaphalopoda baladica is a species of beetle of the family Scarabaeidae. It is found in New Caledonia.

== Description ==
Adults reach a length of about 9–10 mm (0.35–0.39 in). They are similar to Gnaphalopoda seriata, but the clypeus is more densely punctate, as is the head between the eyes. The thorax is longer and narrower, twice as densely punctate. The elytra and pygidium are also about twice as densely punctate.
