= Gnaphalopoda lirella =

Scientific classification
- Kingdom: Animalia
- Phylum: Arthropoda
- Clade: Pancrustacea
- Class: Insecta
- Order: Coleoptera
- Suborder: Polyphaga
- Infraorder: Scarabaeiformia
- Family: Scarabaeidae
- Genus: Gnaphalopoda
- Species: G. lirella

Binomial name
- Gnaphalopoda lirella Britton, 1987

Species of beetle

Gnaphalopoda lirella is a species of beetle of the family Scarabaeidae. It is found in Australia (Northern Territory, South Australia).

== Description ==
They are very similar to Gnaphalopoda scissiceps, but the frons has a smooth, shining, unpunctured anterior margin, the scutellum is closely punctured at the base, but unpunctured and shining towards the apex and sides.
