= Gnaphalopoda ascia =

Scientific classification
- Kingdom: Animalia
- Phylum: Arthropoda
- Clade: Pancrustacea
- Class: Insecta
- Order: Coleoptera
- Suborder: Polyphaga
- Infraorder: Scarabaeiformia
- Family: Scarabaeidae
- Genus: Gnaphalopoda
- Species: G. ascia

Binomial name
- Gnaphalopoda ascia Britton, 1987

Species of beetle

Gnaphalopoda ascia is a species of beetle of the family Scarabaeidae. It is found in Australia (Western Australia, Northern Territory).

== Description ==
Adults reach a length of about 8–9 mm (0.31–0.35 in). They are very similar to Gnaphalopoda carnei, but the pronotum is more densely punctured and the pygidium has a median longitudinal depression instead of a ridge.
