= Gnaphalopoda proxima =

Scientific classification
- Kingdom: Animalia
- Phylum: Arthropoda
- Clade: Pancrustacea
- Class: Insecta
- Order: Coleoptera
- Suborder: Polyphaga
- Infraorder: Scarabaeiformia
- Family: Scarabaeidae
- Genus: Gnaphalopoda
- Species: G. proxima

Binomial name
- Gnaphalopoda proxima Britton, 1987

Species of beetle

Gnaphalopoda proxima is a species of beetle of the family Scarabaeidae. It is found in Australia (Western Australia, Northern Territory).

== Description ==
Adults reach a length of about 8–9 mm (0.31–0.35 in). They are very similar to Gnaphalopoda carnei, but the lateral edges of the clypeus are more rounded, and the punctuation of the pronotum is denser. Furthermore, there is no median longitudinal ridge on the pygidium and the form of the aedeagus differs.
