= Gnaphalopoda varians =

Scientific classification
- Kingdom: Animalia
- Phylum: Arthropoda
- Clade: Pancrustacea
- Class: Insecta
- Order: Coleoptera
- Suborder: Polyphaga
- Infraorder: Scarabaeiformia
- Family: Scarabaeidae
- Genus: Gnaphalopoda
- Species: G. varians

Binomial name
- Gnaphalopoda varians (Reiche, 1860)

Synonyms
- Rhisotrogus varians Reiche, 1860

Species of beetle

Gnaphalopoda varians is a species of beetle of the family Scarabaeidae. It is found in New Caledonia (Grande Terre, Belep Islands, Loyalty Islands, Isle of Pines).

== Description ==
Adults reach a length of about 11–14 mm (0.43–0.55 in). They have an elongated, oval, brownish-bronze body.
