= Protein methylase I =

Protein methylase I may refer to the following enzymes:

- Histone-arginine N-methyltransferase
- (Myelin basic protein)-arginine N-methyltransferase
