= C13H9NO =

The molecular formula C_{13}H_{9}NO (molar mass: 195.22 g/mol, exact mass: 195.0684 u) may refer to:

- Acridone
- CR gas, or dibenzoxazepine
