= Gnaphalopoda montrouzieri =

Scientific classification
- Kingdom: Animalia
- Phylum: Arthropoda
- Clade: Pancrustacea
- Class: Insecta
- Order: Coleoptera
- Suborder: Polyphaga
- Infraorder: Scarabaeiformia
- Family: Scarabaeidae
- Genus: Gnaphalopoda
- Species: G. montrouzieri

Binomial name
- Gnaphalopoda montrouzieri Paulian, 1991

Species of beetle

Gnaphalopoda montrouzieri is a species of beetle of the family Scarabaeidae. It is found in New Caledonia (Isle of Pines).

== Description ==
Adults reach a length of about 8.75 mm (0.344 in). They have an rather convex, elongated oval, shiny brownish-black body.
