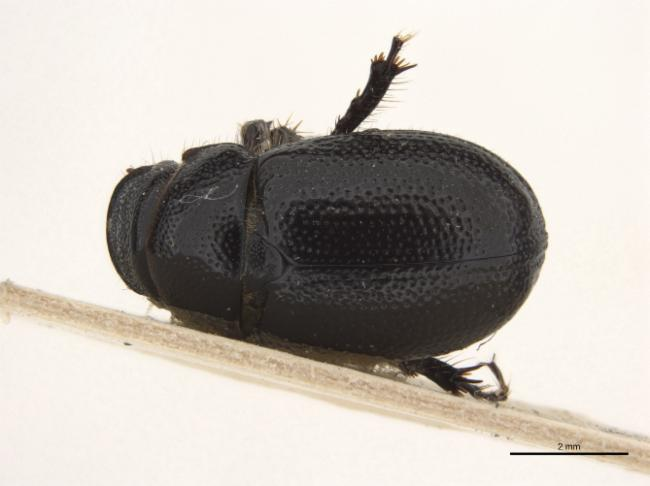

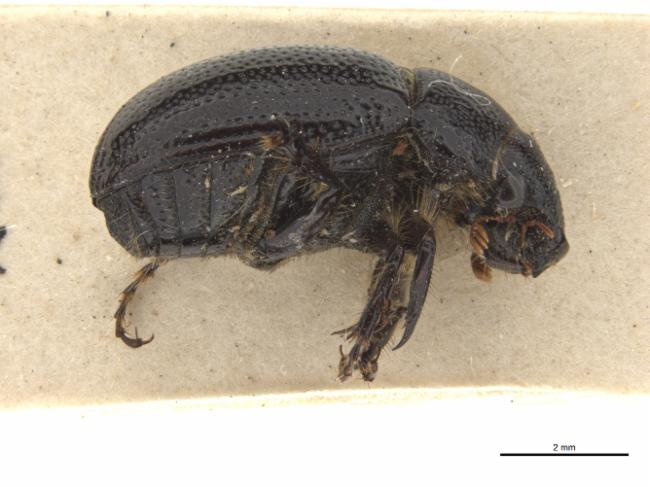

Scientific classification
- Kingdom: Animalia
- Phylum: Arthropoda
- Clade: Pancrustacea
- Class: Insecta
- Order: Coleoptera
- Suborder: Polyphaga
- Infraorder: Scarabaeiformia
- Family: Scarabaeidae
- Genus: Gnaphalopoda
- Species: G. bidentata

Binomial name
- Gnaphalopoda bidentata (Lea, 1917)

Synonyms
- Ocnodus bidentatus Lea, 1917

= Gnaphalopoda bidentata =

Species of beetle

Gnaphalopoda bidentata is a species of beetle of the family Scarabaeidae. It is found in Australia (South Australia, Western Australia, Northern Territory).

== Description ==
Adults reach a length of about 7–9 mm (0.28–0.35 in). They are dark reddish brown. They are very similar to Gnaphalopoda unidentata.
