= Gnaphalopoda deslongchampsi =

Scientific classification
- Kingdom: Animalia
- Phylum: Arthropoda
- Clade: Pancrustacea
- Class: Insecta
- Order: Coleoptera
- Suborder: Polyphaga
- Infraorder: Scarabaeiformia
- Family: Scarabaeidae
- Genus: Gnaphalopoda
- Species: G. deslongchampsi

Binomial name
- Gnaphalopoda deslongchampsi Fauvel, 1862

Species of beetle

Gnaphalopoda deslongchampsi is a species of beetle of the family Scarabaeidae. It is found in New Caledonia (Grande Terre, Isle of Pines).

== Description ==
Adults reach a length of about 10–14 mm (0.39–0.55 in). They have a parallel, elongated, bronze-coloured body, which is shiny in males and pruinose in females.
