= Gnaphalopoda porcata =

Scientific classification
- Kingdom: Animalia
- Phylum: Arthropoda
- Clade: Pancrustacea
- Class: Insecta
- Order: Coleoptera
- Suborder: Polyphaga
- Infraorder: Scarabaeiformia
- Family: Scarabaeidae
- Genus: Gnaphalopoda
- Species: G. porcata

Binomial name
- Gnaphalopoda porcata Fauvel, 1903

Species of beetle

Gnaphalopoda porcata is a species of beetle of the family Scarabaeidae. It is found in New Caledonia (Grande Terre, Isle of Pines).

== Description ==
Adults reach a length of about 8–8.5 mm (0.31–0.33 in). They have an oval, shiny, greenish-bronze body, with the forebody sometimes coppery. The tarsi and mouthparts are reddish-brown and the club of the antennae is testaceous.
