= Gnaphalopoda opacina =

Scientific classification
- Kingdom: Animalia
- Phylum: Arthropoda
- Clade: Pancrustacea
- Class: Insecta
- Order: Coleoptera
- Suborder: Polyphaga
- Infraorder: Scarabaeiformia
- Family: Scarabaeidae
- Genus: Gnaphalopoda
- Species: G. opacina

Binomial name
- Gnaphalopoda opacina Fauvel, 1903

Species of beetle

Gnaphalopoda opacina is a species of beetle of the family Scarabaeidae. It is found in New Caledonia (Grande Terre, Isle of Pines).

== Description ==
Adults reach a length of about 9 mm (0.35 in). They have an oval, pitch black body, with a silky sheen.
