= Gnaphalopoda lesouefi =

Scientific classification
- Kingdom: Animalia
- Phylum: Arthropoda
- Clade: Pancrustacea
- Class: Insecta
- Order: Coleoptera
- Suborder: Polyphaga
- Infraorder: Scarabaeiformia
- Family: Scarabaeidae
- Genus: Gnaphalopoda
- Species: G. lesouefi

Binomial name
- Gnaphalopoda lesouefi Britton, 1987

Species of beetle

Gnaphalopoda lesouefi is a species of beetle of the family Scarabaeidae. It is found in Australia (Queensland).

== Description ==
Adults reach a length of about 8–9 mm (0.31–0.35 in). They can only be distinguished from Gnaphalopoda carnei by the form of the aedeagus.

== Etymology ==
The species is named for its collector, J. C. Le Souef.
