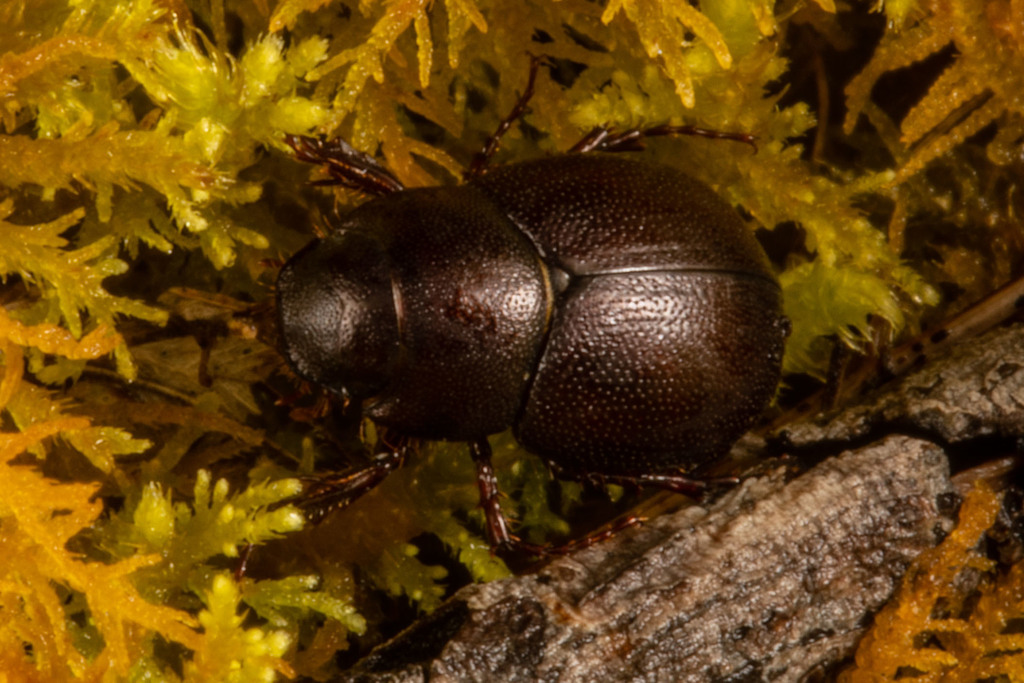

Scientific classification
- Kingdom: Animalia
- Phylum: Arthropoda
- Clade: Pancrustacea
- Class: Insecta
- Order: Coleoptera
- Suborder: Polyphaga
- Infraorder: Scarabaeiformia
- Family: Scarabaeidae
- Genus: Gnaphalopoda
- Species: G. brookesi

Binomial name
- Gnaphalopoda brookesi (Broun, 1921)

Synonyms
- Xylostygnus brookesi Broun, 1921

= Gnaphalopoda brookesi =

Species of beetle

Gnaphalopoda brookesi is a species of beetle of the family Scarabaeidae. It is found in New Zealand (North Island).

== Description ==
Adults reach a length of about 9.5–10 mm (0.37–0.39 in). They have a suboblong-oval, moderately convex, shiny body, with various small greyish setae above. They are castaneo-rufous, slightly aeneous, with the antennae paler.

== Etymology ==
The species is named after its collector, Mr. A. E. Brookes.
