= Gnaphalopoda frons =

Scientific classification
- Kingdom: Animalia
- Phylum: Arthropoda
- Clade: Pancrustacea
- Class: Insecta
- Order: Coleoptera
- Suborder: Polyphaga
- Infraorder: Scarabaeiformia
- Family: Scarabaeidae
- Genus: Gnaphalopoda
- Species: G. frons

Binomial name
- Gnaphalopoda frons Britton, 1987

Species of beetle

Gnaphalopoda frons is a species of beetle of the family Scarabaeidae. It is found in Australia (Northern Territory).

== Description ==
Adults reach a length of about 7 mm (0.28 in). They are black. The disc of the pronotum is densely punctured, except for an unpunctured area along the posterior margin and in the middle. The apical half of the scutellum is also unpunctured. The pygidium is coarsely punctured.
