= Azaanthracene =

azaanthracene
- 1-Azaanthracene

- 2-Azaanthracene

- 9-Azaanthracene

Names
- Other names benzo[g]quinoline

Identifiers
CAS Number	1-: 260-36-6; 2-: 260-32-2; 9-: 260-94-6
3D model (JSmol)	1-: Interactive image; 2-: Interactive image; 9-: Interactive image
ChemSpider	1-: 453790; 2-: 523063; 9-: 8860
- InChI: 1-: InChI=1S/C13H9N/c1-2-5-11-9-13-12(6-3-7-14-13)8-10(11)4-1/h1-9H Key: RFQDDXWZZVRLKO-UHFFFAOYSA-N; 2-: InChI=1S/C13H9N/c1-2-4-11-8-13-9-14-6-5-12(13)7-10(11)3-1/h1-9H Key: JWMUHTIFNGYNFA-UHFFFAOYSA-N; 9-: InChI=1S/C13H9N/c1-3-7-12-10(5-1)9-11-6-2-4-8-13(11)14-12/h1-9H Key: DZBUGLKDJFMEHC-UHFFFAOYSA-N
- SMILES: 1-: c1ccc2cc3ncccc3cc2c1; 2-: c1ccc2cc3cnccc3cc2c1; 9-: c1ccc2nc3ccccc3cc2c1

Properties
Chemical formula	C_{13}H_{9}N
Molar mass	179.222 g·mol^{−1}
Melting point	1-aza: 108–109 °C; 2-aza: 169 °C; 9-aza: 106–110 °C
- Except where otherwise noted, data are given for materials in their standard state (at 25 °C [77 °F], 100 kPa). Infobox references

Azaanthracenes are organic compounds containing an anthracene moiety where one CH group has been replaced by nitrogen. Thus, the parents have the formula C_{13}NH_{7}, vs C_{14}H_{8} for anthracene itself. Three constitutional isomers are possible, depending on the location of N in the ring system. The isomer with the N in the central ring, variously identified as either 9-azaanthracene or 10-azaanthracene, is more commonly called acridine. The other two isomers are 1-azaanthracene and 2-azaanthracene. All three are solids at room temperature.

The azaanthracene framework can be formed by a condensation reaction to form the central ring from a precursor that contains the two side rings, among other routes. 1-Azaanthracene is the product from 2-benzyl-3-formylpyridine. 2-Azaanthracene is the product from 4-benzyl-3-formylpyridine. 9-Azaanthracene is the product from the Bernthsen acridine synthesis, using a mixture of diphenylamine and formic acid.

Azaanthracene-derived alkaloids have been characterized in nature, e.g. the cleistopholines.
