= N-Methyl-L-glutamic acid =

N-Methyl-l-glutamic acid

Names
- IUPAC name N-Methyl-L-glutamic acid
- Systematic IUPAC name (2S)-2-(Methylamino)pentanedioic acid
- Other names N-Methylglutamic acid; Methylglutamic acid; Methylglutamate

Identifiers
| CAS Number | 35989-16-3 |
| 3D model (JSmol) | Interactive image |
| ChEBI | CHEBI:16440 |
| ChemSpider | 388497 |
| KEGG | C01046 |
| PubChem CID | 439377 |
| UNII | 557ZPU13HK |
| CompTox Dashboard (EPA) | DTXSID101035891 |
- InChI: InChI=1S/C6H11NO4/c1-7-4(6(10)11)2-3-5(8)9/h4,7H,2-3H2,1H3,(H,8,9)(H,10,11)/t4-/m0/s1 Key: XLBVNMSMFQMKEY-BYPYZUCNSA-N
- SMILES: O=C(O)CC[C@H](NC)C(=O)O

Properties
| Chemical formula | C_{6}H_{11}NO_{4} |
| Molar mass | 161.157 g·mol^{−1} |
- Except where otherwise noted, data are given for materials in their standard state (at 25 °C [77 °F], 100 kPa). Infobox references

N-Methyl-l-glutamic acid (methylglutamate) is a chemical derivative of glutamic acid in which a methyl group has been added to the amino group. It is an intermediate in methane metabolism. Biosynthetically, it is produced from methylamine and glutamic acid by the enzyme methylamine—glutamate N-methyltransferase. It can also be demethylated by methylglutamate dehydrogenase to regenerate glutamic acid.
