= Gnaphalopoda lepida =

Scientific classification
- Kingdom: Animalia
- Phylum: Arthropoda
- Clade: Pancrustacea
- Class: Insecta
- Order: Coleoptera
- Suborder: Polyphaga
- Infraorder: Scarabaeiformia
- Family: Scarabaeidae
- Genus: Gnaphalopoda
- Species: G. lepida

Binomial name
- Gnaphalopoda lepida (Blackburn, 1900)

Synonyms
- Ocnodus lepidus Blackburn, 1900

Species of beetle

Gnaphalopoda lepida is a species of beetle of the family Scarabaeidae. It is found in Australia (South Australia, New South Wales, Queensland).

== Description ==
Adults reach a length of about 7.5–10 mm (0.30–0.39 in). They are reddish brown. The disc of the pronotum has well-defined punctures and the elytra have punctures arranged in rows. The pygidium is shining and punctured.
