= Gnaphalopoda solida =

Scientific classification
- Kingdom: Animalia
- Phylum: Arthropoda
- Clade: Pancrustacea
- Class: Insecta
- Order: Coleoptera
- Suborder: Polyphaga
- Infraorder: Scarabaeiformia
- Family: Scarabaeidae
- Genus: Gnaphalopoda
- Species: G. solida

Binomial name
- Gnaphalopoda solida Britton, 1987

Species of beetle

Gnaphalopoda solida is a species of beetle of the family Scarabaeidae. It is found in Australia (Western Australia).

== Description ==
Adults reach a length of about 7–8.5 mm (0.28–0.33 in). They are dark reddish brown. The pronotum and elytra are uniformly punctured, while the scutellum has punctures at the sides, but is smooth in the middle and at the apex.
