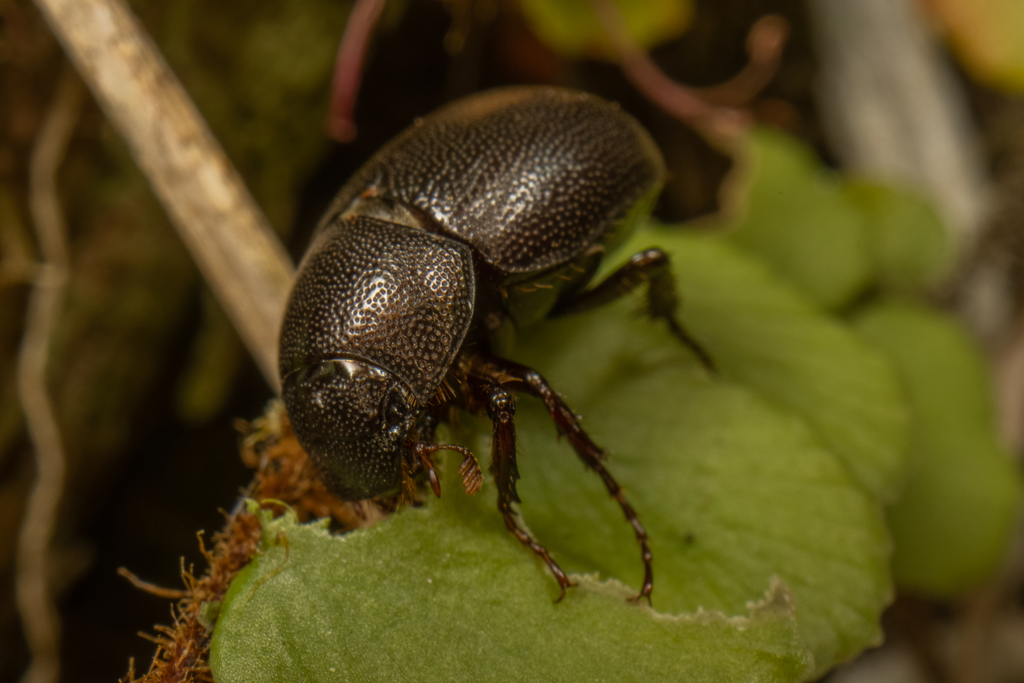

Scientific classification
- Kingdom: Animalia
- Phylum: Arthropoda
- Clade: Pancrustacea
- Class: Insecta
- Order: Coleoptera
- Suborder: Polyphaga
- Infraorder: Scarabaeiformia
- Family: Scarabaeidae
- Genus: Gnaphalopoda
- Species: G. piceus

Binomial name
- Gnaphalopoda piceus (Broun, 1886)

Synonyms
- Xylostygnus piceus Broun, 1886

= Gnaphalopoda piceus =

Species of beetle

Gnaphalopoda piceus is a species of beetle of the family Scarabaeidae. It is found in New Zealand (North Island).

== Description ==
Adults reach a length of about 9–10 mm (0.35–0.39 in). They have a black, sub-opaque body, with the sides of the body sparsely ciliated with brownish hairs. There are minute greyish setae on the surface. The legs are pitchy-red, while the tarsi and antennae are infuscate-red, with the club paler.
