= Gnaphalopoda biloba =

Scientific classification
- Kingdom: Animalia
- Phylum: Arthropoda
- Clade: Pancrustacea
- Class: Insecta
- Order: Coleoptera
- Suborder: Polyphaga
- Infraorder: Scarabaeiformia
- Family: Scarabaeidae
- Genus: Gnaphalopoda
- Species: G. biloba

Binomial name
- Gnaphalopoda biloba (Lea, 1917)

Synonyms
- Ocnodus bilobus Lea, 1917

Species of beetle

Gnaphalopoda biloba is a species of beetle of the family Scarabaeidae. It is found in Australia (Western Australia).

== Description ==
Adults reach a length of about 8.5 mm (0.33 in). They are dark reddish brown. The punctuation of the posterior margin of the pronotum is as in Gnaphalopoda crassa and the elytra are also mostly as in crassa. The pygidium is coarsely punctured.
