= Gnaphalopoda punctatissima =

Scientific classification
- Kingdom: Animalia
- Phylum: Arthropoda
- Clade: Pancrustacea
- Class: Insecta
- Order: Coleoptera
- Suborder: Polyphaga
- Infraorder: Scarabaeiformia
- Family: Scarabaeidae
- Genus: Gnaphalopoda
- Species: G. punctatissima

Binomial name
- Gnaphalopoda punctatissima (Montrouzier, 1855)

Synonyms
- Rhisotrogus punctatissimus Montrouzier, 1855

Species of beetle

Gnaphalopoda punctatissima is a species of beetle of the family Scarabaeidae. It is found in Papua New Guinea (Lif Island).

== Description ==
Adults reach a length of about 9.5 mm (0.37 in). They are dark brown, and very punctured. The head is slightly rough. The elytra, which are of the same width as the pronotum at the base, widen towards the center. The underside is dark, ferruginous red.
