= Gnaphalopoda fallax =

Scientific classification
- Kingdom: Animalia
- Phylum: Arthropoda
- Clade: Pancrustacea
- Class: Insecta
- Order: Coleoptera
- Suborder: Polyphaga
- Infraorder: Scarabaeiformia
- Family: Scarabaeidae
- Genus: Gnaphalopoda
- Species: G. fallax

Binomial name
- Gnaphalopoda fallax (Blackburn, 1892)

Synonyms
- Ocnodus fallax Blackburn, 1892

Species of beetle

Gnaphalopoda fallax is a species of beetle of the family Scarabaeidae. It is found in Australia (Western Australia, Northern Territory).

== Description ==
Adults reach a length of about 12–13 mm (0.47–0.51 in).
