= Anthranilate N-methyltransferase =

Class of enzymes

Identifiers
- EC no.: 2.1.1.111
- CAS no.: 123779-15-7

Databases
- IntEnz: IntEnz view
- BRENDA: BRENDA entry
- ExPASy: NiceZyme view
- KEGG: KEGG entry
- MetaCyc: metabolic pathway
- PRIAM: profile
- PDB structures: RCSB PDB PDBe PDBsum
- Gene Ontology: AmiGO / QuickGO
Search
- PMC: articles
- PubMed: articles
- NCBI: proteins

Anthranilate N-methyltransferase (EC 2.1.1.111) is an enzyme that catalyzes the chemical reaction

anthranilic acid
+ SAM
N-methylanthranilic acid
+ SAH

This is a methylation reaction in which the anthranilic acid is converted to N-methylanthranilic acid. The methyl group comes from the cofactor, S-adenosyl methionine (SAM), which becomes S-adenosyl-L-homocysteine (SAH). The enzyme was characterised from Ruta graveolens.

This enzyme belongs to the family of transferases, specifically those transferring one-carbon group methyltransferases. The systematic name of this enzyme class is S-adenosyl-L-methionine:anthranilate N-methyltransferase. It is also called anthranilic acid N-methyltransferase. The reaction is the first step specific to the biosynthesis of acridone alkaloids.
