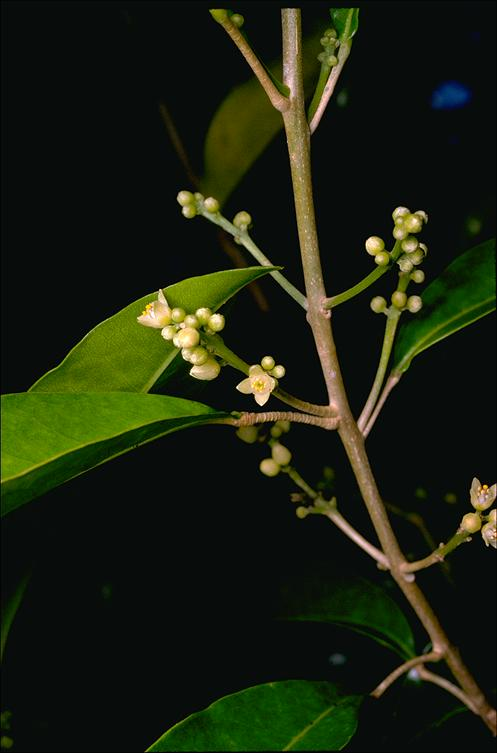
- Female flowers near Mullumbimby, New South Wales

Scientific classification
- Kingdom: Plantae
- Clade: Tracheophytes
- Clade: Angiosperms
- Clade: Eudicots
- Clade: Rosids
- Order: Sapindales
- Family: Rutaceae
- Genus: Sarcomelicope
- Species: S. simplicifolia

Binomial name
- Sarcomelicope simplicifolia (Endl.) T.G.Hartley

Synonyms
- Acronychia simplicifolia (Endl.) Steud. nom. inval., pro syn.; Acronychia simplicifolia (Endl.) Steud.; Acronychia simplicifolia (Endl.) McGill. & P.S.Green nom. illeg., nom. superfl.; Bauerella simplicifolia (Endl.) T.G.Hartley; Vepris simplicifolia Endl.

= Sarcomelicope simplicifolia =

Bauerella

Species of tree

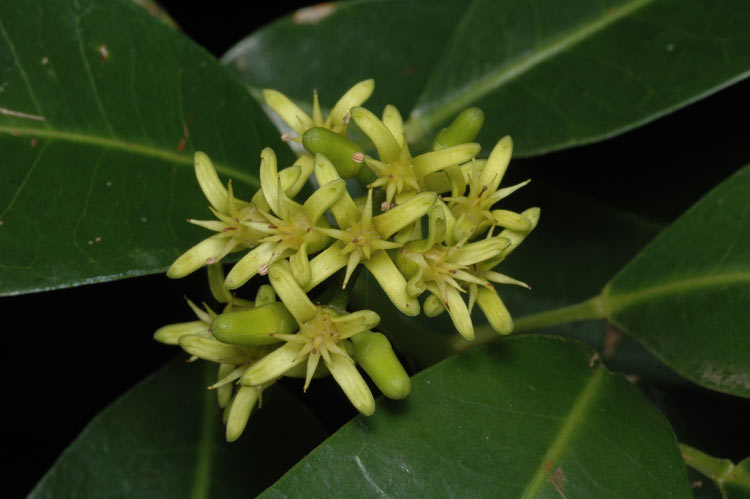
Male flowers

Sarcomelicope simplicifolia, commonly known as bauerella, hard aspen or yellow-wood, is a species of flowering plant in the family Rutaceae and is endemic to eastern Australia including Lord Howe and Norfolk Islands. It is a shrub or small tree with elliptic to egg-shaped leaves arranged in opposite pairs, male or female flowers arranged in small groups in leaf axils and fruit an oval to spherical drupe.

== Description ==
Sarcomelicope simplicifolia is a shrub or small tree that typically grows to a height of 18 m (59 ft). It has a cylindrical trunk with corky and fissured bark. The leaves are arranged in opposite pairs, rarely in whorls of three, shiny on the upper surface, paler below, and are elliptic to egg-shaped with the narrower end towards the base, 30–170 mm (1.2–6.7 in) long and 20–70 mm (0.79–2.76 in) wide on a petiole 10–50 mm (0.39–1.97 in) long. The flowers are arranged in leaf axils in small groups 8–60 mm (0.31–2.36 in) long, the flowers functionally male or female. The male flowers are 3–3.5 mm (0.12–0.14 in) long, with eight stamens alternating in length and the female flowers are 4–4.5 mm (0.16–0.18 in) long. Flowering mainly occurs from February to August and the fruit is a drupe 10–15 mm (0.39–0.59 in) long containing seeds 5–7.5 mm (0.20–0.30 in) long.

== Taxonomy ==
Bauerella was first formally described in 1833 by Stephan Endlicher in his book Prodromus Florae Norfolkicae and was given the name Vepris simplicifolia from specimens collected on Norfolk Island. In 1982 Thomas Gordon Hartley changed the name to Sarcomelicope simplicifolia and described the subspecies simplicifolia in the Australian Journal of Botany. The name of the subspecies is accepted by the Australian Plant Census.

== Distribution and habitat ==
Sarcomelicope simplicifolia subsp. simplicifolia grows in, and on the margins of warmer rainforest from near Mount Carbine area in tropical north Queensland to Mount Dromedary in south-eastern New South Wales. It is also found on Norfolk Island and Lord Howe Island.

Subspecies neoscotia occurs in New Caledonia and Vanuatu.

== Ecology ==
The fruit is eaten by a variety of birds, including green catbird and white headed pigeon.

== Use in horticulture ==
Regeneration from seed is not easily achieved. Seeds should be removed from the flesh, then soaked for a week or two. After six months, around half of these may send out roots and shoots.
