= Gnaphalopoda kraussi =

Scientific classification
- Kingdom: Animalia
- Phylum: Arthropoda
- Clade: Pancrustacea
- Class: Insecta
- Order: Coleoptera
- Suborder: Polyphaga
- Infraorder: Scarabaeiformia
- Family: Scarabaeidae
- Genus: Gnaphalopoda
- Species: G. kraussi

Binomial name
- Gnaphalopoda kraussi Paulian, 1991

Species of beetle

Gnaphalopoda kraussi is a species of beetle of the family Scarabaeidae. It is found in New Caledonia (Loyalty Islands).

== Description ==
Adults reach a length of about 9.5 mm (0.37 in). They have an slightly convex, oval, pitch brown body, with lighter elytra and silky reflections.
