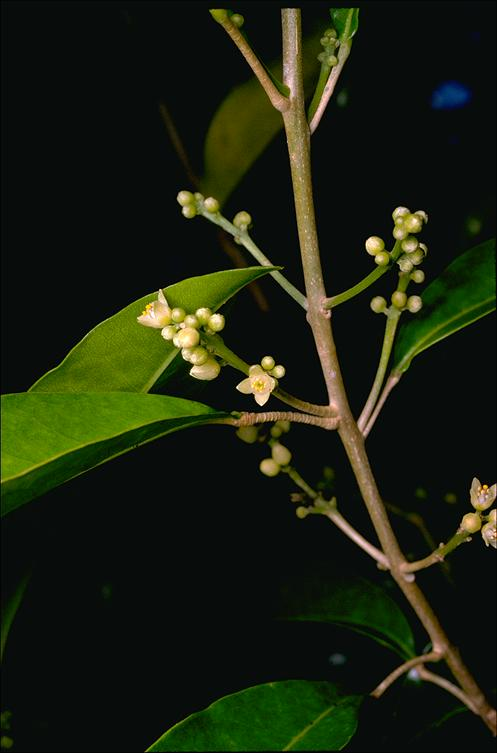
- Sarcomelicope simplicifolia

Scientific classification
- Kingdom: Plantae
- Clade: Tracheophytes
- Clade: Angiosperms
- Clade: Eudicots
- Clade: Rosids
- Order: Sapindales
- Family: Rutaceae
- Subfamily: Zanthoxyloideae
- Genus: Sarcomelicope; Engl.

= Sarcomelicope =

Genus of flowering plants

Sarcomelicope is a genus of about ten species of flowering plants in the family Rutaceae that are endemic to the South Pacific.

== Description ==
Plants in the genus Sarcomelicope are shrubs to medium-sized trees with simple leaves and flowers arranged in panicles in leaf axils, separate male and female flowers with four sepals and four petals that are free from each other and overlapping at the base. Male flowers have eight stamens that are free from each other and female flowers have four carpels that are fused, at least at the base with two ovules in each carpel. The fruit is a drupe of four carpels, partly or completely fused, and the seeds are dark brown to black.

== Taxonomy ==
The genus Sarcomelicope was first formally described in 1896 by Adolf Engler in Die Natürlichen Pflanzenfamilien and the type species is Sarcomelicope sarcococca.

=== Species list ===
The following is a list of Sarcomelicope species accepted at Plants of the World Online:

- Sarcomelicope argyrophylla Guillaumin (New Caledonia)
- Sarcomelicope dogniensis Hartley (New Caledonia)
- Sarcomelicope follicularis Hartley (New Caledonia)
- Sarcomelicope glauca Hartley (New Caledonia)
- Sarcomelicope leiocarpa (P.S.Green) Hartley (New Caledonia)
- Sarcomelicope megistophylla Hartley (New Caledonia)
- Sarcomelicope pembaiensis Hartley (New Caledonia)
- Sarcomelicope petiolaris (A.Gray) A.C.Sm. (Fiji)
- Sarcomelicope sarcococca (Baill.) Engl. (New Caledonia)
- Sarcomelicope simplicifolia (Endl.) T.G.Hartley (New South Wales, Queensland, Norfolk Island, Lord Howe Island)
  - Sarcomelicope simplicifolia (Endl.) T.G.Hartley subsp. simplicifolia (New South Wales, Queensland, Norfolk Island, Lord Howe Island)
  - Sarcomelicope simplicifolia subsp. neoscotica (P.S.Green) T.G.Hartley (New Caledonia)
