= Gnaphalopoda crassa =

Scientific classification
- Kingdom: Animalia
- Phylum: Arthropoda
- Clade: Pancrustacea
- Class: Insecta
- Order: Coleoptera
- Suborder: Polyphaga
- Infraorder: Scarabaeiformia
- Family: Scarabaeidae
- Genus: Gnaphalopoda
- Species: G. crassa

Binomial name
- Gnaphalopoda crassa Britton, 1987

Species of beetle

Gnaphalopoda crassa is a species of beetle of the family Scarabaeidae. It is found in Australia (South Australia, Northern Territory).

== Description ==
Adults reach a length of about 7–8.5 mm (0.28–0.33 in). They are dark reddish brown. The pronotum is uniformly punctured, the scutellum is densely punctured at the base, but sparsely punctured towards the apex and the elytra are punctured as in Gnaphalopoda suspiciosa. The pygidium is coarsely and irregularly punctured.
