= Gnaphalopoda =

Scientific classification
- Kingdom: Animalia
- Phylum: Arthropoda
- Clade: Pancrustacea
- Class: Insecta
- Order: Coleoptera
- Suborder: Polyphaga
- Infraorder: Scarabaeiformia
- Family: Scarabaeidae
- Subfamily: Sericoidinae
- Tribe: Scitalini
- Genus: Gnaphalopoda; Reiche, 1860

Synonyms
- Xylostygnus Broun, 1886

Genus of beetles

Gnaphalopoda is a genus of beetles belonging to the family Scarabaeidae.

== Species ==
- Gnaphalopoda aenea Fauvel, 1903
- Gnaphalopoda ascia Britton, 1987
- Gnaphalopoda austrina Britton, 1987
- Gnaphalopoda baladica Fauvel, 1903
- Gnaphalopoda bidentata (Lea, 1917)
- Gnaphalopoda biloba (Lea, 1917)
- Gnaphalopoda brookesi (Broun, 1921)
- Gnaphalopoda carnei Britton, 1987
- Gnaphalopoda crassa Britton, 1987
- Gnaphalopoda curticollis Fauvel, 1903
- Gnaphalopoda deslongchampsi Fauvel, 1862
- Gnaphalopoda eremia Britton, 1987
- Gnaphalopoda fallax (Blackburn, 1892)
- Gnaphalopoda fauveli Paulian, 1991
- Gnaphalopoda frons Britton, 1987
- Gnaphalopoda kraussi Paulian, 1991
- Gnaphalopoda lepida (Blackburn, 1900)
- Gnaphalopoda leptopoda (Montrouzier, 1860)
- Gnaphalopoda lesouefi Britton, 1987
- Gnaphalopoda lirella Britton, 1987
- Gnaphalopoda lugubris (Blackburn, 1892)
- Gnaphalopoda montrouzieri Paulian, 1991
- Gnaphalopoda opacina Fauvel, 1903
- Gnaphalopoda piceus (Broun, 1886)
- Gnaphalopoda porcata Fauvel, 1903
- Gnaphalopoda porosa (Blackburn, 1907)
- Gnaphalopoda proxima Britton, 1987
- Gnaphalopoda punctatissima (Montrouzier, 1855)
- Gnaphalopoda pygialis Fauvel, 1903
- Gnaphalopoda scissiceps (Blackburn, 1907)
- Gnaphalopoda seriata Fauvel, 1903
- Gnaphalopoda solida Britton, 1987
- Gnaphalopoda spinicollis (Blackburn, 1892)
- Gnaphalopoda suspiciosa (Blackburn, 1907)
- Gnaphalopoda tridentata (Lea, 1917)
- Gnaphalopoda undata Paulian, 1991
- Gnaphalopoda unidentata (Lea, 1917)
- Gnaphalopoda varians (Reiche, 1860)
