= Gnaphalopoda eremia =

Scientific classification
- Kingdom: Animalia
- Phylum: Arthropoda
- Clade: Pancrustacea
- Class: Insecta
- Order: Coleoptera
- Suborder: Polyphaga
- Infraorder: Scarabaeiformia
- Family: Scarabaeidae
- Genus: Gnaphalopoda
- Species: G. eremia

Binomial name
- Gnaphalopoda eremia Britton, 1987

Species of beetle

Gnaphalopoda eremia is a species of beetle of the family Scarabaeidae. It is found in Australia (South Australia).

== Description ==
Adults reach a length of about 9.5 mm (0.37 in). They are dark reddish brown and shining. The disc of the pronotum is punctured, but there is a small unpunctured area in the middle of the disc. The elytra are more sparsely punctured, with the punctures arranged in lines. The pygidium is sparsely punctured.
