= Acridine =

Organic compound used in dyes

- Acridine chemical structure

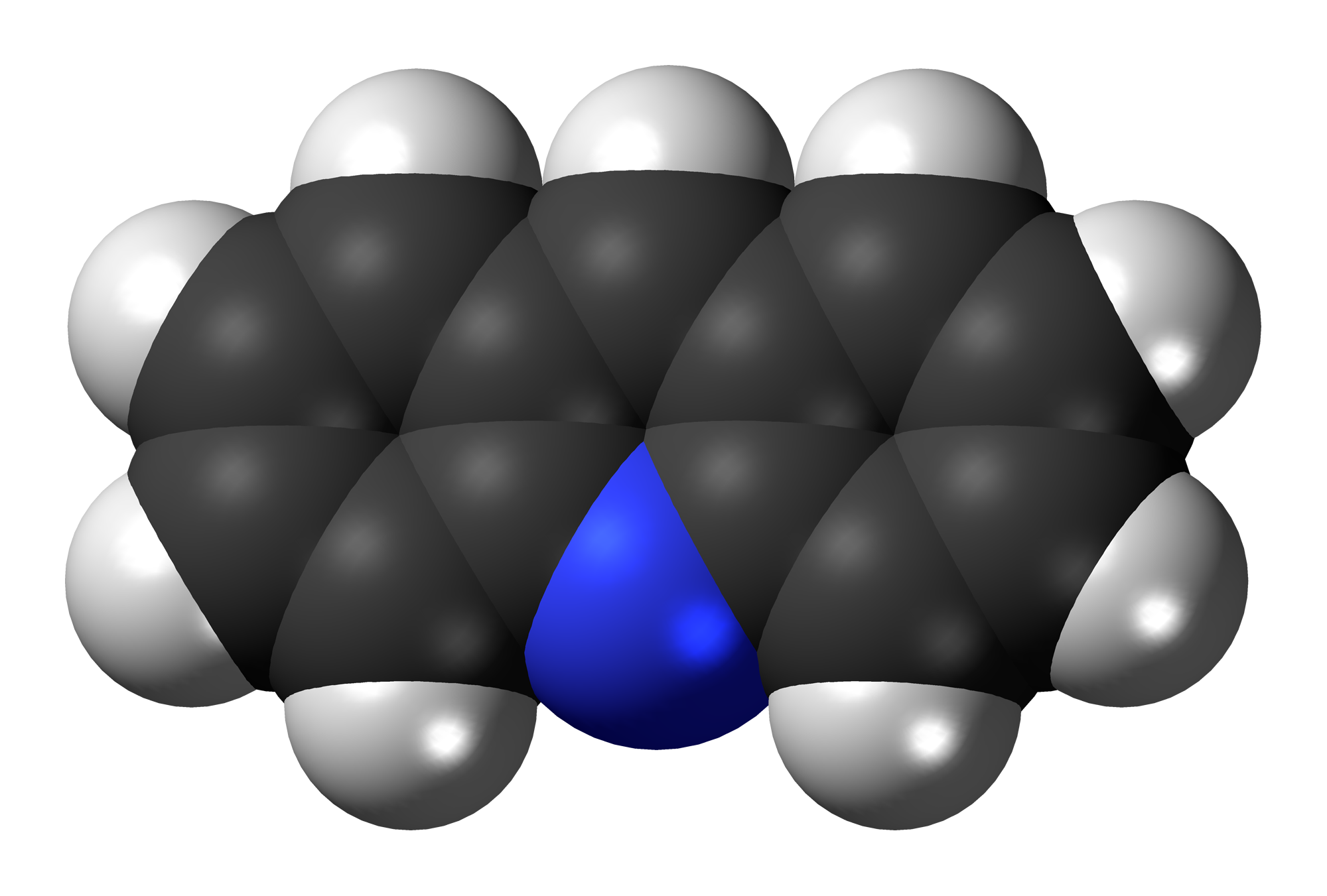

Names
- Preferred IUPAC name Acridine
- Other names Dibenzo[b,e]pyridine; 2,3-Benzoquinoline

Identifiers
CAS Number	260-94-6
3D model (JSmol)	Interactive image; Interactive image
Beilstein Reference	120200
ChEBI	CHEBI:36420
ChEMBL	ChEMBL39677
ChemSpider	8860
ECHA InfoCard	100.005.429
EC Number	205-971-6
Gmelin Reference	143403
PubChem CID	9215
RTECS number	AR7175000
UNII	42NI1P5Q1X
UN number	2713
CompTox Dashboard (EPA)	DTXSID8059766
- InChI: InChI=1S/C13H9N/c1-3-7-12-10(5-1)9-11-6-2-4-8-13(11)14-12/h1-9H Key: DZBUGLKDJFMEHC-UHFFFAOYSA-N; InChI=1/C13H9N/c1-3-7-12-10(5-1)9-11-6-2-4-8-13(11)14-12/h1-9H Key: DZBUGLKDJFMEHC-UHFFFAOYAF
- SMILES: n1c3c(cc2c1cccc2)cccc3; c1ccc2c(c1)cc3ccccc3n2

Properties
Chemical formula	C_{13}H_{9}N
Molar mass	179.222 g·mol^{−1}
Appearance	White powder
Odor	Irritating
Density	1.005 g/cm^{3} (20 °C)
Melting point	106–110 °C (223–230 °F; 379–383 K) at standard pressure
Boiling point	344.86 °C (652.75 °F; 618.01 K) at standard pressure
Solubility in water	46.5 mg/L
Solubility	Soluble in CCl_{4}, alcohols, (C_{2}H_{5})_{2}O, C_{6}H_{6}
log P	3.4
Vapor pressure	0.34 kPa (150 °C); 2.39 kPa (200 °C); 11.13 kPa (250 °C)
Acidity (pK_{a})	5.58 (20 °C)
UV-vis (λ_{max})	392 nm
Magnetic susceptibility (χ)	−123.3×10^{−6} cm^{3}/mol

Thermochemistry
Heat capacity (C)	205.07 J/mol·K
Std molar entropy (S^{⦵}_{298})	208.03 J/mol·K
Std enthalpy of formation (Δ_{f}H^{⦵}_{298})	179.4 kJ/mol
Std enthalpy of combustion (Δ_{c}H^{⦵}_{298})	6581.3 kJ/mol

Hazards
- GHS labelling
Pictograms	(GHS07: Exclamation mark)
Signal word	Danger
Hazard statements	H302, H312, H315, H319, H332, H335
Precautionary statements	P261, P264, P270, P271, P280, P301+P312, P302+P352, P304+P312, P304+P340, P305+P351+P338, P312, P321, P322, P330, P332+P313, P337+P313, P362, P363, P403+P233, P405, P501
NFPA 704 (fire diamond)	2 1 0
- Lethal dose or concentration (LD, LC)
LD_{50} (median dose)	500 mg/kg (mice, oral)
- NIOSH (US health exposure limits)
PEL (Permissible)	TWA 0.2 mg/m^{3} (benzene-soluble fraction)
- Except where otherwise noted, data are given for materials in their standard state (at 25 °C [77 °F], 100 kPa). verify (what is ?) Infobox references

Acridine is an organic compound and a nitrogen-containing heterocyclic compound with the formula C_{13}H_{9}N. Acridines are substituted derivatives of this parent tricyclic ring system. It is a planar molecule that is an azaanthracene—an anthracene with one of the central CH groups replaced by nitrogen. Like the related molecules pyridine and quinoline, acridine is mildly basic. It is an almost colorless solid, which crystallizes in needles. There are few commercial applications of acridines; at one time acridine dyes were popular, but they are now relegated to niche applications, such as with acridine orange. The name is a reference to the acrid odour and acrid skin-irritating effect of the compound.

== Isolation and syntheses ==
Carl Gräbe and Heinrich Caro first isolated acridine in 1870 from coal tar. Acridine is separated from coal tar by extracting with dilute sulfuric acid. Addition of potassium dichromate to this solution precipitates acridine bichromate. The bichromate is decomposed using ammonia.

Acridine and its derivatives can be prepared by many synthetic processes. In the Bernthsen acridine synthesis, diphenylamine is condensed with carboxylic acids in the presence of zinc chloride. When formic acid is the carboxylic acid, the reaction yields the parent acridine. With the higher larger carboxylic acids, the derivatives substituted at the meso carbon atom are generated.

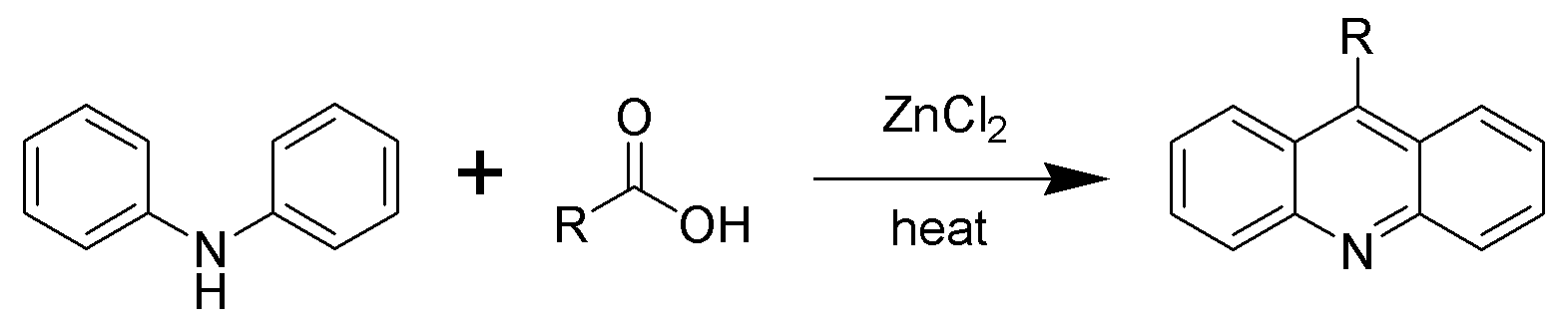
The Bernthsen acridine synthesis

Other older methods for the organic synthesis of acridines include condensing diphenylamine with chloroform in the presence of aluminium chloride, by passing the vapours of orthoaminodiphenylmethane over heated litharge, by heating salicylaldehyde with aniline and zinc chloride or by distilling acridone (9-position a carbonyl group) over zinc dust.

== Reactions ==
Acridine displays the reactions expected of an unsaturated N-heterocycle. It undergoes N-alkylation with alkyl iodides to form alkyl acridinium iodides, which are readily transformed by the action of alkaline potassium ferricyanide to N-alkyl acridones.

=== Basicity ===
Acridine and its homologues are weakly basic. Acridine is a photobase which has a ground state pK_{a} of 5.1, similar to that of pyridine, and an excited state pK_{a} of 10.6. It also shares properties with quinoline.

=== Reduction and oxidation ===
Acridines can be reduced to the 9,10-dihydroacridines, sometimes called leucoacridines. Reaction with potassium cyanide gives the 9-cyano-9,10-dehydro derivative. On oxidation with potassium permanganate, it yields acridinic acid (C_{9}H_{5}N(CO_{2}H)_{2}) otherwise known as quinoline-1,2-dicarboxylic acid. Acridine is easily oxidized by peroxymonosulfuric acid to the acridine amine oxide. The carbon 9-position of acridine is activated for addition reactions.

== Applications ==
Several dyes and drugs feature the acridine skeleton. Many acridines, such as proflavine, also have antiseptic properties. Acridine and related derivatives (such as amsacrine) bind to DNA and RNA due to their abilities to intercalate. Acridine orange (3,6-dimethylaminoacridine) is a nucleic acid-selective metachromatic stain useful for cell cycle determination.

=== Dyes ===
At one time acridine dyes were commercially significant, but they are now uncommon because they are not lightfast. Acridine dyes are prepared by condensation of 1,3-diaminobenzene derivatives. Illustrative is the reaction of 2,4-diaminotoluene with acetaldehyde:

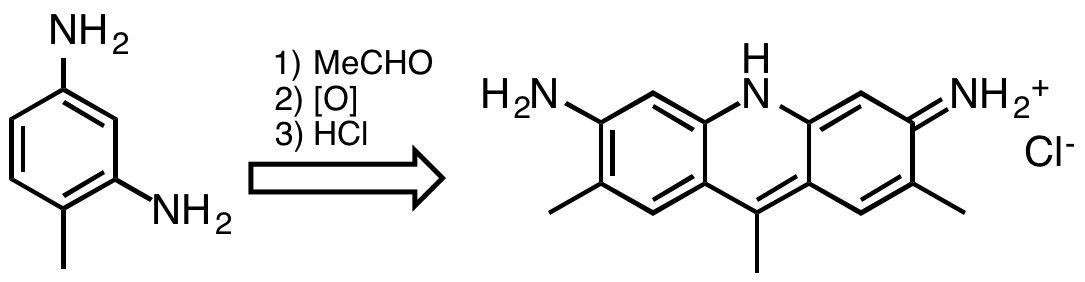
Synthesis of C.I. Basic Yellow 9, an acridine dye.

9-Phenylacridine is the parent base of chrysaniline or 3,6-diamino-9-phenylacridine, which is the chief constituent of the dyestuff phosphine (not to be confused with phosphine gas), a byproduct in the manufacture of rosaniline. Chrysaniline forms red-coloured salts, which dye silk and wool in a fine yellow; and the solutions of the salts are characterized by their fine yellowish-green fluorescence. Chrysaniline was synthesized by O. Fischer and G. Koerner by condensing o-nitrobenzaldehyde with aniline, the resulting o-nitro-p-diaminotriphenylmethane being reduced to the corresponding o-amino compound, which on oxidation yields chrysaniline.

Benzoflavin, an isomer of chrysaniline, is also a dyestuff, and has been prepared by K. Oehler from m-phenylenediamine and benzaldehyde. These substances condense to form tetraaminotriphenylmethane, which, on heating with acids, loses ammonia and yields 3,6-diamino-9,10-dihydrophenylacridine, from which benzoflavin is obtained by oxidation. It is a yellow powder, soluble in hot water.

=== Molecular biology ===
Acridine is known to induce small insertions or deletions in nucleotide sequences, resulting in frameshift mutations. This compound was useful to identify the triplet nature of the genetic codes.

== Structure ==
As established by X-ray crystallography, acridine has been obtained in eight polymorphs. All feature very similar planar molecules with nearly identical bond lengths and bond distances.

== Safety and environmental aspects ==
Acridine is a skin irritant. Its LD_{50} (rats, oral) is 2,000 mg/kg and 500 mg/kg (mice, oral). Acridine is readily degraded microbially, one main product being benzoic acid.

== See also ==
- Lucigenin, a chemiluminescent compound derived from acridine
- Xanthene
- Azaanthracene

== Literature ==
- Moloney GP, Kelly DP, Mack P (2001). "Synthesis of Acridine-based DNA Bis-intercalating Agents" (PDF). Molecules. 6 (3): 230–243. doi:10.3390/60300230.
- Schmidt A, Liu M (2015). Recent Advances in the Chemistry of Acridines. Advances in Heterocyclic Chemistry. Vol. 15. pp. 287–353. doi:10.1016/bs.aihch.2015.04.004. ISBN 9780128021293. [review article dealing with physical properties of acridines, natural products possessing the acridine core, biologically active acridines, applications of acridines, new syntheses and reactions of acridines]
