= Methylglutamate dehydrogenase =

Identifiers
- EC no.: 1.5.99.5
- CAS no.: 37217-26-8

Databases
- IntEnz: IntEnz view
- BRENDA: BRENDA entry
- ExPASy: NiceZyme view
- KEGG: KEGG entry
- MetaCyc: metabolic pathway
- PRIAM: profile
- PDB structures: RCSB PDB PDBe PDBsum
- Gene Ontology: AmiGO / QuickGO
Search
- PMC: articles
- PubMed: articles
- NCBI: proteins

Methylglutamate dehydrogenase (EC 1.5.99.5) is an enzyme that catalyzes the chemical reaction

N-Methyl-L-glutamic acid
+ electron
acceptor
H_{2}O
L-glutamic acid
+ reduced
acceptor
+ H_{2}C=O

The three substrates of this enzyme are N-methyl-L-glutamic acid, an electron acceptor, and water. Its products are L-glutamic acid, the corresponding reduced acceptor, and formaldehyde.

This enzyme belongs to the family of oxidoreductases, specifically those acting on the CH-NH group of donors with other acceptors. The systematic name of this enzyme class is N-methyl-L-glutamate:acceptor oxidoreductase (demethylating). Other names in common use include N-methylglutamate dehydrogenase, and N-methyl-L-glutamate:(acceptor) oxidoreductase (demethylating). This enzyme participates in methane metabolism.
