= Gnaphalopoda fauveli =

Scientific classification
- Kingdom: Animalia
- Phylum: Arthropoda
- Clade: Pancrustacea
- Class: Insecta
- Order: Coleoptera
- Suborder: Polyphaga
- Infraorder: Scarabaeiformia
- Family: Scarabaeidae
- Genus: Gnaphalopoda
- Species: G. fauveli

Binomial name
- Gnaphalopoda fauveli Paulian, 1991

Species of beetle

Gnaphalopoda fauveli is a species of beetle of the family Scarabaeidae. It is found in New Caledonia (Grande Terre).

== Description ==
Adults reach a length of about 11 mm (0.43 in). They have an elongated, brown body. The elytra are dull, while the forebody is shiny.
