= Lucigenin =

Names
- Preferred IUPAC name 10,10′-Dimethyl[9,9′-biacridine]-10,10′-diium dinitrate
- Other names Bis-N-methylacridinium nitrate; N,N′-Dimethyl-9,9'-bisacridinium nitrate

Identifiers
CAS Number	2315-97-1
3D model (JSmol)	Interactive image
ChemSpider	58609
ECHA InfoCard	100.017.295
PubChem CID	65099
CompTox Dashboard (EPA)	DTXSID50177736
- InChI: InChI=1S/C28H22N2.2NO3/c1-29-23-15-7-3-11-19(23)27(20-12-4-8-16-24(20)29)28-21-13-5-9-17-25(21)30(2)26-18-10-6-14-22(26)28;2*2-1(3)4/h3-18H,1-2H3;;/q+2;2*-1 Key: KNJDBYZZKAZQNG-UHFFFAOYSA-N; InChI=1/C28H22N2.2NO3/c1-29-23-15-7-3-11-19(23)27(20-12-4-8-16-24(20)29)28-21-13-5-9-17-25(21)30(2)26-18-10-6-14-22(26)28;2*2-1(3)4/h3-18H,1-2H3;;/q+2;2*-1 Key: KNJDBYZZKAZQNG-UHFFFAOYAH
- SMILES: C[n+]1c2ccccc2c(c3c1cccc3)c4c5ccccc5[n+](c6c4cccc6)C.[N+](=O)([O-])[O-].[N+](=O)([O-])[O-]

Properties
Chemical formula	C_{28}H_{22}N_{4}O_{6}
Molar mass	510.506 g·mol^{−1}
- Except where otherwise noted, data are given for materials in their standard state (at 25 °C [77 °F], 100 kPa). verify (what is ?) Infobox references

Lucigenin is an aromatic compound used in areas which include chemiluminescence. Its chemical name is bis-N-methylacridinium nitrate. It exhibits a bluish-green fluorescence.

It is used as a probe for superoxide anion in biology, for its chemiluminescent properties.

== Synthesis ==
It may be prepared from acridone.

There's also a route from toluene:

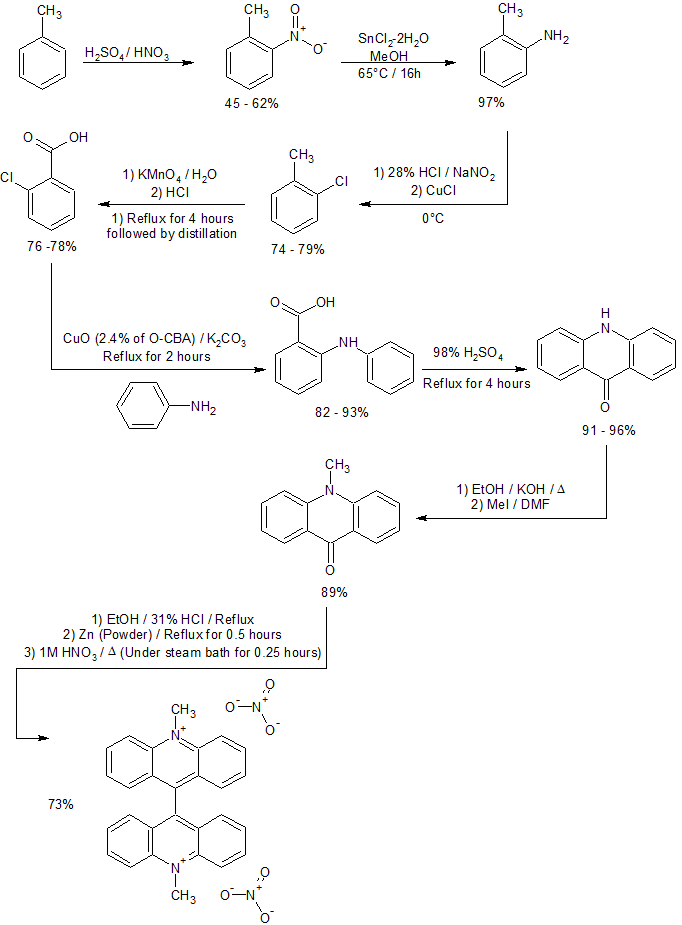
Synthesis of Lucigenin from Toluene. References in the image description.
