= Gnaphalopoda undata =

Scientific classification
- Kingdom: Animalia
- Phylum: Arthropoda
- Clade: Pancrustacea
- Class: Insecta
- Order: Coleoptera
- Suborder: Polyphaga
- Infraorder: Scarabaeiformia
- Family: Scarabaeidae
- Genus: Gnaphalopoda
- Species: G. undata

Binomial name
- Gnaphalopoda undata Paulian, 1991

Species of beetle

Gnaphalopoda undata is a species of beetle of the family Scarabaeidae. It is found in New Caledonia (Grande Terre).

== Description ==
Adults reach a length of about 10 mm (0.39 in). They have an oval, shiny black body, with a sparse fringe of light spiny setae at the sides. The underside has fine, light, sparse pubescence.
