= Gnaphalopoda curticollis =

Scientific classification
- Kingdom: Animalia
- Phylum: Arthropoda
- Clade: Pancrustacea
- Class: Insecta
- Order: Coleoptera
- Suborder: Polyphaga
- Infraorder: Scarabaeiformia
- Family: Scarabaeidae
- Genus: Gnaphalopoda
- Species: G. curticollis

Binomial name
- Gnaphalopoda curticollis Fauvel, 1903

Species of beetle

Gnaphalopoda curticollis is a species of beetle of the family Scarabaeidae. It is found in New Caledonia (Grande Terre).

== Description ==
Adults reach a length of about 8.5 mm (0.33 in). They have an oval, dull, pitch black body, although the head is slightly shiny.
