= Gnaphalopoda aenea =

Scientific classification
- Kingdom: Animalia
- Phylum: Arthropoda
- Clade: Pancrustacea
- Class: Insecta
- Order: Coleoptera
- Suborder: Polyphaga
- Infraorder: Scarabaeiformia
- Family: Scarabaeidae
- Genus: Gnaphalopoda
- Species: G. aenea

Binomial name
- Gnaphalopoda aenea Fauvel, 1903

Species of beetle

Gnaphalopoda aenea is a species of beetle of the family Scarabaeidae. It is found in New Caledonia (Grande Terre).

== Description ==
Adults reach a length of about 13 mm (0.51 in). They have a convex oval, shiny bronze body.
