= Gnaphalopoda leptopoda =

Scientific classification
- Kingdom: Animalia
- Phylum: Arthropoda
- Clade: Pancrustacea
- Class: Insecta
- Order: Coleoptera
- Suborder: Polyphaga
- Infraorder: Scarabaeiformia
- Family: Scarabaeidae
- Genus: Gnaphalopoda
- Species: G. leptopoda

Binomial name
- Gnaphalopoda leptopoda (Montrouzier, 1860)

Synonyms
- Rhisotrogus leptopoda Montrouzier, 1860

Species of beetle

Gnaphalopoda leptopoda is a species of beetle of the family Scarabaeidae. It is found in New Caledonia (Grande Terre, Belep Islands).

== Description ==
Adults reach a length of about 10–14 mm (0.39–0.55 in). They have an oval, reddish body, with the forebody darker. The upper surface is shiny or silky.
