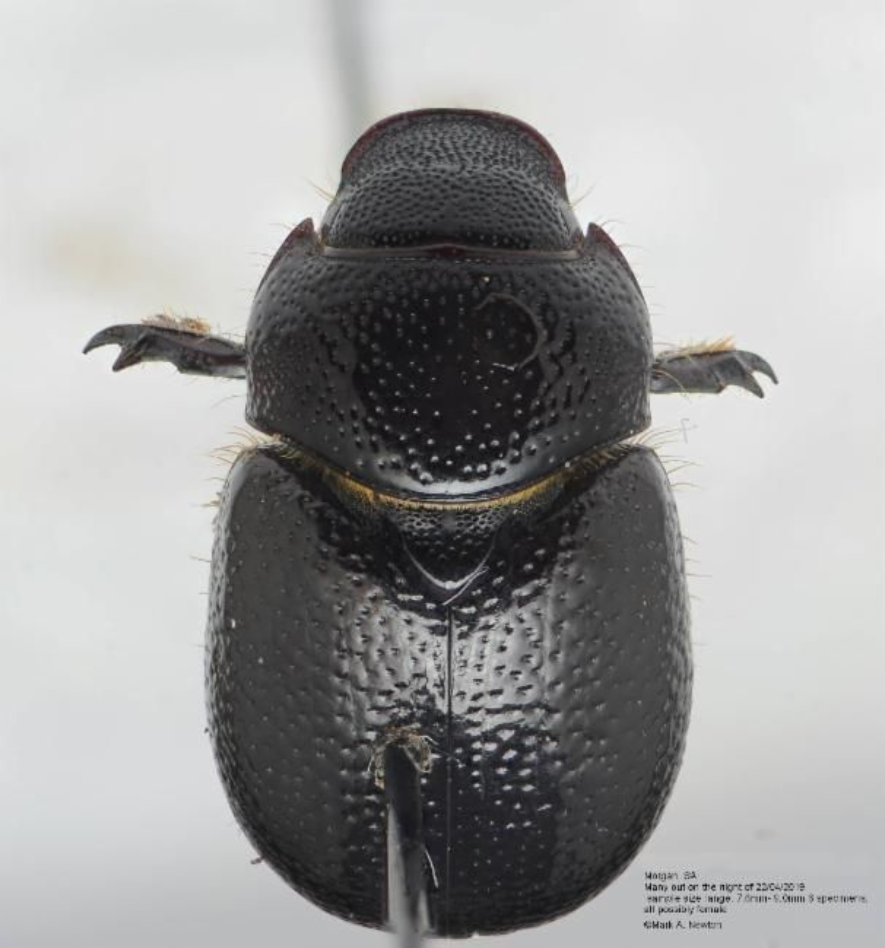

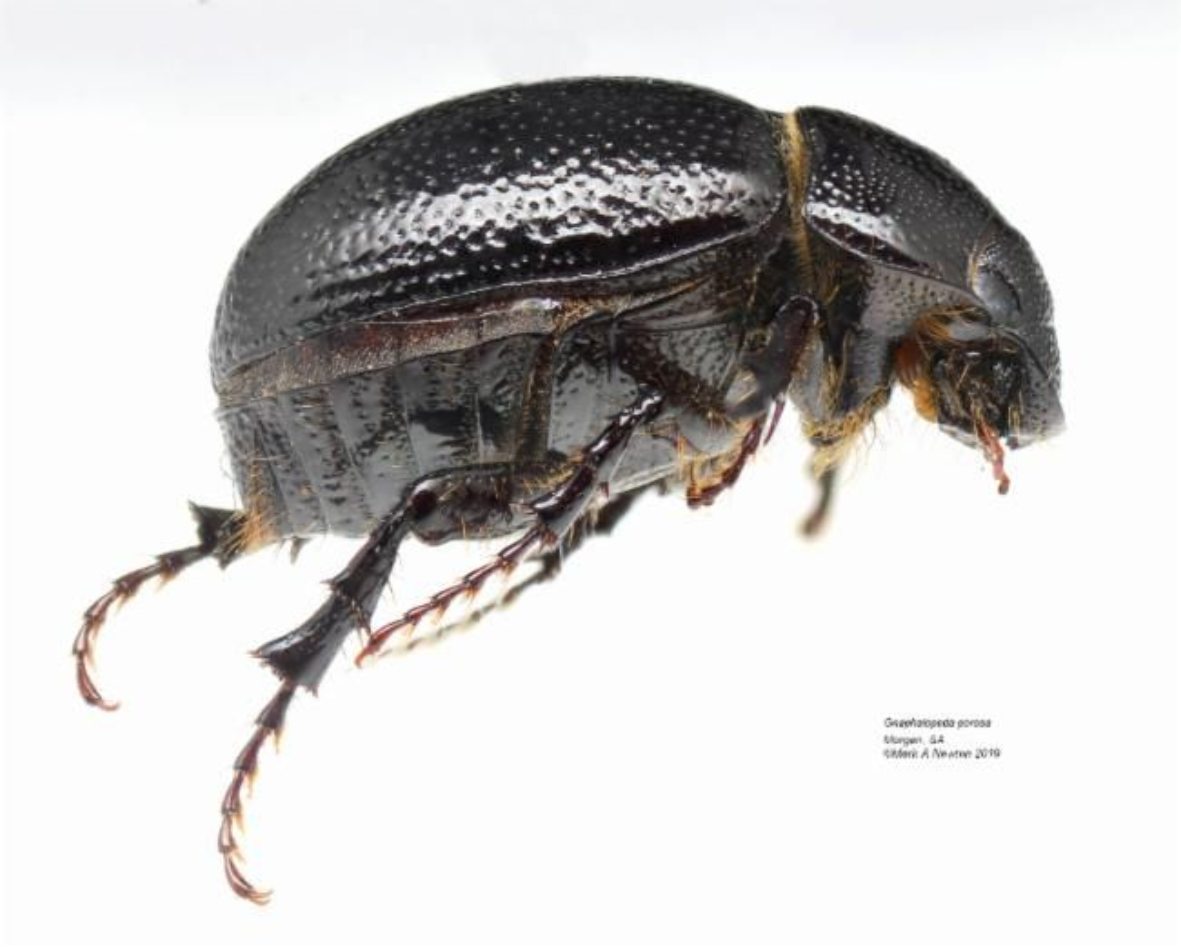

Scientific classification
- Kingdom: Animalia
- Phylum: Arthropoda
- Clade: Pancrustacea
- Class: Insecta
- Order: Coleoptera
- Suborder: Polyphaga
- Infraorder: Scarabaeiformia
- Family: Scarabaeidae
- Genus: Gnaphalopoda
- Species: G. porosa

Binomial name
- Gnaphalopoda porosa (Blackburn, 1907)

Synonyms
- Ocnodus porosus Blackburn, 1907

= Gnaphalopoda porosa =

Species of beetle

Gnaphalopoda porosa is a species of beetle of the family Scarabaeidae. It is found in Australia (Western Australia).

== Description ==
Adults reach a length of about 7–9 mm (0.28–0.35 in). They are dark reddish brown to black. The pronotum is coarsely and sparsely punctured, while the scutellum only has a few coarse punctures at the base. The elytra are shining and has coarse, sparse punctures.
