= Gnaphalopoda austrina =

Scientific classification
- Kingdom: Animalia
- Phylum: Arthropoda
- Clade: Pancrustacea
- Class: Insecta
- Order: Coleoptera
- Suborder: Polyphaga
- Infraorder: Scarabaeiformia
- Family: Scarabaeidae
- Genus: Gnaphalopoda
- Species: G. austrina

Binomial name
- Gnaphalopoda austrina Britton, 1987

Species of beetle

Gnaphalopoda austrina is a species of beetle of the family Scarabaeidae. It is found in Australia (South Australia).

== Description ==
Adults reach a length of about 10 mm (0.39 in). They are dark reddish brown. The frons and clypeus are coarsely and densely punctured, while the punctuation on the pronotum is less dense and the scutellum has only a few punctures on the apical half.
