= Gnaphalopoda lugubris =

Scientific classification
- Kingdom: Animalia
- Phylum: Arthropoda
- Clade: Pancrustacea
- Class: Insecta
- Order: Coleoptera
- Suborder: Polyphaga
- Infraorder: Scarabaeiformia
- Family: Scarabaeidae
- Genus: Gnaphalopoda
- Species: G. lugubris

Binomial name
- Gnaphalopoda lugubris (Blackburn, 1892)

Synonyms
- Ocnodus lugubris Blackburn, 1892; Ocnodus simplex Lea, 1917

Species of beetle

Gnaphalopoda lugubris is a species of beetle of the family Scarabaeidae. It is found in Australia (Western Australia).

== Description ==
Adults reach a length of about 7.5–10 mm (0.30–0.39 in). They are dark reddish brown. The disc of the pronotum is uniformly punctured, while the scutellum is punctured at the base only. The elytra are regularly punctured in rows and the pygidium is coarsely punctured.
