= Guillaume Vama =

New Caledonian forest farming professional

- Weregnia Vama (young paille)
- Born: c. 1993 (age 32–33); Isle of Pines, New Caledonia
- Occupations: Entrepreneur, agroforestry specialist, activist
- Known for: Founder of association TradTech and pro-independence activism in Kanaky/New Caledonia
- Movement: Kanak independence movement
- Criminal charges: Criminal association ("association de malfaiteurs", "destruction en bande organisée", "complicité de tentative de meurtre sur les forces de l’ordre" in June 2024
- Partner: Hnaéla
- Children: 1, Aïna Vama (daughter)

Guillaume Vama is a New Caledonian agroforestry entrepreneur and activist of Kanak ethnicity. He participated in the pro-independence 2024 New Caledonia unrest and was arrested and incarcerated by the French government in 2024.

== Early life ==
Vama was born and raised on the Isle of Pines, New Caledonia. As a young adult, he participated in the European Solidarity Corps, taking part in a project in Hungary, where he made contact with a Hungarian permaculturalist at a university.

On return to New Caledonia, he obtained a certificat d'aptitude professionnelle at the Chambre d’Agriculture de Nouvelle-Calédonie.

== Career ==
He subsequently founded an association called TRADTECH, to complement modern agroforestry science with traditional techniques, and an association called Agir NC, to encourage entrepreneurship in agroforestry.

== Political activity ==
He was arrested in mid-2024, during the 2024 New Caledonia unrest, and accused by French authorities of being a member of the pro-independence Cellule de coordination des actions de terrain (CCAT). While incarcerated, he was transferred to Bourges, in metropolitan France.

As of February 2025, he remained incarcerated in Bourges.
