= Acridone alkaloids =

Acridone, parent compound of the acridone alkaloids.

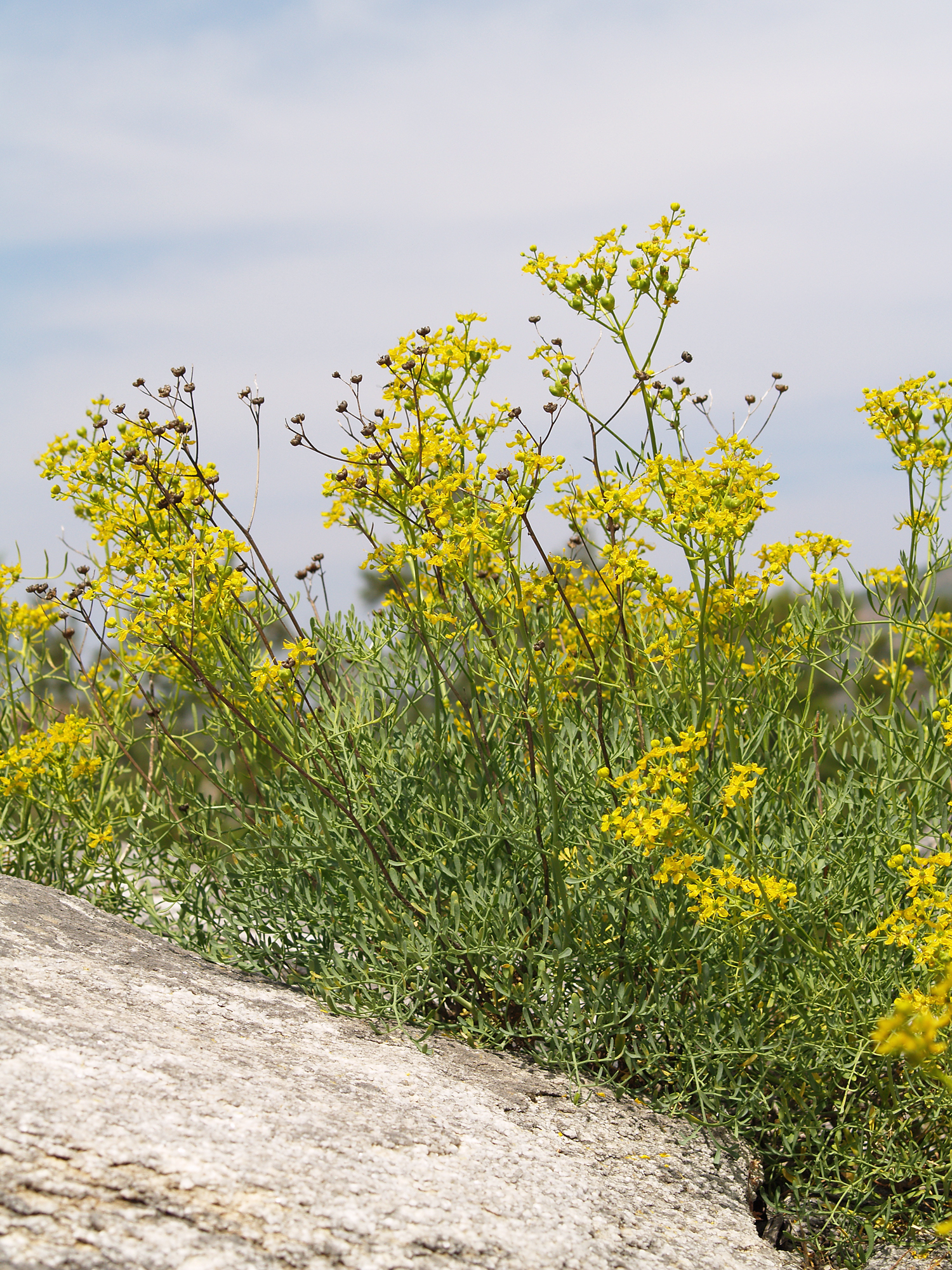
Wine rue (Ruta graveolens)

Acridone alkaloids are natural products derived from acridone.

== Occurrence ==
Acridone alkaloids are found in bark, wood, leaves and roots of rue plants, especially in roots and suspension cultures of rue.

== Examples ==
This group is named after the acridone. Further members are acronycin, melicopicine and rutacridone, among others:

Acronycin

Melicopicine

Rutacridon

== Properties ==
Many acridone alkaloids are methylated on the nitrogen atom and also have two oxygen functional groups, which can be free, alkylated or incorporated into rings. Acridone alkaloids show a blue-green fluorescence so that they can be detected with UV light. Some alkaloids of this group are effective against malaria pathogens. Furthermore, acronycin inhibits cell division.
