= Calmodulin-lysine N-methyltransferase =

Class of enzymes

calmodulin-lysine N-methyltransferase

Identifiers
- EC no.: 2.1.1.60
- CAS no.: 75603-20-2

Databases
- IntEnz: IntEnz view
- BRENDA: BRENDA entry
- ExPASy: NiceZyme view
- KEGG: KEGG entry
- MetaCyc: metabolic pathway
- PRIAM: profile
- PDB structures: RCSB PDB PDBe PDBsum
- Gene Ontology: AmiGO / QuickGO
Search
- PMC: articles
- PubMed: articles
- NCBI: proteins

In enzymology, a calmodulin-lysine N-methyltransferase (EC 2.1.1.60) is an enzyme that catalyzes the chemical reaction

S-adenosyl-L-methionine + calmodulin L-lysine $\rightleftharpoons$ S-adenosyl-L-homocysteine + calmodulin N_{6}-methyl-L-lysine

Thus, the two substrates of this enzyme are S-adenosyl methionine and calmodulin L-lysine, whereas its two products are S-adenosylhomocysteine and calmodulin N6-methyl-L-lysine.

This enzyme belongs to the family of transferases, specifically those transferring one-carbon group methyltransferases. The systematic name of this enzyme class is S-adenosyl-L-methionine:calmodulin-L-lysine N6-methyltransferase. Other names in common use include S-adenosylmethionine:calmodulin (lysine) N-methyltransferase, and S-adenosyl-L-methionine:calmodulin-L-lysine 6-N-methyltransferase. This enzyme participates in lysine degradation.
