= (RS)-1-benzyl-1,2,3,4-tetrahydroisoquinoline N-methyltransferase =

Class of enzymes

Identifiers
- EC no.: 2.1.1.115
- CAS no.: 132084-82-3

Databases
- IntEnz: IntEnz view
- BRENDA: BRENDA entry
- ExPASy: NiceZyme view
- KEGG: KEGG entry
- MetaCyc: metabolic pathway
- PRIAM: profile
- PDB structures: RCSB PDB PDBe PDBsum
- Gene Ontology: AmiGO / QuickGO
Search
- PMC: articles
- PubMed: articles
- NCBI: proteins

In enzymology, a (RS)-1-benzyl-1,2,3,4-tetrahydroisoquinoline N-methyltransferase is an enzyme that catalyzes the chemical reaction:

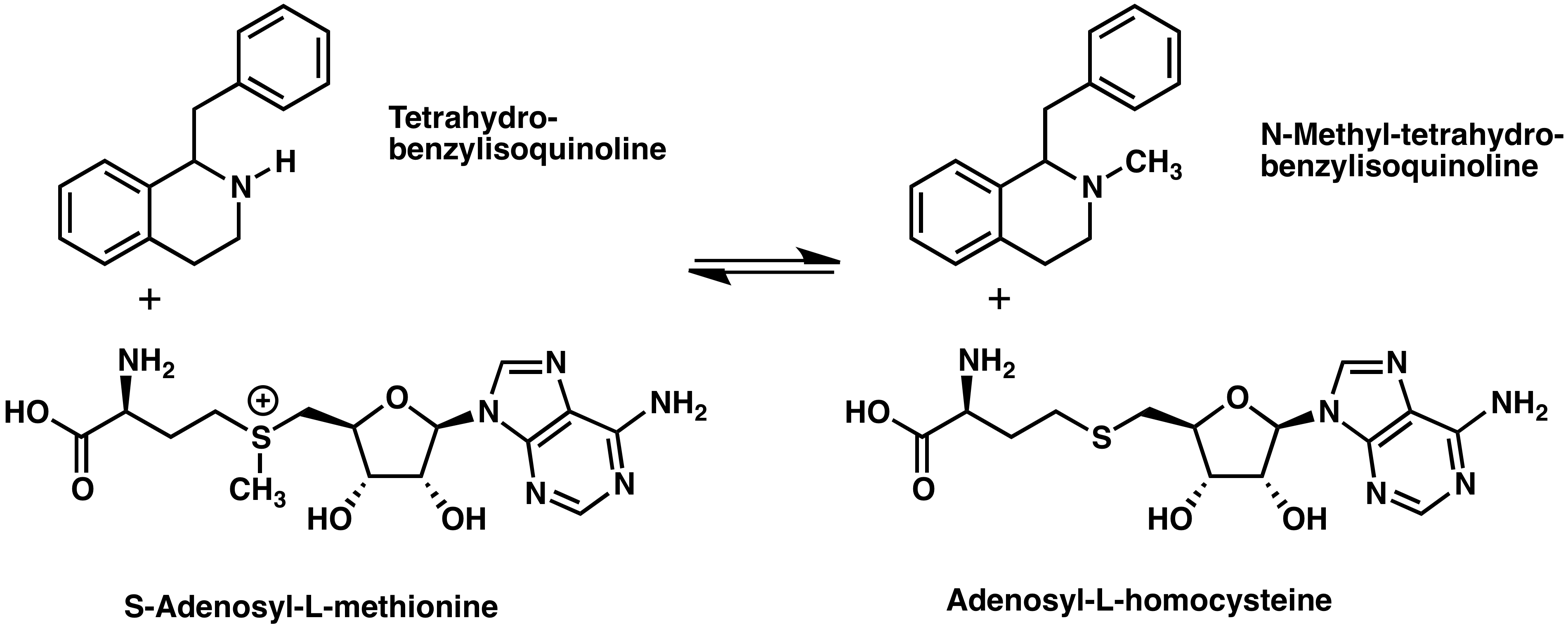

S-adenosyl-L-methionine + (RS)-1-benzyl-1,2,3,4-tetrahydroisoquinoline $\rightleftharpoons$ S-adenosyl-L-homocysteine + N-methyl-(RS)-1-benzyl-1,2,3,4-tetrahydroisoquinoline

This enzyme participates in alkaloid biosynthesis.

== Nomenclature ==
This enzyme belongs to the family of transferases, specifically those transferring one-carbon group methyltransferases. The systematic name of this enzyme class is S-adenosyl-L-methionine:(RS)-1-benzyl-1,2,3,4-tetrahydroisoquinoline N-methyltransferase. This enzyme is also called norreticuline N-methyltransferase.
