= Dimethylhistidine N-methyltransferase =

Class of enzymes

Identifiers
- EC no.: 2.1.1.44
- CAS no.: 62213-53-0

Databases
- IntEnz: IntEnz view
- BRENDA: BRENDA entry
- ExPASy: NiceZyme view
- KEGG: KEGG entry
- MetaCyc: metabolic pathway
- PRIAM: profile
- PDB structures: RCSB PDB PDBe PDBsum
- Gene Ontology: AmiGO / QuickGO
Search
- PMC: articles
- PubMed: articles
- NCBI: proteins

Dimethylhistidine N-methyltransferase (EC 2.1.1.44) is an enzyme that catalyzes a sequence of methylation reactions:

histidine
+ 3 SAM
hercynine
+ 3 SAH

The overall effect is to convert L-histidine to its trimethylated product, hercynine. Both the singly and doubly methylated compounds are also substrates for the reaction. The methyl groups come from the cofactor, S-adenosyl methionine (SAM), which is converted to S-adenosyl-L-homocysteine (SAH).

This enzyme belongs to the family of transferases, specifically those transferring one-carbon group methyltransferases. The systematic name of this enzyme class is S-adenosyl-L-methionine:Nalpha,Nalpha-dimethyl-L-histidine Nalpha-methyltransferase. Other names in common use include dimethylhistidine methyltransferase, histidine-alpha-N-methyltransferase, S-adenosyl-L-methionine:alpha-N,alpha-N-dimethyl-L-histidine, and alpha-N-methyltransferase.

Ergothioneine

In the bacterium Mycobacterium smegmatis, this enzyme is part of the pathway that converts histidine to ergothioneine.
