= Phosphatidyl-N-methylethanolamine N-methyltransferase =

Class of enzymes

phosphatidyl-N-methylethanolamine N-methyltransferase

Identifiers
- EC no.: 2.1.1.71
- CAS no.: 67167-73-1

Databases
- IntEnz: IntEnz view
- BRENDA: BRENDA entry
- ExPASy: NiceZyme view
- KEGG: KEGG entry
- MetaCyc: metabolic pathway
- PRIAM: profile
- PDB structures: RCSB PDB PDBe PDBsum
- Gene Ontology: AmiGO / QuickGO
Search
- PMC: articles
- PubMed: articles
- NCBI: proteins

In enzymology, a phosphatidyl-N-methylethanolamine N-methyltransferase (EC 2.1.1.71) is an enzyme that catalyzes the chemical reaction

S-adenosyl-L-methionine + phosphatidyl-N-methylethanolamine $\rightleftharpoons$ S-adenosyl-L-homocysteine + phosphatidyl-N-dimethylethanolamine

Thus, the two substrates of this enzyme are S-adenosyl methionine and phosphatidyl-N-methylethanolamine, whereas its two products are S-adenosylhomocysteine and phosphatidyl-N-dimethylethanolamine.

This enzyme belongs to the family of transferases, specifically those transferring one-carbon group methyltransferases. The systematic name of this enzyme class is S-adenosyl-L-methionine:phosphatidyl-N-methylethanolamine N-methyltransferase. Other names in common use include phosphatidylmonomethylethanolamine methyltransferase, methyltransferase II, phospholipid methyltransferase, PLMT, phosphatidyl-N-methylethanolamine methyltransferase, phosphatidyl-N-monomethylethanolamine methyltransferase, phosphatidylethanolamine methyltransferase I, and phosphatidylmonomethylethanolamine methyltransferase. This enzyme participates in glycine, serine and threonine metabolism and glycerophospholipid metabolism.
