= Bernthsen acridine synthesis =

Chemical synthesis

The Bernthsen acridine synthesis is the chemical reaction of a diarylamine heated with a carboxylic acid (or acid anhydride) and zinc chloride to form a 9-substituted acridine.

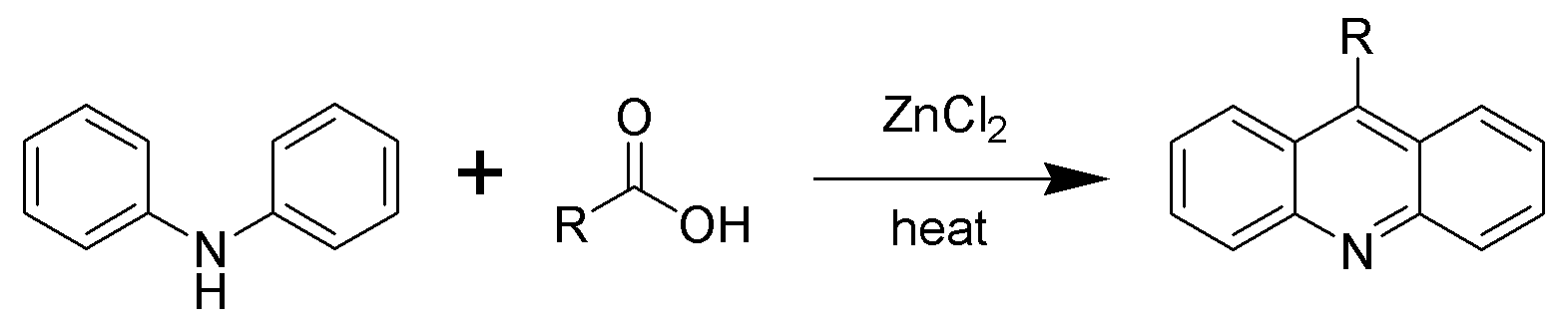
The Bernthsen acridine synthesis

Using zinc chloride, one must heat the reaction to 200-270 °C for 24hrs. The use of polyphosphoric acid will give acridine products at a lower temperature, but also with decreased yields.
