= Pyridine N-methyltransferase =

Class of enzymes

Identifiers
- EC no.: 2.1.1.87
- CAS no.: 104327-10-8

Databases
- IntEnz: IntEnz view
- BRENDA: BRENDA entry
- ExPASy: NiceZyme view
- KEGG: KEGG entry
- MetaCyc: metabolic pathway
- PRIAM: profile
- PDB structures: RCSB PDB PDBe PDBsum
- Gene Ontology: AmiGO / QuickGO
Search
- PMC: articles
- PubMed: articles
- NCBI: proteins

Pyridine N-methyltransferase (EC 2.1.1.87) is an enzyme that catalyzes the chemical reaction

pyridine
+ SAM
methylpyridinium
+ SAH

This is a methylation reaction in which pyridine is converted to methylpyridinium cation. The methyl group comes from the cofactor, S-adenosyl methionine (SAM), which becomes S-adenosyl-L-homocysteine (SAH).

This enzyme belongs to the family of transferases, specifically those transferring one-carbon group methyltransferases. The systematic name of this enzyme class is S-adenosyl-L-methionine:pyridine N-methyltransferase. This enzyme is also called pyridine methyltransferase.
