= Gnaphalopoda seriata =

Scientific classification
- Kingdom: Animalia
- Phylum: Arthropoda
- Clade: Pancrustacea
- Class: Insecta
- Order: Coleoptera
- Suborder: Polyphaga
- Infraorder: Scarabaeiformia
- Family: Scarabaeidae
- Genus: Gnaphalopoda
- Species: G. seriata

Binomial name
- Gnaphalopoda seriata Fauvel, 1903

Species of beetle

Gnaphalopoda seriata is a species of beetle of the family Scarabaeidae. It is found in New Caledonia.

== Description ==
Adults reach a length of about 9–10 mm (0.35–0.39 in). They are very bright, black-piceous or piceous, sometimes almost bronzed, with the head and thorax sometimes blackish. The head is sparsely punctate and the pronotum is densely and strongly punctate, with the anterior margin subtly sinuate. The elytra are not densely, but strongly punctate in lines.
