= Protein-histidine N-methyltransferase =

Class of enzymes

protein-histidine N-methyltransferase

Identifiers
- EC no.: 2.1.1.85
- CAS no.: 108022-17-9

Databases
- IntEnz: IntEnz view
- BRENDA: BRENDA entry
- ExPASy: NiceZyme view
- KEGG: KEGG entry
- MetaCyc: metabolic pathway
- PRIAM: profile
- PDB structures: RCSB PDB PDBe PDBsum
- Gene Ontology: AmiGO / QuickGO
Search
- PMC: articles
- PubMed: articles
- NCBI: proteins

In enzymology, a protein-histidine N-methyltransferase (EC 2.1.1.85) is an enzyme that catalyzes the chemical reaction

S-adenosyl-L-methionine + protein L-histidine $\rightleftharpoons$ S-adenosyl-L-homocysteine + protein Ntau-methyl-L-histidine

Thus, the two substrates of this enzyme are S-adenosyl methionine and protein L-histidine, whereas its two products are S-adenosylhomocysteine and protein Ntau-methyl-L-histidine.

This enzyme belongs to the family of transferases, specifically those transferring one-carbon group methyltransferases. The systematic name of this enzyme class is S-adenosyl-L-methionine:protein-L-histidine N-tele-methyltransferase. Other names in common use include protein methylase IV, protein (histidine) methyltransferase, actin-specific histidine methyltransferase, and S-adenosyl methionine:protein-histidine N-methyltransferase.
