= (cytochrome c)-lysine N-methyltransferase =

Class of enzymes

[cytochrome c]-lysine N-methyltransferase

Identifiers
- EC no.: 2.1.1.59
- CAS no.: 82047-78-7

Databases
- IntEnz: IntEnz view
- BRENDA: BRENDA entry
- ExPASy: NiceZyme view
- KEGG: KEGG entry
- MetaCyc: metabolic pathway
- PRIAM: profile
- PDB structures: RCSB PDB PDBe PDBsum
- Gene Ontology: AmiGO / QuickGO
Search
- PMC: articles
- PubMed: articles
- NCBI: proteins

In enzymology, a [cytochrome c]-lysine N-methyltransferase (EC 2.1.1.59) is an enzyme that catalyzes the chemical reaction

S-adenosyl-L-methionine + [cytochrome c]-L-lysine $\rightleftharpoons$ S-adenosyl-L-homocysteine + [cytochrome c]-N_{6}-methyl-L-lysine

Thus, the two substrates of this enzyme are S-adenosyl methionine and cytochrome c-L-lysine, whereas its two products are S-adenosylhomocysteine and cytochrome c-N6-methyl-L-lysine.

This enzyme belongs to the family of transferases, specifically those transferring one-carbon group methyltransferases. The systematic name of this enzyme class is S-adenosyl-L-methionine:[cytochrome c]-L-lysine N6-methyltransferase. Other names in common use include cytochrome c (lysine) methyltransferase, cytochrome c methyltransferase, cytochrome c-specific protein methylase III, cytochrome c-specific protein-lysine methyltransferase, S-adenosyl-L-methionine:[cytochrome c]-L-lysine, and 6-N-methyltransferase. This enzyme participates in lysine degradation.
