= (cytochrome c)-arginine N-methyltransferase =

Class of enzymes

[cytochrome c]-arginine N-methyltransferase

Identifiers
- EC no.: 2.1.1.124
- CAS no.: 9055-07-6

Databases
- IntEnz: IntEnz view
- BRENDA: BRENDA entry
- ExPASy: NiceZyme view
- KEGG: KEGG entry
- MetaCyc: metabolic pathway
- PRIAM: profile
- PDB structures: RCSB PDB PDBe PDBsum
- Gene Ontology: AmiGO / QuickGO
Search
- PMC: articles
- PubMed: articles
- NCBI: proteins

In enzymology, a [cytochrome c]-arginine N-methyltransferase (EC 2.1.1.124) is an enzyme that catalyzes the chemical reaction

S-adenosyl-L-methionine + [cytochrome c]-arginine $\rightleftharpoons$ S-adenosyl-L-homocysteine + [cytochrome c]-Nomega-methyl-arginine

Thus, the two substrates of this enzyme are S-adenosyl methionine and cytochrome c-arginine, whereas its two products are S-adenosylhomocysteine and cytochrome c-Nomega-methyl-arginine.

This enzyme belongs to the family of transferases, specifically those transferring one-carbon group methyltransferases. The systematic name of this enzyme class is S-adenosyl-L-methionine:[cytochrome c]-arginine Nomega-methyltransferase. Other names in common use include S-adenosyl-L-methionine:[cytochrome c]-arginine, and omega-N-methyltransferase.
