= Phosphoethanolamine N-methyltransferase =

Class of enzymes

Identifiers
- EC no.: 2.1.1.103
- CAS no.: 171040-79-2

Databases
- IntEnz: IntEnz view
- BRENDA: BRENDA entry
- ExPASy: NiceZyme view
- KEGG: KEGG entry
- MetaCyc: metabolic pathway
- PRIAM: profile
- PDB structures: RCSB PDB PDBe PDBsum
- Gene Ontology: AmiGO / QuickGO
Search
- PMC: articles
- PubMed: articles
- NCBI: proteins

Phosphoethanolamine N-methyltransferase (EC 2.1.1.103) is an enzyme that catalyzes the chemical reaction

phosphorylethanolamine
+ SAM
N-methylethanolamine phosphate
+ SAH

This is a methylation reaction in which the phosphorylethanolamine is converted to N-methylethanolamine phosphate. The methyl group comes from the cofactor, S-adenosyl methionine (SAM), which becomes S-adenosyl-L-homocysteine (SAH).

This enzyme belongs to the family of transferases, specifically those transferring one-carbon group methyltransferases. The systematic name of this enzyme class is S-adenosyl-L-methionine:ethanolamine-phosphate N-methyltransferase. This enzyme is also called phosphoethanolamine methyltransferase. It is part of the biosynthetic pathway to phosphocholine.
