= Acridone synthase =

Class of enzymes

Identifiers
- EC no.: 2.3.1.159
- CAS no.: 99085-53-7

Databases
- IntEnz: IntEnz view
- BRENDA: BRENDA entry
- ExPASy: NiceZyme view
- KEGG: KEGG entry
- MetaCyc: metabolic pathway
- PRIAM: profile
- PDB structures: RCSB PDB PDBe PDBsum
- Gene Ontology: AmiGO / QuickGO
Search
- PMC: articles
- PubMed: articles
- NCBI: proteins

Acridone synthase (EC 2.3.1.159) is an enzyme that catalyzes the chemical reaction

N-methylanthraniloyl-CoA
+ 3
malonyl-CoA
3 CO_{2}
1,3-dihydroxy-N-methylacridone
+ 4
coenzyme A

The enzyme combines one unit of N-methylanthraniloyl-CoA with three of malonyl-CoA to produce one unit of 1,3-dihydroxy-N-methylacridone. Four units of coenzyme A and three of carbon dioxide are byproducts of this polyketide synthesis which leads to rutacridone. The enzyme was characterised from the plant Ruta graveolens.

This enzyme belongs to the family of transferases, specifically those acyltransferases transferring groups other than aminoacyl groups. The systematic name of this enzyme class is malonyl-CoA:N-methylanthraniloyl-CoA malonyltransferase (cyclizing).
