= Trimethylsulfonium—tetrahydrofolate N-methyltransferase =

Class of enzymes

trimethylsulfonium-tetrahydrofolate N-methyltransferase

Identifiers
- EC no.: 2.1.1.19
- CAS no.: 37256-92-1

Databases
- IntEnz: IntEnz view
- BRENDA: BRENDA entry
- ExPASy: NiceZyme view
- KEGG: KEGG entry
- MetaCyc: metabolic pathway
- PRIAM: profile
- PDB structures: RCSB PDB PDBe PDBsum
- Gene Ontology: AmiGO / QuickGO
Search
- PMC: articles
- PubMed: articles
- NCBI: proteins

In enzymology, a trimethylsulfonium-tetrahydrofolate N-methyltransferase (EC 2.1.1.19) is an enzyme that catalyzes the chemical reaction

trimethylsulfonium + tetrahydrofolate $\rightleftharpoons$ dimethylsulfide + 5-methyltetrahydrofolate

Thus, the two substrates of this enzyme are trimethylsulfonium and tetrahydrofolate, whereas its two products are dimethyl sulfide and 5-methyltetrahydrofolate.

This enzyme belongs to the family of transferases, specifically those transferring one-carbon group methyltransferases. The systematic name of this enzyme class is trimethylsulfonium:tetrahydrofolate N-methyltransferase. This enzyme is also called trimethylsulfonium-tetrahydrofolate methyltransferase. This enzyme participates in one carbon pool by folate.
