= Carnosine N-methyltransferase =

Class of enzymes

Identifiers
- EC no.: 2.1.1.22
- CAS no.: 37256-93-2

Databases
- IntEnz: IntEnz view
- BRENDA: BRENDA entry
- ExPASy: NiceZyme view
- KEGG: KEGG entry
- MetaCyc: metabolic pathway
- PRIAM: profile
- PDB structures: RCSB PDB PDBe PDBsum
- Gene Ontology: AmiGO / QuickGO
Search
- PMC: articles
- PubMed: articles
- NCBI: proteins

Carnosine N-methyltransferase (EC 2.1.1.22) is an enzyme that catalyzes the chemical reaction

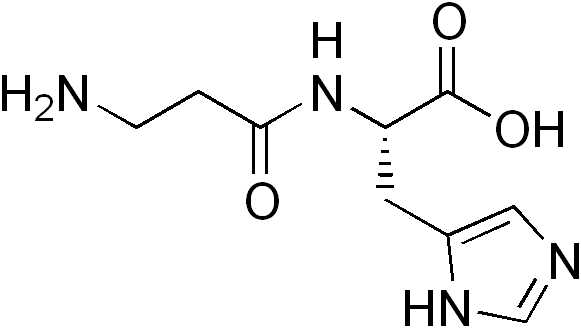
carnosine
+ SAM
anserine
+ SAH

This is a methylation reaction in which carnosine is converted to anserine. The methyl group comes from the cofactor, S-adenosyl methionine (SAM), which loses its methyl group and becomes S-adenosyl-L-homocysteine (SAH).

This enzyme belongs to the family of transferases, specifically those transferring one-carbon group methyltransferases. The systematic name of this enzyme class is S-adenosyl-L-methionine:carnosine N-methyltransferase. This enzyme participates in histidine metabolism.

== Gene ==
The genes encoding carnosine N-methyltransferase activity have been identified by Jakub Drozak and coworkers in 2013 and 2015. In birds and reptiles, the enzyme is encoded by histamine N-methyltransferase-like gene (HNMT-like). Importantly, the HNMT-like gene is absent from available mammalian genomes and in mammalian species, the formation of anserine is catalyzed by methyltransferase that is unrelated to the reptilian and avian enzyme and encoded by C9orf41/UPF0586 gene.

== Protein nomenclature ==
Currently, the avian-reptilian enzyme encoded by HNMT-like gene is labeled as carnosine N-methyltransferase 2 in public databases, while the mammalian methyltransferase is named carnosine N-methyltransferase 1 (CARNMT1).
