= Methylamine—glutamate N-methyltransferase =

Class of enzymes

Methylamine-glutamate N-methyltransferase

Identifiers
- EC no.: 2.1.1.21
- CAS no.: 9045-32-3

Databases
- IntEnz: IntEnz view
- BRENDA: BRENDA entry
- ExPASy: NiceZyme view
- KEGG: KEGG entry
- MetaCyc: metabolic pathway
- PRIAM: profile
- PDB structures: RCSB PDB PDBe PDBsum
- Gene Ontology: AmiGO / QuickGO
Search
- PMC: articles
- PubMed: articles
- NCBI: proteins

Methylamine-glutamate N-methyltransferase (EC 2.1.1.21) is an enzyme that catalyzes the chemical reaction

L-glutamic acid
CH_{3}NH_{2}
NH_{3}
CH_{3}NH_{2}
NH_{3}
N-Methyl-L-glutamic acid

The two substrates of this enzyme are methylamine and L-glutamic acid. Its products are ammonia and N-methyl-L-glutamic acid.

This enzyme belongs to the family of transferases, specifically those transferring one-carbon group methyltransferases. The systematic name of this enzyme class is methylamine:l-glutamate N-methyltransferase. Other names in common use include N-methylglutamate synthase, and methylamine-glutamate methyltransferase. This enzyme participates in methane metabolism.
