= Gnaphalopoda unidentata =

Scientific classification
- Kingdom: Animalia
- Phylum: Arthropoda
- Clade: Pancrustacea
- Class: Insecta
- Order: Coleoptera
- Suborder: Polyphaga
- Infraorder: Scarabaeiformia
- Family: Scarabaeidae
- Genus: Gnaphalopoda
- Species: G. unidentata

Binomial name
- Gnaphalopoda unidentata (Lea, 1917)

Synonyms
- Ocnodus unidentatus Lea, 1917

Species of beetle

Gnaphalopoda unidentata is a species of beetle of the family Scarabaeidae. It is found in Australia (Queensland, Western Australia, Northern Territory).

== Description ==
Adults reach a length of about 7.5 mm (0.30 in). They are dark reddish brown. The pronotum is uniformly punctured and the scutellum is punctured except at the apex. The elytra are punctured with the same density as the pronotum and the pygidium is coarsely punctured.
