= Gnaphalopoda suspiciosa =

Scientific classification
- Kingdom: Animalia
- Phylum: Arthropoda
- Clade: Pancrustacea
- Class: Insecta
- Order: Coleoptera
- Suborder: Polyphaga
- Infraorder: Scarabaeiformia
- Family: Scarabaeidae
- Genus: Gnaphalopoda
- Species: G. suspiciosa

Binomial name
- Gnaphalopoda suspiciosa (Blackburn, 1907)

Synonyms
- Ocnodus suspiciosus Blackburn, 1907

Species of beetle

Gnaphalopoda suspiciosa is a species of beetle of the family Scarabaeidae. It is found in Australia (Western Australia).

== Description ==
Adults reach a length of about 7.5–10 mm (0.30–0.39 in). They are dark reddish brown to piceous. The elytra are punctured in longitudinal rows, while the scutellum fine punctures at the base but has unpunctured lateral and apical margins. The pygidium is coarsely punctured.
