= (Myelin basic protein)-arginine N-methyltransferase =

Class of enzymes

[myelin basic protein]-arginine N-methyltransferase

Identifiers
- EC no.: 2.1.1.126
- CAS no.: 9055-07-6

Databases
- IntEnz: IntEnz view
- BRENDA: BRENDA entry
- ExPASy: NiceZyme view
- KEGG: KEGG entry
- MetaCyc: metabolic pathway
- PRIAM: profile
- PDB structures: RCSB PDB PDBe PDBsum
- Gene Ontology: AmiGO / QuickGO
Search
- PMC: articles
- PubMed: articles
- NCBI: proteins

In enzymology, a [myelin basic protein]-arginine N-methyltransferase (EC 2.1.1.126) is an enzyme that catalyzes the chemical reaction

S-adenosyl-L-methionine + [myelin basic protein]-arginine $\rightleftharpoons$ S-adenosyl-L-homocysteine + [myelin basic protein]-Nomega-methyl-arginine

Thus, the two substrates of this enzyme are S-adenosyl methionine and myelin basic protein-arginine, whereas its two products are S-adenosylhomocysteine and myelin basic protein-Nomega-methyl-arginine.

This enzyme belongs to the family of transferases, specifically those transferring one-carbon group methyltransferases. The systematic name of this enzyme class is S-adenosyl-L-methionine:[myelin-basic-protein]-arginine Nomega-methyltransferase. Other names in common use include myelin basic protein methylase I, protein methylase I, S-adenosyl-L-methionine:[myelin-basic-protein]-arginine, and omega-N-methyltransferase.
