= Gnaphalopoda scissiceps =

Scientific classification
- Kingdom: Animalia
- Phylum: Arthropoda
- Clade: Pancrustacea
- Class: Insecta
- Order: Coleoptera
- Suborder: Polyphaga
- Infraorder: Scarabaeiformia
- Family: Scarabaeidae
- Genus: Gnaphalopoda
- Species: G. scissiceps

Binomial name
- Gnaphalopoda scissiceps (Blackburn, 1907)

Synonyms
- Ocnodus scissiceps Blackburn, 1907

Species of beetle

Gnaphalopoda scissiceps is a species of beetle of the family Scarabaeidae. It is found in Australia (Western Australia, South Australia).

== Description ==
Adults reach a length of about 9 mm (0.35 in). The body is dark reddish brown. The clypeus, pronotum and scutellum have circular punctures. The latter with a median unpunctured stripe. The elytra are densely and uniformly punctured, while the pygidium is coarsely and irregularly punctured.
