= Gnaphalopoda carnei =

Scientific classification
- Kingdom: Animalia
- Phylum: Arthropoda
- Clade: Pancrustacea
- Class: Insecta
- Order: Coleoptera
- Suborder: Polyphaga
- Infraorder: Scarabaeiformia
- Family: Scarabaeidae
- Genus: Gnaphalopoda
- Species: G. carnei

Binomial name
- Gnaphalopoda carnei Britton, 1987

Species of beetle

Gnaphalopoda carnei is a species of beetle of the family Scarabaeidae. It is found in Australia (Victoria, the Australian Capital Territory).

== Description ==
Adults reach a length of about 8–9 mm (0.31–0.35 in). They are dark reddish brown to piceous. The pronotum is uniformly and sparsely punctured, while the scutellum has fine punctures on each side of a median unpunctured area. The elytra are as in Gnaphalopoda suspiciosa and the pygidium is coarsely punctured.
