= Acridone =

Names
- Preferred IUPAC name Acridin-9(10H)-one
- Other names 9-Acridanone

Identifiers
CAS Number	578-95-0
3D model (JSmol)	Interactive image; Interactive image
ChEBI	CHEBI:50756
ChEMBL	ChEMBL436589
ChemSpider	10188539
ECHA InfoCard	100.008.578
PubChem CID	2015
UNII	6BK306GUQA
CompTox Dashboard (EPA)	DTXSID8060371
- InChI: InChI=1S/C13H9NO/c15-13-9-5-1-3-7-11(9)14-12-8-4-2-6-10(12)13/h1-8H,(H,14,15) Key: FZEYVTFCMJSGMP-UHFFFAOYSA-N; InChI=1/C13H9NO/c15-13-9-5-1-3-7-11(9)14-12-8-4-2-6-10(12)13/h1-8H,(H,14,15) Key: FZEYVTFCMJSGMP-UHFFFAOYAI
- SMILES: C1=CC=C2C(=C1)C(=O)C3=CC=CC=C3N2; O=C1c3ccccc3Nc2ccccc12

Properties
Chemical formula	C_{13}H_{9}NO
Molar mass	195.221 g·mol^{−1}
Appearance	yellow powder
Melting point	250 °C (482 °F; 523 K)
- Except where otherwise noted, data are given for materials in their standard state (at 25 °C [77 °F], 100 kPa). verify (what is ?) Infobox references

Acridone is an organic compound based on the acridine skeleton, with a carbonyl group at the 9 position.

== Synthesis and structure ==
The molecule is planar. Optical spectra reveal that the keto tautomer predominates in the gas-phase and in ethanol solution.

Acridone itself can be synthesized by heating fenamic acid.

Acridones in general can be synthesized by several routes. One classic method for the synthesis of acridones is the Lehmstedt–Tanasescu reaction, a reaction between a 2-nitrobenzaldehyde (1) and an arene compound (2) in the presence of an acidic nitrous acid:

In enzymology, an acridone synthase (EC 2.3.1.159) is an enzyme that catalyzes the chemical reaction

3 malonyl-CoA + N-methylanthraniloyl-CoA ⇌ 4 CoA + 1,3-dihydroxy-N-methylacridone + 3 CO_{2}

Thus, the two substrates of this enzyme are malonyl-CoA and N-methylanthraniloyl-CoA, whereas its three products are CoA, 1,3-dihydroxy-N-methylacridone, and CO_{2}.

== History ==
One of the first who were able to prove the compound's existence was Karl Drechsler, Student of G. Goldschmiedt, at the k.u.k. Universität Wien (Vienna, Austria) in 1914.

== Derivatives ==
Acridone constitutes the scaffold of some synthetic compounds with diverse pharmacological activities. 3-Chloro-6-(2-diethylamino-ethoxy)-10-(2-diethylamino-ethyl)-acridone has shown promise as an antimalarial drug.

== See also ==
- Quinacridone
