= Isle of Pines (island) =

Pacific island of New Caledonia

Native name: French: Île des Pins Numèè: Kunyié Nickname: l'île la plus proche du paradis
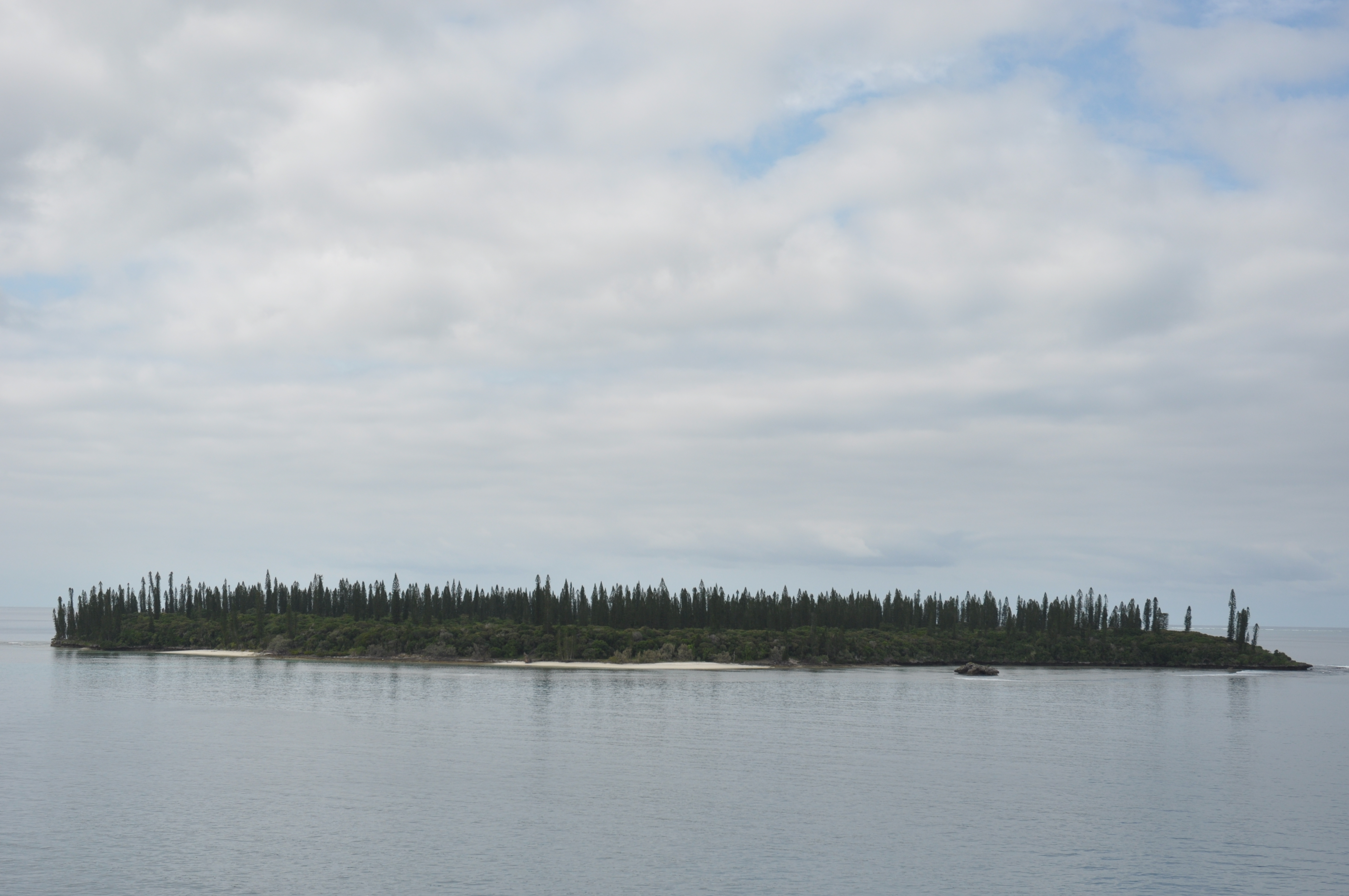
- Ile Bayonnaise, Isle of Pines, New Caledonia

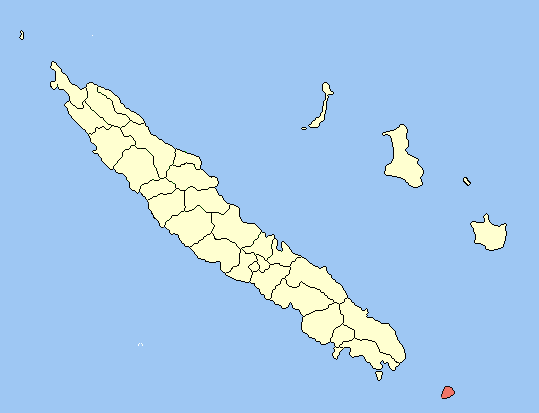
- Location southeast of Grande Terre

Geography
- Archipelago: New Caledonia
- Length: 15 km (9.3 mi)
- Width: 13 km (8.1 mi)
- Highest elevation: 262 m (860 ft)
- Highest point: pic Nga

Administration
- France

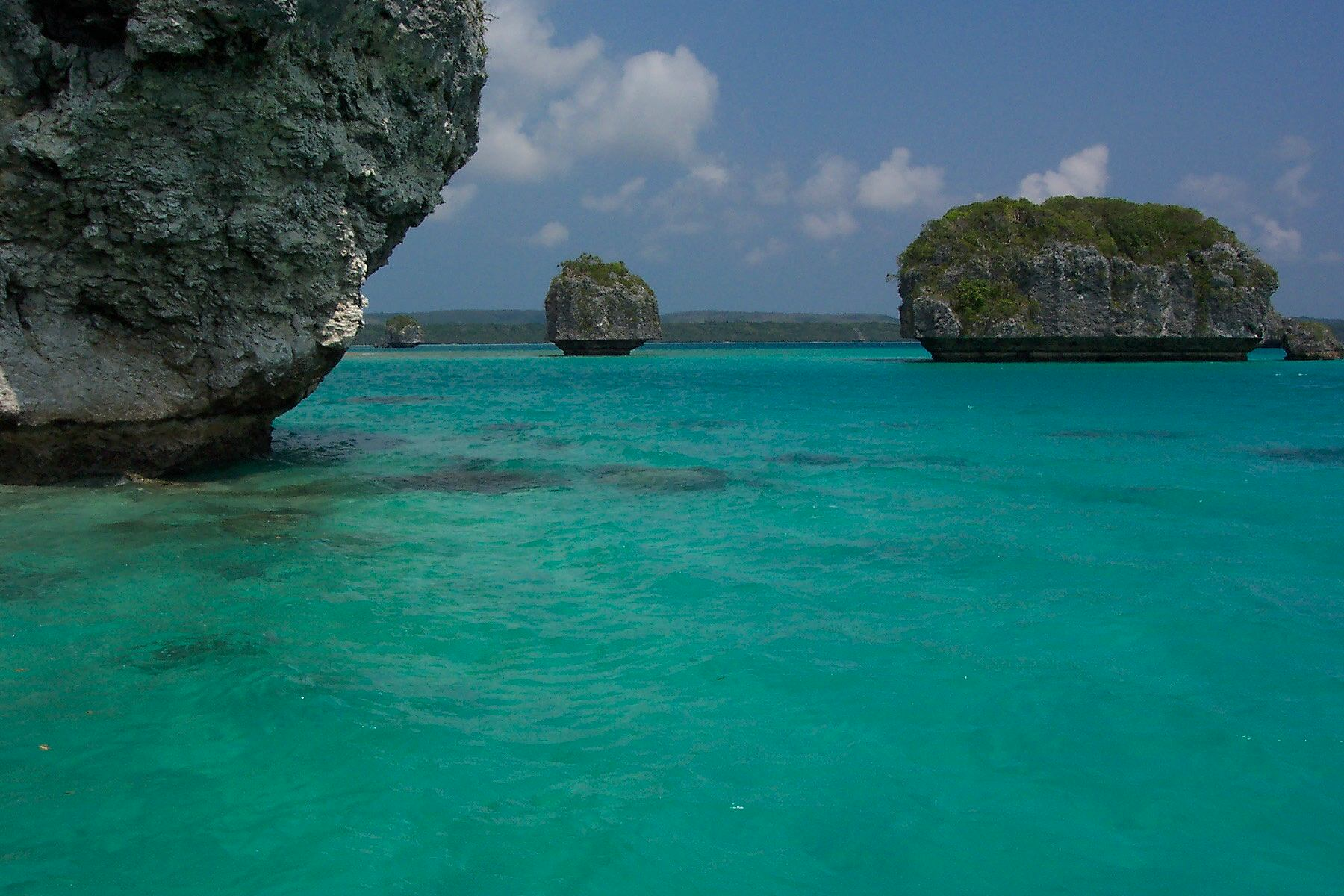
Upi Bay, Isle of Pines, New Caledonia

The Isle of Pines (French: Île des Pins, pronounced [il de pɛ̃]; Numèè: Kwényï, Dehu: Kunie) is an island in the Pacific Ocean, in the archipelago of New Caledonia, an overseas collectivity of France. The island is part of the commune (municipality) of L'Île-des-Pins, in the South Province of New Caledonia. The Isle of Pines is nicknamed l'île la plus proche du paradis ("the closest island to Paradise").

The island is around 22°37′S 167°29′E and measures 15 km (9.3 mi) by 13 km (8.1 mi). It lies southeast of Grande Terre, New Caledonia's main island, and is 100 kilometres (62 mi) southeast of the capital Nouméa. There is one airport (IATA: ILP, ICAO: NWWE) with a 1,250 m (4,100 ft) runway. The Isle of Pines is surrounded by the New Caledonia Barrier Reef.

The inhabitants of the island are mainly native Melanesian Kanaks, and the population is 2,000 (estimated 2006) (1989 population 1,465).

The island is rich with animal life and is home to unusual creatures such as the crested gecko Correlophus ciliatus and the world's largest gecko, Rhacodactylus leachianus.

The pic Nga is the island's highest point, at 262 metres (860 ft) elevation. River Ouro is the longest river.

== History ==
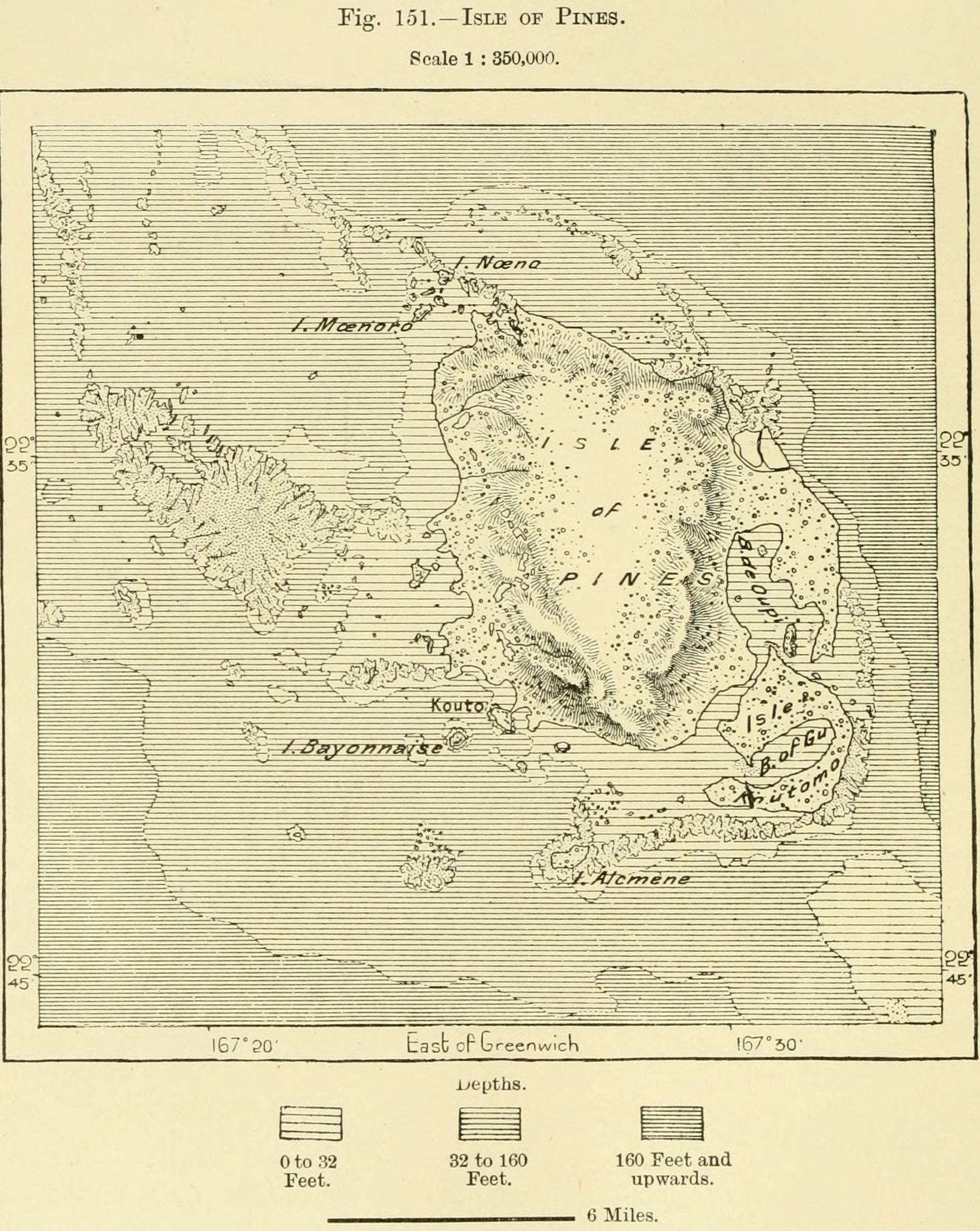
1890 map

Melanesian people lived on the island for over 2000 years before the island was first visited by Europeans. Captain James Cook in 1774 saw the island and renamed it on his second voyage to New Zealand. Cook gave the island its name after seeing the tall native pines (Araucaria columnaris). He never disembarked onto the island, but as he saw signs of inhabitance (smoke) assumed it was inhabited. In the 1840s, Protestant and Catholic missionaries arrived, along with merchants seeking sandalwood.

The French took possession of the island in 1853 at which time the native Kunies converted to the Catholic religion. In 1872, the island became a French penal colony, home to 3,000 political deportees from the Paris Commune.

== Sights ==
The ruins of a penal colony can be seen in the village of Ouro in the west of the island. The water tower of Ouro which was built by prisoners in 1874/75 and renovated in 2005 is still used.

At the cemetery Cimetière des Déportés near Ouro is a pyramid-shaped memorial and the graves of 300 deportees who died between 1872 and 1880.

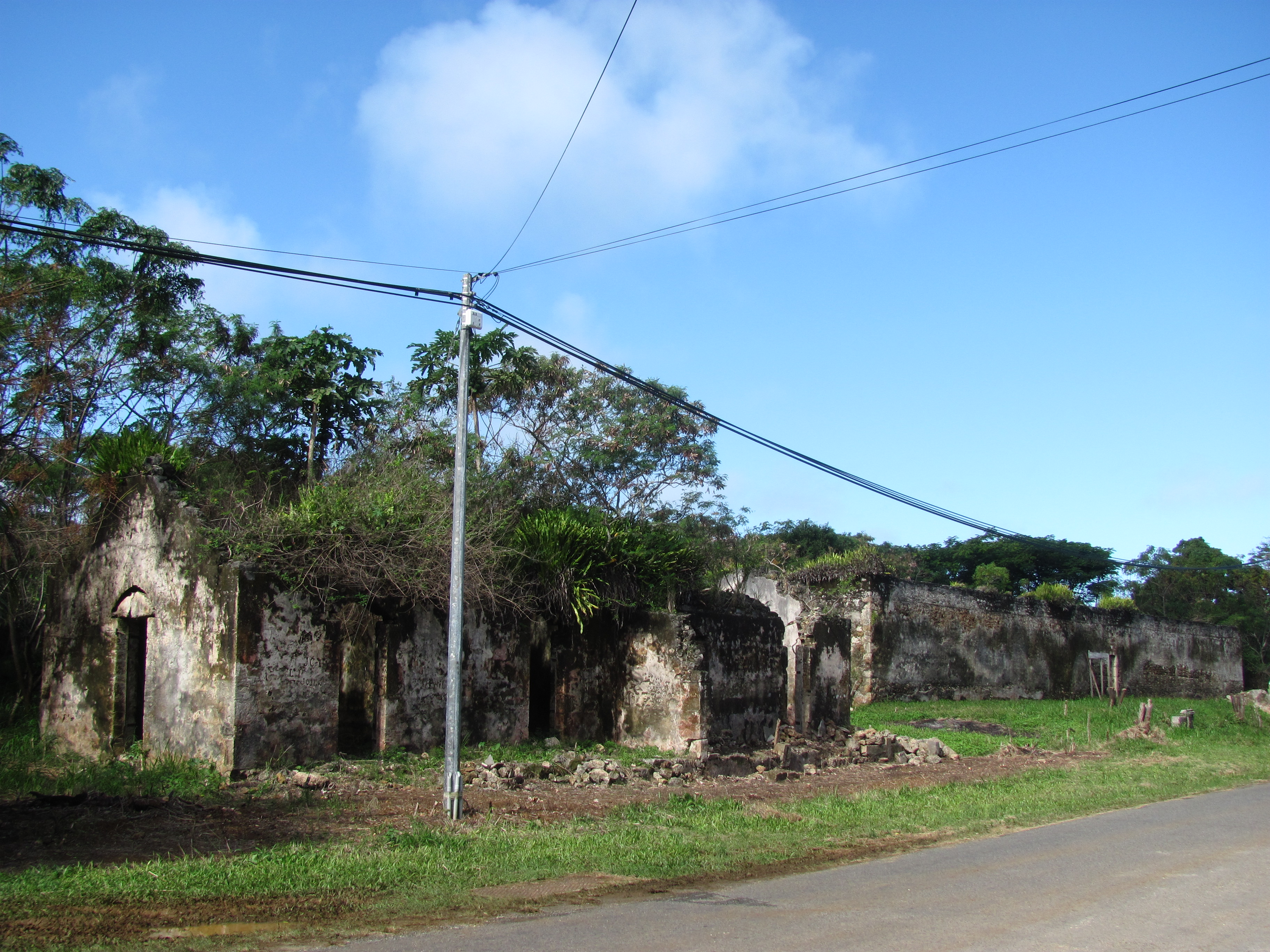
Ruins of the penal colony in Ouro

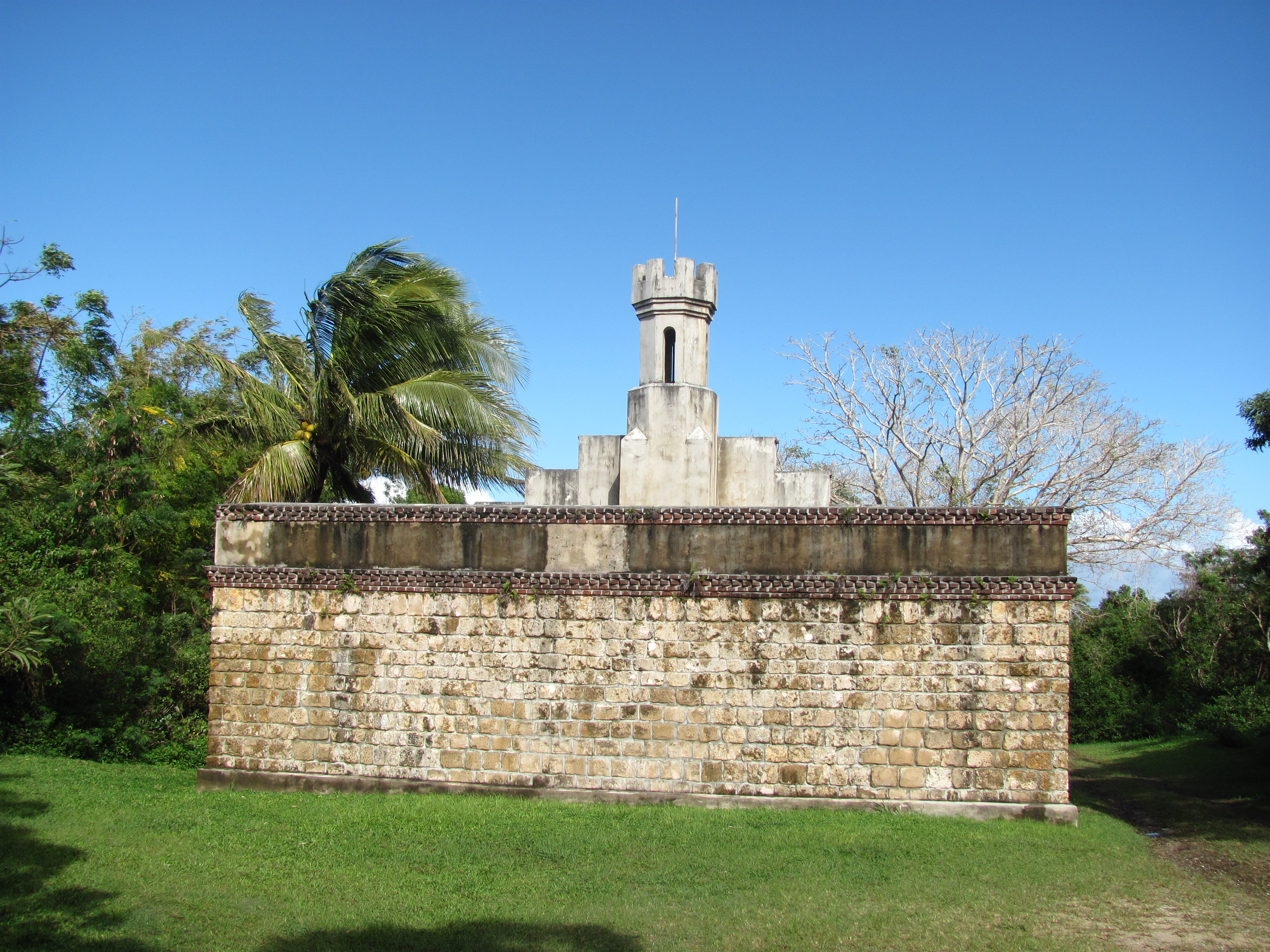
Water tower in Ouro

== Archaeology ==
Scattered across the central plateau of the island lie more than 300 poorly understood mounds, some of which have been excavated and found to have concrete cores. No human remains or man-made objects have been found in the mounds; one snail shell embedded in excavated concrete was carbon-dated to 12,900 ± 450 years old. Much as with the American mima mounds, there is no consensus on what these mounds are, and proposed explanations have included Paleolithic, Neolithic or later human construction, natural formations, or prehistoric birds’ nests, specifically of the extinct species Sylviornis neocaledoniae.

== Notable people ==
- Guillaume Vama, Kanak insurrectionist and agroforestry entrepreneur
