= List of Xylosma species =

Xylosma is a widespread genus of plants native to tropical and subtropical parts of Asia, the Americas, and the Pacific.

== Extant species ==
The following 113 species of Xylosma are accepted by Plants of the World Online as of November 2026:

=== A-E ===
- Xylosma acunae Borhidi & O.Muñiz
- Xylosma avilae Sleumer
- Xylosma bahamensis (Britton) Standl.
- Xylosma benthamii (Tul.) Triana & Planch.
- Xylosma bernardiana Sleumer
- Xylosma boliviana Sleumer
- Xylosma boulindae Sleumer
- Xylosma brachystachys Craib
- Xylosma buxifolia A.Gray
- Xylosma capillipes Guillaumin
- Xylosma characantha Standl.
- Xylosma chiapensis Lundell
- Xylosma chlorantha Donn.Sm.
- Xylosma ciliatifolia (Clos) Eichler
- Xylosma cinerea (Clos) Hemsl.
- Xylosma claraensis Urb.
- Xylosma confusa Guillaumin
- Xylosma congesta (Lour.) Merr.
- Xylosma controversa Clos
- Xylosma cordata (Kunth) Gilg
- Xylosma cordifolia (Sleumer) Pillon
- Xylosma coriacea (Poit.) Eichler
- Xylosma craynii W.E.Cooper
- Xylosma crenata (H.St.John) H.St.John
- Xylosma domingensis (Urb.) M.H.Alford
- Xylosma dothioensis Guillaumin
- Xylosma elegans (Tul.) Triana & Planch.

=== F-L ===
- Xylosma fasciculata Guillaumin
- Xylosma fawcettii Urb.
- Xylosma flexuosa (Kunth) Hemsl.
- Xylosma gigantifolia Sleumer
- Xylosma glaberrima Sleumer
- Xylosma glaucescens Urb.
- Xylosma grossecrenata (Sleumer) Lescot
- Xylosma guillauminii Sleumer
- Xylosma hawaiensis Seem.
- Xylosma hispidula Standl.
- Xylosma horrida Rose
- Xylosma hurlimannii Guillaumin
- Xylosma iberiensis J.E.Gut.
- Xylosma inaequinervia Sleumer
- Xylosma intermedia (Seem.) Triana & Planch.
- Xylosma kaalaensis Sleumer
- Xylosma koghiensis Guillaumin
- Xylosma lancifolia Sleumer
- Xylosma lifuana Guillaumin
- Xylosma lineolata Urb. & Ekman
- Xylosma longifolia Clos
- Xylosma longipedicellata A.Pool
- Xylosma longipetiolata Legname
- Xylosma lucida (Tul.) Sleumer
- Xylosma luzonensis Clos

=== M-Q ===
- Xylosma maidenii Sleumer
- Xylosma mandjeliana (Sleumer) Pillon
- Xylosma martinicensis (Krug & Urb.) Urb.
- Xylosma molesta Sleumer
- Xylosma nelsonii Merr.
- Xylosma nervosa Guillaumin
- Xylosma nipensis Borhidi
- Xylosma nitida (Hell.) A.Gray ex Griseb.
- Xylosma obovata (H.Karst.) Triana & Planch.
- Xylosma oligandra Donn.Sm.
- Xylosma orbiculata (J.R.Forst. & G.Forst.) G.Forst.
- Xylosma ovata Benth.
- Xylosma pachyphylla (Krug & Urb.) Urb.
- Xylosma palawanensis Mend.
- Xylosma panamensis Turcz.
- Xylosma pancheri Guillaumin
- Xylosma papuana Gilg
- Xylosma parvifolia Jessup
- Xylosma paucinervosa (Steyerm.) Sleumer
- Xylosma peltata (Sleumer) Lescot
- Xylosma pininsularis Guillaumin
- Xylosma planchonellifolia Guillaumin
- Xylosma prockia (Turcz.) Turcz.
- Xylosma proctorii Sleumer
- Xylosma pseudocoriacea (Sleumer) Pillon
- Xylosma pseudosalzmannii Sleumer
- Xylosma pubescens Griseb.
- Xylosma quichensis Donn.Sm.

=== R-Z ===
- Xylosma raimondii Sleumer
- Xylosma reticulata (Schltr.) Pillon
- Xylosma rhombifolia (Britton & P.Wilson) Sleumer
- Xylosma rivularis (Sleumer) Pillon
- Xylosma roigiana Borhidi
- Xylosma rubicunda (H.Karst.) Gilg
- Xylosma ruiziana Sleumer
- Xylosma rusbyana Sleumer
- Xylosma samoensis (Christoph.) Sleumer
- Xylosma sanctae-annae Sleumer
- Xylosma schaefferioides A.Gray
- Xylosma schroederi Sleumer ex Herter
- Xylosma schwaneckeana (Krug & Urb.) Urb.
- Xylosma senticosa Hance
- Xylosma serpentina Sleumer
- Xylosma serrata (Sw.) Urb.
- Xylosma shaferi (P.Wilson) R.A.Howard & W.R.Briggs
- Xylosma simulans A.C.Sm.
- Xylosma smithiana Fosberg
- Xylosma spiculifera (Tul.) Triana & Planch.
- Xylosma suaveolens (J.R.Forst. & G.Forst.) G.Forst.
- Xylosma suluensis Merr.
- Xylosma sumatrana Slooten
- Xylosma terrae-reginae C.T.White & Sleumer
- Xylosma tessmannii Sleumer
- Xylosma trichostemona Guillaumin
- Xylosma tuberculata Sleumer
- Xylosma tweediana (Clos) Eichler
- Xylosma velutina (Tul.) Triana & Planch.
- Xylosma venosa N.E.Br.
- Xylosma vincentii Guillaumin
- Xylosma zollingeriana (Miq.) Sleumer ex R.Kr.Singh & Sanjeet Kumar
- Xylosma zongoi Pillon

=== Formerly placed here ===
- Xylosma flanaganii Bolus = Scolopia flanaganii (Bolus) Sim
- Xylosma latifolia Hook.f. & Thomson = Flacourtia latifolia (Hook.f. & Thomson) T.Cooke
- Xylosma leprosipes Clos = Bennettiodendron leprosipes (Clos) Merr.
- Xylosma monospora Harv. = Xymalos monospora (Harv.) Baill.

== Fossil species ==
In addition to the living species, the following 2 fossil species have been ascribed to Xylosma according to the International Fossil Plant Names Index as of November 2026:

- †Xylosma eoapactis Huzioka & Takahasi
- †Xylosma nepalensis Mah.Prasad & S.M.Pandey
