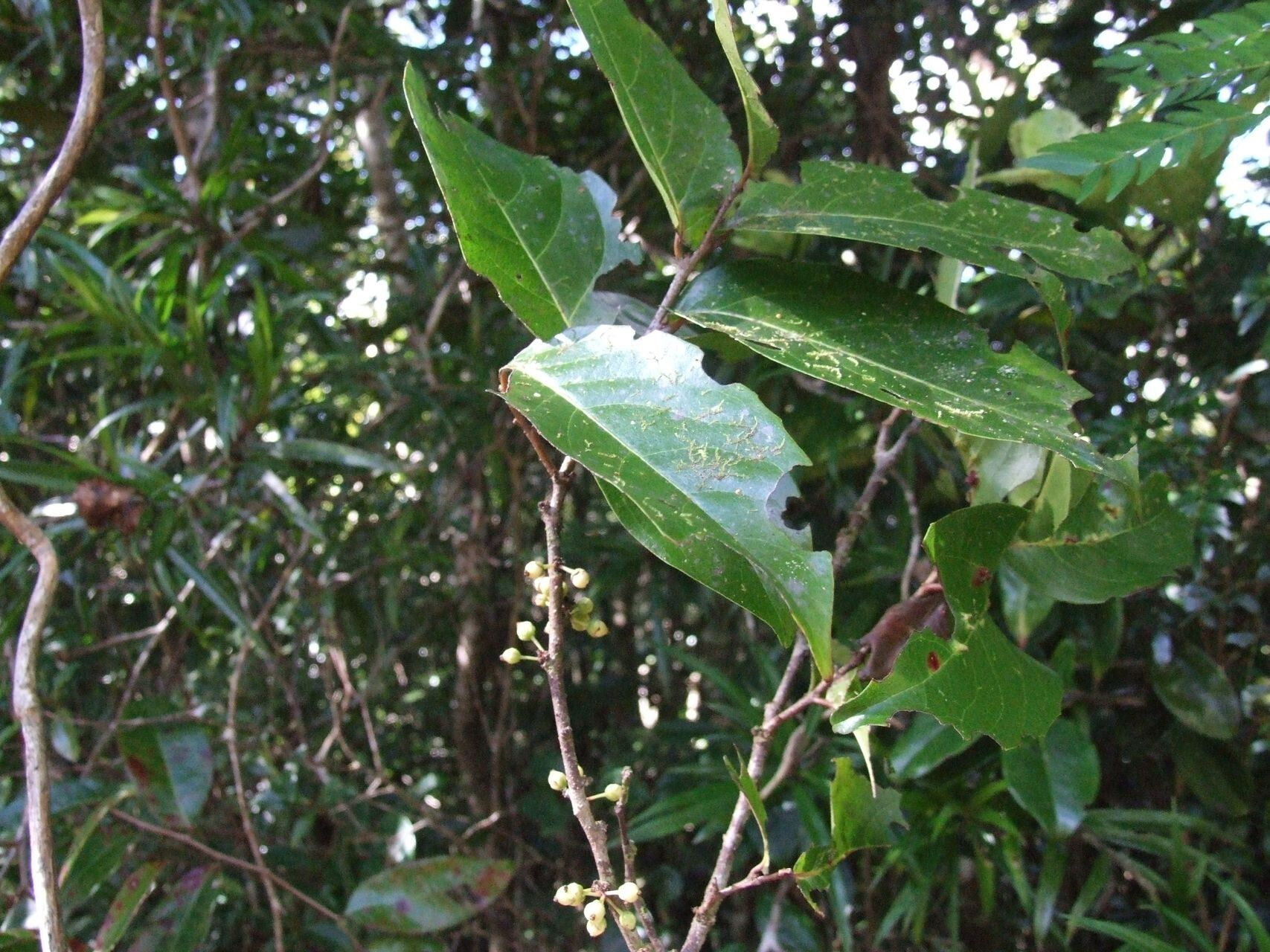
- The leaves and fruits of Xylosma fasciculata.

Scientific classification
- Kingdom: Plantae
- Clade: Tracheophytes
- Clade: Angiosperms
- Clade: Eudicots
- Clade: Rosids
- Order: Malpighiales
- Family: Salicaceae
- Genus: Xylosma
- Species: X. fasciculata

Binomial name
- Xylosma fasciculata Guillaumin

Synonyms
- Lasiochlamys fasciculata (Guillaumin) Sleumer; Xylosma fasciculatum Guillaumin

= Xylosma fasciculata =

Species of flowering plant

Xylosma fasciculata (syn. Lasiochlamys fasciculata) is a species of flowering plant in the family Salicaceae, endemic to New Caledonia. Formerly a member of Lasiochlamys, the name was reinstated in 2023 when the genus was transferred to Xylosma. It is listed as a protected species by the National Natural Heritage Inventory.

== Description ==
Xylosma fasciculata is a shrub or tree reaching up to a reported 8 m (26 ft) tall. Its bark is grey, almost smooth, and the branches are dark brown and rugose. The leaves are ovate, glossy dark green above and light green or slightly yellowish below, measuring up to 12 cm (4.7 in) long and 7 cm (2.8 in) wide, with an attenuate apex, an acute or rounded base, and margins that are entire. The leaf surface is pergamentaceous or subcoriaceous, and the veins come in pairs that form a reticulate pattern; the petiole is short, measuring approximately 5 mm (0.20 in).

The flowers are allegedly greenish-white and grow in fascicles, connected by an articulated pedicel; the flower buds are supposedly greenish-white as well. The tepals are ovate or obtuse, measuring about 8.2 mm (0.32 in) long; the outer tepals are wider and glabrous, while the inner tepals are densely pubescent along with the margins. Female flowers feature reniform stigmas that are sessile. Although the fruits have not been formally described, they reportedly begin white and mature to green or red according to observers.

== Distribution and habitat ==
The range of Xylosma fasciculata is restricted to New Caledonia, extending throughout Grande Terre, occurring across the communes of Canala, Dumbéa, Hienghène, Le Mont-Dore, Ouégoa, Poindimié, Ponérihouen, Pouébo, Poya, Thio, and Touho. Notable localities where it is present include Mont Koghi of the Dumbéa commune; the Diahot River and the forest of Tendé of the Ouégoa and Pouébo communes; and Mont Aoupinié of the Ponérihouen and Poya communes.

Xylosma fasciculata is a tropical species recorded from a range of habitats at elevations of up to 800 m (2,600 ft). Primarily found in montane and submontane environments, it has been seen in flat and sloped forests, and along mountains and rivers.

== Taxonomy ==
Xylosma fasciculata was first described by André Guillaumin in 1953 under the same name it has today; although later changed to Xylosma fasciculatum, it was a redundant correction. In 1974, the taxon was reassigned to Lasiochlamys by Hermann Otto Sleumer, still in Flacourtiaceae. This system was brief however, as Sleumer would hastily refute the accuracy of the family in 1975. As a result, Lasiochlamys fasciculata, along with its genus, were changed to be in Salicaceae.

An ecological study in 1980 by Tanguy Jaffré noted that Lasiochlamys could be differentiated from Xylosma for lacking the property of accumulating nickel, but this would later prove ineffective as a distinguishing trait. In 2005, Mac Haverson Alford published a thesis in which Lasiochlamys was suggested to be nested in Xylosma based on molecular phylogenetic analysis. It was not until 2023 however, when Lasiochlamys was ultimately synonymized with Xylosma by Yohan Pillon, resulting in the transfer of all of its species to the new classification. This revision resulted in the renaming of Lasiochlamys fasciculata to its now recognized name; Xylosma fasciculata, which cites Guillaumin as the author once more. Decades earlier, Xylosma underwent a gender agreement whose purpose was to match the specific epithets with the female generic name; it was likely initiated by William T. Stearn in 1992 when he commented on the gender inaccuracy, and finalized by Dan Henry Nicolson in 1994. Despite this, Xylosma fasciculata was technically not subject to it because it was in Lasiochlamys at the time, and that inadvertently corrected the name; this is due to the genus having a female name.

=== Etymology ===
The generic name Xylosma derives from xylon (Ancient Greek: ξύλον), meaning "wood" or "tree", and osmé (Ancient Greek: ὀσμή), meaning "smell", overall referring to the aromatic wood found in some species. The specific epithet, fasciculata, denotes its fasciculate flowers, as it means "bundled" or "clustered". As for the defunct genus Lasiochlamys, it stems from lasio- (Ancient Greek: λάσιος), meaning "hairy", and chlamys (Ancient Greek: χλαμύς), meaning "cloak".

== Conservation status ==
Xylosma fasciculata is listed as a protected species by the National Natural Heritage Inventory under its previous name, though further information on its status is absent.
