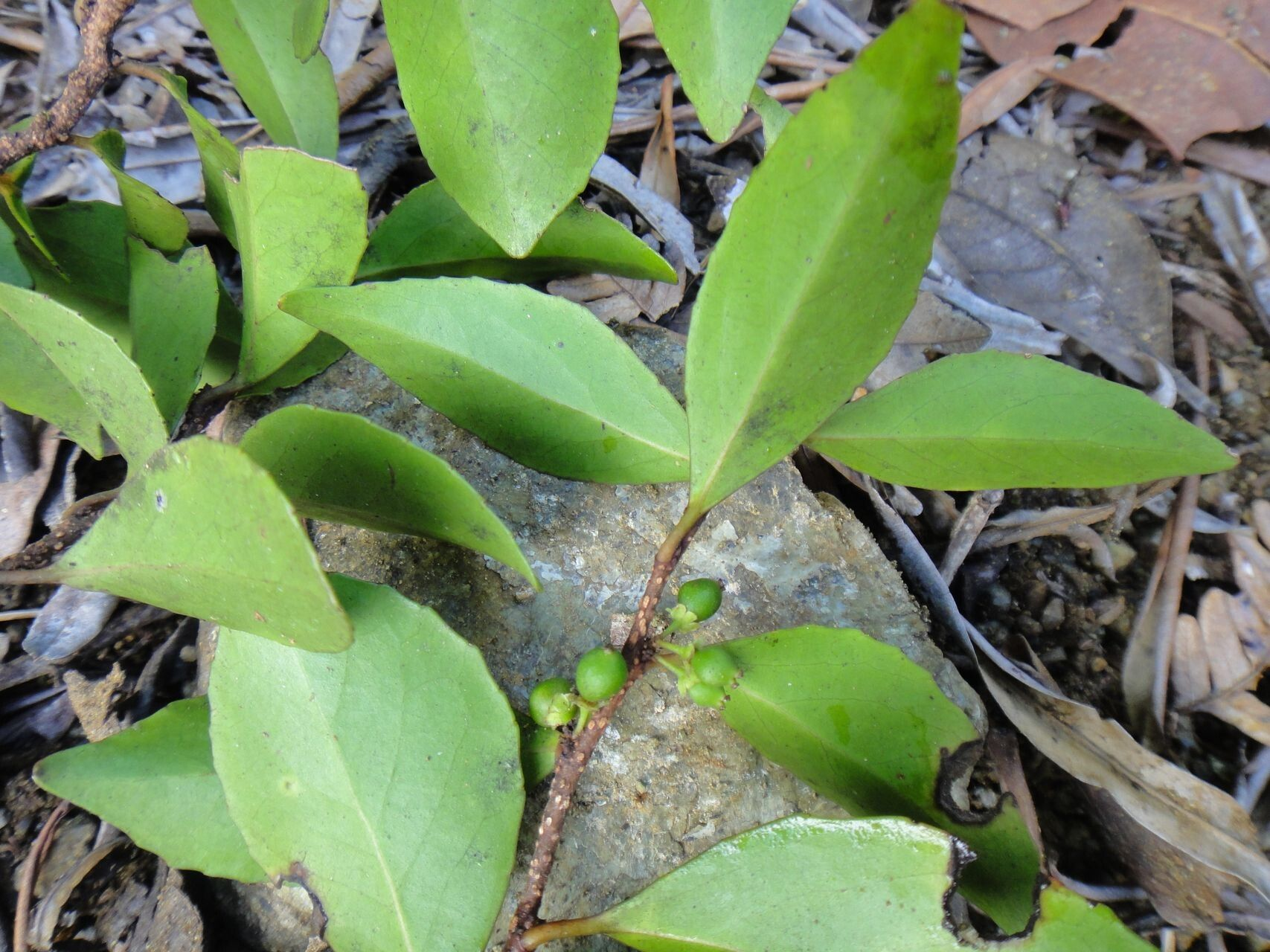
- The leaves and fruits of Xylosma koghiensis.

Scientific classification
- Kingdom: Plantae
- Clade: Tracheophytes
- Clade: Angiosperms
- Clade: Eudicots
- Clade: Rosids
- Order: Malpighiales
- Family: Salicaceae
- Genus: Xylosma
- Species: X. koghiensis

Binomial name
- Xylosma koghiensis Guillaumin

Synonyms
- Lasiochlamys koghiensis (Guillaumin) Sleumer; Xylosma koghiense Guillaumin

= Xylosma koghiensis =

Species of flowering plant

Xylosma koghiensis (syn. Lasiochlamys koghiensis) is a species of flowering plant in the family Salicaceae, endemic to New Caledonia. Formerly a member of Lasiochlamys, the name was reinstated in 2023 when the genus was transferred to Xylosma. It is listed as a protected species by the National Natural Heritage Inventory.

== Description ==
Xylosma koghiensis is a shrub or tree reaching up to a reported 5 m (16 ft) in height, allegedly varying in shape and height across different environments. Documented with an arching, globose, or even slender crown, it is a ramified plant with dark brown branches marked by prominent lenticels. Its variable leaves are glabrous and leathery, ovate-rhomboid, and typically measure 2.5–3.5 cm (0.98–1.38 in) in length and 1–2 cm (0.39–0.79 in) in width. The leaf apices taper to a point, while the bases are cuneate, and the margins are gently undulate and dentate. Each leaf has 3–5 pairs of slender veins that are not easily seen, and the petioles are thin, usually 3–5 mm (0.12–0.20 in) long. The foliage may appear dark green above and lighter below, sometimes with a shiny surface on both sides.

The flowers grow in small fascicles, and sit on a short reddish pedicel about 3 mm (0.12 in) long, which is jointed at the base and is papillose. The flowers are allegedly yellowish and flower buds are supposedly red-yellow. The outer perianth is reportedly reddish and glabrous, and the inner perianth is supposedly white and pubescent, overall composed of 4–8 minutely ovate and entire tepals measuring 1.5 mm (0.059 in) long. The globose ovary is attached to a subulate style, and is tipped by two reniform stigmas forming a small crown-like structure. Although the fruits have not been formally described, green fruits are commonly documented.

== Distribution and habitat ==
The range of Xylosma koghiensis is restricted to New Caledonia, extending across southeastern Grande Terre, occurring across the communes of Boulouparis, Dumbéa, Le Mont-Dore, Païta, Thio, and Yaté. Notable localities where it is present include Mont Do of the Boulouparis commune; Mont Koghi of the Dumbéa commune; Montagne des Sources of the Le Mont-Dore commune; Mont Dzumac of the Païta commune; and Mont Sindoa of the Thio commune. Outside of its native range, it has been preserved from Vietnam at Núi Chứa Chan, a mountain in Đồng Nai province.

Xylosma koghiensis is a tropical species reported from a range of habitats at elevations of up to 1,250 m (4,100 ft). It is most commonly found in humid forests and forested slopes, often along roadsides and trails. The species favors ultramafic and serpentine substrates and is frequently associated with summit ridges, massifs, and degraded scrubland. It also occurs near creeks and in montane vegetation, including areas dominated by Araucaria.

== Taxonomy ==
Xylosma koghiensis was first described by André Guillaumin in 1953 under the same name it has today; although later changed to Xylosma koghiense, it was a redundant correction. In 1974, the taxon was reassigned to Lasiochlamys by Hermann Otto Sleumer, still in Flacourtiaceae. This system was brief however, as Sleumer would hastily refute the accuracy of the family in 1975. As a result, Lasiochlamys koghiensis, along with its genus, were changed to be in Salicaceae.

An ecological study in 1980 by Tanguy Jaffré noted that Lasiochlamys could be differentiated from Xylosma for lacking the property of accumulating nickel, but this would later prove ineffective as a distinguishing trait. In 2005, Mac Haverson Alford published a thesis in which Lasiochlamys was suggested to be nested in Xylosma based on molecular phylogenetic analysis. It was not until 2023 however, when Lasiochlamys was ultimately synonymized with Xylosma by Yohan Pillon, resulting in the transfer of all of its species to the new classification. This revision resulted in the renaming of Lasiochlamys koghiensis to its now recognized name; Xylosma koghiensis, which cites Guillaumin as the author once more. Decades earlier, Xylosma underwent a gender agreement whose purpose was to match the specific epithets with the female generic name; it was likely initiated by William T. Stearn in 1992 when he commented on the gender inaccuracy, and finalized by Dan Henry Nicolson in 1994. Despite this, Xylosma fasciculata was technically not subject to it because it was in Lasiochlamys at the time, and that inadvertently corrected the name; this is due to the genus having a female name.

=== Etymology ===
The generic name Xylosma derives from xylon (Ancient Greek: ξύλον), meaning "wood" or "tree", and osmé (Ancient Greek: ὀσμή), meaning "smell", overall referring to the aromatic wood found in some species. The specific epithet, koghiensis, is in reference to Mont Koghi, which is where the type specimen was obtained. As for the defunct genus Lasiochlamys, it stems from lasio- (Ancient Greek: λάσιος), meaning "hairy", and chlamys (Ancient Greek: χλαμύς), meaning "cloak".

== Conservation status ==
Xylosma koghiensis is listed as a protected species by the National Natural Heritage Inventory under its previous name, though further information on its status is absent.
