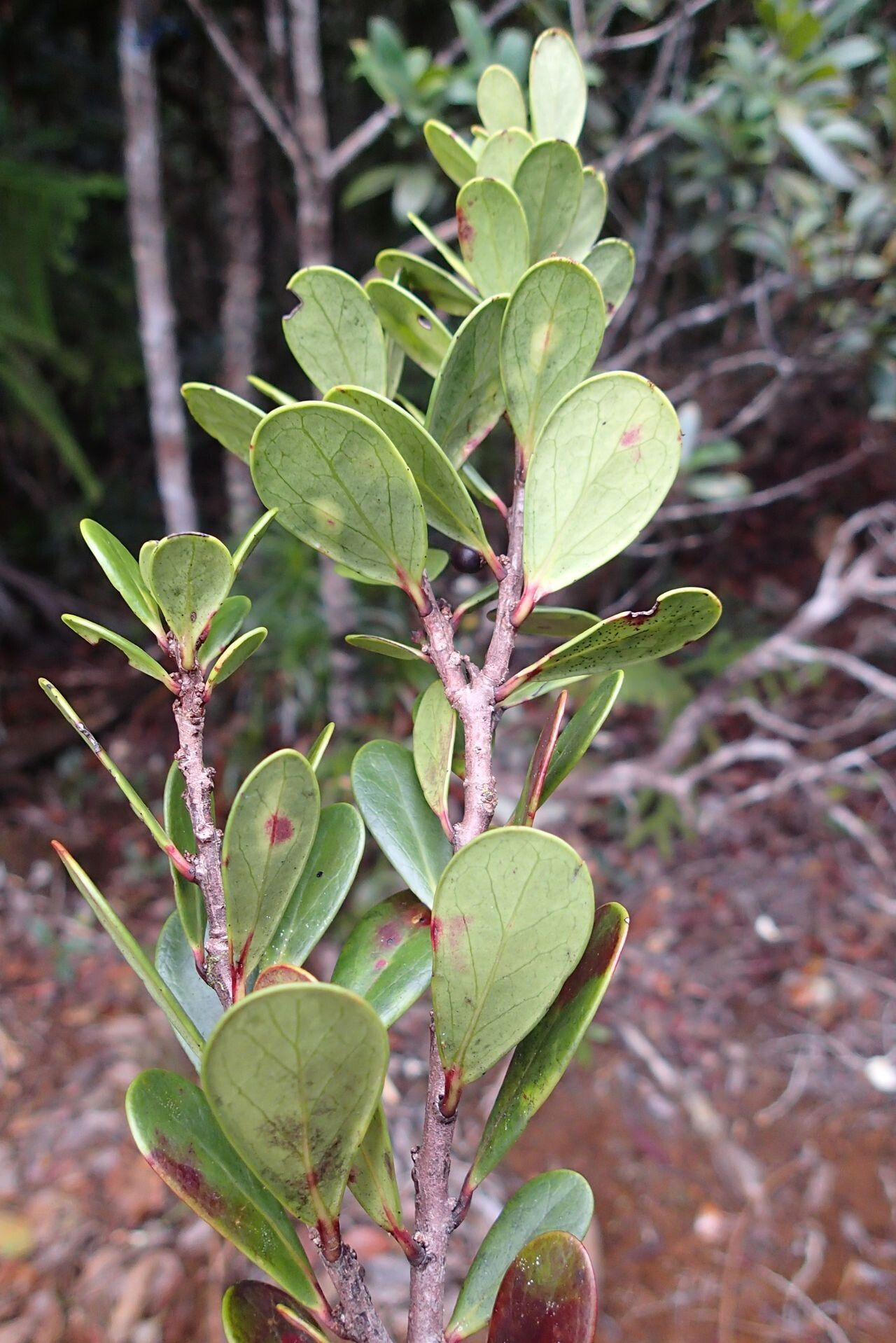
- The leaves of Xylosma planchonellifolia.

Scientific classification
- Kingdom: Plantae
- Clade: Tracheophytes
- Clade: Angiosperms
- Clade: Eudicots
- Clade: Rosids
- Order: Malpighiales
- Family: Salicaceae
- Genus: Xylosma
- Species: X. planchonellifolia

Binomial name
- Xylosma planchonellifolia Guillaumin

Synonyms
- Lasiochlamys planchonellaefolia (Guillaumin) Sleumer; Lasiochlamys planchonellifolia (Guillaumin) Sleumer; Xylosma planchonellaefolia Guillaumin; Xylosma planchonellaefolium Guillaumin

= Xylosma planchonellifolia =

Species of flowering plant

Xylosma planchonellifolia (syn. Lasiochlamys planchonellifolia) is a species of flowering plant in the family Salicaceae, endemic to New Caledonia. Formerly a member of Lasiochlamys, the name was reinstated in 2023 when the genus was transferred to Xylosma. It is listed as a protected species by the National Natural Heritage Inventory.

== Description ==
Xylosma planchonellifolia is a shrub or tree reaching up to a reported 10 m (33 ft) in height, characterized by a slender habit and contorted branches, along with dense wood. The leaves measure up to 7 cm (2.8 in) long and 3 cm (1.2 in) wide, are glabrous, glossy dark green above, light yellowish green below, and often tinged with red; the shape is spatulate, the apex is rounded, the base is attenuate, and the margins are entire. The leaf surface is coriaceous, and the veins come in pairs that form a reticulate pattern; the petiole is allegedly red, measuring roughly 1 cm (0.39 in).

The flowers are reportedly green-white, yellow, or reddish and grow in fascicles, connected by a small articulated pedicel. The tepals are ovate or lanceolate, measuring about 1.5 mm (0.059 in) long; the outer tepals are glabrous, while the inner tepals are slightly pubescent, both displaying ciliolate margins. Male flowers have stamens that feature elongate filaments and globose anthers; the connective is prominently thickened and globose. Female flowers exhibit a green pistil. Although the fruits have not been formally described, they are reportedly green or yellowish and small in size.

== Distribution and habitat ==
The range of Xylosma planchonellifolia is restricted to New Caledonia, extending across central and southeastern Grande Terre, occurring across the communes of Canala, Boulouparis, Bourail, Dumbéa, Kouaoua, Le Mont-Dore, Païta, Thio, Yaté. Notable localities where it is present include Mont Do and the Tontouta River of the Boulouparis commune; Montagne des Sources of the Le Mont-Dore commune; Mont Dzumac of the Païta commune; and Mont Humboldt and the Rivière Bleue of the Yaté commune.

Xylosma planchonellifolia is a locally common tropical species reported from a range of habitats at elevations of up to 1,050 m (3,440 ft). Primarily found in montane and submontane environments, it occurs along ridges, at summits, valleys, forested slopes, around rivers, and even adjacent to human infrastructure. It is additionally found growing on peridotite and serpentine substrates, often within forests of Araucaria and Nothofagus.

== Taxonomy ==
Xylosma planchonellifolia was first described by André Guillaumin in 1953 under the name Xylosma planchonellaefolia, which is only slightly different from its current one; although later changed to Xylosma planchonellaefolium, it was a redundant correction. In 1974, the taxon was reassigned to Lasiochlamys by Hermann Otto Sleumer, still in Flacourtiaceae; the epithet was later corrected to planchonellifolia. This system was brief however, as Sleumer would hastily refute the accuracy of the family in 1975. As a result, Lasiochlamys planchonellifolia, along with its genus, were changed to be in Salicaceae.

An ecological study in 1980 by Tanguy Jaffré noted that Lasiochlamys could be differentiated from Xylosma for lacking the property of accumulating nickel, but this would later prove ineffective as a distinguishing trait. In 2005, Mac Haverson Alford published a thesis in which Lasiochlamys was suggested to be nested in Xylosma based on molecular phylogenetic analysis. It was not until 2023 however, when Lasiochlamys was ultimately synonymized with Xylosma by Yohan Pillon, resulting in the transfer of all of its species to the new classification. This revision resulted in the renaming of Lasiochlamys planchonellifolia to its now recognized name; Xylosma planchonellifolia, which cites Guillaumin as the author once more. Decades earlier, Xylosma underwent a gender agreement whose purpose was to match the specific epithets with the female generic name; it was likely initiated by William T. Stearn in 1992 when he commented on the gender inaccuracy, and finalized by Dan Henry Nicolson in 1994. Despite this, Xylosma planchonellifolia was technically not subject to it because it was in Lasiochlamys at the time, and that inadvertently corrected the name; this is due to the genus having a female name.

=== Etymology ===
The generic name Xylosma derives from xylon (Ancient Greek: ξύλον), meaning "wood" or "tree", and osmé (Ancient Greek: ὀσμή), meaning "smell", overall referring to the aromatic wood found in some species. The specific epithet, planchonellifolia, denotes its leaves, as it stems from the genus Planchonella, and folia, meaning "leaf", overall referring to "having leaves like Planchonella". As for the defunct genus Lasiochlamys, it stems from lasio- (Ancient Greek: λάσιος), meaning "hairy", and chlamys (Ancient Greek: χλαμύς), meaning "cloak".

== Conservation status ==
Xylosma planchonellifolia is listed as a protected species by the National Natural Heritage Inventory under its previous name, though further information on its status is absent.
