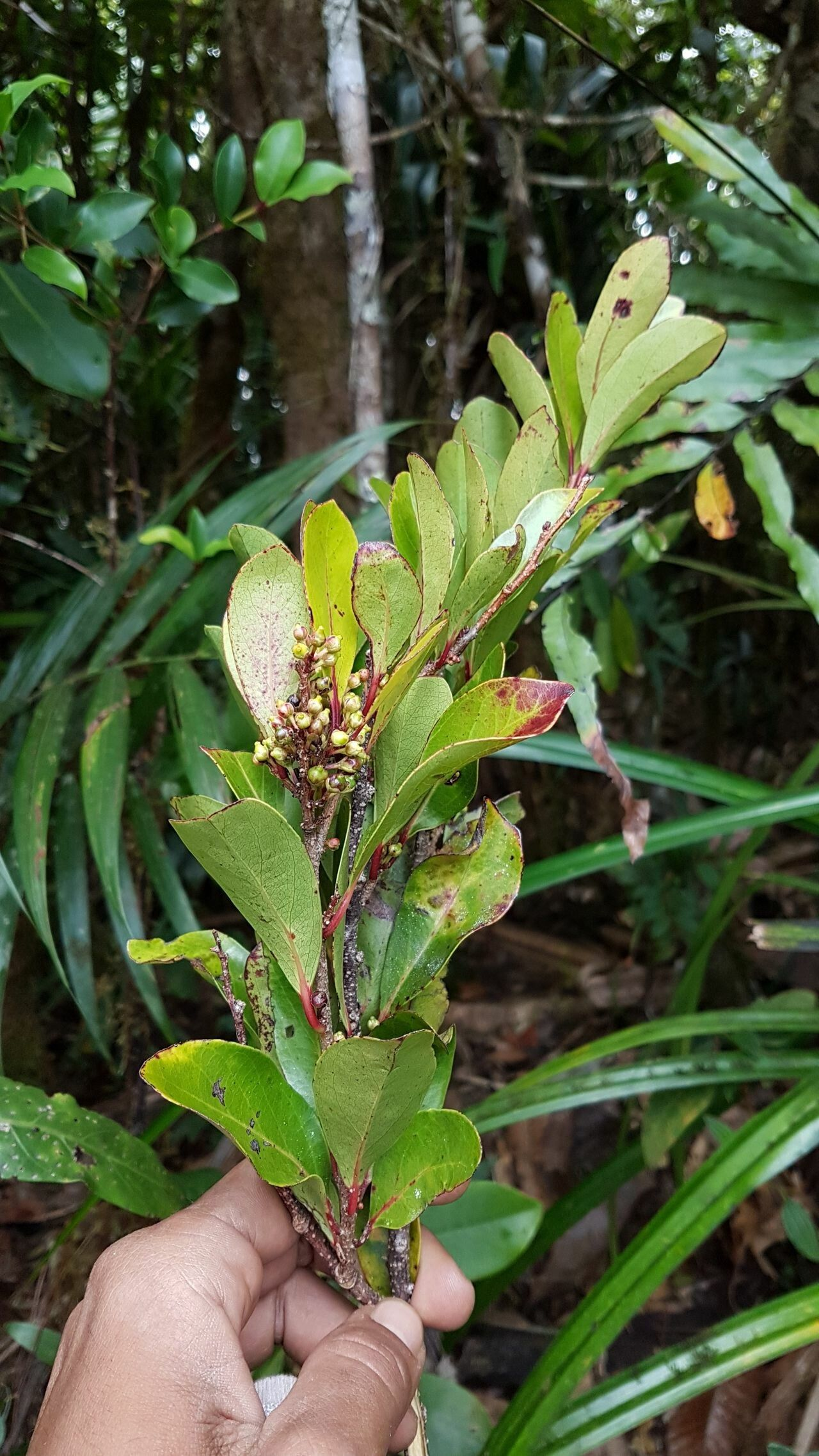
- The leaves and fruits of Xylosma mandjeliana.

Conservation status
- Vulnerable (IUCN 2.3)

Scientific classification
- Kingdom: Plantae
- Clade: Tracheophytes
- Clade: Angiosperms
- Clade: Eudicots
- Clade: Rosids
- Order: Malpighiales
- Family: Salicaceae
- Genus: Xylosma
- Species: X. mandjeliana

Binomial name
- Xylosma mandjeliana (Sleumer) Pillon

Synonyms
- Lasiochlamys mandjeliana Sleumer

= Xylosma mandjeliana =

Species of flowering plant

Xylosma mandjeliana (syn. Lasiochlamys mandjeliana) is a species of flowering plant in the family Salicaceae, endemic to New Caledonia. Formerly a member of Lasiochlamys, the new name was given in 2023 when the genus was transferred to Xylosma. It is listed as a protected species by the National Natural Heritage Inventory and was classified as vulnerable by the IUCN Red List in 1998.

== Description ==
Xylosma mandjeliana is a ramified shrub or tree reaching up to a reported 4 m (13 ft) in height, characterized by a bushy or slender habit with branches that are glabrous at the tips, featuring thin reddish-brown bark that is both densely pustulate and lenticellate. The leaves measure up to 6 cm (2.4 in) long and 2 cm (0.79 in) wide, are glabrous, slightly revolute, glossy dark green above, light green below, and often tinged with red; the shape is oblong or obovate, the apex is rounded or emarginate, the base is cuneate, and the margins are entire. The leaf surface is subcoriaceous, and the veins come in pairs that form a reticulate pattern; the petiole is short, measuring up to 6 mm (0.24 in) long.

The flowers are reportedly whitish, yellow, greenish-white, or reddish, growing in fascicles or short axillary racemes, typically connected by an articulated pedicel. The tepals are oblong or obovate, measuring 2.5 mm (0.098 in) long; the outer tepals are subglabrous outwards and pubescent inwards, while the inner tepals are similar but smaller in size; both sets display ciliolate margins. Female flowers bear an ovoid ovary featuring an attenuate apex that is tipped by subsessile stigmas. The fruit is subglobose, usually green, and measures roughly 5 mm (0.20 in) in diameter.

== Distribution and habitat ==
The range of Xylosma mandjeliana is restricted to New Caledonia, and is only documented from a limited extent in northern Grande Terre, occupying the communes of Ouégoa and Pouébo. Notable localities where it is present include the Diahot River, the forest of Tendé, and Mont Mandjélia of both the Ouégoa and Pouébo communes; and Mont Colnett of the southern Pouébo commune.

Xylosma mandjeliana is a tropical species reported from a narrow range of habitats at elevations of up to 1,000 m (3,300 ft). Being found in montane and riparian environments, it occurs in flat or sloped forests and along ridges. Additionally, it is noted to be in humid forest on mica schists.

== Taxonomy ==
Xylosma mandjeliana was first described in 1974 by Hermann Otto Sleumer under the name Lasiochlamys mandjeliana, in the family Flacourtiaceae. This system was brief however, as Sleumer would hastily refute the accuracy of the family in 1975. As a result, Lasiochlamys mandjeliana, along with its genus, were changed to be in Salicaceae.

An ecological study in 1980 by Tanguy Jaffré noted that Lasiochlamys could be differentiated from Xylosma for lacking the property of accumulating nickel, but this would later prove ineffective as a distinguishing trait. In 2005, Mac Haverson Alford published a thesis in which Lasiochlamys was suggested to be nested in Xylosma based on molecular phylogenetic analysis. It was not until 2023 however, when Lasiochlamys was ultimately synonymized with Xylosma by Yohan Pillon, resulting in the transfer of all of its species to the new classification. This revision resulted in the renaming of Lasiochlamys mandjeliana to its now recognized name; Xylosma mandjeliana. Decades earlier, Xylosma underwent a gender agreement whose purpose was to match the specific epithets with the female generic name; it was likely initiated by William T. Stearn in 1992 when he commented on the gender inaccuracy, and finalized by Dan Henry Nicolson in 1994. Despite this, Xylosma mandjeliana was not subject to it because the taxon was published after the agreement took place.

=== Etymology ===
The generic name Xylosma derives from xylon (Ancient Greek: ξύλον), meaning "wood" or "tree", and osmé (Ancient Greek: ὀσμή), meaning "smell", overall referring to the aromatic wood found in some species. The specific epithet, mandjeliana, is in reference to Mont Mandjélia, which is where the type specimen was obtained. As for the defunct genus Lasiochlamys, it stems from lasio- (Ancient Greek: λάσιος), meaning "hairy," and chlamys (Ancient Greek: χλαμύς), meaning "cloak".

== Conservation status ==
Xylosma mandjeliana was classified as vulnerable by the IUCN Red List under its old name in 1998; the assessment itself has many missing elements and needs updating due to its age. It is listed as a protected species by the National Natural Heritage Inventory also under its previous name, though further information on its status is absent.
