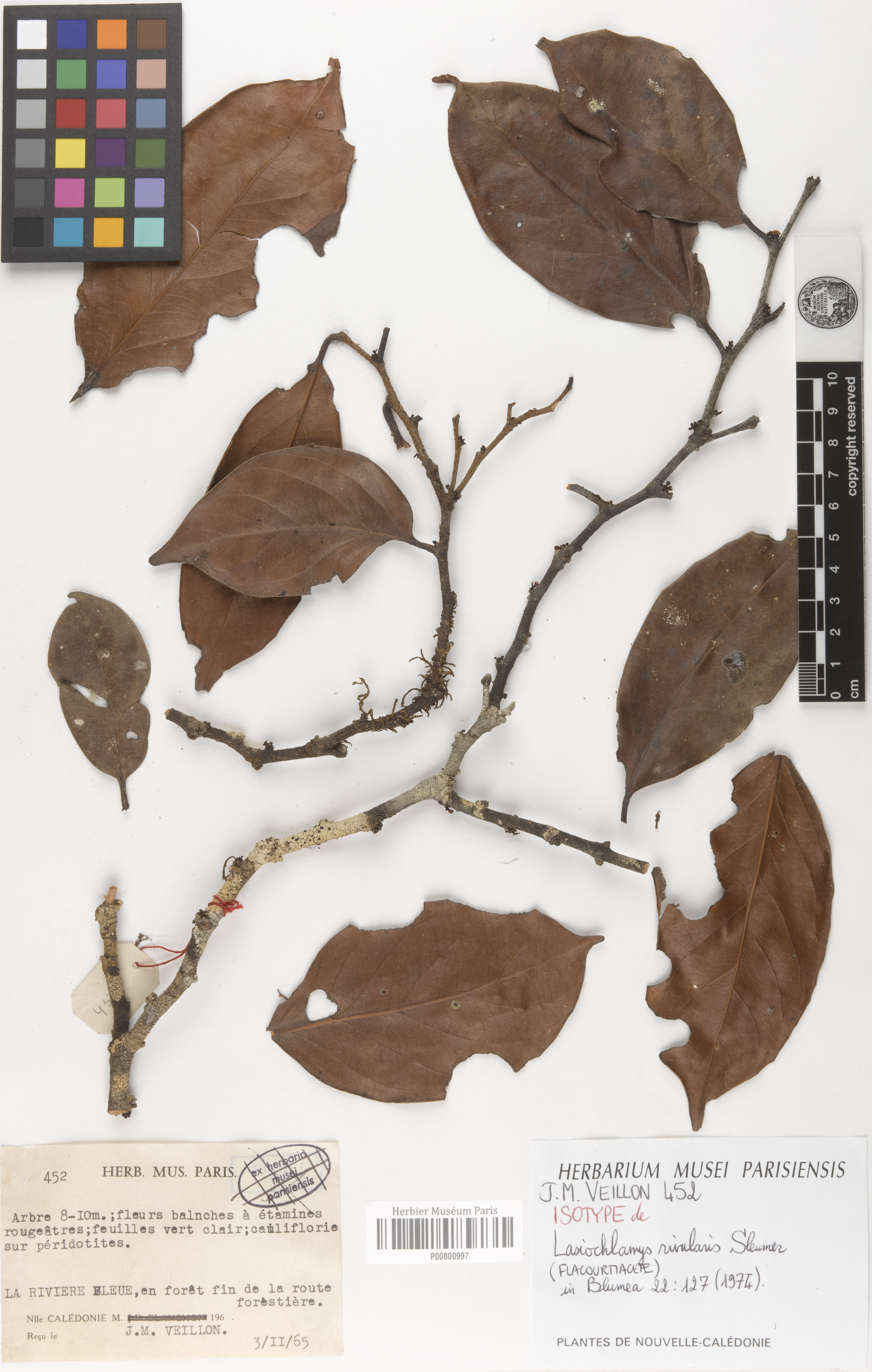
- A herbarium specimen of Xylosma rivularis with aged leaves and floral remnants.

Scientific classification
- Kingdom: Plantae
- Clade: Tracheophytes
- Clade: Angiosperms
- Clade: Eudicots
- Clade: Rosids
- Order: Malpighiales
- Family: Salicaceae
- Genus: Xylosma
- Species: X. rivularis

Binomial name
- Xylosma rivularis (Sleumer) Pillon

Synonyms
- Casearia lifuana sensu Guillaumin; Lasiochlamys rivularis Sleumer

= Xylosma rivularis =

Species of flowering plant

Xylosma rivularis (syn. Lasiochlamys rivularis) is a species of flowering plant in the family Salicaceae, endemic to New Caledonia. Formerly a member of Lasiochlamys, the new name was given in 2023 when the genus was transferred to Xylosma. It is listed as a protected species by the National Natural Heritage Inventory.

== Description ==
Xylosma rivularis is a shrub or tree reportedly reaching up to 5 m (16 ft) in height, allegedly varying depending on the conditions. It produces slender flowering branches 4–8 mm (0.16–0.31 in) wide; the stems are smooth, quickly becoming woody, and show faint, round lenticels at the base, and they appear glabrous overall. The leaves are oblong to elliptic, measuring 9–13 cm (3.5–5.1 in) long and 4–6.5 cm (1.6–2.6 in) wide, with tips that are either slightly acute or obtuse, and a cuneate base. Leaf surfaces are firm, leathery, and glossy, turning reddish-brown when dried. Field observations describe the leaves as glossy dark green on the upper surface and either light green or dark green below. Margins are entire but feature minute glands. The vein network is lush and dense below, forming a reticulate pattern, while veins above are less visible and slightly raised. Petioles are 9–12 mm (0.35–0.47 in) long and 2–3 mm (0.079–0.118 in) thick.

Flowers appear in the axils of fallen leaves and are arranged in compact fascicles. The inflorescences are made up of multiple small flowers and are reportedly found on older woody branches. Each flower sits on a short, thick pedicel just 1–1.5 mm (0.039–0.059 in) long, and all are glabrous. The outer tepals, which number up to four, are ovate to nearly round, glabrous on the outside, lightly pubescent inside, and edged with fine white hairs. The inner tepals are similar but slightly smaller and thinner. The flowers are described as white or greenish-white in male specimens, occasionally appearing greenish-yellow or extremely small. Male flowers contain approximately 20–25 stamens; their filaments bear fine hairs. Female flowers have a nearly globose, glabrous ovary topped by two reniform stigmas without stalks.

== Distribution and habitat ==
The range of Xylosma rivularis is restricted to New Caledonia, extending across west-central and southeastern Grande Terre, occurring across the communes of Le Mont-Dore, Pouembout, and Yaté. Notable localities where it is present include Montagne des Sources and the Rivière Bleue within the Le Mont-Dore and Yaté communes; and the forests of the Pouembout commune.

Xylosma rivularis is a tropical species reported from a range of habitats at elevations of up to 500 m (1,600 ft). Such habitats include flat and valley forest, and dense humid vegetation with undercover growth, additionally occurring on substrates of peridotite and alluvium.

== Taxonomy ==
Xylosma rivularis was first described in 1964 by André Guillaumin inadvertently as a specimen of Casearia lifuana, a currently accepted plant species; which was within the now defunct Samydaceae at the time. In 1974, the plant was formally described by Hermann Otto Sleumer as Lasiochlamys rivularis, now placed in Flacourtiaceae. This system was brief however, as Sleumer would hastily refute the accuracy of the family in 1975. As a result, Lasiochlamys rivularis, along with its genus, were changed to be in Salicaceae.

An ecological study in 1980 by Tanguy Jaffré noted that Lasiochlamys could be differentiated from Xylosma for lacking the property of accumulating nickel, but this would later prove ineffective as a distinguishing trait. In 2005, Mac Haverson Alford published a thesis in which Lasiochlamys was suggested to be nested in Xylosma based on molecular phylogenetic analysis. It was not until 2023 however, when Lasiochlamys was ultimately synonymized with Xylosma by Yohan Pillon, resulting in the transfer of all of its species to the new classification. This revision resulted in the renaming of Lasiochlamys rivularis to its now recognized name; Xylosma rivularis. Decades earlier, Xylosma underwent a gender agreement whose purpose was to match the specific epithets with the female generic name; it was likely initiated by William T. Stearn in 1992 when he commented on the gender inaccuracy, and finalized by Dan Henry Nicolson in 1994. Despite this, Xylosma rivularis was not subject to it because the taxon was published after the agreement took place.

=== Etymology ===
The generic name Xylosma derives from xylon (Ancient Greek: ξύλον), meaning "wood" or "tree", and osmé (Ancient Greek: ὀσμή), meaning "smell", overall referring to the aromatic wood found in some species. The specific epithet, rivularis, denotes its habitat, as it means "of a brook" or "pertaining to a stream". As for the defunct genus Lasiochlamys, it stems from lasio- (Ancient Greek: λάσιος), meaning "hairy", and chlamys (Ancient Greek: χλαμύς), meaning "cloak".

== Conservation status ==
Xylosma rivularis is listed as a protected species by the National Natural Heritage Inventory under its previous name, though further information on its status is absent.
