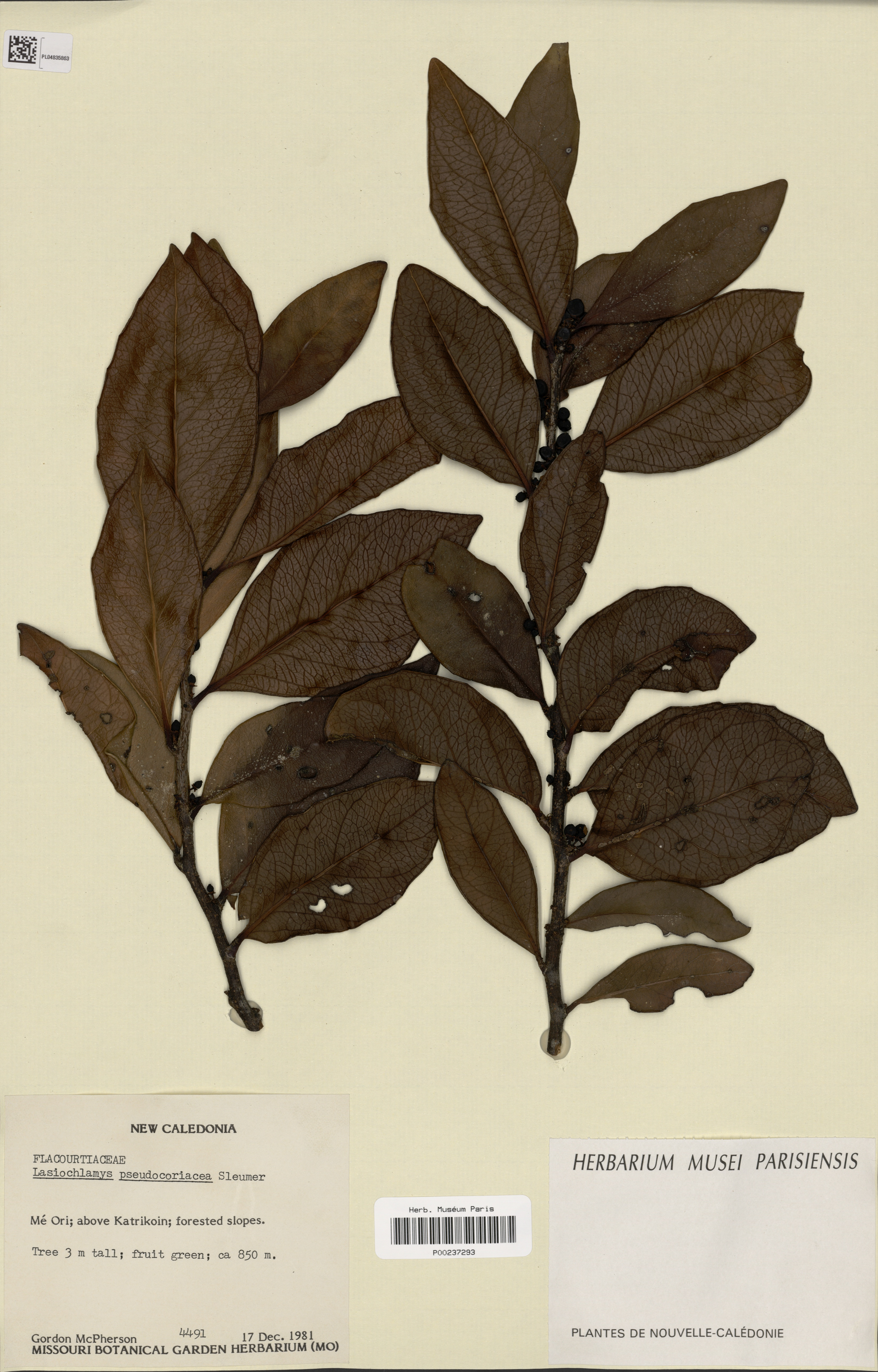
- A herbarium specimen of Xylosma pseudocoriacea with aged leaves and fruits.

Conservation status
- Vulnerable (IUCN 2.3)

Scientific classification
- Kingdom: Plantae
- Clade: Tracheophytes
- Clade: Angiosperms
- Clade: Eudicots
- Clade: Rosids
- Order: Malpighiales
- Family: Salicaceae
- Genus: Xylosma
- Species: X. pseudocoriacea

Binomial name
- Xylosma pseudocoriacea (Sleumer) Pillon

Synonyms
- Lasiochlamys pseudocoriacea Sleumer

= Xylosma pseudocoriacea =

Species of flowering plant

Xylosma pseudocoriacea (syn. Lasiochlamys pseudocoriacea) is a species of flowering plant in the family Salicaceae, endemic to New Caledonia. Formerly a member of Lasiochlamys, the new name was given in 2023 when the genus was transferred to Xylosma. It is listed as a protected species by the National Natural Heritage Inventory and was classified as vulnerable by the IUCN Red List in 1998.

== Description ==
Xylosma pseudocoriacea is an erect shrub or tree reaching up to a reported 3 m (9.8 ft) in height, characterized by a slender habit with branches that are glabrous at the tips, featuring blackish-grey bark that is loosely lenticellate. The leaves measure up to 13 cm (5.1 in) long and 6 cm (2.4 in) wide, are glabrous, slightly revolute, glossy dark green above, light green or reddish below, and olive-brown when dried; the shape is oblong or elliptic, the apex is attenuate or subacuminate; the base cuneate or obtuse; and the margins are crenate or entire. The leaf surface is coriaceous, and the veins come in pairs that form a reticulate pattern; the petiole is glabrous, measuring roughly 1 cm (0.39 in) long.

The flowers are reportedly whitish or yellow, growing in fascicles, connected by an articulated pedicel. The tepals are ovate, measuring 2 mm (0.079 in) long; the outer tepals are glabrous outwards and arachnoid inwards, while the inner tepals are similar but smaller, both sets displaying ciliate margins and a ciliolate apex. Male flowers have up to 30 stamens with pubescent filaments. Female flowers feature a glabrous, subglobose ovary crowned by subsessile stigmas; the fruits are reportedly green but black when dried.

== Distribution and habitat ==
The range of Xylosma pseudocoriacea is restricted to New Caledonia, and is only documented from a limited extent in central Grande Terre, occupying the communes of Kouaoua and Moindou. It is exclusively recorded from Mé Ori and the areas surrounding the mountain.

Xylosma pseudocoriacea is a tropical species reported from a narrow range of habitats at elevations of up to 1,000 m (3,300 ft). Being found in montane and submontane environments, it occurs on forested slopes and at summits. Additionally, it is noted to be in wet forest on serpentine substrates.

== Taxonomy ==
Xylosma pseudocoriacea was first described in 1974 by Hermann Otto Sleumer under the name Lasiochlamys pseudocoriacea, in the family Flacourtiaceae. This system was brief however, as Sleumer would hastily refute the accuracy of the family in 1975. As a result, Lasiochlamys pseudocoriacea, along with its genus, were changed to be in Salicaceae.

An ecological study in 1980 by Tanguy Jaffré noted that Lasiochlamys could be differentiated from Xylosma for lacking the property of accumulating nickel, but this would later prove ineffective as a distinguishing trait. In 2005, Mac Haverson Alford published a thesis in which Lasiochlamys was suggested to be nested in Xylosma based on molecular phylogenetic analysis. It was not until 2023 however, when Lasiochlamys was ultimately synonymized with Xylosma by Yohan Pillon, resulting in the transfer of all of its species to the new classification. This revision resulted in the renaming of Lasiochlamys pseudocoriacea to its now recognized name; Xylosma pseudocoriacea. Decades earlier, Xylosma underwent a gender agreement whose purpose was to match the specific epithets with the female generic name; it was likely initiated by William T. Stearn in 1992 when he commented on the gender inaccuracy, and finalized by Dan Henry Nicolson in 1994. Despite this, Xylosma pseudocoriacea was not subject to it because the taxon was published after the agreement took place.

=== Etymology ===
The generic name Xylosma derives from xylon (Ancient Greek: ξύλον), meaning "wood" or "tree", and osmé (Ancient Greek: ὀσμή), meaning "smell", overall referring to the aromatic wood found in some species. The specific epithet, pseudocoriacea, denotes its appearance, as the name stems from pseudo- (Ancient Greek: ψεῦδος), meaning "resembling" in this context, and coriaceus, meaning "leathery"; this collectively addresses a superficial resemblance to Xylosma zongoi, formerly known by Lasiochlamys coriacea. As for the defunct genus Lasiochlamys, it stems from lasio- (Ancient Greek: λάσιος), meaning "hairy," and chlamys (Ancient Greek: χλαμύς), meaning "cloak".

== Conservation status ==
Xylosma pseudocoriacea was classified as vulnerable by the IUCN Red List under its old name in 1998; the assessment itself has many missing elements and needs updating due to its age. It is listed as a protected species by the National Natural Heritage Inventory also under its previous name, though further information on its status is absent.
