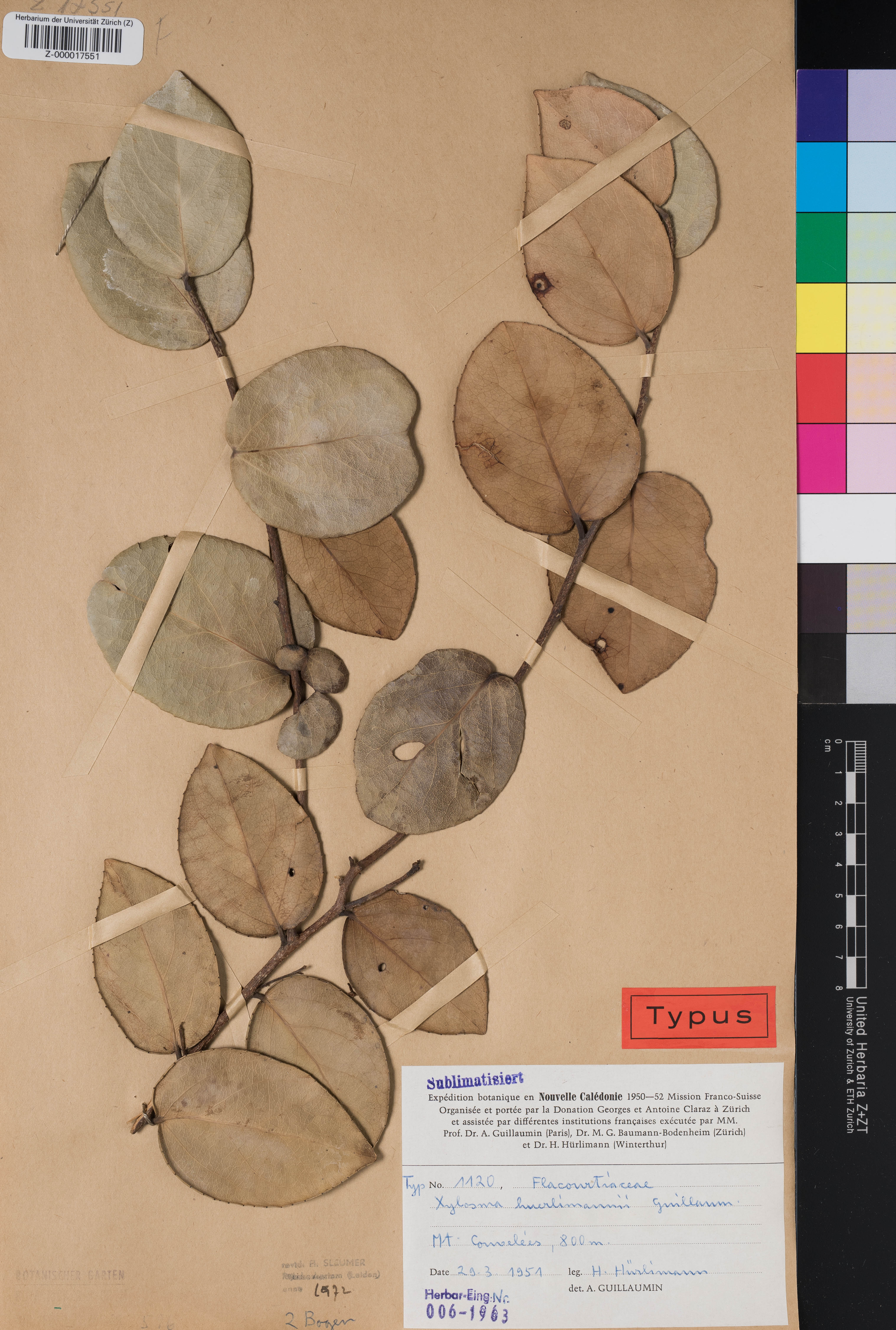
- A herbarium specimen of Xylosma hurlimannii with aged leaves.

Conservation status
- Endangered (IUCN 2.3)

Scientific classification
- Kingdom: Plantae
- Clade: Tracheophytes
- Clade: Angiosperms
- Clade: Eudicots
- Clade: Rosids
- Order: Malpighiales
- Family: Salicaceae
- Genus: Xylosma
- Species: X. hurlimannii

Binomial name
- Xylosma hurlimannii Guillaumin

Synonyms
- Lasiochlamys huerlimannii (Guillaumin) Sleumer; Lasiochlamys hurlimannii (Guillaumin) Sleumer; Lasiochlamys hürlimannii (Guillaumin) Sleumer; Xylosma huerlimannii Guillaumin; Xylosma hürlimannii Guillaumin

= Xylosma hurlimannii =

Species of flowering plant

Xylosma hurlimannii (syn. Lasiochlamys hurlimannii) is a species of flowering plant in the family Salicaceae, endemic to New Caledonia. Formerly a member of Lasiochlamys, the name was reinstated in 2023 when the genus was transferred to Xylosma. It is listed as a protected species by the National Natural Heritage Inventory and was classified as endangered by the IUCN Red List in 1998.

== Description ==
Xylosma hurlimannii is a shrub or tree reaching up to a reported 2 m (6 ft 7 in) in height, characterized by a spreading habit with long brown branches that are rugose, densely lenticellate, and minutely puberulous. The leaves are almost discoid, measuring up to 7 cm (2.8 in) long and 6 cm (2.4 in) wide; the apex is obtuse or rounded, the base is rounded or slightly cordate, and the margins are subdentate. The veins come in pairs that form a reticulate pattern; the petiole is short and minutely puberulous, measuring 5 mm (0.20 in) long.

The flowers grow in fascicles, and are connected by a small articulated pedicel. The tepals measure 1.5 mm (0.059 in); the outer ones are glabrous and have an acute or triangular apex, while the inner tepals are pilose and feature a truncate apex, both sets displaying ciliolate margins. Female flowers bear an ampullaceous or globose ovary featuring an attenuate apex that is tipped by reniform stigmas; the fruit is green.

== Distribution and habitat ==
The range of Xylosma hurlimannii is restricted to New Caledonia, and is only documented from a small extent in southeastern Grande Terre, occupying the communes of Dumbéa and Païta. It is exclusively recorded from the Couvélée Mountains and the areas surrounding it.

Xylosma hurlimannii is a tropical species reported from a narrow range of habitats at elevations of up to 800 m (2,600 ft). Being found in montane and submontane environments, it occurs in valleys and along ridges. Additionally, it is noted to be in loose upland forest on serpentine substrates covered in scree.

== Taxonomy ==
Xylosma hurlimannii was first described by André Guillaumin in 1953 uunder the same name it has today; although later switched to Xylosma hürlimannii, it was a redundant change. In 1974, the taxon was reassigned to Lasiochlamys by Hermann Otto Sleumer, still in Flacourtiaceae; the epithet given to it was hürlimannii, later corrected to hurlimannii, and alternative spelled huerlimannii. This system was brief however, as Sleumer would hastily refute the accuracy of the family in 1975. As a result, Lasiochlamys hurlimannii, along with its genus, were changed to be in Salicaceae.

An ecological study in 1980 by Tanguy Jaffré noted that Lasiochlamys could be differentiated from Xylosma for lacking the property of accumulating nickel, but this would later prove ineffective as a distinguishing trait. In 2005, Mac Haverson Alford published a thesis in which Lasiochlamys was suggested to be nested in Xylosma based on molecular phylogenetic analysis. It was not until 2023 however, when Lasiochlamys was ultimately synonymized with Xylosma by Yohan Pillon, resulting in the transfer of all of its species to the new classification. This revision resulted in the renaming of Lasiochlamys hurlimannii to its now recognized name; Xylosma hurlimannii, which cites Guillaumin as the author once more. Decades earlier, Xylosma underwent a gender agreement whose purpose was to match the specific epithets with the female generic name; it was likely initiated by William T. Stearn in 1992 when he commented on the gender inaccuracy, and finalized by Dan Henry Nicolson in 1994. Despite this, Xylosma hurlimannii would not have been subject to it because its epithet is a genitive noun, which remains unchanged regardless of gender; another reason would be that it was in Lasiochlamys at the time, which has a female generic name.

=== Etymology ===
The generic name Xylosma derives from xylon (Ancient Greek: ξύλον), meaning "wood" or "tree", and osmé (Ancient Greek: ὀσμή), meaning "smell", overall referring to the aromatic wood found in some species. The specific epithet, hurlimannii, is in honor of Hans Hürlimann, a Swiss botanist who collected its type specimen. As for the defunct genus Lasiochlamys, it stems from lasio- (Ancient Greek: λάσιος), meaning "hairy", and chlamys (Ancient Greek: χλαμύς), meaning "cloak".

== Conservation status ==
Xylosma hurlimannii was classified as endangered by the IUCN Red List under its old name in 1998; the assessment itself has many missing elements and needs updating due to its age. It is listed as a protected species by the National Natural Heritage Inventory also under its previous name, though further information on its status is absent.
