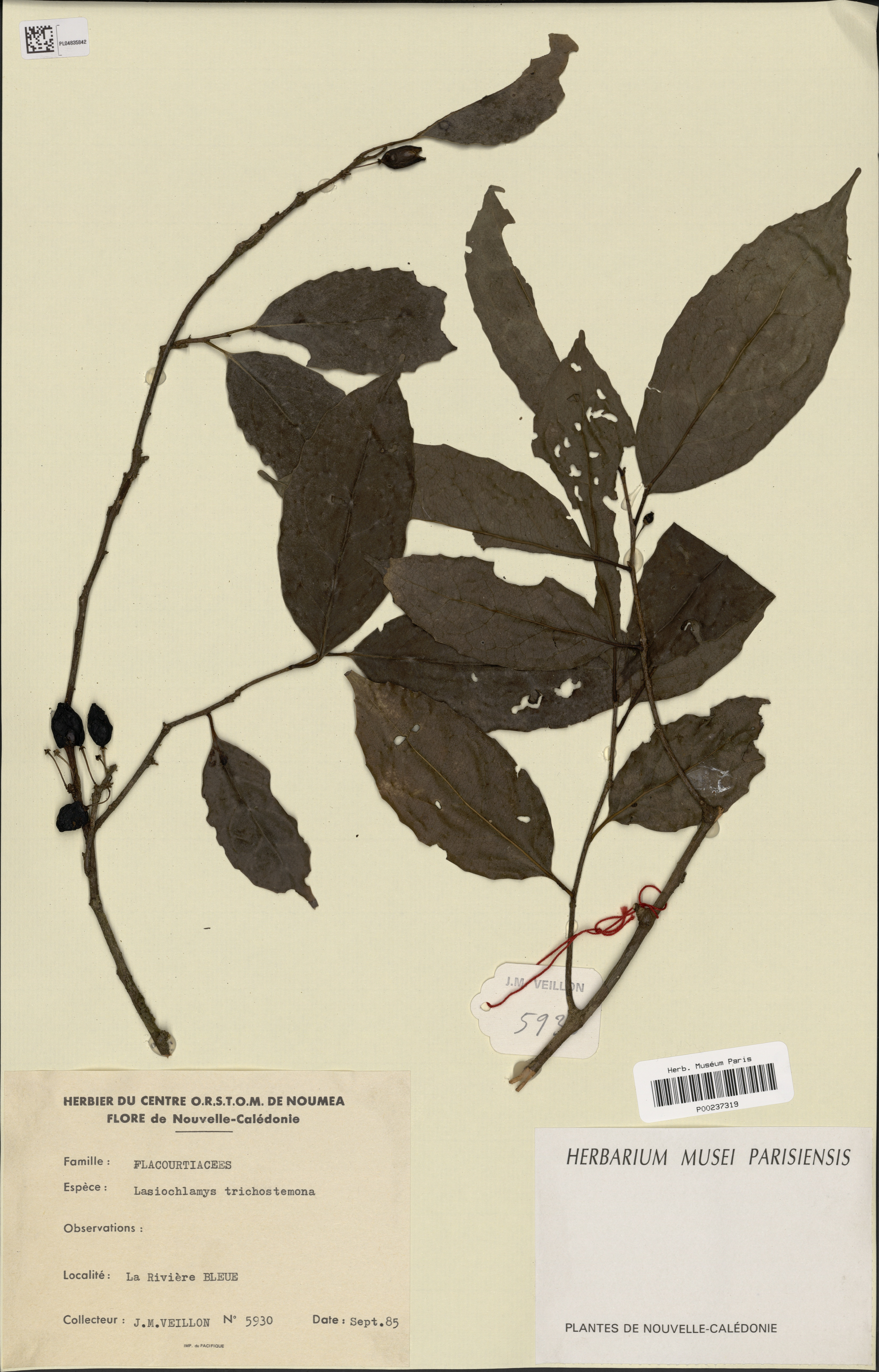
- A herbarium specimen of Xylosma trichostemona with aged leaves and fruits.

Conservation status
- Conservation Dependent (IUCN 2.3)

Scientific classification
- Kingdom: Plantae
- Clade: Tracheophytes
- Clade: Angiosperms
- Clade: Eudicots
- Clade: Rosids
- Order: Malpighiales
- Family: Salicaceae
- Genus: Xylosma
- Species: X. trichostemona

Binomial name
- Xylosma trichostemona Guillaumin

Synonyms
- Lasiochlamys trichostemona (Guillaumin) Sleumer; Xylosma trichostemon Guillaumin

= Xylosma trichostemona =

Species of flowering plant

Xylosma trichostemona (syn. Lasiochlamys trichostemona) is a species of flowering plant in the family Salicaceae, endemic to New Caledonia. Formerly a member of Lasiochlamys, the name was reinstated in 2023 when the genus was transferred to Xylosma. It is listed as a protected species by the National Natural Heritage Inventory and was classified as conservation dependent by the IUCN Red List in 1998.

== Description ==
Xylosma trichostemona is a ramified shrub or tree reaching up to a reported 8 m (26 ft) in height, characterized by plagiotropic branches with grey bark that is both rugose and densely lenticellate. The leaves measure up to 15 cm (5.9 in) long and 7 cm (2.8 in) wide, are glabrous, glossy dark green, lighter below, and occasionally red in places; the shape is ovate or rotund, the apex is acuminate, the base is rounded or subcordate, and the margins are coarsely serrate. The leaf surface is pergamentaceous, and the veins come in pairs that form a reticulate pattern; the petiole is short and red in color, measuring 3 mm (0.12 in) long.

The flowers are both cauliflorous or ramiflorous, reportedly being green-white, viridescent, or just green; they grow in dense fascicles, connected by an articulated pedicel. The tepals are unequal and triangular, measuring roughly 3 mm (0.12 in); the outer tepals are glabrous outwards and densely lanuginose inwards, while the inner ones are nearly identical. Male flowers display stamens with filaments that are hairy, subulate, and topped by globose anthers; female flowers feature an ovary crowned by black stigmas that are both reniform and subsessile. The fruits are globose, measure up to 8 mm (0.31 in) in diameter, and are initially green, but mature to red or yellow.

== Distribution and habitat ==
The range of Xylosma trichostemona is restricted to New Caledonia, extending across southeastern Grande Terre, occurring across the communes of Dumbéa, Le Mont-Dore, and Yaté. Notable localities where it is present include the Rivière Bleue of both the Le Mont-Dore and Yaté communes; the valley of Thy in both the Dumbéa and Le Mont-Dore communes; and Mont Koghi and Pic Malaoui within the Dumbéa commune.

Xylosma trichostemona is a locally common tropical species reported from a range of habitats at elevations of up to 700 m (2,300 ft). Primarily found in montane and submontane habitats, it occurs in both sloped and flat forests, along ridges, and in valleys. Additionally, it is noted to be in wet forest on serpentine substrates.

== Taxonomy ==
Xylosma trichostemona was first described by André Guillaumin in 1953 under the same name it has today; although later changed to Xylosma trichostemon, it was a redundant correction. In 1974, the taxon was reassigned to Lasiochlamys by Hermann Otto Sleumer, still in Flacourtiaceae. This system was brief however, as Sleumer would hastily refute the accuracy of the family in 1975. As a result, Lasiochlamys trichostemona, along with its genus, were changed to be in Salicaceae.

An ecological study in 1980 by Tanguy Jaffré noted that Lasiochlamys could be differentiated from Xylosma for lacking the property of accumulating nickel, but this would later prove ineffective as a distinguishing trait. In 2005, Mac Haverson Alford published a thesis in which Lasiochlamys was suggested to be nested in Xylosma based on molecular phylogenetic analysis. It was not until 2023 however, when Lasiochlamys was ultimately synonymized with Xylosma by Yohan Pillon, resulting in the transfer of all of its species to the new classification. This revision resulted in the renaming of Lasiochlamys trichostemona to its now recognized name; Xylosma trichostemona, which cites Guillaumin as the author once more. Decades earlier, Xylosma underwent a gender agreement whose purpose was to match the specific epithets with the female generic name; it was likely initiated by William T. Stearn in 1992 when he commented on the gender inaccuracy, and finalized by Dan Henry Nicolson in 1994. Despite this, Xylosma trichostemona was technically not subject to it because it was in Lasiochlamys at the time, and that inadvertently corrected the name; this is due to the genus having a female name.

=== Etymology ===
The generic name Xylosma derives from xylon (Ancient Greek: ξύλον), meaning "wood" or "tree", and osmé (Ancient Greek: ὀσμή), meaning "smell", overall referring to the aromatic wood found in some species. The specific epithet, trichostemona, denotes the stamens, as the name stems from tricho- (Ancient Greek: θρίξ), meaning "hairy", and stemon (Ancient Greek: στημών), meaning "stamen", collectively addressing its hairy stamens. As for the defunct genus Lasiochlamys, it stems from lasio- (Ancient Greek: λάσιος), meaning "hairy," and chlamys (Ancient Greek: χλαμύς), meaning "cloak".

== Conservation status ==
Xylosma trichostemona was classified as conservation dependent by the IUCN Red List under its old name in 1998; the assessment itself has many missing elements and needs updating due to its age. It is listed as a protected species by the National Natural Heritage Inventory also under its previous name, though further information on its status is absent.
