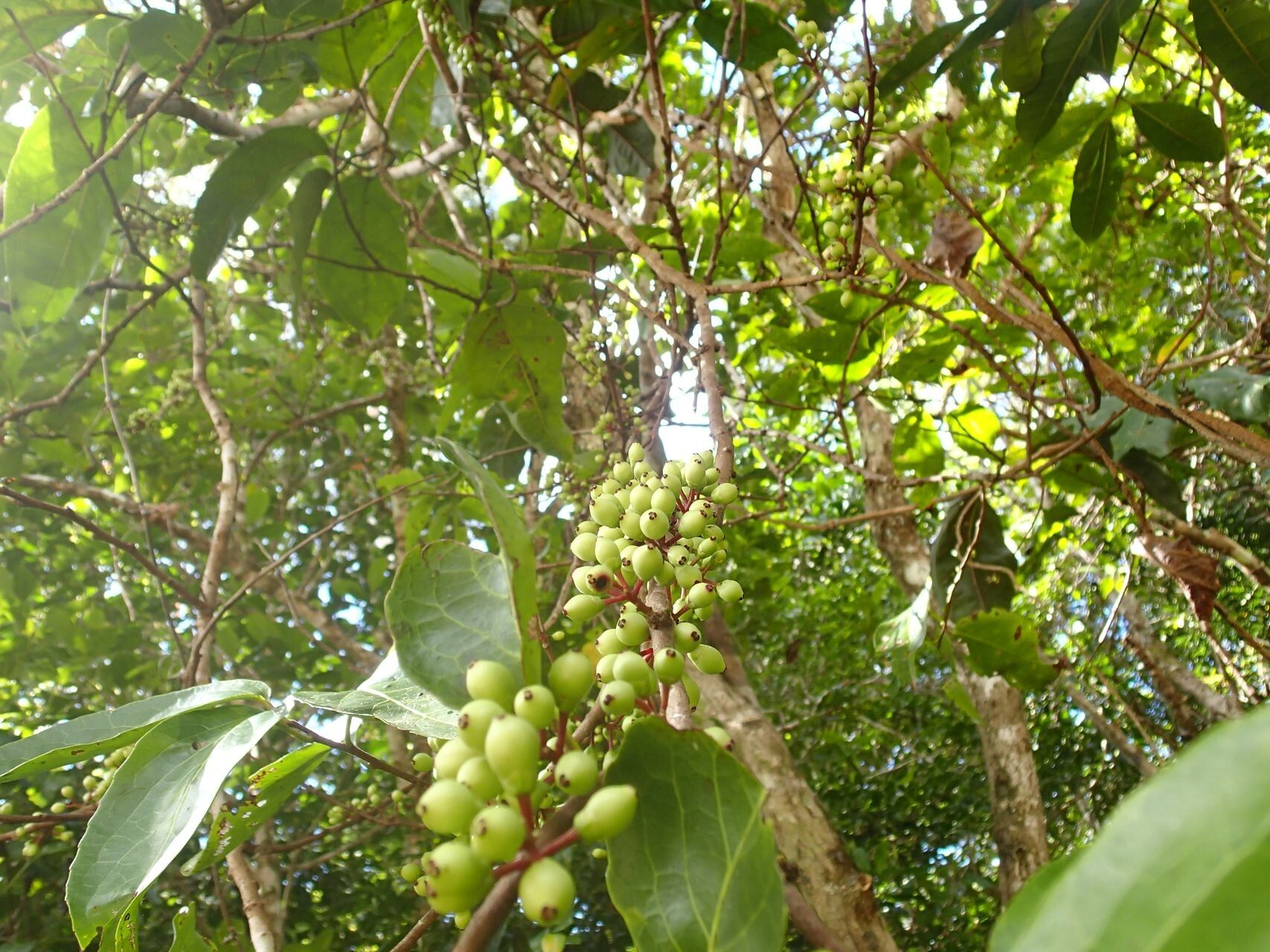
- The leaves and fruits of Xylosma cordifolia.

Scientific classification
- Kingdom: Plantae
- Clade: Tracheophytes
- Clade: Angiosperms
- Clade: Eudicots
- Clade: Rosids
- Order: Malpighiales
- Family: Salicaceae
- Genus: Xylosma
- Species: X. cordifolia

Binomial name
- Xylosma cordifolia (Sleumer) Pillon

Synonyms
- Lasiochlamys cordifolia Sleumer

= Xylosma cordifolia =

Species of flowering plant

Xylosma cordifolia (syn. Lasiochlamys cordifolia) is a species of flowering plant in the family Salicaceae, endemic to New Caledonia. Formerly a member of Lasiochlamys, the new name was given in 2023 when the genus was transferred to Xylosma. It is listed as a protected species by the National Natural Heritage Inventory.

== Description ==
Xylosma cordifolia is a ramified shrub reaching up to 8 m (26 ft) in height, characterized by a slender, erect, or arching habit. Its branches, which are occasionally green, are glabrous at the tips and densely marked by pale lenticels, appearing blackish when dry. The leaves, which are glossy dark green above and lighter green below, are elliptic to ovate, with an apex that is shortly attenuate or subacuminate, and a base that is often asymmetrical, rounded or subcordate. The leaf blades are glabrous and subcoriaceous, blackish when dry, and measure 7–11 cm (2.8–4.3 in) long and 3.5–6.5 cm (1.4–2.6 in) wide. The margins are subcrenate near the apex, generally slightly undulate or entire, and not revolute. The leaf venation is composed of lateral veins, which come in pairs, are fairly flat, and display a reticulate pattern. Petioles are slender, measuring 8–25 mm (0.31–0.98 in) long and about 1 mm (0.039 in) thick.

Inflorescences are axillary, arranged in fascicles or short racemes, and up to 1.5 cm (0.59 in) in diameter. Pedicels are slender, 3–5 mm (0.12–0.20 in) long, and slightly articulated above the base. The tepals are greenish or yellow; the outer four are thicker, ovate to subrounded, glabrous on the outside, ciliate on the edges, covered with fine white hairs inside, and are about 1.8 mm (0.071 in) long; the inner four are similar, although thinner and about half as long. The yelloish green female flowers bear a glabrous, ovoid or subglobose ovary and two sessile, multi-lobed stigmas. The fruits, although not formally described, are green, along with the flower buds.

== Distribution and habitat ==
The range of Xylosma cordifolia is restricted to New Caledonia, extending across central and north-central Grande Terre, occurring across the communes of Poindimié, Ponérihouen, Pouembout, Poya, and Touho. Notable localities where it is present include Mont Aoupinié of the Ponérihouen and Poya communes; and Mont Katalupaïk and the forest of Povila, both within the Poindimié commune. Outside of its native range, it has been preserved from Jamaica in Trelawny Parish, recorded from a wooded rocky limestone hillside.

Xylosma cordifolia is a locally rare tropical species reported from a range of habitats at elevations of up to 700 m (2,300 ft). Primarily found in montane and riparian environments, it occurs along forest edges, ridges, and slopes, and at riversides and catchments. Additionally, it is found in wet forests on both greywacke and schistose substrates.

== Taxonomy ==
Xylosma cordifolia was first described in 1974 by Hermann Otto Sleumer under the name Lasiochlamys cordifolia, in the family Flacourtiaceae. This system was brief however, as Sleumer would hastily refute the accuracy of the family in 1975. As a result, Lasiochlamys cordifolia, along with its genus, were changed to be in Salicaceae.

An ecological study in 1980 by Tanguy Jaffré noted that Lasiochlamys could be differentiated from Xylosma for lacking the property of accumulating nickel, but this would later prove ineffective as a distinguishing trait. In 2005, Mac Haverson Alford published a thesis in which Lasiochlamys was suggested to be nested in Xylosma based on molecular phylogenetic analysis. It was not until 2023 however, when Lasiochlamys was ultimately synonymized with Xylosma by Yohan Pillon, resulting in the transfer of all of its species to the new classification. This revision resulted in the renaming of Lasiochlamys cordifolia to its now recognized name; Xylosma cordifolia. Decades earlier, Xylosma underwent a gender agreement whose purpose was to match the specific epithets with the female generic name; it was likely initiated by William T. Stearn in 1992 when he commented on the gender inaccuracy, and finalized by Dan Henry Nicolson in 1994. Despite this, Xylosma cordifolia was not subject to it because the taxon was published after the agreement took place.

=== Etymology ===
The generic name Xylosma derives from xylon (Ancient Greek: ξύλον), meaning "wood" or "tree", and osmé (Ancient Greek: ὀσμή), meaning "smell", overall referring to the aromatic wood found in some species. The specific epithet, cordifolia, denotes the leaves, as it stems from cor, meaning "heart", and folium, meaning "leaf". As for the defunct genus Lasiochlamys, it stems from lasio- (Ancient Greek: λάσιος), meaning "hairy," and chlamys (Ancient Greek: χλαμύς), meaning "cloak".

== Conservation status ==
Xylosma cordifolia is listed as a protected species by the National Natural Heritage Inventory under its previous name, though further information on its status is absent.
