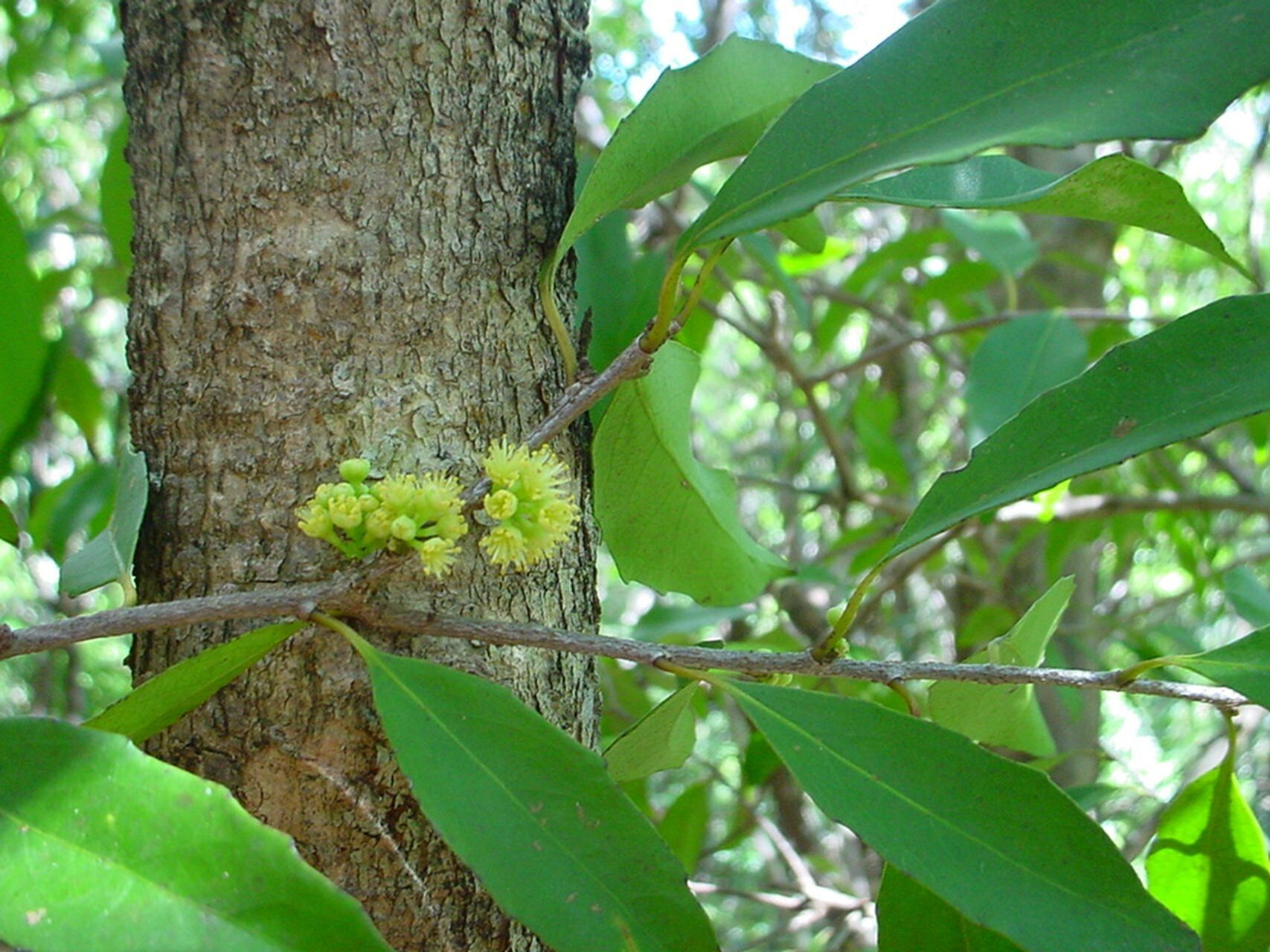
- The leaves and flowers of Xylosma grossecrenata.

Conservation status
- Endangered (IUCN 3.1)

Scientific classification
- Kingdom: Plantae
- Clade: Tracheophytes
- Clade: Angiosperms
- Clade: Eudicots
- Clade: Rosids
- Order: Malpighiales
- Family: Salicaceae
- Genus: Xylosma
- Species: X. grossecrenata

Binomial name
- Xylosma grossecrenata (Sleumer) Lescot

Synonyms
- Lasiochlamys grossecrenata Sleumer; Xylosma grossecrenatum (Sleumer) Lescot

= Xylosma grossecrenata =

Species of flowering plant

Xylosma grossecrenata (syn. Lasiochlamys grossecrenata) is a species of flowering plant in the family Salicaceae, endemic to New Caledonia. Formerly a member of Lasiochlamys, the name was given in 1980 when this taxon was transferred to Xylosma. It is listed as a protected species by the National Natural Heritage Inventory and is classified as endangered by the IUCN Red List.

== Description ==
Xylosma grossecrenata is an erect shrub or tree reaching up to a reported 4 m (13 ft) in height, characterized by a slender habit with plagiotropic branches featuring grey bark that is densely lenticellate. The leaves measure up to 5 cm (2.0 in) long and 2 cm (0.79 in) wide, are glabrous, glossy dark green above, lighter below, and blackish-brown when dried; the shape is oblong, the apex is subacuminate, obtuse, or subrounded, the base is attenuate or cuneate, and the margins are coarsely crenate. The leaf surface is subcoriaceous, and the veins come in pairs that form a reticulate pattern; the petiole is short, measuring up to 7 mm (0.28 in) long.

The flowers are reportedly greenish, growing in fascicles or axillary racemes, connected by an articulated pedicel. The tepals are ovate or orbicular, measuring 1.5 mm (0.059 in) long; the outer tepals are glabrous or pubescent outwards and sericeous inwards, while the inner tepals are similar but often smaller, both sets displaying ciliate margins. Female flowers feature an ovary with an attenuate apex crowned by stigmas that are both reniform and sessile. The fruits are ovoid or subglobose, apiculate, measure roughly 1 cm (0.39 in) in diameter, and contain up to four small seeds.

== Distribution and habitat ==
The range of Xylosma grossecrenata is restricted to New Caledonia, extending across west-central Grande Terre, occurring across the communes of Bourail, Koné, Pouembout, and Poya. Notable localities where it is present include the Nessadiou River of the Bourail commune; the Népoui River of the Poya commune; and Pic de Tiaoué of the Pouembout commune.

Xylosma grossecrenata is a locally rare tropical species reported from a range of habitats at elevations of up to 526 m (1,726 ft). Being found in montane and riparian environments, it is recorded from peaks and along riversides, but is primarily found in dry forest. Additionally, it is noted to occur on black clay substrates in dense lowland forest lacking serpentine content and in the undergrowth of sclerophyll forest.

== Taxonomy ==
Xylosma grossecrenata was first described by Hermann Otto Sleumer in 1974 under the name Lasiochlamys grossecrenata, placed within Flacourtiaceae. This system was brief however, as Sleumer would hastily refute the accuracy of the family in 1975. As a result, Lasiochlamys grossecrenata, along with its genus, were changed to be in Salicaceae. In 1980, Michèle Lescot transferred Lasiochlamys grossecrenata to Xylosma, changing its name to Xylosma grossecrenatum; it was moved because of Lescot's interpretations on the floral morphology of the plant. Later, Xylosma underwent a gender agreement whose purpose was to match the specific epithets with the female generic name; it was likely initiated by William T. Stearn in 1992 when he commented on the gender inaccuracy, and finalized by Dan Henry Nicolson in 1994. This agreement led to Xylosma grossecrenatum becoming aligned with the generic gender, now recognized as Xylosma grossecrenata.

After Lescot's contributions, the history of Lasiochlamys developed as follows: An ecological study in 1980 by Tanguy Jaffré noted that Lasiochlamys could be differentiated from Xylosma for lacking the property of accumulating nickel, but this would later prove ineffective as a distinguishing trait. In 2005, Mac Haverson Alford published a thesis in which Lasiochlamys was suggested to be nested in Xylosma based on molecular phylogenetic analysis. It was not until 2023 however, when Lasiochlamys was ultimately synonymized with Xylosma by Yohan Pillon, resulting in the transfer of all of its remaining species to the new classification.

=== Etymology ===
The generic name Xylosma derives from xylon (Ancient Greek: ξύλον), meaning "wood" or "tree", and osmé (Ancient Greek: ὀσμή), meaning "smell", overall referring to the aromatic wood found in some species. The specific epithet, grossecrenata, denotes the leaf margins, as the name stems from grosse, meaning "coarsely", and crenatus, meaning "crenate". As for the defunct genus Lasiochlamys, it stems from lasio- (Ancient Greek: λάσιος), meaning "hairy," and chlamys (Ancient Greek: χλαμύς), meaning "cloak".

== Conservation status ==
Xylosma grossecrenata is classified as endangered by the IUCN Red List, primarily due to threats such as agricultural expansion, cattle grazing, wildfires, flooding, and invasive species. Wildfires have significantly altered its native habitat, converting forests into shrubland dominated by Acacia spirorbis and Leucaena leucocephala, or into savannas of Melaleuca quinquenervia. The introduction of Rusa timorensis, an invasive deer species from Malesia, has caused deleterious effects to plant populations within New Caledonia, both by consuming them and rubbing their antlers against tree stems; this has affected the extent of Xylosma grossecrenata as well. Although the species exists within at least two protected areas, its survival depends on urgent ex situ conservation measures and artificial propagation to counter ongoing habitat degradation and biological pressures.

Additionally, it is listed as a protected species by the National Natural Heritage Inventory, though further information on its status is absent.
