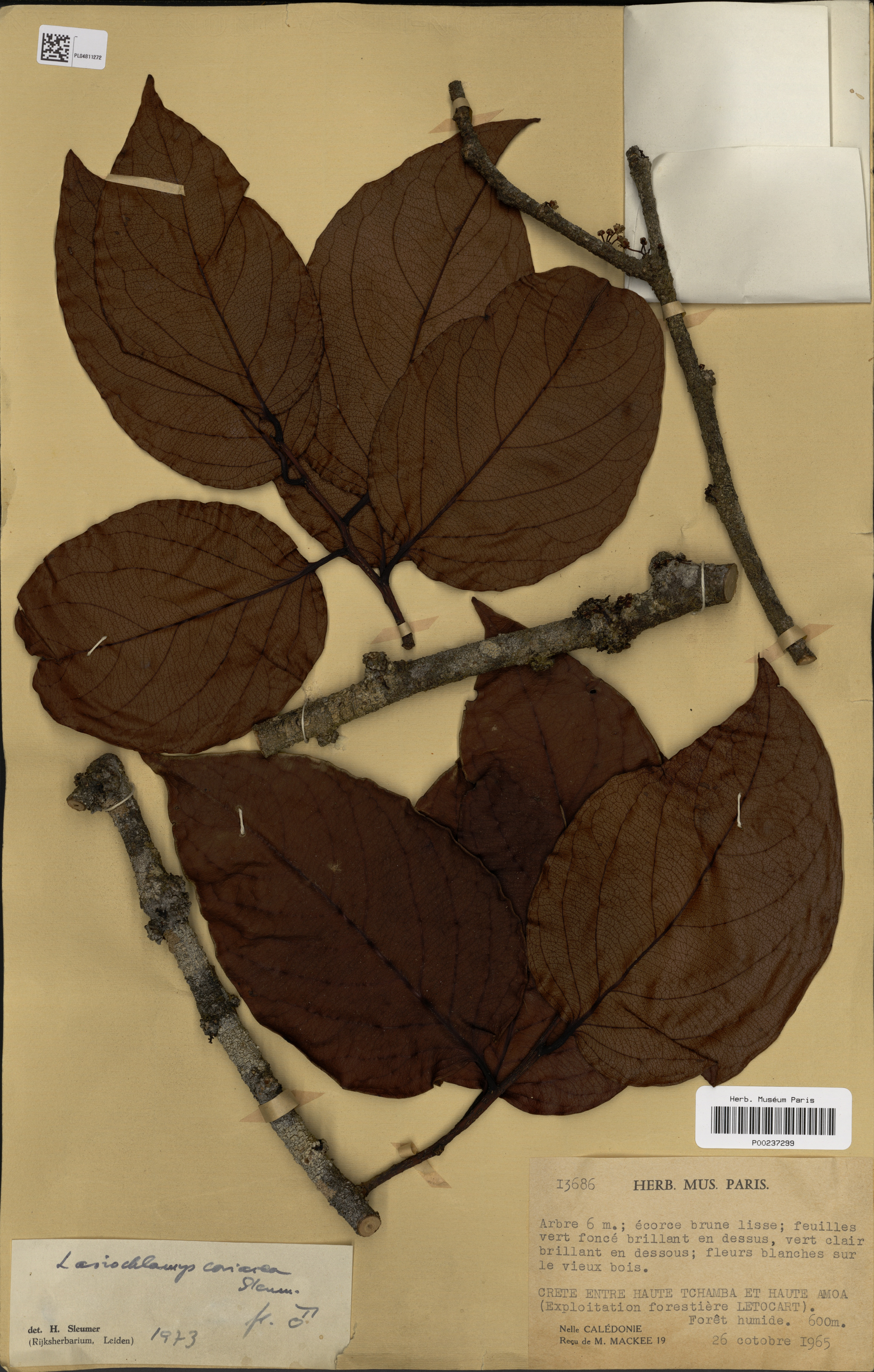
- A herbarium specimen of Xylosma zongoi with aged leaves and floral remnants.

Scientific classification
- Kingdom: Plantae
- Clade: Tracheophytes
- Clade: Angiosperms
- Clade: Eudicots
- Clade: Rosids
- Order: Malpighiales
- Family: Salicaceae
- Genus: Xylosma
- Species: X. zongoi

Binomial name
- Xylosma zongoi Pillon

Synonyms
- Lasiochlamys coriacea Sleumer

= Xylosma zongoi =

Species of flowering plant

Xylosma zongoi (syn. Lasiochlamys coriacea) is a species of flowering plant in the family Salicaceae, endemic to New Caledonia. Formerly a member of Lasiochlamys, the new name was given in 2023 when the genus was transferred to Xylosma. It is listed as a protected species by the National Natural Heritage Inventory.

== Description ==
Xylosma zongoi is a ramified shrub or small tree reaching up to 6 m (20 ft) tall, with either arching or upright branches. The trunk has smooth brown bark, while the flowering branches are about 1 cm (0.39 in) thick and covered in dark fissured bark. Young branchlets are glabrous, but older ones soon develop reddish-brown bark densely marked with pale lenticels. The leaves are alternate and coriaceous, shaped from ovate to elliptic. Their tips are broadly attenuate or subacuminate, and the bases range from broadly cuneate to rounded or obtuse. The leaf surface is glossy and glabrous, reddish when young, turning dark green on top and light green underneath, and drying to a reddish-brown hue. The margins are subcrenate to undulate, and the blades measure 9–15 cm (3.5–5.9 in) long and 5–11 cm (2.0–4.3 in) wide, with 7–8 pairs of lateral veins that are slightly raised on the underside, forming a reticulate pattern. The petioles are glabrous, measuring 1–2 cm (0.39–0.79 in) long and 2–3 mm (0.079–0.118 in) thick.

The flowers are both cauliflorous or ramiflorous, reportedly yellow, white, or even pink in color, growing in small fascicles of up to 7. The peduncles are sturdy and glabrous, reportedly red, and are slightly jointed near the base, measuring 5–7 mm (0.20–0.28 in) long. The thick tepals, which number up to 8 in total, measure 3 mm (0.12 in) long and 2 mm (0.079 in) wide, displaying minor differences between the inner and outer ones. The outer tepals are ovate and ciliate, glabrous on the outside, and pubescent on the inside; while the inner ones are smaller but similar. Male flowers contain up to 50 stamens, with short hairy filaments and small, barely pointed anthers. Female flowers have a glabrous, globose ovary with four ovules, and a short style ending in two reniform stigmas. The fruit is ovoid to nearly round, initially green, turning to colors reportedly ranging from yellow to mauve, and ripening to black; measuring about 7 mm (0.28 in) long and 5 mm (0.20 in) wide.

== Distribution and habitat ==
The range of Xylosma zongoi is restricted to New Caledonia, extending across northern and north-central Grande Terre, occurring across the communes of Hienghène, Ouégoa, Poindimié, Ponérihouen, Pouébo, Poya, and Touho. Notable localities where it is present include the Diahot River and Mont Mandjélia of the Ouégoa and Pouébo communes; Mont Boulinda of the Ponérihouen commune; and Mont Katalupaïk of the Poindimié commune.

Xylosma zongoi is a locally common tropical species recorded from a range of habitats at elevations of up to 805 m (2,641 ft). Found primarily in montane and submontane environments, it has been sighted at summits, slopes, and forest edges. In addition, it is also found in wet forests on mica schists.

== Taxonomy ==
Xylosma zongoi was first described in 1974 by Hermann Otto Sleumer under the name Lasiochlamys coriacea, in the family Flacourtiaceae. This system was brief however, as Sleumer would hastily refute the accuracy of the family in 1975. As a result, Lasiochlamys coriacea, along with its genus, were changed to be in Salicaceae.

An ecological study in 1980 by Tanguy Jaffré noted that Lasiochlamys could be differentiated from Xylosma for lacking the property of accumulating nickel, but this would later prove ineffective as a distinguishing trait. In 2005, Mac Haverson Alford published a thesis in which Lasiochlamys was suggested to be nested in Xylosma based on molecular phylogenetic analysis. It was not until 2023 however, when Lasiochlamys was ultimately synonymized with Xylosma by Yohan Pillon, resulting in the transfer of all of its species to the new classification. This revision resulted in the renaming of Lasiochlamys coriacea to its now recognized name; Xylosma zongoi. Its original specific epithet was replaced because it was already occupied by Xylosma coriacea, a taxon authored by August W. Eichler in 1871. Decades earlier, Xylosma underwent a gender agreement whose purpose was to match the specific epithets with the female generic name; it was likely initiated by William T. Stearn in 1992 when he commented on the gender inaccuracy, and finalized by Dan Henry Nicolson in 1994. Despite this, Xylosma zongoi was not subject to it because the taxon was published after the agreement took place.

=== Etymology ===
The generic name Xylosma derives from xylon (Ancient Greek: ξύλον), meaning "wood" or "tree", and osmé (Ancient Greek: ὀσμή), meaning "smell", overall referring to the aromatic wood found in some species. The specific epithet, zongoi, is in honor of Charly Zongo, a botanist who made contributions to plant knowledge within New Caledonia. As for the defunct genus Lasiochlamys, it stems from lasio- (Ancient Greek: λάσιος), meaning "hairy", and chlamys (Ancient Greek: χλαμύς), meaning "cloak". The initial specific epithet, coriacea, denotes its leaves, as it means "leathery".

== Conservation status ==
Xylosma zongoi is listed as a protected species by the National Natural Heritage Inventory under its previous name, though further information on its status is absent.
