= Xylosma peltata =

Conservation status
- Critically Endangered (IUCN 2.3)

Scientific classification
- Kingdom: Plantae
- Clade: Tracheophytes
- Clade: Angiosperms
- Clade: Eudicots
- Clade: Rosids
- Order: Malpighiales
- Family: Salicaceae
- Genus: Xylosma
- Species: X. peltata

Binomial name
- Xylosma peltata (Sleumer) Lescot

Synonyms
- Lasiochlamys peltata Sleumer; Xylosma peltatum (Sleumer) Lescot

Species of flowering plant

Xylosma peltata (syn. Lasiochlamys peltata) is a species of flowering plant in the family Salicaceae, endemic to New Caledonia. Formerly a member of Lasiochlamys, the name was given in 1980 when this taxon was transferred to Xylosma. It is listed as a protected species by the National Natural Heritage Inventory and was classified as critically endangered by the IUCN Red List in 1998.

== Description ==
Xylosma peltata is an aromatic, erect shrub or tree reaching up to a reported 5 m (16 ft) in height, characterized by drooping or leaning branches featuring thin bark that is both puberulous and lenticellate. The leaves measure up to 8.5 cm (3.3 in) long and 6.5 cm (2.6 in) wide, are glabrous, slightly revolute, glossy dark green above, lighter below, and olive green when dried; the shape is ovate or suborbicular and peltate shortly above the base, while the apex is obtuse or acuminate, the base is rounded or subcordate, and the margins are subserrate or obtusely crenate. The leaf surface is coriaceous, and the veins come in pairs that form a reticulate pattern; the petiole is short and robust, measuring up to 2.3 m (7 ft 7 in) long.

The flowers are whitish, pale yellow, or even dark red, growing in fascicles or axillary racemes, connected by an articulated pedicel. The tepals are ovate or suborbicular, measuring up to 2.2 mm (0.087 in) long and 2.7 mm (0.11 in) wide; the outer tepals are glabrous or pubescent outwards and silky or tomentose inwards, while the inner tepals are similar but often smaller, both sets displaying ciliolate margins. Female flowers feature an ovary with an apex crowned by reniform stigmas. The fruits are ovoid or subglobose, apiculate, turn black when dried, measure roughly 8 mm (0.31 in), and contain up to four small seeds.

== Distribution and habitat ==
The range of Xylosma peltata is restricted to New Caledonia and is documented only from a limited area in southeastern Grande Terre, exclusively occupying the commune of Yaté. It has been recorded from just two localities: Touaourou, a hamlet south of the commune's administrative center, and the Kuébéni River.

Xylosma peltata is a tropical species reported from a narrow range of habitats at elevations of up to 150 m (490 ft). Being found in submontane and littoral environments, it inhabits dense humid forest on slopes and along coasts and streams, growing in stony scree soil on ultramafic substrates; it additionally occurs in low riparian forest on rocky peridotite banks.

== Taxonomy ==
Xylosma peltata was first described by Hermann Otto Sleumer in 1974 under the name Lasiochlamys peltata, placed within Flacourtiaceae. This system was brief however, as Sleumer would hastily refute the accuracy of the family in 1975. As a result, Lasiochlamys peltata, along with its genus, were changed to be in Salicaceae. In 1980, Michèle Lescot transferred Lasiochlamys peltata to Xylosma, changing its name to Xylosma peltatum; it was moved because of Lescot's interpretations on the floral morphology of the plant. Later, Xylosma underwent a gender agreement whose purpose was to match the specific epithets with the female generic name; it was likely initiated by William T. Stearn in 1992 when he commented on the gender inaccuracy, and finalized by Dan Henry Nicolson in 1994. This agreement led to Xylosma peltatum becoming aligned with the generic gender, now recognized as Xylosma peltata.

After Lescot's contributions, the history of Lasiochlamys developed as follows: An ecological study in 1980 by Tanguy Jaffré noted that Lasiochlamys could be differentiated from Xylosma for lacking the property of accumulating nickel, but this would later prove ineffective as a distinguishing trait. In 2005, Mac Haverson Alford published a thesis in which Lasiochlamys was suggested to be nested in Xylosma based on molecular phylogenetic analysis. It was not until 2023 however, when Lasiochlamys was ultimately synonymized with Xylosma by Yohan Pillon, resulting in the transfer of all of its remaining species to the new classification.

=== Etymology ===
The generic name Xylosma derives from xylon (Ancient Greek: ξύλον), meaning "wood" or "tree", and osmé (Ancient Greek: ὀσμή), meaning "smell", overall referring to the aromatic wood found in some species. The specific epithet, peltata, denotes the petiole attachment, as it means "shield-shaped"; this represents the morphology where the leaf blade is centrally attached, resembling a shield. As for the defunct genus Lasiochlamys, it stems from lasio- (Ancient Greek: λάσιος), meaning "hairy," and chlamys (Ancient Greek: χλαμύς), meaning "cloak".

== Conservation status ==
Xylosma peltata was classified as critically endangered by the IUCN Red List in 1998; the assessment itself has many missing elements and needs updating due to its age. Additionally, it is listed as a protected species by the National Natural Heritage Inventory, though further information on its status is absent.
