= Xylosma schwaneckeana =

Schwaneck's logwood

Conservation status
- Critically Imperiled (NatureServe)

Scientific classification
- Kingdom: Plantae
- Clade: Embryophytes
- Clade: Tracheophytes
- Clade: Angiosperms
- Clade: Eudicots
- Clade: Rosids
- Order: Malpighiales
- Family: Salicaceae
- Genus: Xylosma
- Species: X. schwaneckeana

Binomial name
- Xylosma schwaneckeana (Krug & Urb.) Urb.

Synonyms (Note: The synonymy of Xylosma schwaneckeana remains mildly contested across different sources, with only disputes over its taxonomic classification rooted in historical misattributions posing enduring confusion.)
- List: Myroxylon schwaneckeanum Krug & Urb.; Xylosma schwaneckeanum (Krug & Urb.) Urb.

Species of flowering plant

Xylosma schwaneckeana, generally known as Schwaneck's logwood, is a species of flowering plant in the family Salicaceae, endemically distributed throughout Puerto Rico.

== Description ==
Xylosma schwaneckeana is an evergreen, polygamodioecious shrub or small tree reaching 5–8 m (16–26 ft) in height, typically unarmed, with smooth brown bark and slender, glabrous, lenticellate twigs. The alternate, often distichous leaves are ovate to ovate-oblong or ovate-elliptic, 5–14 cm (2.0–5.5 in) long and 2.5–6 cm (0.98–2.36 in) wide, leathery, glossy on both surfaces, and display an acuminate apex with a Base that is obtuse to subcordate. Margins are remotely glandular-serrate to crenate, with 8–10 pairs of lateral veins and prominent dense reticulation on both surfaces; petioles are stout, 3–6 mm (0.12–0.24 in) long, sometimes slightly puberulous. inflorescences are axillary, typically fasciculate or racemiform, bearing 3–40 flowers on slender, glabrous, basally articulated pedicels that are 3–7 mm (0.12–0.28 in) long. Flowers are unisexual or bisexual; sepals numbering 4–5 are suborbicular, white, glabrous, and 2.5–3 mm (0.098–0.118 in) in diameter with slightly erose margins; petals are absent. Staminate flowers contain 40–70 stamens with roughly 3 mm (0.12 in) long filaments; bisexual flowers have 15–20 stamens and an ovoid ovary measuring approximately 2 mm (0.079 in), with 3–4 thick, short, divergent styles ending in semiorbicular, finely striate stigmas. The fleshy disc consists of 12–16 free or partially fused truncate squamules (~0.7–0.8 mm). The fruit is an ovoid to ovate-acuminate red berry, 12–14 mm (0.47–0.55 in) long and roughly 8 mm (0.31 in) in diameter, glabrous, with persistent sepals and styles. Each fruit contains 5–8 smooth, brown, laterally compressed seeds, 3.5–4 mm (0.14–0.16 in) long and 1.8–2 mm (0.071–0.079 in) wide, suspended by filiform funiculi; cotyledons are flat, green, and ovoid.

== Distribution ==
The extent of Xylosma schwaneckeana is rather small, isolated to the Caribbean within Puerto Rico. Within its range, it can be found in the El Yunque National Forest and Carite State Forest, additionally recorded in Sierra de Cayey and Sierra de Luquillo.

== Ecology ==
Xylosma schwaneckeana is a plant of the wet tropical biome, found in subtropical forests, montane forests, and volcanic environments at elevations of 350–1,000 m (1,150–3,280 ft).

== Taxonomy ==
Xylosma schwaneckeana was first described by Karl Wilhelm Leopold Krug & Ignatz Urban in 1892 as Myroxylon schwaneckeanum, later reassigned by Urban in 1899 to Xylosma schwaneckeanum. Later, the genus underwent a grammatical gender concordance, initiated by William T. Stearn in 1992 when he questioned the genus's gender, and finalized by Dan Henry Nicolson in 1994, putting Xylosma schwaneckeana in agreement with the genus name. The collective number of synonyms across different sources is approximately 2.

Historically, Xylosma schwaneckeana was placed in Flacourtiaceae under older classification systems such as those of Cronquist and Takhtajan. Eventually, Flacourtiaceae, including this taxon, were reclassified into Salicaceae, a placement adopted by the APG III system and subsequently recognized by Plants of the World Online, though this classification remains disputed.

=== Etymology ===
Regionally, the plant is known by candela, palo colorado, and palo de candela, and is generally known as redstick and Schwaneck's logwood.

The genus name Xylosma derives from xylon (Ancient Greek: ξύλον), meaning 'wood' or 'tree', and osmé (Ancient Greek: ὀσμή), meaning "smell," overall referring to the aromatic wood found in some species. The species epithet schwaneckeana is likely in honor of Carl Schwanecke, who collected a specimen of the plant.

== Conservation status ==
Xylosma schwaneckeana is classified as Critically Imperiled by NatureServe due to its extremely limited distribution and low population numbers. Fewer than 250 individuals have been documented, and while the species benefits from partial protection within these public lands, its long-term viability remains uncertain. No federal or international legal protection currently applies, and major threats to its habitat have not yet been fully assessed. Continued monitoring, habitat surveys, and strategic conservation efforts are recommended to safeguard its remaining populations.
