= Xylosma pachyphylla =

Conservation status
- Critically Endangered (IUCN 2.3)

Scientific classification
- Kingdom: Plantae
- Clade: Tracheophytes
- Clade: Angiosperms
- Clade: Eudicots
- Clade: Rosids
- Order: Malpighiales
- Family: Salicaceae
- Genus: Xylosma
- Species: X. pachyphylla

Binomial name
- Xylosma pachyphylla (Krug & Urb.) Urb.

Synonyms
- Myroxylon pachyphyllum Krug & Urb.

Species of plant

Xylosma pachyphylla, commonly known as spiny logwood, is a species of flowering plant in the family Salicaceae, that is endemic to Puerto Rico. It can be found in forests on the island's western mountains, where it grows in serpentine soils. It is threatened by habitat loss.
