= Léon Diguet =

French naturalist (1859–1926)

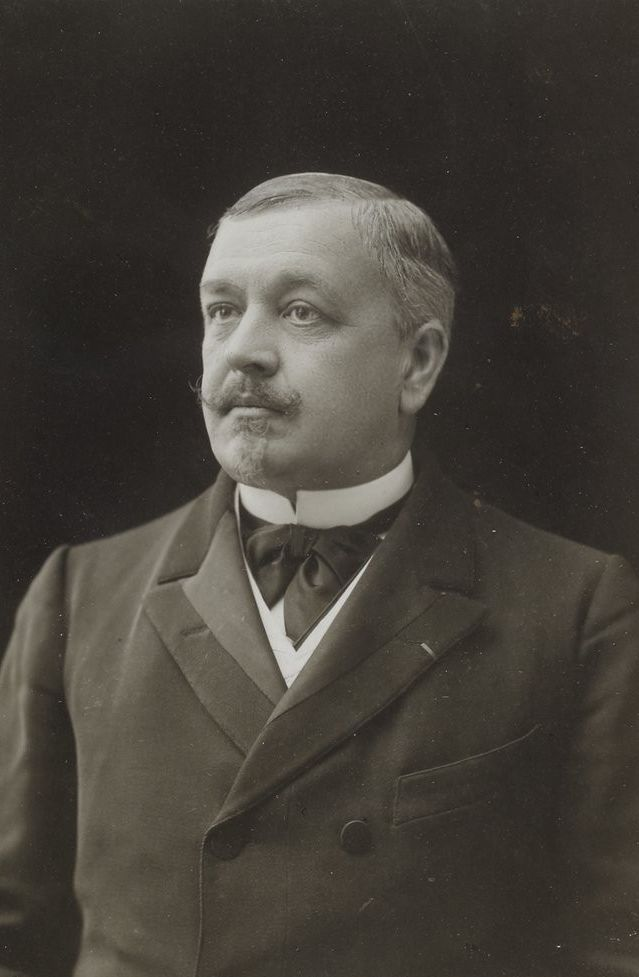
Léon Diguet

Léon Diguet (25 July 1859, Le Havre – 31 August 1926, Paris) was a French naturalist.

He studied science at the Muséum national d'histoire naturelle in Paris, where he was influenced by scientists that included biologist Jean Louis Armand de Quatrefages de Bréau, zoologist Alphonse Milne-Edwards, and anthropologist Ernest Hamy. From 1889 to 1892, he was employed as a chemical engineer at the French-owned El Boleo mining installation in Santa Rosalia, Baja California Sur. During that period, he explored the peninsula's interior, collecting natural history specimens for the National Museum of Natural History in Paris. Afterwards, from 1893 to 1914, he made six more trips to Mexico as an explorer and collector:

- 1. A return trip to Baja California in 1893–1894.
- 2. Jalisco and the territory of Tepic (a trip in which he conducted research of the Huichol and Cora peoples).
- 3. San Luis Potosi, Colima and northern Jalisco.
- 4. Puebla, Oaxaca and Tehuantepec.
- 5. Michoacán and the State of Mexico.
- 6. Another expedition to Baja California and Jalisco.

As a naturalist in Mexico, he amassed an eclectic collection of insects, cacti, orchids, minerals, crustaceans, and other specimens. He performed archaeological studies in the Mixtec-Zapotec region and at Ixtlán del Río, as well as pioneering investigations of the burials and rock art in central and southern Baja California. He also conducted historical research of cochineal, studied the Huichol language, analyzed the different types of agave and investigated the properties of jojoba. On his journeys, he took many photographs of the country. the negatives later being housed at the Musée de l'Homme in Paris.

The genus Diguetia bears his name, and his name is also associated with numerous zoological and botanical species, two examples being: Sceloporus digueti (synonym Sceloporus orcutti, the granite spiny lizard) and Ferrocactus diguetii (a species of barrel cactus).

== Partial list of publications ==
- "23 phot. du Mexique (Etats de Jalisco et Sinaloa) en 1892 par Léon Diguet, donateur en 1893".
- "Note sur la pictographie de la Basse-Californie." L'Anthropologie 6:160-175. 1895.
- "Rapport sur une mission scientifique dans la Basse-Californie." Nouvelle Archives des Missions Scientifiques et Littéraires 9:1-53. 1899.
- "La sierra du Nayarit et ses indigénes", 1899.
- "Les cactacées utiles du Mexique", published posthumously by André Guillaumin in 1928.
- "Fotografias del Nayar y de California, 1893-1900". México : Centro de Estudios Mexicanos y Centroamericanos de la Embajada de Francia en México : Instituto Nacional Indigenista, 1991.(Léon Diguet; Jean A Meyer).
