= Xylosma kaalaensis =

Conservation status
- Vulnerable (IUCN 2.3)

Scientific classification
- Kingdom: Plantae
- Clade: Tracheophytes
- Clade: Angiosperms
- Clade: Eudicots
- Clade: Rosids
- Order: Malpighiales
- Family: Salicaceae
- Genus: Xylosma
- Species: X. kaalaensis

Binomial name
- Xylosma kaalaensis Sleumer

Species of flowering plant

Xylosma kaalaensis is a species of flowering plant in the family Salicaceae. It is endemic to New Caledonia.
