= Xylosma ruiziana =

Conservation status
- Data Deficient (IUCN 2.3)

Scientific classification
- Kingdom: Plantae
- Clade: Tracheophytes
- Clade: Angiosperms
- Clade: Eudicots
- Clade: Rosids
- Order: Malpighiales
- Family: Salicaceae
- Genus: Xylosma
- Species: X. ruiziana

Binomial name
- Xylosma ruiziana Sleumer

Species of plant

Xylosma ruiziana is a species of flowering plant in the family Salicaceae. It is endemic to Peru.
