= Xylosma tuberculata =

Conservation status
- Endangered (IUCN 3.1)

Scientific classification
- Kingdom: Plantae
- Clade: Tracheophytes
- Clade: Angiosperms
- Clade: Eudicots
- Clade: Rosids
- Order: Malpighiales
- Family: Salicaceae
- Genus: Xylosma
- Species: X. tuberculata

Binomial name
- Xylosma tuberculata Sleumer

Species of flowering plant

Xylosma tuberculata is a species of flowering plant in the family Salicaceae. It is endemic to New Caledonia.
