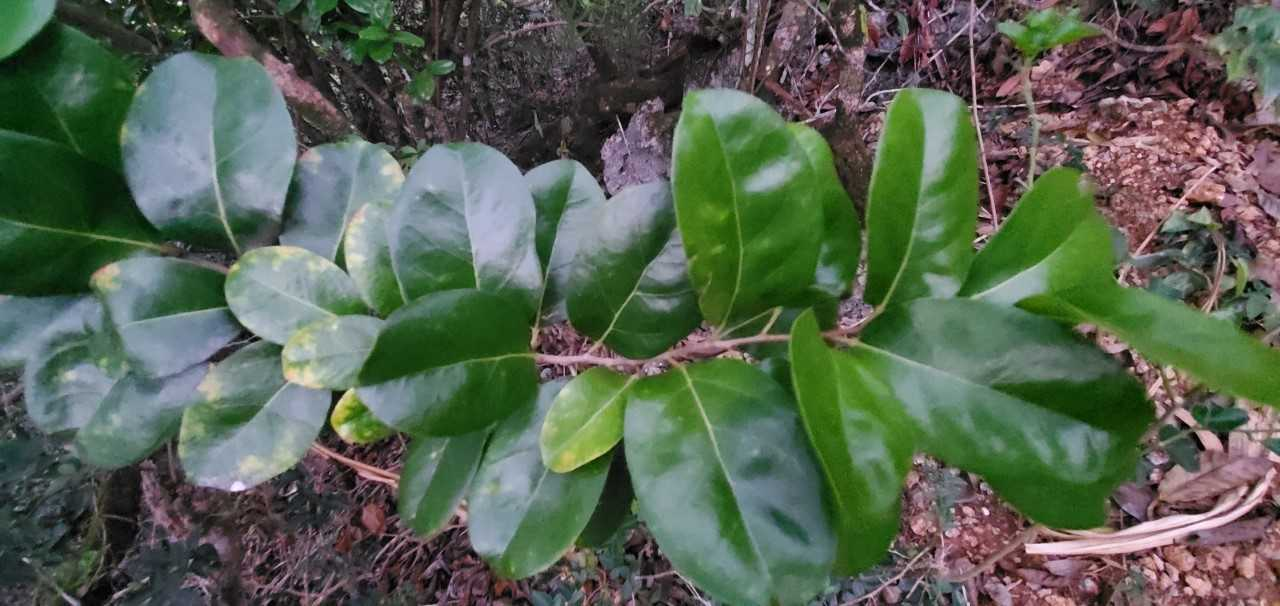
- The glossy, entire leaves of Xylosma nelsonii.

Scientific classification
- Kingdom: Plantae
- Clade: Embryophytes
- Clade: Tracheophytes
- Clade: Angiosperms
- Clade: Eudicots
- Clade: Rosids
- Order: Malpighiales
- Family: Salicaceae
- Genus: Xylosma
- Species: X. nelsonii

Binomial name
- Xylosma nelsonii Merr.

Synonyms (Note: The synonymy of Xylosma nelsonii remains mildly contested across different sources, with only disputes over its taxonomic classification rooted in historical misattributions posing enduring confusion.)
- List: Flacourtia integrifolia Merr.

= Xylosma nelsonii =

Species of flowering plant

Xylosma nelsonii is a species of flowering plant in the family Salicaceae, endemically distributed throughout Micronesia.

== Description ==
Xylosma nelsonii is a small, unarmed, dioecious tree that is nearly glabrous apart from its inflorescences. Its branches are smooth and become wrinkled when dry, exhibiting a brownish or grayish hue with subtle slow-cellate patterning. The alternate, elliptic leaves are thin and papery, typically 5–8 cm (2.0–3.1 in) long and 2.5–5 cm (0.98–1.97 in) wide, with entire margins that may be slightly recurved or bear faint glandular teeth at vein tips. They are broadly rounded at the apex—occasionally slightly notched—and taper to a subacute or rounded base, each leaf featuring two distinct glands near the petiole insertion. When dry, the upper leaf surface appears brownish-olive and glossy, while the lower is paler but still shining. The venation consists of 5–6 slender, distant lateral veins per side, which anastomose into a fine reticulate pattern. Petioles are about 5 mm (0.20 in) long and may be faintly puberulent. Male flowers are arranged in short axillary racemes or solitary fascicles, each raceme bearing a few flowers and measuring 1–1.5 cm (0.39–0.59 in) in length. Pedicels are long and measure 5–7 mm (0.20–0.28 in), jointed at the base of 1 mm (0.039 in) flower-bearing branches, each accompanied by a small ovate bract. The flowers have four imbricate, sparsely pubescent sepals which measure 2–3 mm (0.079–0.118 in) long and 1.5–2 mm (0.059–0.079 in), with filaments 1–2 mm (0.039–0.079 in) in length and broadly elliptic-ovoid anthers about 0.8–1 mm (0.031–0.039 in) long.

== Distribution ==
Xylosma nelsonii has a rather small extent, isolated to the Oceanian subregion of Micronesia. Within its span, it is exclusively found in Guam, the Federated States of Micronesia, and the Northern Mariana Islands.

== Ecology ==
Xylosma nelsonii is a plant of the wet tropical biome, found at estimated elevations ranging 2–175 m (6 ft 7 in – 574 ft 2 in) above sea level.

== Taxonomy ==
Xylosma nelsonii was first described by Elmer Drew Merrill in 1914 as Flacourtia integrifolia, and was later reassigned by Merrill himself in 1919 to its current name. Later, the genus underwent a grammatical gender concordance, initiated by William T. Stearn in 1992 when he questioned the genus's gender, and finalized by Dan Henry Nicolson in 1994, although Xylosma nelsonii was not subject to it because its epithet is a genitive noun, which remains unchanged regardless of gender. The collective number of synonyms across different sources is approximately 1.

Historically, Xylosma nelsonii was placed in Flacourtiaceae under older classification systems such as those of Cronquist and Takhtajan. Eventually, Flacourtiaceae, including this taxon, were reclassified into Salicaceae, a placement adopted by the APG III system and subsequently recognized by Plants of the World Online, though this classification remains disputed.

=== Etymology ===
The genus name Xylosma derives from xylon (Ancient Greek: ξύλον), meaning "wood" or "tree," and osmé (Ancient Greek: ὀσμή), meaning "smell," overall referring to the aromatic wood found in some species. The species epithet, nelsonii, is likely in honor of Edward William Nelson.
