= Xylosma nepalensis =

Xylosma nepalensis Temporal range: Miocene–Pliocene

Scientific classification
- Kingdom: Plantae
- Clade: Tracheophytes
- Clade: Angiosperms
- Clade: Eudicots
- Clade: Rosids
- Order: Malpighiales
- Family: Salicaceae
- Genus: Xylosma
- Species: †X. nepalensis

Binomial name
- †Xylosma nepalensis Prasad & Pandey

Extinct species of flowering plant

Xylosma nepalensis is an extinct species of flowering plant in the family Salicaceae, excavated from the Sivalik Hills within western Nepal, with an estimated temporal range spanning the Miocene to the Pliocene. It was first described by Mahesh Prasad and Shivendra Mohan Pandey in 2008.

== Description ==
Known only from a single leaf specimen, Xylosma nepalensis had leaves that measured roughly 2.8 cm (1.1 in) long and 1.2 cm (0.47 in) wide; the shape was elliptic, the apex and base were both obtuse, and the margins were serrate. The leaf surface was chartaceous, and the veins came in pairs that formed a eucamptodromous pattern. The leaves of Xylosma nepalensis reportedly bore a close resemblance to the extant Xylosma congesta.

== Taxonomy and discovery ==
In 2008, many fossil specimens were recovered from sites across the Sivalik Hills, where Mahesh Prasad and Shivendra Mohan Pandey identified Xylosma nepalensis as a new species based solely on a leaf impression. This taxon is only known from one specimen obtained from the Bankas Formation along the Surai Khola, a 19 km (12 mi) river running through the southern Sivalik belt.

=== Etymology ===
The generic name Xylosma derives from xylon (Ancient Greek: ξύλον), meaning "wood" or "tree", and osmé (Ancient Greek: ὀσμή), meaning "smell", overall referring to the aromatic wood found in some extant species. The specific epithet, nepalensis, is in reference to Nepal, where the fossil locality, Surai Khola, is located.
