= Xylosma obovata =

Conservation status
- Vulnerable (IUCN 3.1)

Scientific classification
- Kingdom: Plantae
- Clade: Tracheophytes
- Clade: Angiosperms
- Clade: Eudicots
- Clade: Rosids
- Order: Malpighiales
- Family: Salicaceae
- Genus: Xylosma
- Species: X. obovata

Binomial name
- Xylosma obovata (H.Karst.) Triana & Planch.

Synonyms
- Craepaloprumnon obovatum H.Karst.; Myroxylon obovatum (H.Karst.) Warb.

Species of flowering plant

Xylosma obovata is a species of flowering plant in the family Salicaceae. It is endemic to Colombia.
