= Xylosma eoapactis =

Xylosma eoapactis Temporal range: Eocene

Scientific classification
- Kingdom: Plantae
- Clade: Tracheophytes
- Clade: Angiosperms
- Clade: Eudicots
- Clade: Rosids
- Order: Malpighiales
- Family: Salicaceae
- Genus: Xylosma
- Species: †X. eoapactis

Binomial name
- †Xylosma eoapactis Huzioka & Takahasi

Extinct species of flowering plant

Xylosma eoapactis is an extinct species of flowering plant in the family Salicaceae, excavated from two sites in Yamaguchi Prefecture, with an estimated temporal range spanning the Eocene. It was first described by Kazuo Huzioka and Eitaro Takahasi in 1970.

== Description ==
Known only from leaf specimens, Xylosma eoapactis had leaves that measured up to 4.5 cm (1.8 in) long and 3.2 cm (1.3 in) wide; the shape was triangular or ovate, the apex was acute, the base was subacute, rounded, or cordate, and the margins were serrulate. The leaf surface was coriaceous, and the veins came in pairs that formed a reticulate pattern; the petiole was short, about 4 mm (0.16 in) long. The leaves of Xylosma eoapactis reportedly bore a close resemblance to the extant Xylosma congesta.

== Taxonomy and discovery ==
In 1970, numerous fossil specimens were recovered from Japan’s Okinoyama Formation, where Kazuo Huzioka and Eitaro Takahasi identified Xylosma eoapactis as a new species based solely on fossilized leaves. This taxon is only known from four specimens obtained from two sites: Kami-Umeda and Fujimagari, both located in Ube, a city in Yamaguchi Prefecture.

=== Etymology ===
The generic name Xylosma derives from xylon (Ancient Greek: ξύλον), meaning "wood" or "tree", and osmé (Ancient Greek: ὀσμή), meaning "smell", overall referring to the aromatic wood found in some species. The specific epithet, eoapactis, combines the prefix eo-, which refers to the Eocene epoch, and apactis, which is a reference to Apactis, a defunct genus that has been synonymized with Xylosma.
