= Xylosma fawcettii =

Conservation status
- Near Threatened (IUCN 2.3)

Scientific classification
- Kingdom: Plantae
- Clade: Tracheophytes
- Clade: Angiosperms
- Clade: Eudicots
- Clade: Rosids
- Order: Malpighiales
- Family: Salicaceae
- Genus: Xylosma
- Species: X. fawcettii

Binomial name
- Xylosma fawcettii Urb.

Species of flowering plant

Xylosma fawcettii is a species of flowering plant in the family Salicaceae. It is endemic to Jamaica.
