= Diahot River =

Coordinates: 20°19′28″S 164°19′40″E

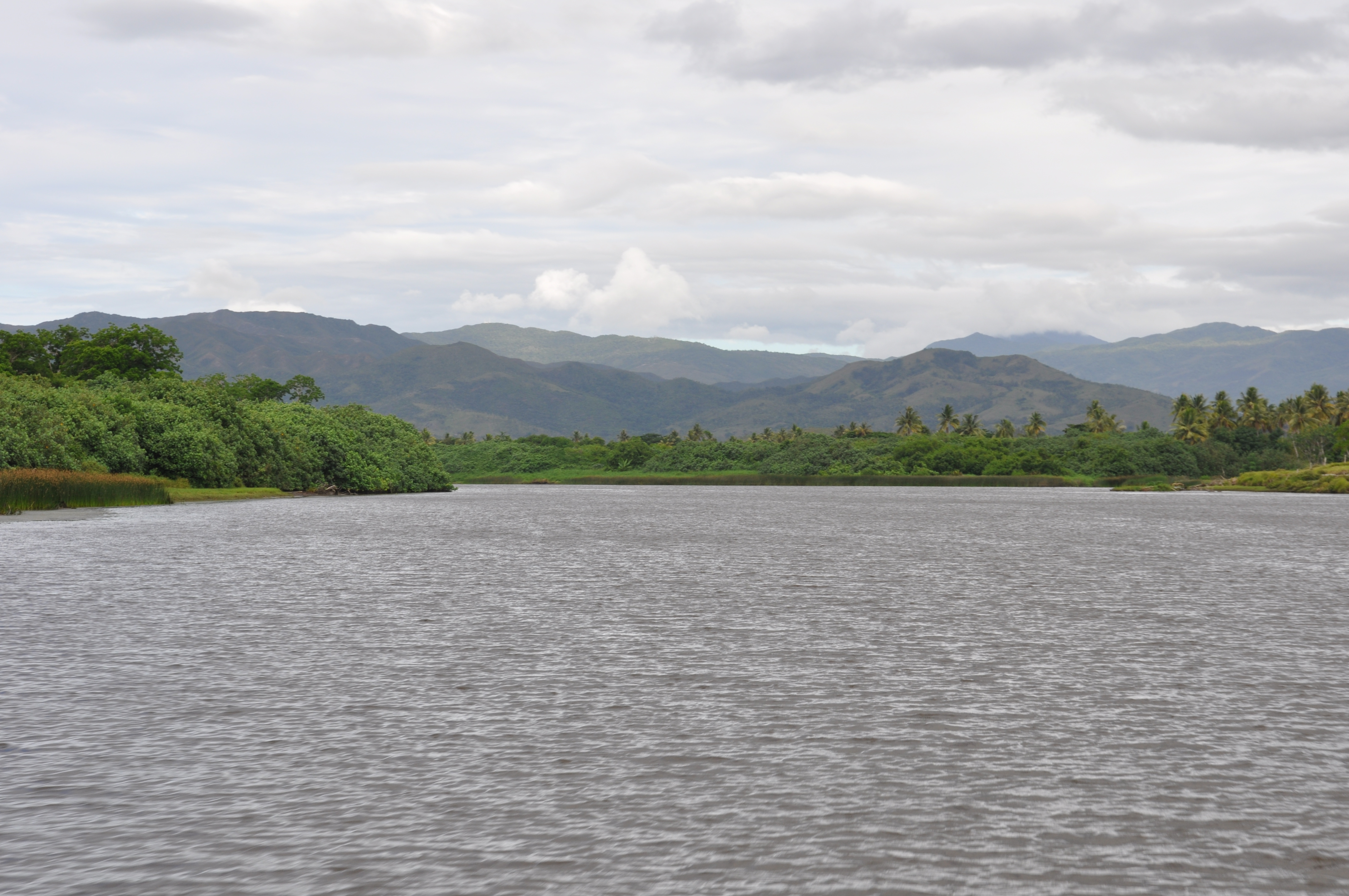
- Diahot river downstream Ouégoa

Location
- Country: New Caledonia

Physical characteristics
- Mouth
  - location: Pacific Ocean
- Discharge
  - average: 4 m^{3}/s (140 cu ft/s)

Diahot is the longest river of New Caledonia, flowing for some 60 mi (97 km). It has a catchment area of 620 km^{2} (240 mi^{2}) and opens north-westward into the Baie d'Harcourt, flowing towards the northern point of the island along the western escarpment of the Mont Panié. The village of Ouégoa lies on the river, not far from the mouth. The Diahot flows into the sea between the villages of Bwalayet and Pam, just south of Ile de Pam. It carries a substantial load of fine-grained sediment, which has increased over time due to felling and burning of forest and woodland vegetation and the introduction of grazing, creating soil erosion in the river system.

== Hydrology ==
=== General characteristics ===
Diahot has been monitored during a 43-year period between 1955 and 2008. The mouth is very influenced by tide so discharge is measured at Bondé Sainte Anne. At this place the basin area is 248 km^{2} (96 mi^{2}).
Average discharge at this place is 4 m^{3}.s^{−1}. Because of daily flows variability and strong influence of flood events on average values, this quantity is very representative of what is commonly observed in streams. We, therefore, prefer the term median flow to characterize the normal flow of watercourses.
Median daily flow characterizes the flow value exceeded on average one day on two. Its value on Diahot is 2.3 m^{3}.s^{−1}.

Diahot has seasonal flow variations strongly marked with floods during the wet season (December–April) and a large peak of 11 m^{3}.s^{−1} in March.

Low water occur during the dry season (July to November) in summer (July to September), resulting in a decrease in average monthly flow to 1.1 m^{3}.s^{−1} in September. Diahot watershed receives an average annual water blade precipitated of 1,097 mm (43.2 in) while the runoff depth is 796 mm (31.3 in). The interannual mean runoff coefficient is 50%.

=== Extreme values ===
The annual flood discharge rises to 500 m^{3}.s^{−1} and 10-year flood to 1906 m^{3}.s^{−1}.
The hundred-year flood is between 3375 m^{3}.s^{−1} and 5400 m^{3}.s^{−1} according to the assessments of flood maxima observed.
The maximum flood was observed during the tropical depression on February 6, 1972. Its flow was then measured at 3720 m^{3}.s^{−1}.
The small size of Caledonian watershed gives them a very important responsiveness to hazards. Concentration time that reflects duration between the maximum rain episode with the corresponding maximum throughput is only 4:25 for Diahot.

Values of low water can be very little with a median "low water characteristic discharge" 0.59 m^{3}.s^{−1} and Centennial dry "low water characteristic discharge" 0.2 m^{3}.s^{−1}.

== Annexes ==
=== Bibliography ===
- Renaud ALRIC, Recueil des débits caractéristiques de la Nouvelle-Calédonie, DAVAR, Nouméa, 2009
