= Karl Wilhelm Leopold Krug =

German businessman, naturalist, ethnographer, and diplomat

- Born: January 7, 1833; Mühlenbeck, Kingdom of Prussia
- Died: April 4, 1898 (aged 65); Berlin, German Empire
- Scientific career
- Author abbrev. (botany): Krug

Karl (or Carl) Wilhelm Leopold Krug (January 7, 1833 – April 4, 1898) was a German businessman, naturalist, ethnographer, diplomat and supporter of scientific collections. While he lived in Puerto Rico he was involved in plant and insect collecting.

== Early life and education ==
Born on the estate of Mühlenbeck in the vicinity of Berlin on January 7, 1833, he was educated by private tutors and in several schools (gymnasia), obtaining his matriculation certificate in 1854.

== Puerto Rico ==
After a short apprenticeship in Bremen, Krug arrived in Puerto Rico in 1857 and started work in the international trading company of Lahmayer & Co. (later Schulze & Co.) in Mayaguez, Puerto Rico. He became partner, and later sole owner of the company. He became vice-consul in Mayaguez of both Germany and Great Britain.

Under the influence of his legal advisor Don Domingo Bello y Espinoza, Krug became an avid collector of plants and insects. He underwrote several collecting expeditions by the zoologist Juan Gundlach. These collecting activities resulted in a large amount of scientific material, which became part of the Zoological Museum and Ethnographic Museum in Berlin.

== Berlin ==
Krug retired from his business activities in 1876. He worked from then on in close collaboration with Ignatz Urban, the director of the Berlin Botanical Garden. Krug and (to some extent the Berlin Academy of Sciences) underwrote the collecting expeditions of Paul Sintenis and of the baron Eggers, at the time commanding officer of the Danish forces on St. Thomas. These, together with his own extensive material and other acquisitions became the basis of the Herbarium Krug et Urban, which was destroyed in the Second World War.

He died of congestive heart failure in Groß-Lichterfelde on April 4, 1898.

== Legacy ==
The plant genera Krugia Urb. (Myrtaceae) and Krugiodendron Urb. (Rhamnaceae) were named in his honor.

A species of Puerto Rican lizard, Anolis krugi W. Peters, 1876, is named in his honor.

== Sources ==
- Urban, Ignatz (1898). Leopold Krug. Berlin: Gebrüder Borntraeger. (in German).
- Wunschmann, Ernst (1906). "Krug, Leopold". In: Allgemeine Deutsche Biographie (ADB), Volume 51. Leipzig: Duncker & Humblot. pp. 401–403. (in German).
