= André Guillaumin =

French botanist

- Born: 21 June 1885; Arrou
- Died: 29 May 1974 (aged 88); Athis-Mons
- Scientific career
- Fields: Botany; natural sciences
- Institutions: Muséum national d'histoire naturelle
- Author abbrev. (botany): Guillaumin

André Louis Joseph Edmond Armand Guillaumin (21 June 1885 in Arrou – 29 May 1974 in Athis-Mons) was a French botanist.

He obtained his license in biology in 1906 and began work in the Muséum national d'histoire naturelle in Paris in 1909 as a preparer. He obtained a doctorate in biological science in 1910 and became assistant to the chair of botany and plant physiology. In 1932 he succeeded Désiré Georges Jean Marie Bois (1856-1946) as head of the department of horticulture at the museum. He became the deputy director of the museum from 1947 to 1950, retiring in 1956.

His work includes the investigation on the parts associated with Oxalidaceae, Rutaceae, Burseraceae, Hamamelidaceae, Haloragaceae, Callitrichaceae, Rhizophoraceae, Mehistomaceae and Crypteroniaceae in Flore générale de l'Indo-Chine (Flowers of Indo-China; 1910, 1911, 1912, 1920, 1921), Arbres et arbrisseaux utiles ou ornementaux (Useful and Ornamental Trees and Shrubs; 1928) and Les Fleurs de jardins (The Flowers for Gardens; 4 volumes, 1929 to 1936). In 1928 he published a posthumous book by Léon Diguet, Les Cactacées utiles du Mexique (Useful Cacti of Mexico).

Despite limited resources, Guillaumin made significant contributions to the museum, and was the creator of several gardens, including the winter, or alpine garden.

== See also ==
- List of Chairs of the Muséum national d'histoire naturelle
