= Dan Henry Nicolson =

- Born: September 5, 1933; Kansas City, Missouri
- Died: June 2, 2016 (aged 82); Mitchellville, Maryland
- Education: Stanford Business School, Cornell University
- Scientific career
- Fields: Botany
- Workplaces: Smithsonian Institution
- Thesis: A taxonomic revision of the genus Aglaonema (Araceae) (1964)

Dan Henry Nicolson (1933–2016) was a botanist known particularly for his work on the Araceae, and for his contributions to botanical nomenclature. He is honoured by the International Association for Plant Taxonomy with the Dan Nicolson Fund, set up to provide a research grant each year.

He graduated from Grinnell College and published his first paper on the milkweeds of Iowa with his botany teacher in 1955. He went to Stanford University and received an MBA degree in 1957, working as assistant in the Dudley Herbarium. Dan worked with George Lawrence in the Bailey Hortorium of Cornell University and earned an MS degree in 1959 and a PhD in 1964.

He worked as a research botanist in the Smithsonian Institution's National Museum of Natural History from 1964 until his retirement in 2007.
