= Hermann Otto Sleumer =

Dutch botanist

- Born: 21 February 1906; Saarbrücken, Germany
- Died: 1 October 1993 (aged 87); Oegstgeest, Netherlands
- Known for: Taxonomic research; botanical author abbreviation Sleumer
- Scientific career
- Fields: Botany

Hermann Otto Sleumer (February 21, 1906 in Saarbrücken – October 1, 1993 in Oegstgeest) was a Dutch botanist of German birth. The plant genera Sleumerodendron Virot (Proteaceae) and Sleumeria Utteridge, Nagam. & Teo (Icacinaceae), are named for him.

The standard author abbreviation Sleumer is used to indicate this person as the author when citing a botanical name.
