= Dactylispa doriae =

Scientific classification
- Kingdom: Animalia
- Phylum: Arthropoda
- Class: Insecta
- Order: Coleoptera
- Suborder: Polyphaga
- Infraorder: Cucujiformia
- Family: Chrysomelidae
- Genus: Dactylispa
- Species: D. doriae

Binomial name
- Dactylispa doriae (Gestro, 1890)

Synonyms
- Hispa doriae Gestro, 1890; Dicladispa doriae

Species of beetle

Dactylispa doriae is a species of beetle of the family Chrysomelidae. It is found in Bangladesh, China (Yunnan), India (Assam, Karnataka, Sikkim, West Bengal), Indonesia, Laos, Myanmar, Nepal, Thailand and Vietnam.

== Life history ==
The recorded host plants for this species are Setaria, Xylosma and Quercus species.

== Taxonomy ==
It is sometimes listed as a synonym of Dactylispa albopilosa, but this is based on misidentifications.
