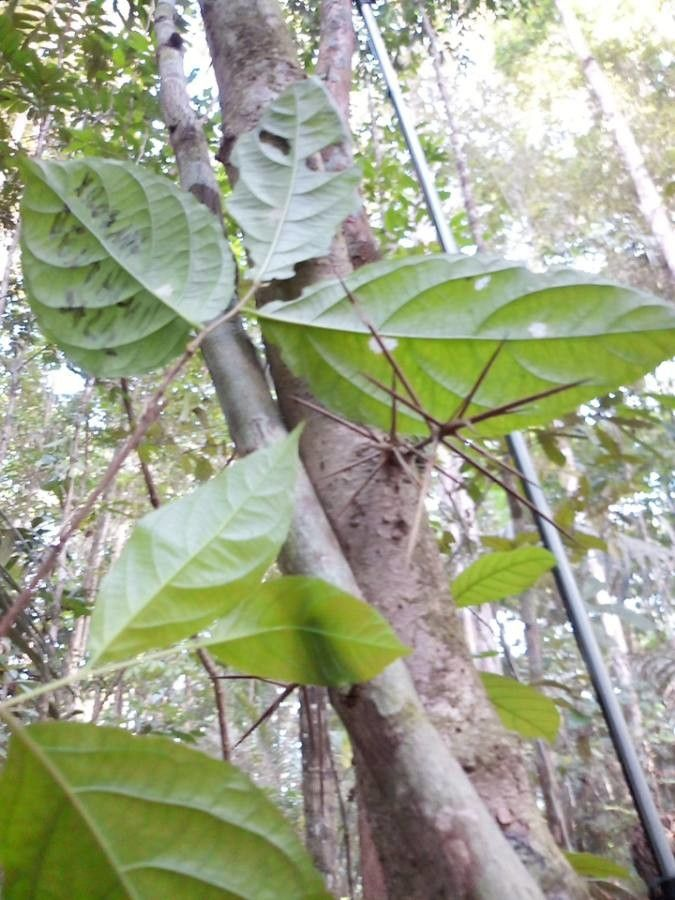
- The leaves and spiny trunk of Xylosma benthamii.

Conservation status
- Least Concern (IUCN 3.1)

Scientific classification
- Kingdom: Plantae
- Clade: Embryophytes
- Clade: Tracheophytes
- Clade: Angiosperms
- Clade: Eudicots
- Clade: Rosids
- Order: Malpighiales
- Family: Salicaceae
- Genus: Xylosma
- Species: X. benthamii

Binomial name
- Xylosma benthamii (Tul.) Triana & Planch.

Synonyms (Note: The synonymy of Xylosma benthamii remains contested across different sources, with major orthographic errata and authorial discrepancies posing enduring confusion rooted in historical misattributions. A concerted effort will be made to ensure comprehensive coverage of all possible synonyms.)
- List: Flacourtia benthami Tul.; Flacourtia benthamii Tul.; Flacourtia benthamii (Griseb.) Tul.; Flacourtia digyna Benth.; Flacourtia digyna Benth. ex Eichler; Flacourtia nitida Benth.; Flacourtia prunifolia Benth.; Flacurtia benthami Tul.; Flacurtia prunifolia Benth.; Hisingera benthami Clos; Hisingera benthamii (Tul.) Clos; Hisingera lucens Clos; Myroxylon benthamii Kuntze; Myroxylon benthamii (Tul.) Kuntze; Myroxylon digynum Kuntze; Myroxylon digynum (Eichler) Kuntze; Myroxylon digynum (Benth.) Kuntze; Myroxylon digynum (Benth. ex Eichler) Kuntze; Myroxylon lucens Kuntze; Myroxylon lucens (Clos) Kuntze; Xylosma armata J.F.Macbr.; Xylosma armatum J.F.Macbr.; Xylosma benthami Triana & Planch.; Xylosma benthamii Griseb.; Xylosma benthamii (Tul.) Griseb.; Xylosma digyna Eichler; Xylosma digynum Eichler; Xylosma digynum Benth. ex Eichler; Xylosma pallidifolia Sleumer ex Steyerm. & O.Huber; Xylosma pallidifolium Sleumer; Xylosma pallidifolium Sleumer ex Steyerm. & O.Huber; Xylosma pilosa J.F.Macbr.; Xylosma pilosum J.F.Macbr.

= Xylosma benthamii =

Species of flowering plant

Xylosma benthamii, colloquially known as rompejato, is a species of flowering plant in the family Salicaceae, endemic across South America.

== Description ==
Xylosma benthamii is a shrub or tree ranging from 2–15 m (6 ft 7 in – 49 ft 3 in) in height. Its trunk is typically armed with stout, branched, dark-colored spines up to 10 cm (3.9 in) long, although some descriptions note unarmed, smooth branches with slightly tuberculate bark. Younger branchlets may be puberulous or glabrous, while older stems develop dense lenticels and grayish corky bark. The foliage is variable but generally sparse and elliptic to sublanceolate, sometimes oblong or ovate, measuring 5–12 cm (2.0–4.7 in) in length and 3–6 cm (1.2–2.4 in) in width. Leaves are usually acuminate or shortly attenuate at the apex and attenuate at the base, with finely glandular-serrate margins bearing minute teeth; they are typically glabrous, though may show limited pubescence on the midrib beneath. Basal glands may be obvious, faint, or absent, and the petiole is short, around 3–6 mm (0.12–0.24 in) long. Venation includes 5–6 pairs of lateral nerves with slightly raised transverse veins and veinlets on both surfaces. Axillary buds are solitary, ovate-rounded, and densely pubescent.

The species bears unisexual flowers, primarily male, in small axillary clusters of 4–10 per fascicle or short raceme, emerging from foliate or defoliate axils. These are supported on slender, short pedicels that measure 2–4 mm (0.079–0.157 in), which are puberulent or minutely pubescent. The calyx has 4–5 ovate sepals with ciliolate margins; the sepals are glabrous outside but sometimes tomentose within. There is no corolla, and the floral disc is thick and glabrous, lobed, and often formed from coalescing glands aligned with the sepals. Male flowers contain 15–30 stamen with slender glabrous filaments and minute, ovate-rounded, basifixed anther that dehisce longitudinally. Female flowers, when present, exhibit a glabrous ovoid ovary with a short style and two divergent stigmas that are thickened below and dilated distally. The fruit is subglobose, ripening from cherry-red to blackish, measuring 4–6 mm (0.16–0.24 in) in diameter, and contains 2–4 ovoid-subtrigonous seeds, each about 2–4 mm (0.079–0.157 in) long.

== Distribution ==
Xylosma benthamii is endemic to a wide range of countries, including Bolivia, Brazil, Colombia, Ecuador, French Guiana, Guyana, Peru, Suriname, and Venezuela. In Colombia, it has been recorded in Amazonas, Antioquia, Caldas, Cauca, Chocó, Nariño, and Valle del Cauca. Venezuelan occurrences span Apure, Bogotá, Bolívar, Falcón, Guárico, Lara, Miranda, Monagas, and Portuguesa. In Bolivia, it is native to Beni and Santa Cruz, while in Brazil, its distribution extends from the northern states of Roraima, Pará, Amazonas, and Acre to Maranhão and Bahia in the northeast, Mato Grosso do Sul in the central-west region, and Minas Gerais in the southeast. Though not explicitly stated to be introduced outside of its native range, it has been preserved in Indonesia.

== Ecology ==
Xylosma benthamii is primarily a species of the wet tropical biome, inhabiting tropical and subtropical moist broadleaf forests across Andean and predominantly Amazonian regions. Its elevational range spans approximately 90–2,290 m (300–7,510 ft), with records extending into lowland and montane forests, gallery forests, and forest edges transitioning into savanna and the Cerrado. In Ecuador's wetland, it is particularly well adapted to seasonally flooded fringes of dry forest, forming part of transitional woody communities alongside Haematoxylum campechianum. These hydrologically dynamic habitats reflect the species’ ecological plasticity, allowing it to persist in flood-prone margins increasingly impacted by agricultural encroachment. In some dry forest communities, its dominance is notable, comprising up to 25% of the relative importance value, signaling a robust role in ecosystem structure and resilience.

== Taxonomy ==
Xylosma benthamii was first described by George Bentham in 1845 under the name Flacourtia prunifolia. In 1847, Edmond Tulasne reassigned the species as Flacurtia benthami, likely an erratum, later standardized to Flacourtia benthamii. The taxonomic placement shifted once more in 1862 when José Jerónimo Triana and Jules Émile Planchon transferred the species to the genus Xylosma, publishing it as Xylosma benthami, a name eventually corrected to the now-accepted Xylosma benthamii. Later, the genus underwent a grammatical gender concordance, initiated by William T. Stearn in 1992 when he questioned the genus's gender, and finalized by Dan Henry Nicolson in 1994, although Xylosma benthamii was not subject to it because its epithet is a genitive noun, which remains unchanged regardless of gender. The collective number of synonyms across different sources is approximately 33.

Historically, Xylosma benthamii was placed in Flacourtiaceae under older classification systems such as those of Cronquist and Takhtajan. Eventually, Flacourtiaceae, including this taxon, were reclassified into Salicaceae, a placement adopted by the APG III system and subsequently recognized by Plants of the World Online, though this classification remains disputed.

=== Etymology ===
Within its range, the plant goes by only a few common names, those being espinho-de-judeu, pustameira, and rompejato.

The generic name Xylosma derives from xylon (Ancient Greek: ξύλον), meaning "wood" or "tree," and osmé (Ancient Greek: ὀσμή), meaning "smell," overall referring to the aromatic wood found in some species. The specific epithet benthamii is in honor of George Bentham, who authored Flacourtia prunifolia.

== Phytotherapy ==
Phytochemical and pharmacological analyses of Xylosma benthamii support its traditional use in treating wounds and gastrointestinal disorders. Ethanol extracts from the plant's leaves, stems, and roots revealed a rich profile of bioactive compounds, including flavonoids, tannins, terpenoids, alkaloids, saponin, coumarins, and steroids. Among these, the leaf extract exhibited the highest flavonoid content, quantified at 175.22 ± 0.89 mg (2.7041 ± 0.0137 gr) of rutin equivalents per gram. Toxicity assays using Artemia salina indicated that the leaf extract was non-toxic, while the root extract showed moderate toxicity. Additionally, the root extract demonstrated modest antioxidant activity, with a free radical scavenging capacity of 22.6%.

== Conservation status ==
Xylosma benthamii has a broad geographic distribution and robust population size, as documented by the Amazon Tree Diversity Network. The species is well-represented across its range and shows no evidence of significant population decline. Moreover, it is not presently facing any major threats, nor have any substantial risks been projected for the foreseeable future. This stability in both population dynamics and habitat security underpins its favorable conservation status. As a result, the species is classified as Least Concern by the IUCN Red List.
