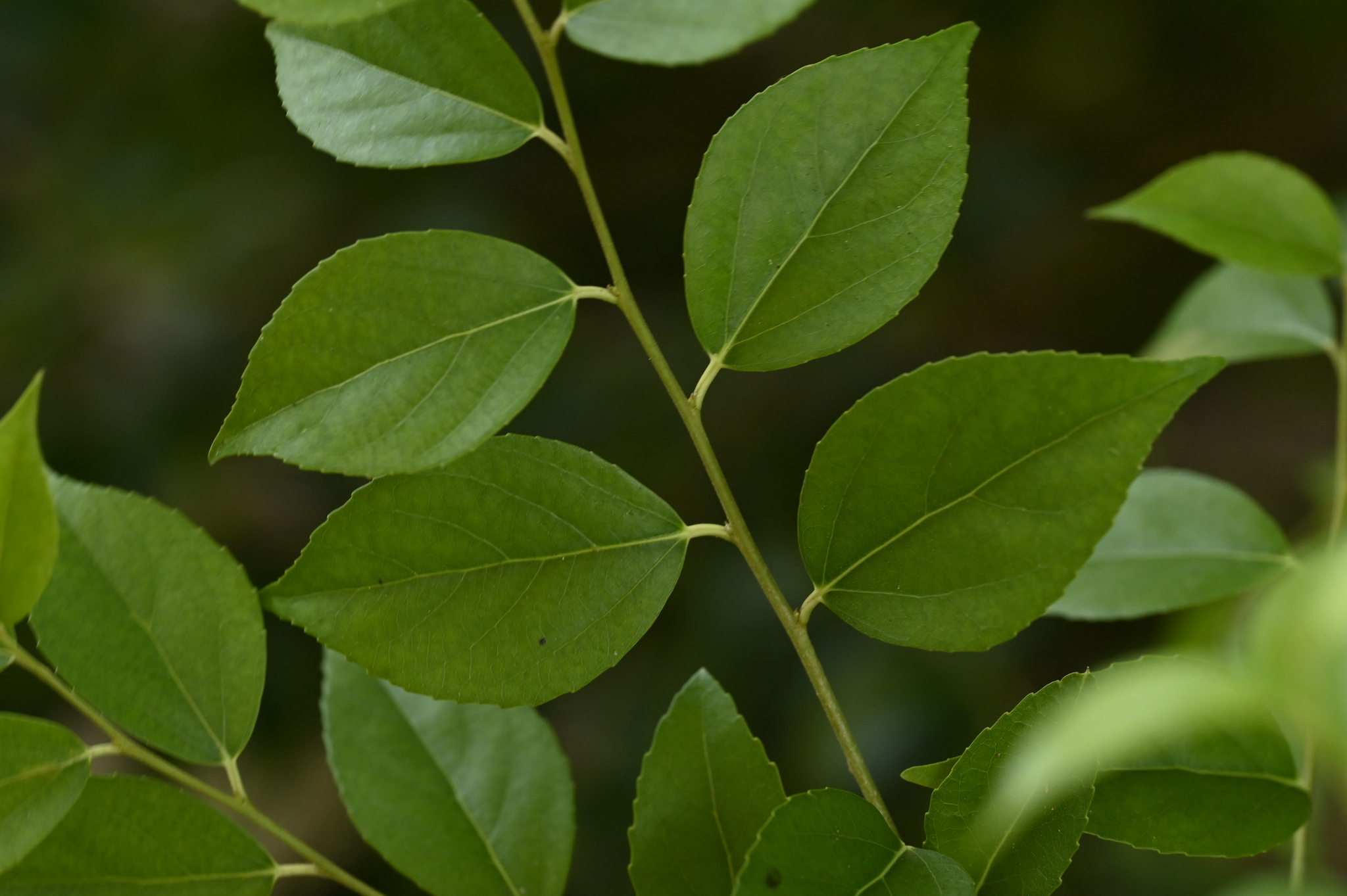

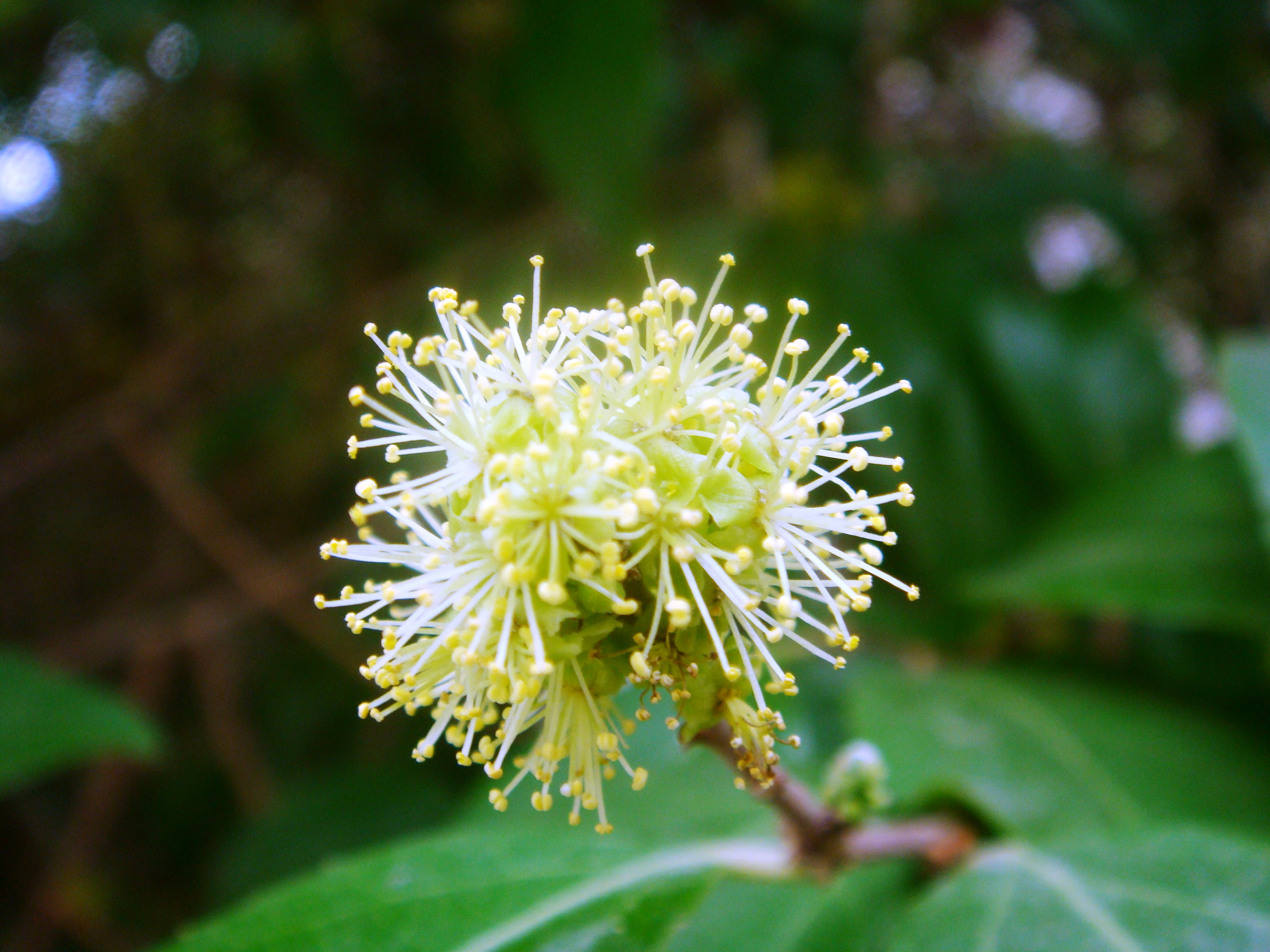
- Leaves and flowers of Xylosma congesta

Conservation status
- Least Concern (IUCN 3.1)

Scientific classification
- Kingdom: Plantae
- Clade: Tracheophytes
- Clade: Angiosperms
- Clade: Eudicots
- Clade: Rosids
- Order: Malpighiales
- Family: Salicaceae
- Genus: Xylosma
- Species: X. congesta

Binomial name
- Xylosma congesta (Lour.) Merr.

Synonyms
- 21 synonyms: Apactis japonica Thunb.; Casearia subrhombea Hance; Crataegus academiae H.Lév.; Croton congestus Lour.; Flacourtia chinensis Clos; Flacourtia japonica Walp.; Flacourtia racemosa Siebold & Zucc.; Hisingera japonica Siebold & Zucc.; Hisingera racemosa Siebold & Zucc.; Kurkas congestum (Lour.) Raf.; Myroxylon japonicum (Thunb.) Makino; Myroxylon racemosum (Siebold & Zucc.) Kuntze; Xylosma apactis Koidz.; Xylosma congesta var. caudata S.S.Lai; Xylosma congesta var. pubescens (Rehder & E.H.Wilson) Chun; Xylosma japonica (Walp.) A.Gray; Xylosma japonica var. pubescens (Rehder & E.H.Wilson) C.Y.Chang; Xylosma racemosa (Siebold & Zucc.) Miq.; Xylosma racemosa var. caudata (S.S.Lai) S.S.Lai; Xylosma racemosa var. glaucescens Franch.; Xylosma racemosa var. pubescens Rehder & E.H.Wilson

= Xylosma congesta =

Shiny xylosma

Species of flowering plant

Xylosma congesta, commonly known as shiny xylosma, is a species of flowering plant in the family Salicaceae, native to East Asia. Originally described in 1790 as Croton congestus, the species was later reassigned to Xylosma in 1919. The plant is widely grown ornamentally for its dense growth habit and shiny foliage, but its introduction to the United States as a result has led to its emergence as a potential invasive species. Other common names include dense logwood and zuo mu (Chinese: 柞木).

== Description ==
=== Habit, bark, and thorns ===
Xylosma congesta is an evergreen shrub or tree that grows up to 15 m (49 ft) tall, typically up to 3.7 m (12 ft) when cultivated. As a shrub, the plant exhibits a distinctly dense, many-branched growth habit. The crown shape varies from rouded to vase-like, and can measure up to 4.5 m (15 ft) wide. The bark is brownish-gray and can have a furrowed, scaly, or smooth texture. The trunk typically bears thorns, while young branches bear spines that are lost with age.

=== Leaves ===
The leaves are glossy, leathery, alternate, and broadly ovate to elliptic, measuring 3–8 cm (1.2–3.1 in) long and 2.5–3.5 cm (0.98–1.38 in) wide, with serrate margins; their tips are acute or acuminate, and the bases are typically obtuse or rounded, but occasionally acute. New leaves emerge a bronze color before transitioning to green as they age. The petioles are short, reaching up to 5 mm (0.20 in) in length, and are either glabrous or densely pubescent. Both the adaxial (top) and abaxial (bottom) surfaces are glabrous, but may be sparsely pubescent along the veins.

=== Flowers ===
Xylosma congesta is dioecious, meaning it produces staminate (male) and pistillate (female) flowers on separate individuals. Regardless of sex, the flowers are small, inconspicuous, and cream to yellowish, typically appearing from July to November. Male flowers bear long filaments about 3 mm (0.12 in) in length, topped with minute, ellipsoid anthers that measure 0.2 mm (0.0079 in) long. Female flowers contain an ovoid ovary about 4.5 mm (0.18 in) long and two minute styles that are joined along their basal half and are either nearly absent or measure up to 0.5 mm (0.020 in) long.

Each flower has 4–6 broadly ovate sepals, which measure 1–2 mm (0.039–0.079 in) long and have rounded to orbicular tips. They are sparsely pubescent externally, glabrous internally, and ciliate along the margins. The bracts are ovate to narrowly lanceolate, with ciliate margins and a pubescent abaxial surface. The inflorescences are axillary, and may either appear as dense fascicles or as short racemes that reach up to 2 cm (0.79 in) long.

=== Fruits ===
The fruits, produced from August to December, are small, globose berries that measure 4–5 mm (0.16–0.20 in) in diameter and range in color from dark red to black. The sepals, styles, and disc remain persistent until the fruits fall. Within each fruit are 2–3 ovoid seeds, enclosed in a membranous, dark-streaked testa and flattened on one side by mutual compression; when dried, the seeds are reddish-brown.

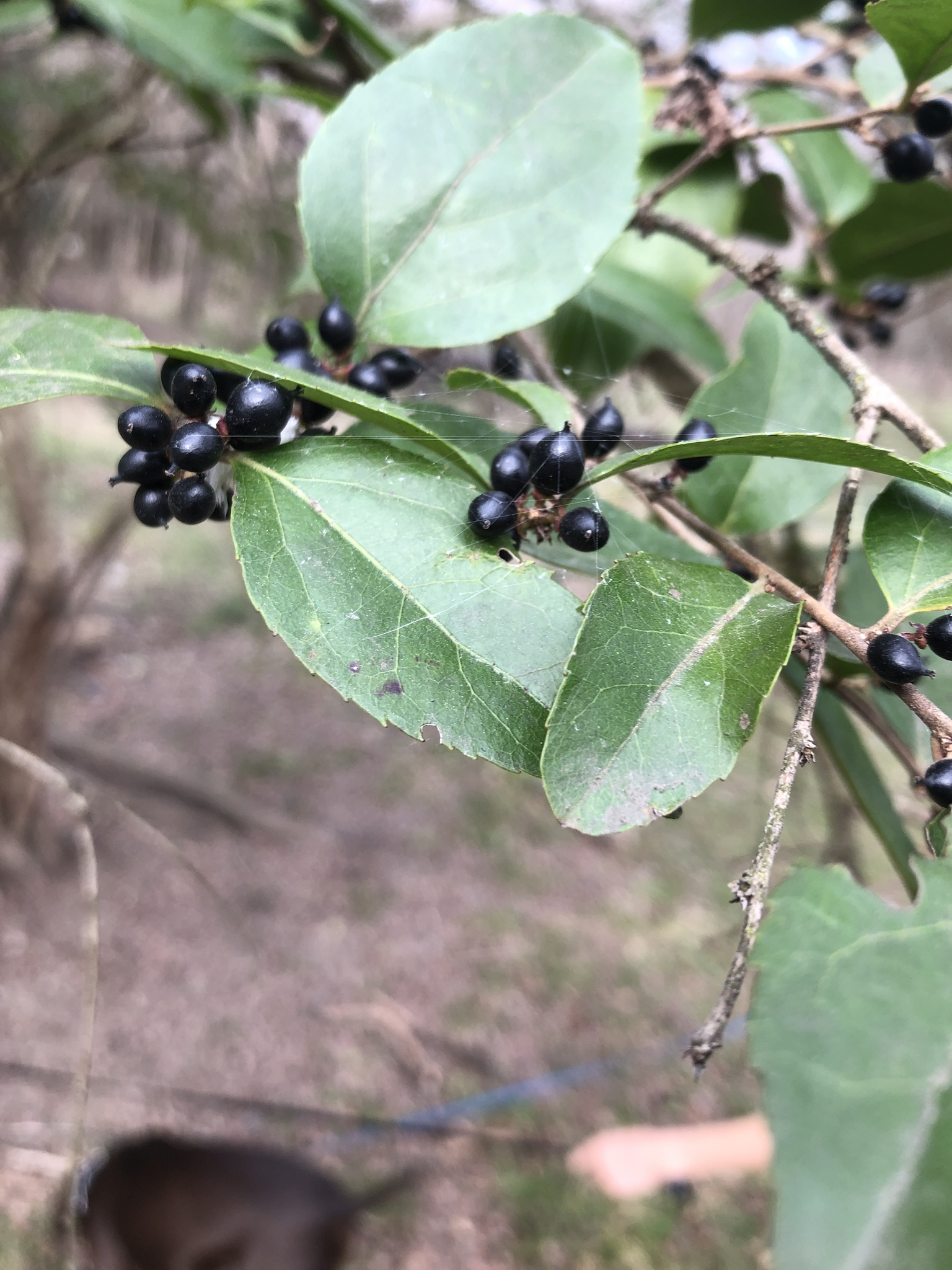
Fruits

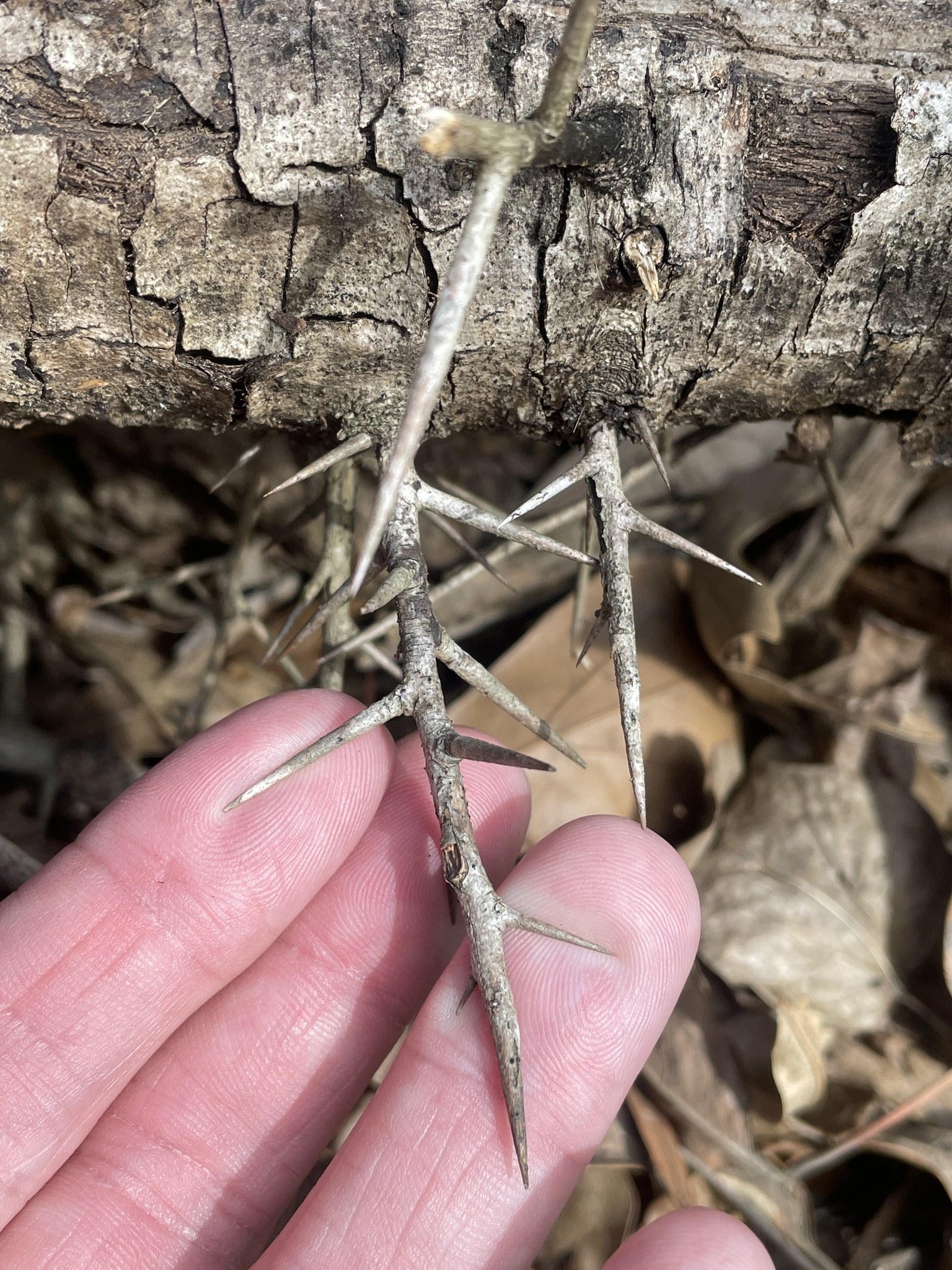
Branched thorns

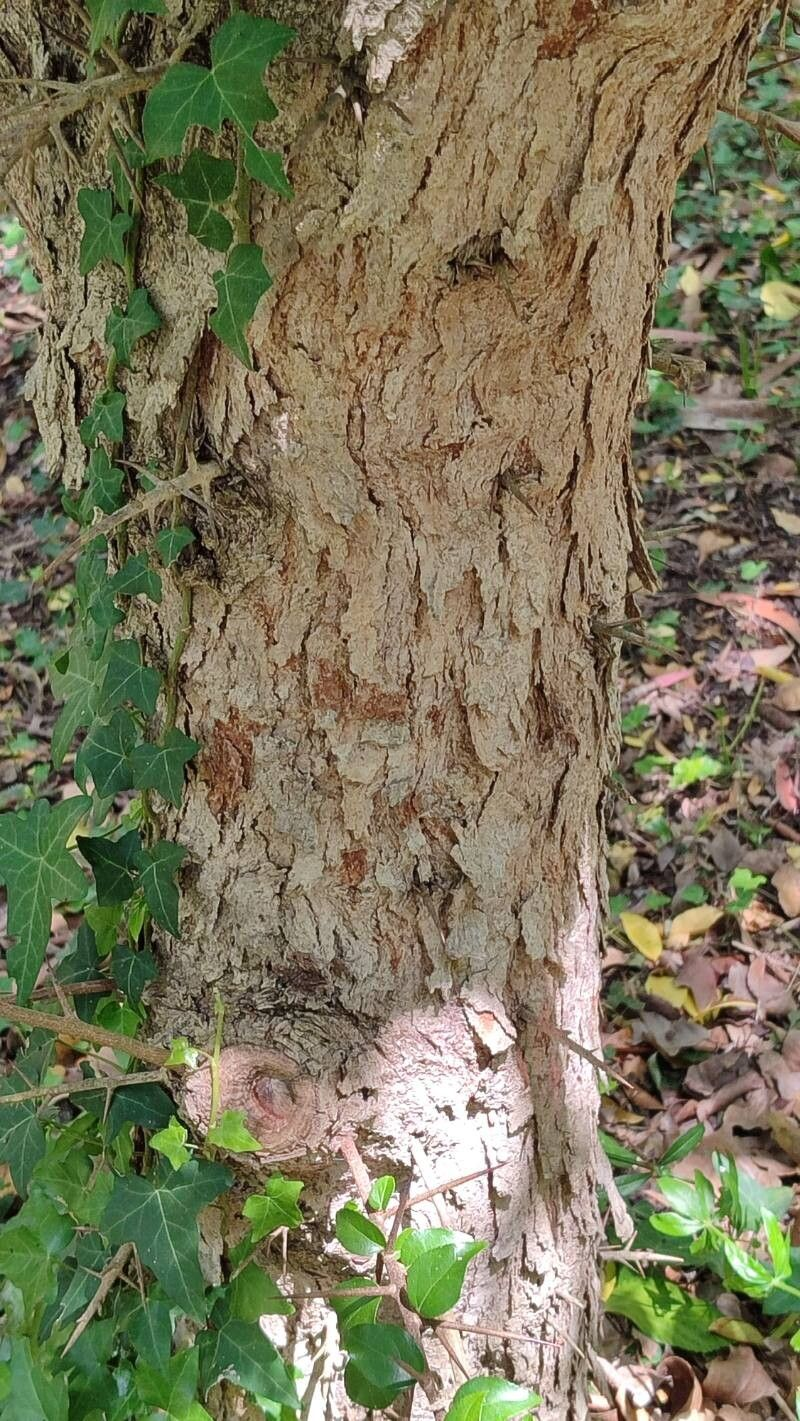
Bark

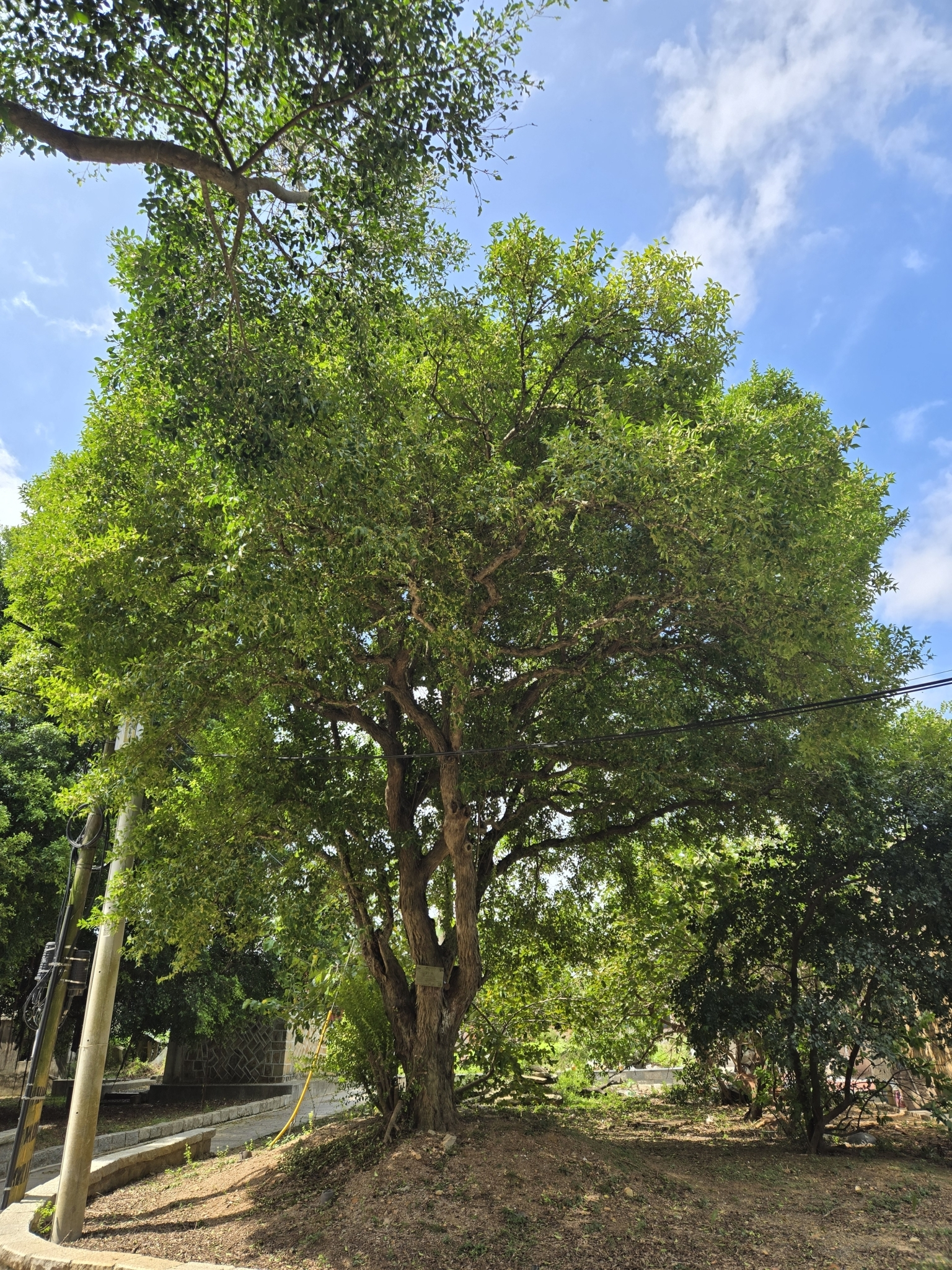
Tree

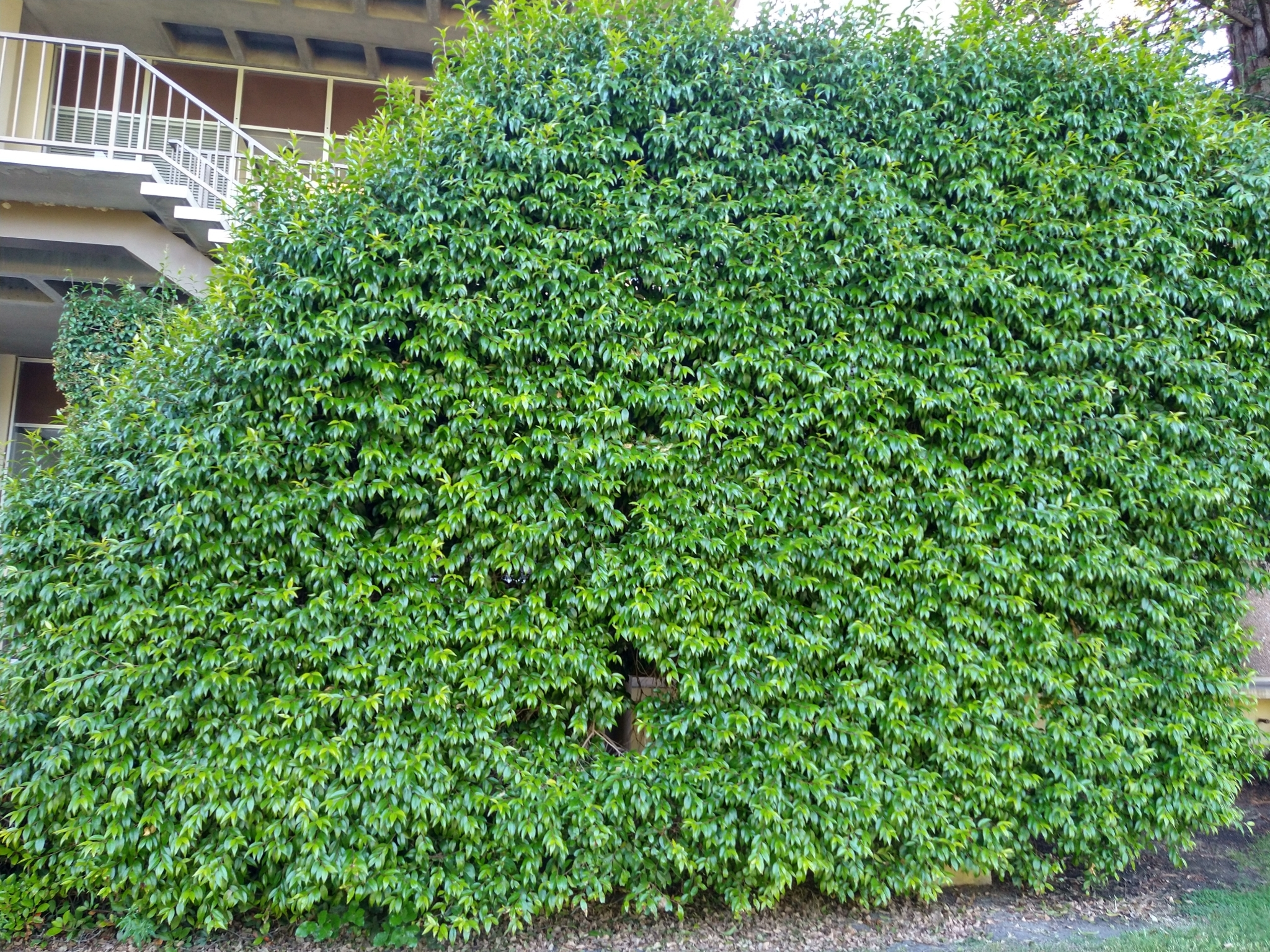
Ornamental shrub

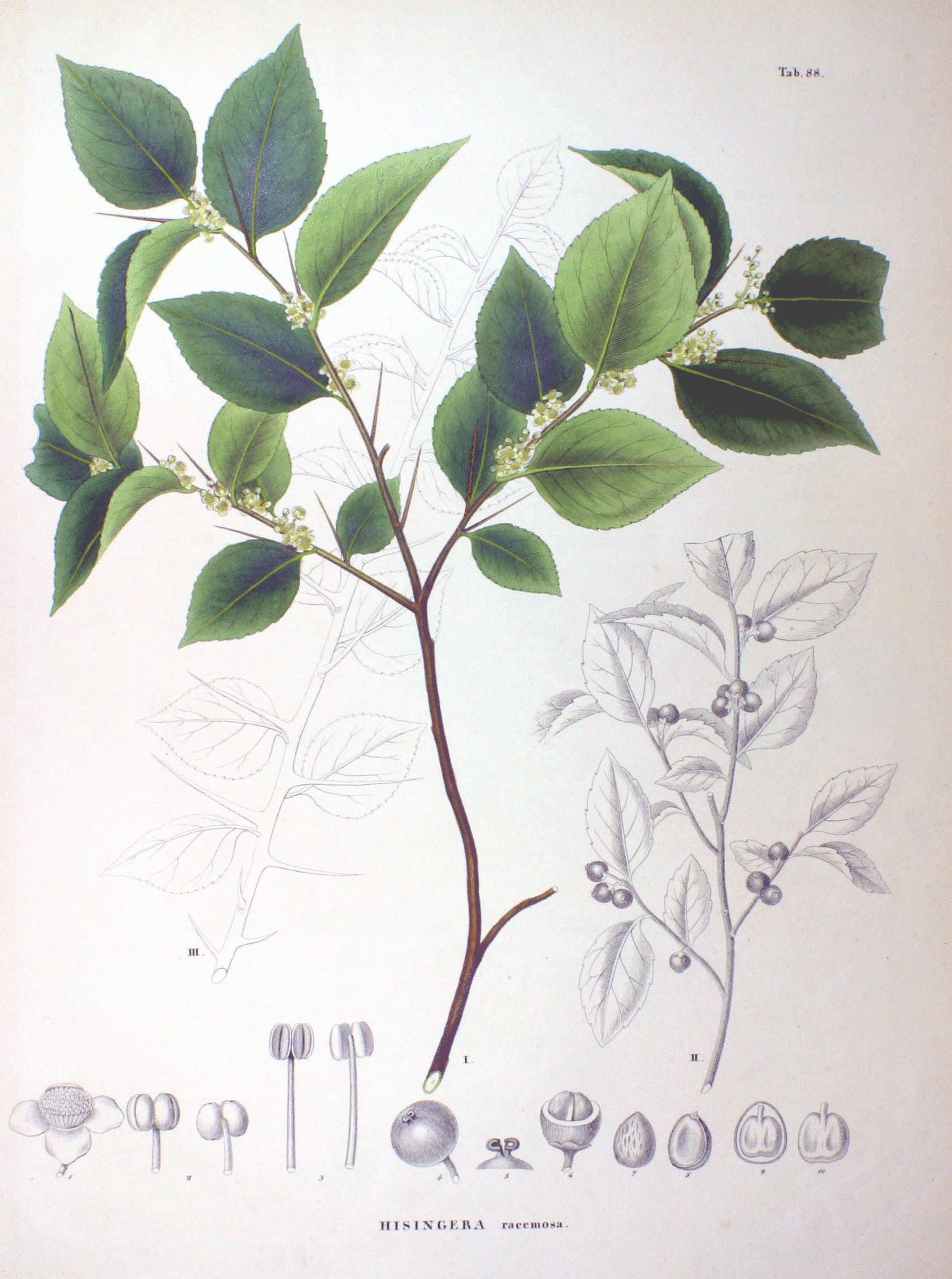
Botanical illustration

== Distribution and habitat ==
Xylosma congesta is native to East Asia, where it is present in China, Japan, Korea, and Taiwan. In China, its range is mainly concentrated in the southeast, stretching from Yunnan to Jiangsu, and as far north as Gansu. In Korea, the species is found chiefly in the south, which goes for its presence in Japan as well. Smaller populations of the plant have been reported from Tibet and in northern India, where it is said to be rare.

Outside of its native range, Xylosma congesta has been introduced to the United States, primarily in the states of California, Florida, and Texas. In these areas, the plant is not inherently invasive, (Note: Contrarily, the plant is reported to be invasive in the bayous of Texas for its damaging effects on the environment, according to the Bayou Preservation Association (BPA).) but it does exhibit traits that are typical of invasives, such as shade-tolerance, bird-dispersed seeds, the ability to grow in a variety of soil conditions, and being able to recover after repeated top-kill.

In its native habitat, Xylosma congesta inhabits subtropical and temperate regions at elevations of up to 1,100 m (3,600 ft), where it grows in montane forests, hilly thickets, plains, forest margins, and around villages.

== Ecology ==
In its native range, Xylosma congesta serves as a host plant for several insects, including, but not limited to, the Chinese oak tussar moth (Antheraea pernyi) and two species of chalcid wasps, Microterys rufofulvus and Psyllaephagus syntomozae.

== Taxonomy ==
Xylosma congesta was first described by João de Loureiro in 1790 under the name Croton congestus, but it was later reassigned to Xylosma in 1919 by Elmer Drew Merrill, who concluded that the taxon did not conform to Croton, nor Euphorbiaceae, and that Loureiro had included a fruit description that did not correspond to the specimen he described, likely in an attempt to put the name in agreement with Croton.

When Xylosma congesta was first named in 1919, the genus was treated with the neuter (sexless) gender, so its specific epithet (species name) was congestum at the time. Later on, however, taxonomists disputed the gender of the genus until the issue was officially resolved in the Shenzhen Code of 2018, which states in Article 62 that genus names ending in -osma are feminine in gender, rather than neuter.

Xylosma congesta is commonly cited as a synonym of Xylosma racemosa, but this treatment is not accepted by Plants of the World Online because Xylosma congesta has priority over the latter name. (Note: Despite this, several databases still regard Xylosma congesta as a synonym, including the Global Biodiversity Information Facility, Catalogue of Life, and Encyclopedia of Life.) The species Xylosma senticosa is often treated as a synonym of Xylosma congesta based on the assumption that their morphological differences are insufficient to separate them, but this treatment is also not recognized by Plants of the World Online.

=== Etymology ===
The genus name Xylosma means "aromatic wood," as it derives from xylon (Ancient Greek: ξύλον), meaning "wood," and osmé (Ancient Greek: ὀσμή), meaning "smell," in reference to the fragrant wood of some Pacific species within the genus. The specific epithet "congesta" means "crowded together," denoting the plant's dense growth habit.

== Uses ==
=== Cultivation ===
Xylosma congesta is commonly grown as an ornamental plant for its dense growth habit and shiny foliage, most often as a screen or hedge, but also in the form of espalier or topiary. The plant can be cultivated in hardiness zones 8–11, and grows easily in evenly moist, well-drained soil. It can become drought-tolerant once it matures, making it suitable for xeriscaping; regular watering, however, results in healthier growth.

The plant's popularity has declined due to its tendency to spread beyond planting areas, as well as its susceptibility to pests and fungi. Among its most problematic pests is the giant whitefly (Aleurodicus dugesii), which is known to regularly infest and damage the foliage. Other pests include glassy-winged sharpshooters, shot-hole borers, spider mites, and thrips. The species is also susceptible to fungal infections, particularly Armillaria root rot.

=== Herbal medicine ===
Xylosma congesta has a long history of medicinal use in traditional Chinese medicine, with its first documented applications dating back to the 16th century. Traditionally, both the leaves and bark are used: the bark is often burned to ash, while the leaves are applied as poultices, both being used as birthing aids and for their anti-inflammatory properties.

Examination of leaf extracts from Xylosma congesta has shown anti-melanogenic, anti-wrinkle, anti-inflammatory, and antioxidant activity, supporting further evaluation for use in functional supplements or cosmetics aimed at skin whitening, wrinkle reduction, and managing inflammatory responses.

== Conservation status ==
Xylosma congesta is believed to have a large population size and shows no evidence of significant declines nor any major threats to its conservation; as a result, the species has a conservation status of least concern on the IUCN Red List.
