= Bennettiodendron leprosipes =

Conservation status
- Least Concern (IUCN 3.1)

Scientific classification
- Kingdom: Plantae
- Clade: Tracheophytes
- Clade: Angiosperms
- Clade: Eudicots
- Clade: Rosids
- Order: Malpighiales
- Family: Salicaceae
- Genus: Bennettiodendron
- Species: B. leprosipes

Binomial name
- Bennettiodendron leprosipes (Clos) Merr.

Synonyms
- List: Bennettia horsfieldii Miq.; Bennettia leprosipes (Clos) Koord.; Bennettia longipes Oliv.; Bennettiodendron brevipes Merr.; Bennettiodendron brevipes var. brevipes; Bennettiodendron brevipes var. margopatense S.S.Lai; Bennettiodendron brevipes var. shangsiense (X.X.Chen & J.Y.Luo) S.S.Lai; Bennettiodendron lanceolatum H.L.Li; Bennettiodendron leprosipes var. ellipticum (C.Y.Wu) S.S.Lai; Bennettiodendron leprosipes var. leprosipes; Bennettiodendron leprosipes var. pilosum G.S.Fan & Y.C.Hsu; Bennettiodendron leprosipes var. rugosifolium S.S.Lai; Bennettiodendron leprosipes var. stenophyllum S.S.Lai; Bennettiodendron longipes (Oliv.) Merr.; Bennettiodendron macrophyllum C.Y.Wu ex S.S.Lai; Bennettiodendron macrophyllum var. macrophyllum; Bennettiodendron macrophyllum var. obovatum S.S.Lai; Bennettiodendron macrophyllum var. pilosum (G.S.Fan & Y.C.Hsu) S.S.Lai; Bennettiodendron shangsiense X.X.Chen & J.Y.Luo; Bennettiodendron simaoense G.S.Fan; Bennettiodendron subracemosum C.Y.Wu; Meliosma petiolaris Miq.; Myroxylon leprosipes (Clos) Kuntze; Xylosma leprosipes Clos

Species of flowering plant

Bennettiodendron leprosipes, transliterated as shān guì huā (Chinese: 山桂花), is a species of flowering plant in the family Salicaceae. It is the type species of its genus, Bennettiodendron.

The plant grows in evergreen broad-leaved forests at altitudes of 400–1,800 m (1,300–5,900 ft). It ranges from China in the regions of East, South Central, and the eastern tip of Southwestern China, to the islands of Sumatra and Java in Indonesia. It also exists in the countries of Bangladesh, Myanmar, Thailand, Vietnam, and India in Arunachal Pradesh, with a disjunct population in Chhattisgarh.

== Description ==
Bennettiodendron leprosipes grows as an evergreen shrub or small tree, standing between 2–6 m (6 ft 7 in – 19 ft 8 in) tall. Their bark is gray-brown, emitting a fetid odor, and does not flake. The branchlets are terete and densely gray-brown puberulous, becoming glabrescent or subglabrous with time. The petiole measures 0.3–6 cm (0.12–2.36 in), occasionally reaching 10 cm (3.9 in), brown puberulous, gradually becoming glabrescent, with or without 2 glands at the apex. The leaf blade is typically narrowly to broadly elliptic, elliptic-oblong, or obovate, usually 10–23 cm (3.9–9.1 in) by 4–7.5 cm (1.6–3.0 in), chartaceous or thinly so, both surfaces are glabrous, or puberulous along the veins abaxially, with very short spreading hairs. The midvein is raised on both sides, with 7–9 pairs of lateral veins including 1 or 2 pairs from the base. The base is usually acute-cuneate, less often obtuse-cuneate, rarely rounded; the margin is sparsely obtusely serrate, and the apex is obtuse, contracting quite abruptly to an acumen up to 2 cm (0.79 in) long. The terminal inflorescence is paniculate, measuring 6–12 cm (2.4–4.7 in) by approximately 4.5 cm (1.8 in), many-flowered (at least 20–30, usually more), initially densely brown puberulous, becoming glabrescent with age; the pistillate inflorescence rachises become pale brown or grayish and conspicuously densely pustular-lenticellate. The bracts and bracteoles are narrowly triangular, about 1 mm (0.039 in), and pubescent. The flowers are unisexual or apparently structurally bisexual, sordid-white or greenish yellow, and scented. Pedicels are 3–5 mm (0.12–0.20 in), extending to 1 cm (0.39 in) in fruit. Staminate flowers have broadly elliptic-ovate sepals measuring 3–3.5 mm (0.12–0.14 in), with thin texture, sparsely pubescent to nearly glabrous surfaces, and ciliate margins. The stamens are lightly exserted, light yellow, drying brown; filaments are 3–4 mm (0.12–0.16 in), pubescent with spreading hairs, white when dried, long; and anthers are oblong. The disk glands are purplish when fresh. Pistillate flowers have sepals similar to staminate flowers but approximately half as long; staminodes are many, resembling stamens but usually only half as long; disk glands are small, truncate, among the staminode bases. The ovary is yellowish green to orange in the fresh state, ovoid, somewhat collapsed, and coarsely wrinkled when dried, approximately 4 mm (0.16 in), with placentas that are 2-4-ovuled. Styles number 3 or 4, sordid-white when fresh, filiform, about 1 mm (0.039 in), glabrous; and stigmas measure approximately 0.3 mm (0.012 in). The berry is red when mature, drying black, globose, 6–9 mm (0.24–0.35 in) in diameter, with a thin, brittle pericarp when dry. Seeds are 1 or 2, globose (semiglobose when 2 are present), 3–4 mm (0.12–0.16 in) in diameter. The flowering period is from March to April, and the fruiting period is from May to November.

== Taxonomy ==
Bennettiodendron leprosipes was first described by Dominique Clos in 1857 as Xylosma leprosipes. In 1927, Elmer Drew Merrill reassigned the species to its current name. Over time, the species gained a list of synonyms, including 7 names formerly recognized as species of Bennettiodendron.

== Conservation status ==
Despite being listed as LC by the IUCN Red List, there are still threats to its habitat, including residential and commercial development, transportation, service corridors, agriculture, and aquaculture, which have been linked to a continuing decline in population. Though, it exists in at least one protected area, which ensures its preservation.
