= Xylosma tweediana =

- Fruits of Xylosma tweediana

Conservation status
- Least Concern (IUCN 3.1)

Scientific classification
- Kingdom: Plantae
- Clade: Tracheophytes
- Clade: Angiosperms
- Clade: Eudicots
- Clade: Rosids
- Order: Malpighiales
- Family: Salicaceae
- Genus: Xylosma
- Species: X. tweediana

Binomial name
- Xylosma tweediana (Clos) Eichler (Note: Plants of the World Online and World Flora Online both mistakenly cite Friedrich Eichlam, a German botanist, as the author for this taxon, when it was in fact August W. Eichler who named it, as can be seen in the original publication. The Global Biodiversity Information Facility, Catalogue of Life, and Encyclopedia of Life all provide the right authorship.)

Synonyms
- Hisingera tweediana Clos; Myroxylon tweedyanum (Clos) Kuntze; Myroxylon warburgii Briq.; Xylosma sleumeri Herter; Xylosma venosa var. populneum Sleumer ex Lombardo; Xylosma warburgii (Briq.) Briq.

Species of flowering plant

Xylosma tweediana is a species of flowering plant in the family Salicaceae, native to South America. Originally described in 1857 as Hisingera tweediana, the species was later reassigned to Xylosma in 1871. Xylosma tweediana is a common resident of gallery forests within the Atlantic Forest and Pampas biomes. Colloquial names include sucará, espina colorada, and espina corona.

== Description ==
=== Habit, trunk, and thorns ===
Xylosma tweediana is a deciduous, many-branched shrub or tree that can grow up to 8 m (26 ft) tall. The trunk is about 30 cm (12 in) wide and bears smooth, brownish bark and branched thorns. The branches are often reddish, lenticellate, and may be either armed (spiny) or unarmed; when armed, they bear simple (unbranched), axillary spines that number one per node and measure up to 5 cm (2.0 in) long.

=== Leaves ===
The leaves are simple, alternate, and range from slightly ovate to rhombic-elliptic in shape, measuring 3–4.5 cm (1.2–1.8 in) long and 1–3 cm (0.39–1.18 in) wide. Their tips are slightly acuminate to obtuse, the bases are attenuate or cuneate, and the margins are glandular and crenate or serrate. The leaves are periodically deciduous and emerge alongside the flowers, starting out with a membranous texture that becomes papery or leathery with age. The petioles are puberulous, somewhat flexuous, and measure up to 8 mm (0.31 in) long.

=== Flowers ===
Xylosma tweediana is dioecious, meaning it produces staminate (male) and pistillate (female) flowers on separate individuals. Its inflorescences are composed of dense fascicles that yield 3–10 flowers each, blooming from August to October. Male flowers bear 15–25 stamens with glabrous filaments up to 4 mm (0.16 in) long. Female flowers possess a glabrous, ovoid ovary, a short, sometimes deeply forked style, and 2–3 stigmas that are subcapitate (pin-like) to nearly reniform (kidney-shaped).

Each flower has 4–5 ovate, yellowish-white sepals, which measure 1.5–2 mm (0.059–0.079 in) long and feature subacute tips. They are minutely pubescent externally, densely pubescent to glabrescent internally, and densely ciliate along the margins. The corolla is absent.

=== Fruits ===
The fruits, produced from November to December, are subglobose to ovoid berries that are shiny, blackish-red, and measure up to 5 mm (0.20 in) in diameter. Within the fruits are 2–5 reddish, ovoid seeds which measure 2–3 mm (0.079–0.118 in) long, featuring a dense, fleshy aril and a smooth, reddish testa; inside, the endosperm is thin and creamy-whitish.

Spiny branch

Trunk

Tree

Female flowers

Male flowers

== Distribution and habitat ==
Xylosma tweediana is native to South America, where its distribution spans Brazil, Uruguay, and Argentina. In Brazil, it has been recorded from Minas Gerais south to Rio Grande do Sul; in Uruguay, it is found all throughout the country; and in Argentina, it is known from Entre Ríos north to Misiones.

Xylosma tweediana inhabits tropical and subtropical regions at low elevations, where it primarily grows in scrubland and gallery forests on sandy soil.

== Taxonomy ==
Xylosma tweediana was first described by Dominique Clos in 1857 under the name Hisingera tweediana, but it was later reassigned to Xylosma in 1871 by August W. Eichler, who deduced that it differed from Xylosma only in its smaller leaves and that the purported distinction in branch armature between male and female plants was not a consistent trait.

When Xylosma tweediana was first named in 1871, the genus was treated with the neuter (sexless) gender, so its specific epithet (species name) was tweedianum at the time. Later on, however, taxonomists disputed the gender of the genus until the issue was officially resolved in the Shenzhen Code of 2018, which states in Article 62 that genus names ending in -osma are feminine in gender, rather than neuter.

=== Etymology ===
The genus name Xylosma means "aromatic wood," as it derives from xylon (Ancient Greek: ξύλον), meaning "wood," and osmé (Ancient Greek: ὀσμή), meaning "smell," in reference to the fragrant wood of some Pacific species within the genus. The specific epithet "tweediana" is in honor of John Tweedie, a British botanist known for being one of the first to explore Spanish-occupied Argentina, which was notoriously hard to access at the time.

== Conservation status ==
Xylosma tweediana is believed to have a large population size and is not currently subject to any major threats to its conservation, nor have any potential future threats been identified; as a result, the species has a conservation status of least concern on the IUCN Red List.
