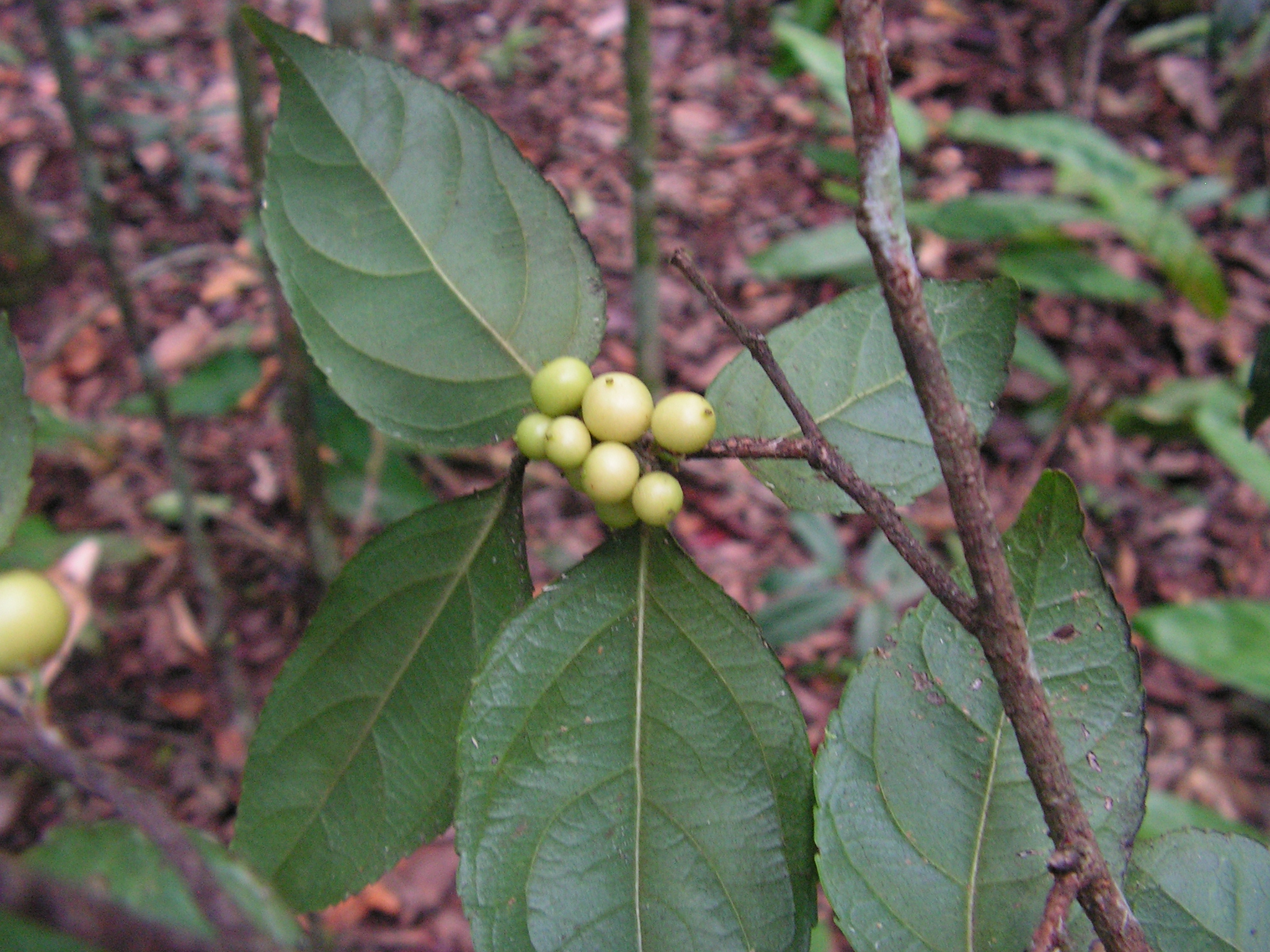
- The ciliate leaves and subglobose berries of Xylosma ciliatifolia.

Conservation status
- Least Concern (IUCN 3.1)

Scientific classification
- Kingdom: Plantae
- Clade: Tracheophytes
- Clade: Angiosperms
- Clade: Eudicots
- Clade: Rosids
- Order: Malpighiales
- Family: Salicaceae
- Genus: Xylosma
- Species: X. ciliatifolia

Binomial name
- Xylosma ciliatifolia (Clos) Eichler

Synonyms (Note: The synonymy of Xylosma ciliatifolia remains mildly contested across different sources, with only orthographic inconsistencies and authorial errata rooted in historical misattributions posing enduring confusion.)
- List: Hisingera ciliatifolia Clos; Myroxylon ciliatifolium (Clos) Kuntze; Xylosma ciliatifolium (Clos) Eichler; Xylosma pou-orfilae Herter; Xylosma pouorfilii Heiter; Xylosma velutinum auct.

= Xylosma ciliatifolia =

Species of flowering plant

Xylosma ciliatifolia, colloquially known as espinho-de-judeu, is a species of flowering plant in the family Salicaceae. It is native to South America.

== Description ==
Xylosma ciliatifolia is an understory semi-deciduous shrub or tree, typically reaching 8–12 m (26–39 ft) in height with a slender, erect trunk that is up to 20 cm (7.9 in) in diameter, densely set with strong, often branched spines up to 10 cm (3.9 in) long. Young stems and branchlets are ferrugineous-velvety or rusty-tomentose, later becoming glabrescent. The bark tends to be grey, and older branch parts bear scattered small leaves and flowers at spine bases. Leaves are elliptic to obovate-elliptic or ovate, 3–15 cm (1.2–5.9 in) long and 2–8 cm (0.79–3.15 in) wide, often varying greatly in shape and pubescence. They are initially thinly membranous and densely velutinous to hispidulous on both surfaces, especially along the nerves and ciliate margins, and become thin-coriaceous and glabrescent with age, typically retaining hairs along the midrib beneath. The apex is short-acuminate, with a cuneate to subacute base, and the margin is glandular-dentate to subserrate with 4–6 pairs of lateral nerves and a lax vein reticulation. Petioles are 4–15 mm (0.16–0.59 in) long and densely rusty-tomentulose.

The species is dioecious, producing 4–12 small 3–5 mm (0.12–0.20 in) long flowers per axillary fascicle, commonly arising from defoliate branchlets or young spine axils. Pedicels are slender, mid-articulated, 2–6 mm (0.079–0.236 in) long, and covered in rusty pubescence. There are 4–5 sepals, which are ovate, ciliate, and hispidulous on both surfaces with tiny apical glands. Male flowers bear 15–25 exserted, glabrous stamens; female flowers feature a glabrous ovoid ovary, a very short style, and 2–3 patent, nearly semi-orbicular stigmas. The floral disc is crenate with 6–12 discrete, glabrous glands. Fruits are small, measure 5–6 mm (0.20–0.24 in) in diameter, and are ovoid to subglobose berries, glabrous with persistent calyces. Each fruit typically contains 3–4 dark, shiny, trigonous-obovoid seeds that are approximately 4 mm (0.16 in) long, bearing two flat faces and a convex third. Notably, the tomentum of Xylosma ciliatifolia differs markedly from other American species, both in its texture and persistence.

== Distribution ==
Xylosma ciliatifolia is native to a broad region, with confirmed distribution across Venezuela—including Aragua, Miranda, and the Capital District—as well as Guyana, French Guiana, Bolivia, particularly in Santa Cruz, Paraguay in the Alto Paraná region, and Uruguay. In Brazil, the species occurs across multiple regions: in the Northeast, it is found in Maranhão, Ceará, and Pernambuco; in the Central-West, in Mato Grosso and Brasília; in the Southeast, it ranges from Caldas to the Lagoa area in Minas Gerais, and also in São Paulo and Rio de Janeiro; in the South, it occurs in Paraná, Santa Catarina, and Rio Grande do Sul.

== Ecology ==
Xylosma ciliatifolia occurs across a wide ecological range, growing in the seasonally dry tropical biome. It commonly occurs in diverse forest types, including dense primary rainforest and more open secondary formations. Its preferred habitats include gallery forests, swamp forests, and wooded savannahs such as the Cerrado, as well as semideciduous seasonal forests, the Caatinga, and coastal Restinga vegetation. In the southern extent of its distribution, it is also found in Araucaria forests. The species is frequently associated with riparian zones and thrives from lowland areas up to elevations of around 1,000 m (3,300 ft). Within these ecosystems, it tends to occupy the lower strata of mixed rainforests and is well-adapted to both humid and periodically dry conditions.

== Taxonomy ==
Xylosma ciliatifolia was first described by Dominique Clos in 1857 as Hisingera ciliatifolia, and was later reassigned by August W. Eichler in 1871 as Xylosma ciliatifolium. Later, the genus underwent a grammatical gender concordance, initiated by William T. Stearn in 1992 when he questioned the genus's gender, and finalized by Dan Henry Nicolson in 1994, putting Xylosma ciliatifolia in agreement with the genus name. The collective number of synonyms across different sources is approximately 6.

Historically, Xylosma ciliatifolia was placed in Flacourtiaceae under older classification systems such as those of Cronquist and Takhtajan. Eventually, Flacourtiaceae, including this taxon, were reclassified into Salicaceae, a placement adopted by the APG III system and subsequently recognized by Plants of the World Online, though this classification remains disputed.

=== Etymology ===
Due to its wide distribution, the plant goes by several common names. Such names include but are not limited to assucará, coroa de cristo', espinho-de-judeu, espinho-de-agulha, and sucará.

The generic name Xylosma derives from xylon (Ancient Greek: ξύλον), meaning "wood" or "tree", and osmé (Ancient Greek: ὀσμή), meaning "smell", overall referring to the aromatic wood found in some species. The specific epithet ciliatifolia stems from ciliatus, meaning "fringed with hairs", and folia, meaning "leaf".

== Phytotherapy ==
Xylosma ciliatifolia has shown promising antibacterial activity, particularly from its root bark. Ethanol and hexane extracts—especially hexane and chloroform fractions—demonstrated inhibitory effects against Staphylococcus aureus and Staphylococcus epidermidis in disk diffusion assays, with minimum inhibitory concentrations of 250 and 500 μg/mL (0.11 and 0.22 gr/imp fl oz). A bioactive sesquiterpenoid compound, ugandensidial, isolated from specimens collected in Curitiba, exhibited even greater potency, inhibiting bacterial growth at concentrations as low as 62.5 μg/mL (0.0274 gr/imp fl oz). Although traditionally the root bark is more commonly used, the leaves are also noted anecdotally for potential medicinal properties. The species is occasionally harvested from the wild for local therapeutic applications.

== Xylology ==
Xylosma ciliatifolia is a wood species, occasionally harvested from the wild for local use. Its wood is fine-textured, straight-grained, and moderately heavy, exhibiting notable hardness and durability. Despite these qualities, its utilization is typically limited to fuelwood and charcoal production rather than structural or artisanal applications.

== Horticulture ==
Xylosma ciliatifolia performs well across a range of light conditions, from full sun to fairly dense, dappled shade, and exhibits a notably fast growth rate during its juvenile stages. Propagation by seed is effective when sown promptly after ripening, ideally in a nursery seedbed with partial shade. Under such conditions, germination typically occurs within 15–30 days, with an expected success rate around 50%. Controlled trials suggest that alternating temperatures of 20–30 °C (68–86 °F) and a sand-based substrate optimize seedling development. Although detailed propagation protocols were previously lacking, recent findings confirm the species' resilience: seeds maintain viability for extended periods, especially under dry storage, and consistently germinate within seven days during the initial months.

== Conservation status ==
Xylosma ciliatifolia has a broad geographic range and a sizable population. It currently faces no significant threats, and none are anticipated in the foreseeable future. As a result, it is classified as Least Concern by the IUCN Red List, although many aspects of this assessment are absent and need expansion.
