= Bennettiodendron =

Scientific classification
- Kingdom: Plantae
- Clade: Tracheophytes
- Clade: Angiosperms
- Clade: Eudicots
- Clade: Rosids
- Order: Malpighiales
- Family: Salicaceae
- Subfamily: Salicoideae
- Tribe: Saliceae
- Genus: Bennettiodendron; Merr.

Type species
- Bennettiodendron leprosipes (Clos) Merr.

Species
- 2; see text

Synonyms
- Bennettia Miq.

Genus of flowering plants in the family Salicaceae

Bennettiodendron is a genus of flowering plants in the family Salicaceae.

The genus spans throughout Southeast Asia, as far north as central-eastern China, and as far south as Java, Indonesia. They grow as dioecious shrubs to small trees.

== Known species ==
The following species are accepted by Plants of the World Online:

- Bennettiodendron cordatum Merr.
- Bennettiodendron leprosipes (Clos) Merr.
