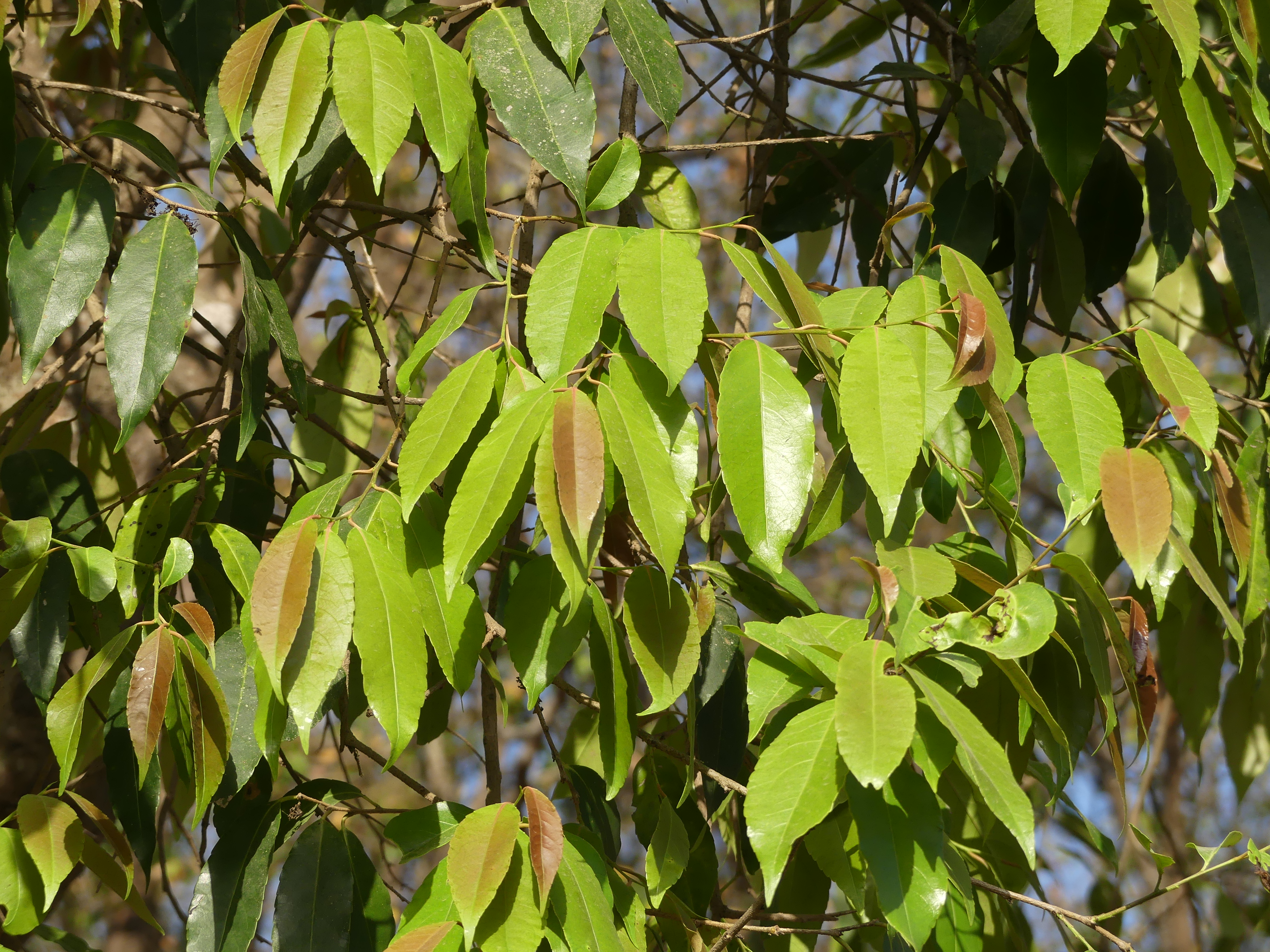
- The typically lanceolate leaves of Xylosma longifolia.

Conservation status
- Least Concern (IUCN 3.1)

Scientific classification
- Kingdom: Plantae
- Clade: Embryophytes
- Clade: Tracheophytes
- Clade: Spermatophytes
- Clade: Angiosperms
- Clade: Eudicots
- Clade: Rosids
- Order: Malpighiales
- Family: Salicaceae
- Genus: Xylosma
- Species: X. longifolia

Binomial name
- Xylosma longifolia Clos

Synonyms (Note: The synonymy of Xylosma longifolia remains contested across different sources, with orthographic inconsistencies and authorial errata rooted in historical misattributions posing enduring confusion.)
- List: Flacourtia cavaleriei H.Lév.; Flacourtia ferox Wall.; Flacourtia ferox Wall. ex Voigt; Myladenia serrata Airy Shaw; Myroxylon longifolium (Clos) Kuntze; Xylosma congesta var. kwangtungensis F.P.Metcalf; Xylosma congestum var. kwangtungense F.P.Metcalf; Xylosma dunniana H.Lév.; Xylosma fascicuflora S.S.Lai; Xylosma fasciculiflorum S.S.Lai; Xylosma longifolium Clos; Xylosma longifolium var. giangtungense; Xylosma racemosa H.Lév.; Xylosma racemosa var. kwangtungensis (F.P.Metcalf) Rehder; Xylosma racemosum var. kwangtungense (F.P.Metcalf) Rehder

= Xylosma longifolia =

Longleaf logwood

Species of flowering plant

Xylosma longifolia, known by numerous common names in different cultures, is a species of flowering plant in the willow family Salicaceae. It is native to areas from India to China and mainland Southeast Asia, where it occurs in moist tropical and subtropical forests. It is a small tree or shrub, and is widely used in traditional medicines.

== Description ==
=== Trunk and foliage ===
Xylosma longifolia is an evergreen shrub or tree, typically reaching 4–7 m (13–23 ft) in height. Its gray-brown bark is scented, and the trunk may bear simple or branched spines, though they vary. Branchlets are glabrous (without hairs), often armed with axillary spines, and exhibit sympodial growth. The leaves are undivided and arranged alternately on the twigs. They have a short petiole measuring up to 8 mm (0.3 in) and a leathery blade measuring up to 15 cm (6 in) by 5 cm (2 in). Leaf shape is typically lanceolate but may be elliptic or obovate; they have an acute, cuneate, or rarely obtuse base, serrated edges, and an acuminate tip with an acumen, or "drip tip", about 1.5 cm (0.6 in) long. Lateral veins number 6–11 pairs, prominently raised on both surfaces.

=== Flowers ===
Flowers are either male or female, greenish, and measure about 3 mm (0.12 in) in diameter. They are borne in short racemes or reduced panicles within the leaf forks. The rachis is up to 2 cm (0.8 in) long, glabrous or puberulous (finely hairy). Pedicels (flower stems) are slender, puberulous, and about 2 mm (0.08 in) long. Bracts are ovate in male flowers and lanceolate in female flowers, measure about 1 mm (0.04 in), and glabrous or sparsely puberulous. Sepals, numbering 4–5, are persistent, ovate or lanceolate, about 2 mm (0.08 in) long, glabrous or sparsely puberulous outside, entirely glabrous inside, with entire to irregular margins. Petals are absent in both male and female flowers. Male flowers feature minute, 0.3 mm (0.01 in), ellipsoid, dorsifixed anthers and a disk with small, connate glands. Female flowers possess a superior ovary, measuring roughly 2 mm (0.08 in) with 2–3 placentas, each bearing 2–3 ovules. Styles, numbering 2–3, are very short, measuring less than 1 mm (0.04 in) and may be partly or completely joined.

=== Fruit ===
The fruit is a near-spherical berry, about 5 mm (0.20 in) in diameter, glabrous, and crustaceous, enclosed in a thin sheath without dark streaks. Initially red when ripe, it dries to black, with the calyx, disk, and style remaining attached. Fruit stems are slender, about 4 mm (0.16 in) long. Seeds, numbering 4–5, are brown, measure roughly 4 mm (0.16 in) long, ovoid, and flattened on one or more sides due to mutual compression. Flowering occurs from April to May, with fruiting from June to October.

== Distribution ==
It is native to the following regions as defined in the World Geographical Scheme for Recording Plant Distributions:

- China: China South-Central, China Southeast
- Eastern Asia: Hainan
- Indian Subcontinent: Assam, East Himalaya, India, Nepal, Pakistan, West Himalaya
- Indo-China: Laos, Myanmar, Thailand, Vietnam

== Ecology ==
Xylosma longifolia is found in moist subtropical and mountain forests, typically at elevations ranging from 600–1,600 m (2,000–5,200 ft), often thriving in ravines. It primarily relies on entomophily, though cleistogamy and allogamy also occur. Seed dispersal is facilitated through autochory, zoochory, and anthropochory.

== Taxonomy ==
Xylosma longifolia was first described by Nathaniel Wallich in 1845 as Flacourtia ferox, although it used a different type specimen. The original taxon was superseded in 1857 by Dominique Clos with Xylosma longifolium. Later, the genus underwent a grammatical gender concordance, initiated by William T. Stearn in 1992 when he questioned the genus’s gender, and finalized by Dan Henry Nicolson in 1994, putting Xylosma longifolia in agreement with the genus name. The collective number of synonyms across different sources is approximately 15.

Historically, Xylosma longifolia was placed in Flacourtiaceae under older classification systems such as those of Cronquist and Takhtajan. Eventually, Flacourtiaceae, including this taxon, were reclassified into Salicaceae, a placement adopted by the APG III system and subsequently recognized by Plants of the World Online, though this classification remains disputed.

=== Etymology ===
Due to its wide geographic distribution, Xylosma longifolia is known by numerous common names across different regions. In India alone, names vary by language and locale; notably known by chirundi, dandal, dieng-kani, godya, katari, kataponial, kandhara, mota-koli, nongleishang, katpatra, pansra, phalama, and sialu. In China, it is commonly called cháng yè zhà mù (Chinese: 長葉柞木) or cháng yè zuò mù (Chinese: 长叶柞木), while in Pakistan it is known as batti. In English, the plant is referred to as long-leaved xylosma or longleaf logwood.

The genus name Xylosma derives from xylon (Ancient Greek: ξύλον), meaning "wood" or "tree," and osmé (Ancient Greek: ὀσμή), meaning "smell," overall referring to the aromatic wood found in some species. The species epithet longifolia means "long-leaved", in reference to the length of the foliage of this species.

== Phytotherapy ==
Xylosma longifolia is a significant ethnomedicinal plant widely used in northeastern India, particularly in Assam and Manipur. Both its leaves and stem bark are valued in traditional medicine for treating numerous ailments, including liver disorders, jaundice, piles, dysentery, gastritis, stomach pain, kidney stones, coughs, acne, scabies, ringworm, dizziness, restlessness, insomnia, anxiety, muscular sprains, and skin infections. It is also employed to eliminate lice and ticks, and even used by some communities in brewing beer. The plant exhibits notable pharmacological properties such as antispasmodic, antioxidant, antifungal, antidermatophytic, and antitubercular effects. Tribal communities prepare decoctions, extracts, or topical applications from boiled leaves and bark depending on the condition being treated. Phytochemical screening of methanol extracts has revealed a rich profile of bioactive compounds, including alkaloids, flavonoids, phenols, tannins, terpenoids, and saponins. Spectroscopic and chromatographic analyses confirmed the presence of multiple functional groups and a variety of major and minor compounds. These findings underscore the therapeutic potential of the plant and point to the need for further research to isolate and develop new drugs from its phytoconstituents.

== Conservation status ==
Xylosma longifolia is broadly distributed with a stable and plentiful population. It currently faces no significant threats, and none are projected in the near future. Accordingly, it is listed as Least Concern by the IUCN Red List, though further research is needed to strengthen and expand upon this assessment.
