= Xylosma domingensis =

Scientific classification
- Kingdom: Plantae
- Clade: Embryophytes
- Clade: Tracheophytes
- Clade: Angiosperms
- Clade: Eudicots
- Clade: Rosids
- Order: Malpighiales
- Family: Salicaceae
- Genus: Xylosma
- Species: X. domingensis

Binomial name
- Xylosma domingensis (Urb.) M.H.Alford

Synonyms (Note: The synonymy of Xylosma domingensis remains uncontested, with its taxonomic history marked only by taxonomic corrections.)
- Priamosia domingensis Urb.; Xylosma microphylla Urb. & Ekman; Xylosma microphyllum Urb. & Ekman

Species of flowering plant

Xylosma domingensis is a species of flowering plant in the family Salicaceae, endemic to Hispaniola.

== Description ==
Xylosma domingensis is a dioecious shrub or tree reaching heights of 6 m (20 ft), with spreading branches and axillary, simple, slender spines measuring 3–10 mm (0.12–0.39 in), though sometimes unarmed. Young branchlets are sparsely farinose-pubescent at the tips, while older parts are grayish-brownish-corticate and bear small, round lenticels. The wood is bland, and the branches are hornotinous. Stipules are minute, measure 0.2 mm (0.0079 in), are equal, and triangular. Leaves are spirally arranged with a short petiole measuring 0.5–1.5 mm (0.020–0.059 in), and are ovate, obovate, or occasionally suborbicular, with broadly cuneate to truncate bases and rounded to obtuse or rarely subacuminate-attenuate apices. They measure 1–2 cm (0.39–0.79 in) long by 0.6–1.3 cm (0.24–0.51 in) wide, though some mature blades may reach up to 1.5 cm in length and 1.3 cm in width. The leaf margins are crenate distally with 1–4 crenulations per side or rarely entire. The texture is leathery to subcoriaceous; the upper surface is glaucous, green, and shining, while the lower surface is dull and glabrous, with a conspicuous though somewhat obscure network of lateral veins and a midrib slightly impressed above. When dry, the leaf blade resembles thin hornstone and darkens to a blackish hue. Male flowers are minute, solitary, and arise from an axillary rosette of squamiform bracteoles; they are very short-pedicellate, measuring roughly 1.3 mm (0.051 in), with apetalous buds enclosed in scales. The four sepals are free, membranous, ovate-triangular, slightly overlapping, and fimbriate-ciliate along the upper margins, each bearing a tooth above the base. They are pale with brownish, slightly thickened tips and measure about 1 mm (0.039 in) in length. The floral disc is annular, with four stamens inserted alternately between the sepals. Filaments are short, measuring 1.5 mm (0.059 in), and the anthers are orbicular-globose, 0.6 mm (0.024 in) in diameter, biloculate, and dehisce longitudinally outward. Pollen grains are tricolpate and smooth. A well-developed, conical-linear rudimentary ovary is present above the disc, free and with an intact apex. Female flowers have slender, glabrous pedicels 4–5 mm (0.16–0.20 in) long in young fruit. The fruit is globose, red, about 4 mm (0.16 in) in diameter, has 2 seeds, and is crowned by a short forked style.

== Distribution ==
The endemic extent of Xylosma domingensis is restricted to the Caribbean island of Hispaniola, where it is found in both the Dominican Republic and Haiti. One notable locality the plant occurs in is the Valley of Constanza, where it is supposedly very abundant although sterile. Though not explicitly stated to be introduced outside of its native range, it has been preserved in Spain.

== Ecology ==
Xylosma domingensis is a plant of the wet tropical biome, inhabiting hillsides, montane forests, pastures, thickets, and valleys, additionally found on calcareous soil. Within its range, it is seen across an elevational range of 850–1,600 m (2,790–5,250 ft).

== Taxonomy ==
Xylosma domingensis was first described by Ignatz Urban in 1919 as Priamosia domingensis, formerly the sole member of the now defunct monotypic genus, Priamosia, which is now a synonym of Xylosma. In 2006, the taxon was reassigned by Mac Haverson Alford to the currently accepted Xylosma domingensis. Several years before, the genus underwent a grammatical gender concordance, initiated by William T. Stearn in 1992 when he questioned the genus's gender, and finalized by Dan Henry Nicolson in 1994, although Xylosma domingensis was not subject to it because the taxon was published after the agreement. The collective number of synonyms across different sources is approximately 3.

The initial taxon, Priamosia domingensis, was first classified in the now defunct family Flacourtiaceae. Eventually, Flacourtiaceae, including this taxon, were reclassified into Salicaceae, a placement adopted by the APG III system and subsequently recognized by Plants of the World Online, though this classification remains disputed.

=== Etymology ===
The genus name Xylosma derives from xylon (Ancient Greek: ξύλον), meaning "wood" or "tree," and osmé (Ancient Greek: ὀσμή), meaning "smell," overall referring to the aromatic wood found in some species. The species epithet, domingensis, is derived from an alternative name for Hispaniola, that being Santo Domingo. As for the defunct genus Priamosia, it stems from Príamos (Ancient Greek: Πρίαμος), the Ancient Greek name for Priam, the last king of Troy during the Trojan War.
