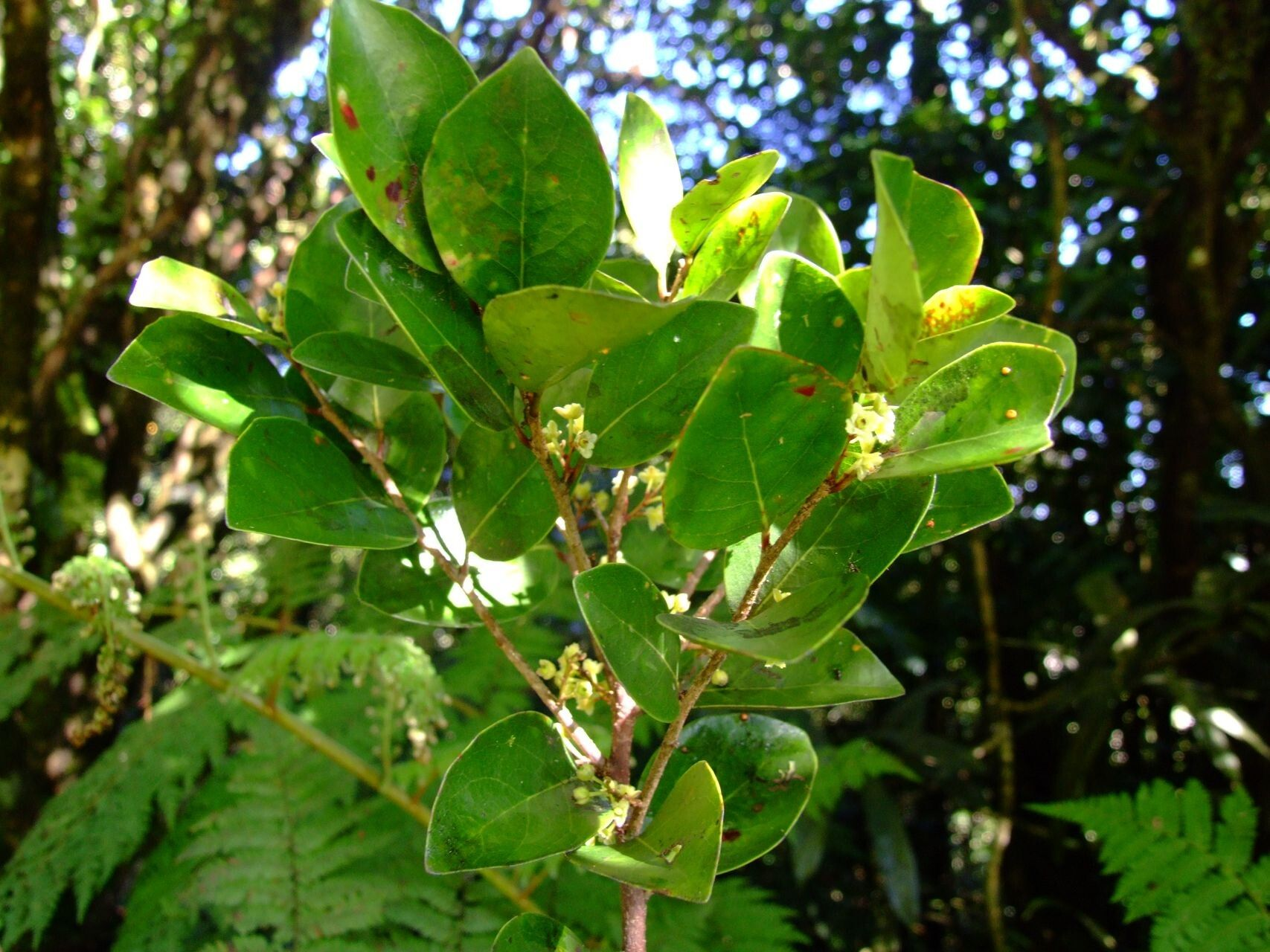
- The flowers and leaves of Xylosma reticulata.

Scientific classification
- Kingdom: Plantae
- Clade: Tracheophytes
- Clade: Angiosperms
- Clade: Eudicots
- Clade: Rosids
- Order: Malpighiales
- Family: Salicaceae
- Genus: Xylosma
- Species: X. reticulata

Binomial name
- Xylosma reticulata (Schltr.) Pillon

Synonyms
- List: Cyclostemon reticulatum Schltr.; Cyclostemon reticulatus Schltr.; Lasiochlamys reticulata (Schltr.) Pax & K.Hoffm.; Scolopia austrocaledonica Schltr.; Scolopia austro-caledonica Schltr.; Xylosma austrocaledonica (Schltr.) Sleumer; Xylosma austrocaledonicum (Schltr.) Sleumer; Xylosma austro-caledonicum (Schltr.) Sleumer

= Xylosma reticulata =

Species of flowering plant

Xylosma reticulata (syn. Lasiochlamys reticulata) is a species of flowering plant in the family Salicaceae, endemic to New Caledonia. Formerly the type species of Lasiochlamys, the new name was given in 2023 when the genus was transferred to Xylosma. It is listed as a protected species by the National Natural Heritage Inventory.

== Description ==
Xylosma reticulata is an upright shrub or tree reportedly reaching up to 7 m (23 ft) in height, typically branching from the base. Its stems are slender, terete, and glabrous throughout, with sparse foliage along their length. The simple leaves are alternately arranged and are obovate to rhomboid-elliptic, measuring 5–8 cm (2.0–3.1 in) in length and 3–4.5 cm (1.2–1.8 in) in width. They have a cuneate base and an apex that is usually rounded but may be pointed. The blades are leathery and hairless, with a fine network of reticulate veins and approximately five lateral vein pairs on each side. Petioles are short and supposedly orange, measuring 5–7 mm (0.20–0.28 in).

Flowers are small and unisexual, occurring in January, and appearing in condensed fascicles at the leaf axils. Each inflorescence is about 1 cm (0.39 in) long and typically contains five or more flowers, borne on slender pedicels 5–7 mm (0.20–0.28 in) in length. The flowers are actinomorphic and consist of 3–4 sepals and petals. Sepals are overlapping, rounded, and softly hairy on the inner surface; petals are slightly narrower and coated with fine, whitish hairs. Male flowers are reportedly reddish-yellow or yellow, with red flower buds observed in early stages. Female flowers are described by observers as yellowish-green, yellow, whitish, or greenish-white. In some individuals, 6–8 rounded tepals are observed, fringed with dense hairs. Perianth coloration is reportedly yellow-white, green-white, or white, with stamens matching the perianth in color. At the center is a smooth, ovoid ovary containing two ovules; the pistil is allegedly green. The style is very short and thick, ending in two broad, reniform stigmas. Surrounding the base of the ovary is an annular floral disc. Fruits are not formally described, but according to observers, numerous small fruits may develop directly along stems, and immature fruits appear green.

== Distribution and habitat ==
The range of Xylosma reticulata is restricted to New Caledonia, extending throughout Grande Terre, occurring across the communes of Bourail, Hienghène, Kouaoua, Ponérihouen, Pouébo, Poya, Thio, and Yaté. Notable locations where it is present include Mont Aoupinié within the communes of Ponérihouen and Poya; Mont Humboldt of the Yaté commune; Mont Nakada of the Thio commune; and Mont Panié and Mont Ou-Hinna of the Hienghène commune.

Xylosma reticulata is a tropical species that has been recorded in a range of montane and submontane habitats, at elevations of up to 1,250 m (4,100 ft). Habitats include forested slopes, montane forest edges, summit ridges, low humid forests on greywacke, and in forests growing on metamorphic rocks.

== Taxonomy ==
Xylosma reticulata was first described by Rudolf Schlechter in 1906 under the name Cyclostemon reticulatum, later standardized to Cyclostemon reticulatus. In 1922, the species was transferred to the new Lasiochlamys as its type species. It remained in the family Euphorbiaceae until 1974, when Hermann Otto Sleumer moved the genus to the now defunct family Flacourtiaceae. This system was brief however, as Sleumer would hastily refute the accuracy of the family in 1975. As a result, Lasiochlamys reticulata, along with its genus, were changed to be in Salicaceae.

An ecological study in 1980 by Tanguy Jaffré noted that Lasiochlamys could be differentiated from Xylosma for lacking the property of accumulating nickel, but this would later prove ineffective as a distinguishing trait. In 2005, Mac Haverson Alford published a thesis in which Lasiochlamys was suggested to be nested in Xylosma based on molecular phylogenetic analysis. It was not until 2023 however, when Lasiochlamys was ultimately synonymized with Xylosma by Yohan Pillon, resulting in the transfer of all of its species to the new classification. This revision resulted in the renaming of Lasiochlamys reticulata to its now recognized name; Xylosma reticulata. Decades earlier, Xylosma underwent a gender agreement whose purpose was to match the specific epithets with the female generic name; it was likely initiated by William T. Stearn in 1992 when he commented on the gender inaccuracy, and finalized by Dan Henry Nicolson in 1994. Despite this, Xylosma reticulata was not subject to it because the taxon was published after the agreement took place.

=== Etymology ===
The generic name Xylosma derives from xylon (Ancient Greek: ξύλον), meaning "wood" or "tree", and osmé (Ancient Greek: ὀσμή), meaning "smell", overall referring to the aromatic wood found in some species. The specific epithet, reticulata, denotes the leaf venation of this plant, as it means "netted-veined". As for the defunct genus Lasiochlamys, it stems from lasio- (Ancient Greek: λάσιος), meaning "hairy", and chlamys (Ancient Greek: χλαμύς), meaning "cloak".

== Conservation status ==
Xylosma reticulata is listed as a protected species by the National Natural Heritage Inventory under its previous name, though further information on its status is absent.
