= Xylosma glaberrima =

Conservation status
- Data Deficient (IUCN 2.3)

Scientific classification
- Kingdom: Plantae
- Clade: Tracheophytes
- Clade: Angiosperms
- Clade: Eudicots
- Clade: Rosids
- Order: Malpighiales
- Family: Salicaceae
- Genus: Xylosma
- Species: X. glaberrima

Binomial name
- Xylosma glaberrima Sleumer

Species of flowering plant

Xylosma glaberrima is a species of flowering plant in the family Salicaceae.

It is endemic to southeast Brazil, in Paraná (state), Rio de Janeiro (state), and São Paulo (state).

It occurs in Restinga and other Atlantic Forest habitats.
