= Bennettiodendron cordatum =

Conservation status
- Vulnerable (IUCN 2.3)

Scientific classification
- Kingdom: Plantae
- Clade: Tracheophytes
- Clade: Angiosperms
- Clade: Eudicots
- Clade: Rosids
- Order: Malpighiales
- Family: Salicaceae
- Genus: Bennettiodendron
- Species: B. cordatum

Binomial name
- Bennettiodendron cordatum Merr.

Species of flowering plant

Bennettiodendron cordatum is a species of flowering plant in the family Salicaceae.

The plant grows in open tropical forests at altitudes of about 400 m (1,300 ft). It is endemic to Vietnam in the provinces of Hà Tây, Hòa Bình, Lạng Sơn, and Quảng Ninh, with a disjunct population in Thừa Thiên Huế.

Bennettiodendron cordatum was first described by Elmer Drew Merrill in 1939.

== Description ==
Bennettiodendron cordatum is a small tree that reaches a height of 5–6 m (16–20 ft). The branches are smooth and glabrous, measuring about 1.5 mm (0.059 in) in diameter and densely pubescent. The leaves are firmly papery, oblong-elliptical in shape, and range from 8–6 cm (3.1–2.4 in) in length and 4–7 cm (1.6–2.8 in) in width. They are distinctly acuminate, slightly narrowed below, subabruptly rounded, and distinctly cordate with serrate margins. The teeth are subobtuse, measuring 4–9 mm (0.16–0.35 in) apart. The upper surface is olivaceous and glabrous beyond the ribs and nerves, which are slightly pubescent, while the lower surface is sub-concolorous and distinctly pubescent along the ribs and nerves. The primary reticulations are loosely raised and pubescent, with about 10 lateral nerves on each side, elevated below, very transparent, and arcuate-anastomosing. The petiole is 8–18 mm (0.31–0.71 in) long and densely pubescent. The racemose-paniculate inflorescences are usually terminal, solitary, and pubescent, measuring 5–7 cm (2.0–2.8 in) in length. The primary branches are short, 1–3 mm (0.039–0.118 in) long, and usually bear 2–3 flowers. The pedicels are puberulous and 2–3 mm (0.079–0.118 in) long. The flowers are trimerous, with sepals that are suborbicular-ovate, rounded, concave, submembranous, 3–3.5 mm (0.12–0.14 in) long, thinly 3–4 veined, glabrous on the outside, and more or less ciliate on the margin. There are numerous threads, with filaments measuring 3 mm (0.12 in) long and hairy. The glands are narrowly ovoid, glabrous, and 0.5 mm (0.020 in).

== Conservation status ==
Bennettiodendron cordatum is listed as VU by the IUCN Red List, though it was last assessed in 1998. Information on conservation actions and threats are absent because further research is still needed.
