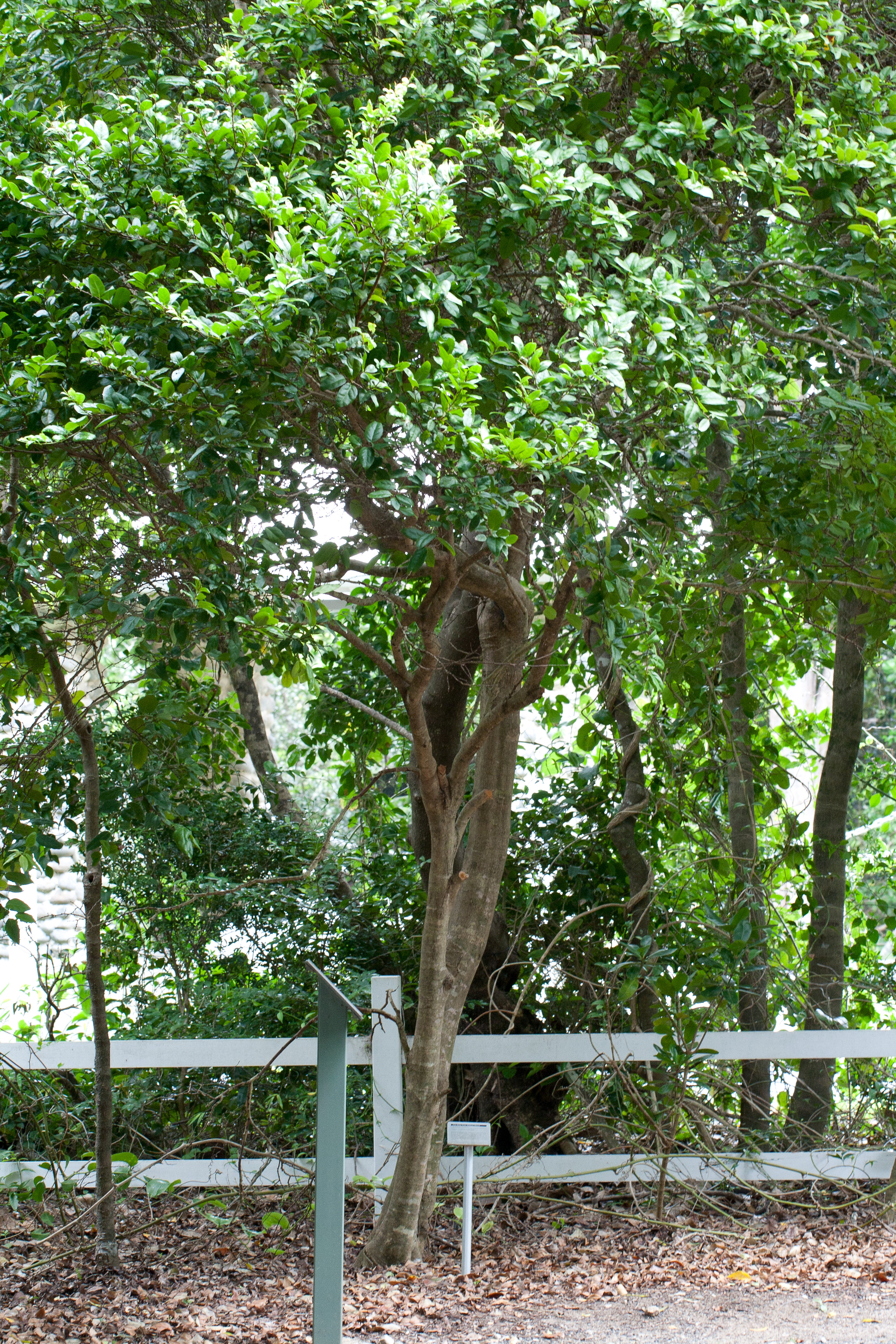

Scientific classification
- Kingdom: Plantae
- Clade: Tracheophytes
- Clade: Angiosperms
- Clade: Eudicots
- Clade: Rosids
- Order: Malpighiales
- Family: Salicaceae
- Genus: Xylosma
- Species: X. maidenii

Binomial name
- Xylosma maidenii Sleumer

= Xylosma maidenii =

Species of tree

Xylosma maidenii, commonly known as the ship tree or shitum wood is a small tree in the genus Xylosma of the family Salicaceae, endemic to the lowland forests of Australia's Lord Howe Island in the Tasman Sea. The male and female trees are separate, and flower from December to May. The flowers are small and lead to purple/black fruit that comes directly off twigs. When cut, the timber gives off a foul odour.

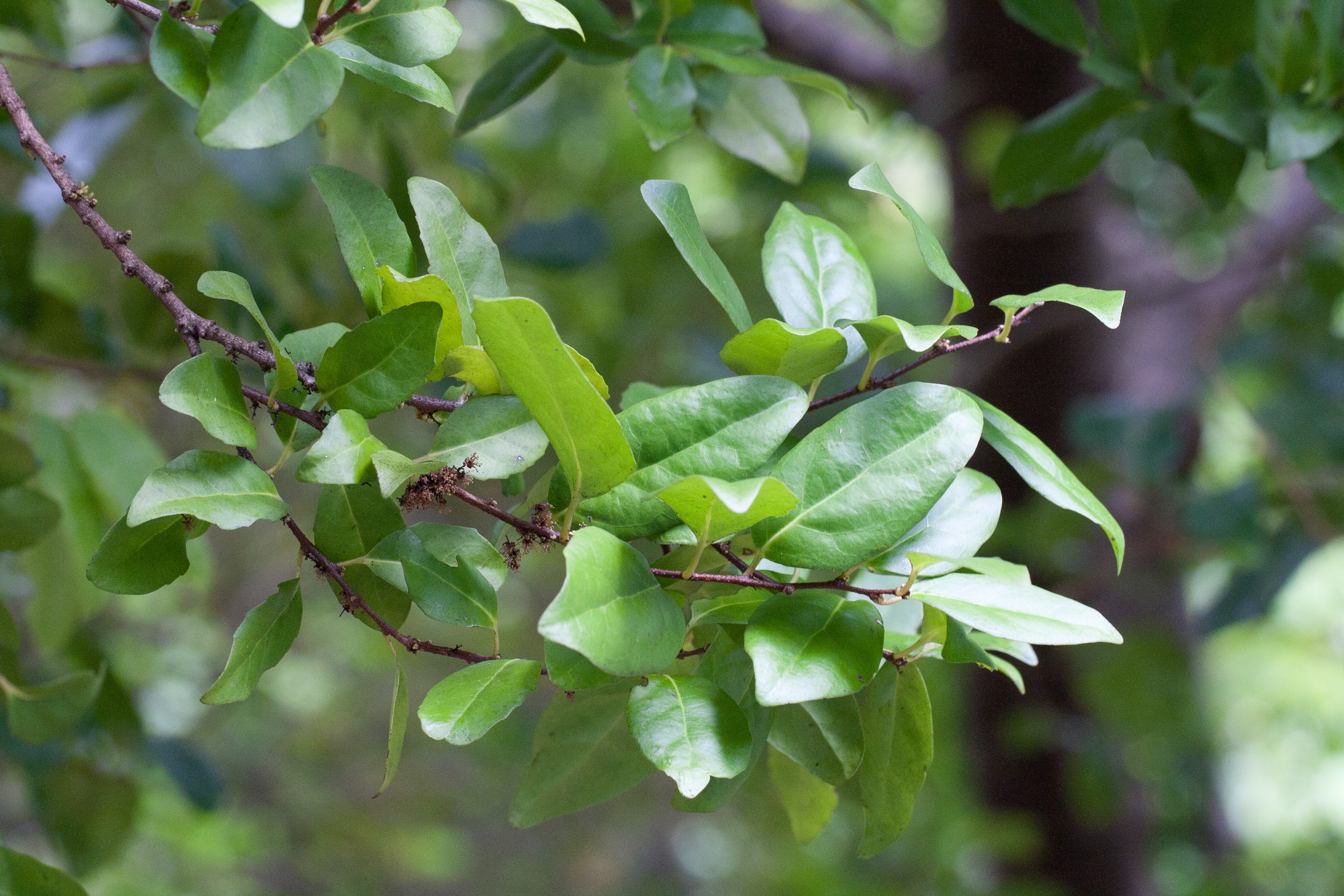
Leaves
