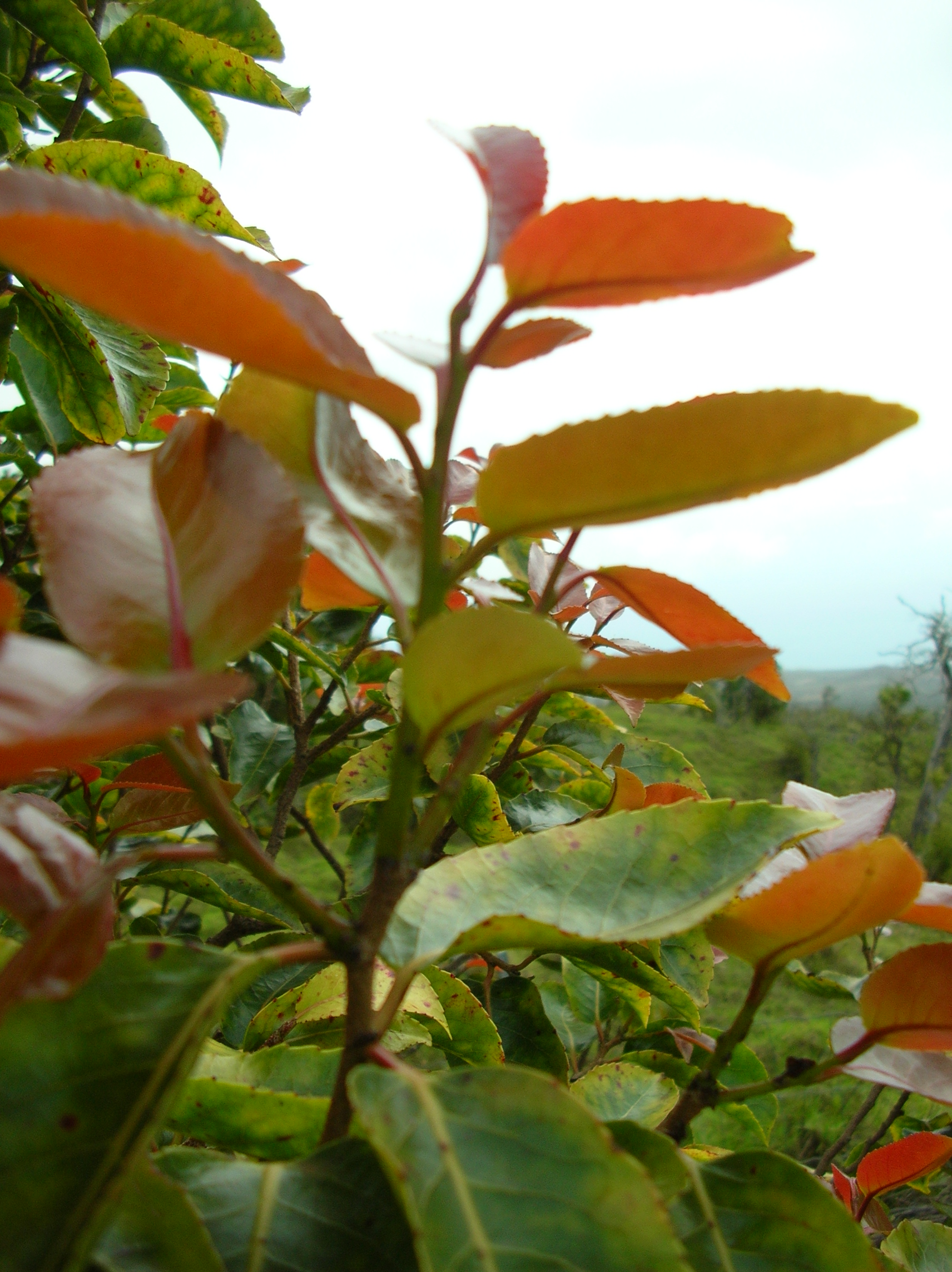

Conservation status
- Least Concern (IUCN 3.1)

- Vulnerable (NatureServe)

Scientific classification
- Kingdom: Plantae
- Clade: Tracheophytes
- Clade: Angiosperms
- Clade: Eudicots
- Clade: Rosids
- Order: Malpighiales
- Family: Salicaceae
- Genus: Xylosma
- Species: X. hawaiensis

Binomial name
- Xylosma hawaiensis Seem.

Synonyms
- Drypetes forbesii Sherff.

= Xylosma hawaiensis =

Species of tree

Xylosma hawaiensis is a species of flowering plant in the family Salicaceae, that is endemic to Hawaii. Common names include Hawai'i brushholly, maua, and aʻe (Maui only).

== Description ==
Xylosma hawaiensis is a small deciduous tree, reaching a height of 3–9 m (9.8–29.5 ft). The alternate, elliptical leaves are 5–10 cm (2.0–3.9 in) long, 3–7.5 cm (1.2–3.0 in) wide, and produced on thin petioles 1–2 cm (0.39–0.79 in) in length. Young leaves are bronze green, reddish, or copper-colored with red veins, aging to shiny dark green on top and slightly shiny green on bottom. Twigs are initially dark red and mature to a dark brown. Racemes 13–25 mm (0.51–0.98 in) long are produced at the bases of new leaves or the back of leaves. The dioecious flowers are greenish or reddish and 6 mm (0.24 in) in diameter. Female plants produce abundant berries in the summer and fall that are deep red when ripe and about 1 cm (0.39 in) in diameter.

== Habitat ==
Maua can be found in dry, mixed mesic, and, occasionally, wet forests at elevations of 400–1,220 m (1,310–4,000 ft).
