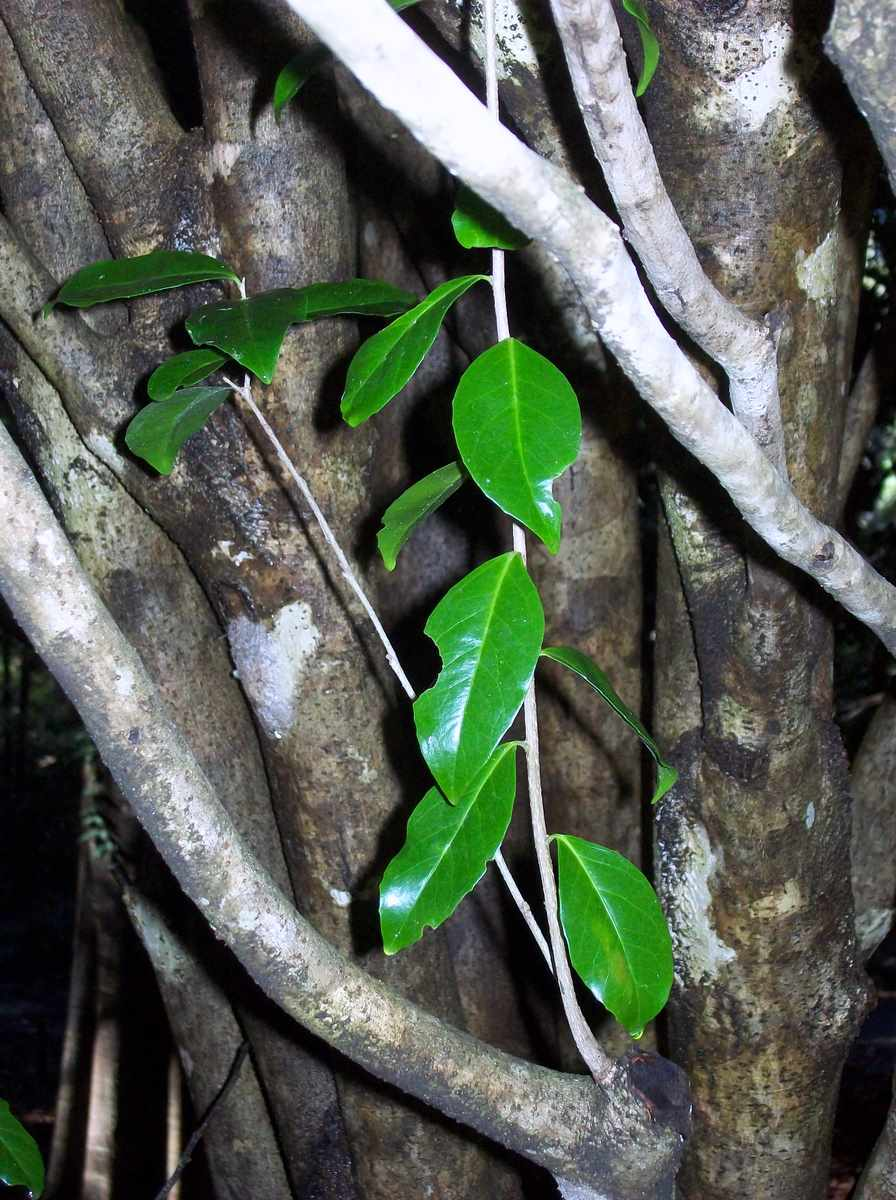

Conservation status
- Endangered (EPBC Act)

Scientific classification
- Kingdom: Plantae
- Clade: Tracheophytes
- Clade: Angiosperms
- Clade: Eudicots
- Clade: Rosids
- Order: Malpighiales
- Family: Salicaceae
- Genus: Xylosma
- Species: X. terrae-reginae

Binomial name
- Xylosma terrae-reginae C.T.White & Sleumer

= Xylosma terrae-reginae =

Species of tree

Xylosma terrae-reginae is a species of rainforest tree of eastern Australia. The habitat is in sea side or relatively dry rainforest areas, mostly on private property. Found as far south as Ballina, New South Wales to as far north as near Maryborough, Queensland. It is listed as endangered by extinction. As this is a relatively unknown plant, it has no common name as such, apart from the generic name Xylosma.

The generic name refers to a "woody smell" of the related Xylosma orbiculatum. The specific epithet is a translation of Queensland, where this plant is mostly found.

== Description ==
A small tree or shrub, up to 15 metres tall. The trunk is often irregular or crooked, with many branches from near the base, but it is not flanged or buttressed. The bark is greyish or fawn in colour. Fairly smooth but with darker lenticels. Small branches also fawn with prominent lenticels. Leaf scars also noticeable.

Leaves are 4 to 10 cm long, though juvenile leaves are up to 15 cm long, elliptical or ovate in shape. Dark green and glossy on the upper side. Glands appear at the base of the leaf, or on the leaf stalk. Glands may also be seen along the leaf margin. The green leaf stalks are around 5 to 7 mm long.

=== Flowers, fruit and regeneration ===
White flowers form from the leaf axils, either in bundles or short racemes. The flowering period is from April to June. The fruit is a red berry, 8 to 10 mm in diameter. Up to four fruit are clustered together, on stalks 2 mm long. Two to four pink or brown seeds inside the berry, 2 to 3 mm in diameter. Fruit matures from January to April. After six weeks, a germination success rate of 30% may be expected.

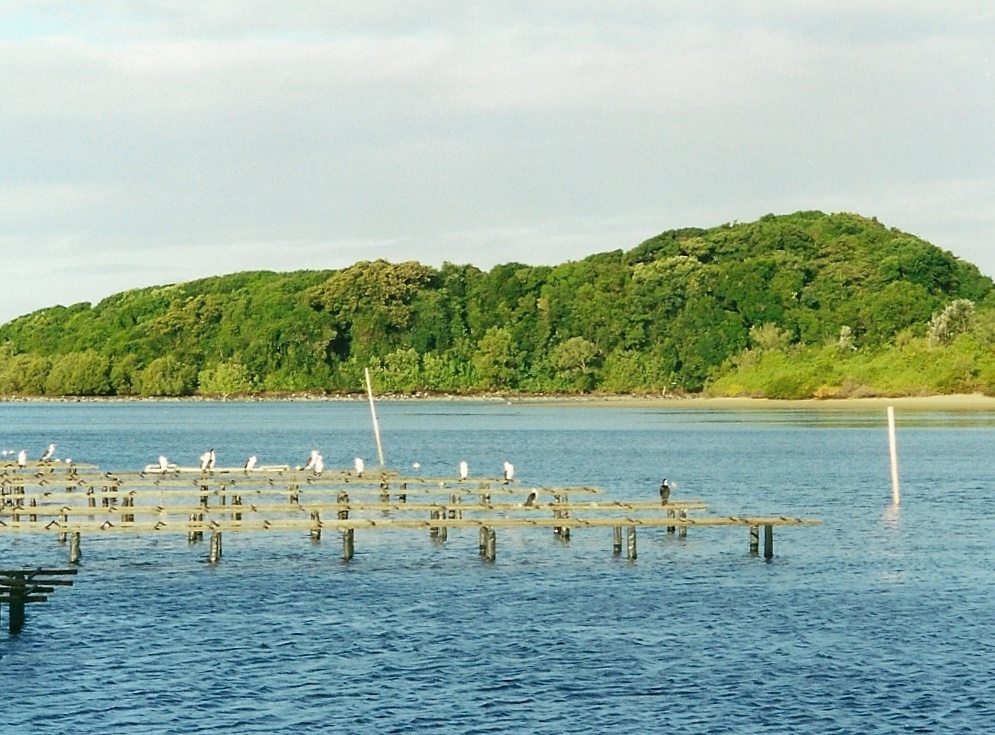
Xylosma terrae-reginae grows at Brunswick Heads, Australia
