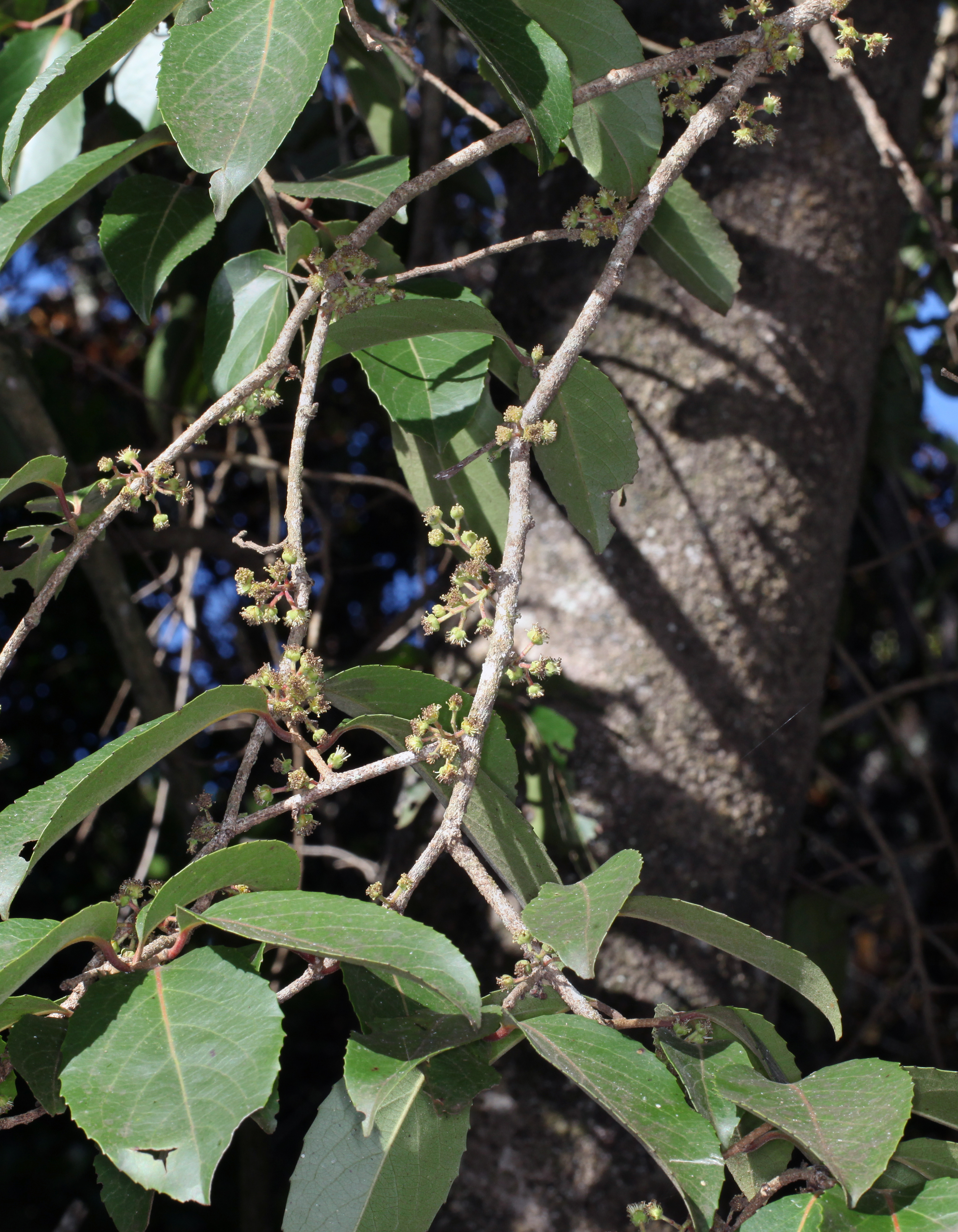

Conservation status
- Critically Endangered (IUCN 3.1)

Scientific classification
- Kingdom: Plantae
- Clade: Tracheophytes
- Clade: Angiosperms
- Clade: Eudicots
- Clade: Rosids
- Order: Malpighiales
- Family: Salicaceae
- Genus: Xylosma
- Species: X. crenata

Binomial name
- Xylosma crenata (H.St.John) H.St.John, 1976

Synonyms
- Antidesma crenatum H.St.John

= Xylosma crenata =

Species of tree

Xylosma crenata, the sawtooth logwood, is a species of flowering plant in the family Salicaceae.

It is endemic to the island of Kauaʻi in Hawaii. It is a tree, reaching a height of 46 ft (14 m).

Sawtooth logwood inhabits montane mesic forests dominated by koa (Acacia koa) and ʻōhiʻa lehua (Metrosideros polymorpha) at an elevations of 975–1,065 m (3,199–3,494 ft).

It is threatened by habitat loss.
