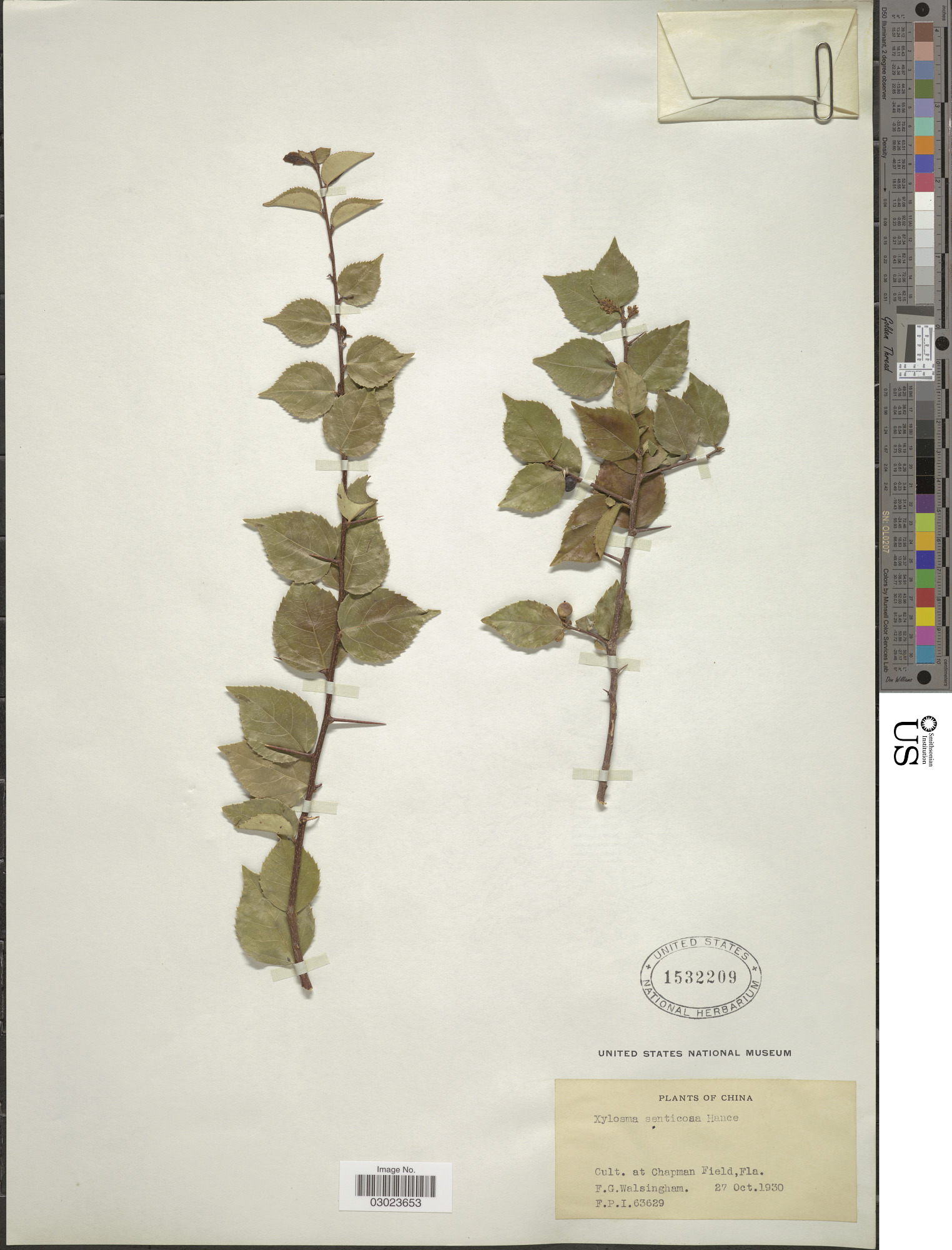
- Herbarium specimen

Scientific classification
- Kingdom: Plantae
- Clade: Tracheophytes
- Clade: Angiosperms
- Clade: Eudicots
- Clade: Rosids
- Order: Malpighiales
- Family: Salicaceae
- Genus: Xylosma
- Species: X. senticosa

Binomial name
- Xylosma senticosa Hance

Synonyms
- Myroxylon senticosum (Hance) Warb.

= Xylosma senticosa =

Species of flowering plant

Xylosma senticosa is a species of plant in the family Salicaceae. It is native to China and Taiwan.
