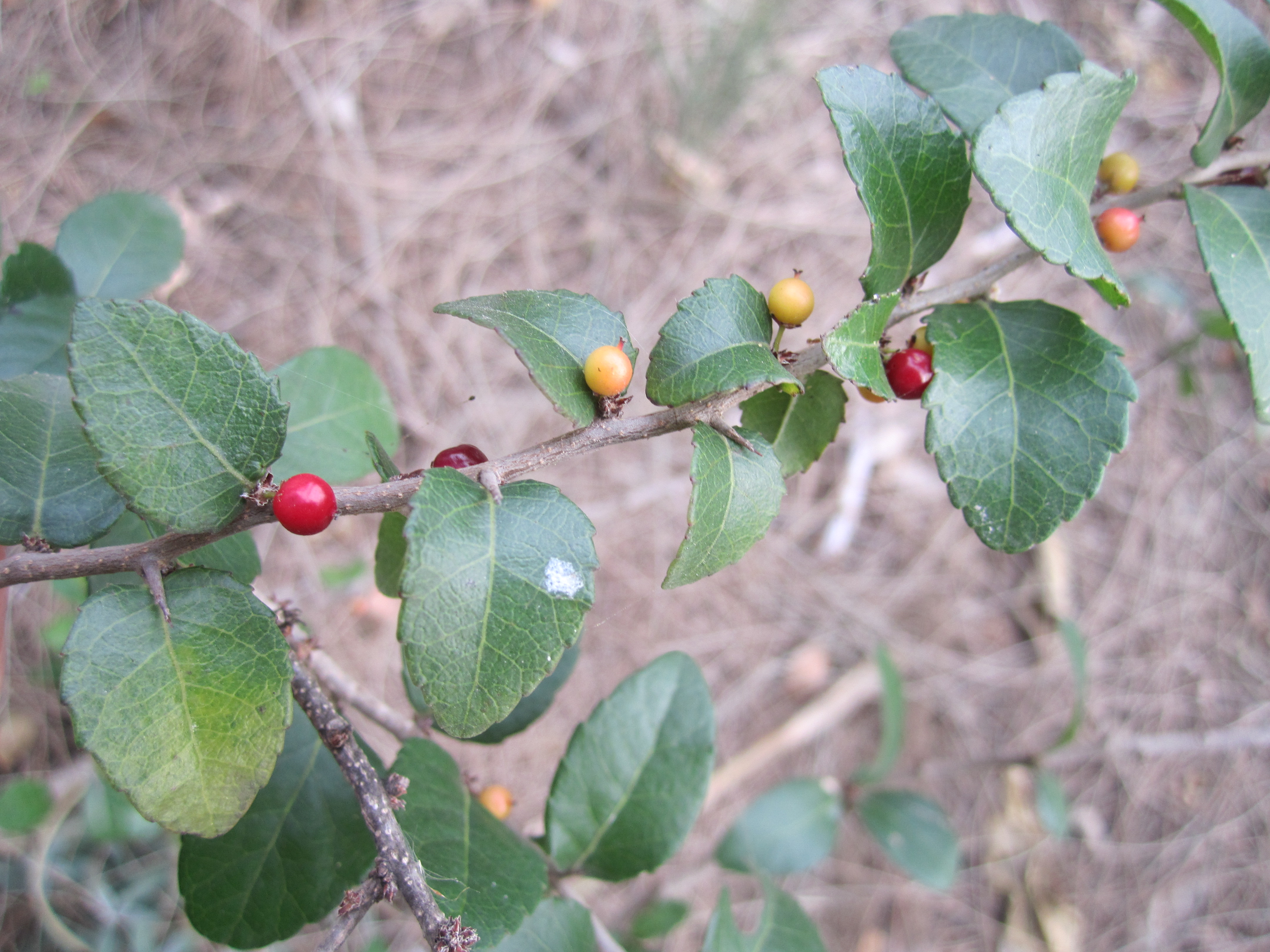

Conservation status
- Least Concern (IUCN 3.1)

- Secure (NatureServe)

Scientific classification
- Kingdom: Plantae
- Clade: Tracheophytes
- Clade: Angiosperms
- Clade: Eudicots
- Clade: Rosids
- Order: Malpighiales
- Family: Salicaceae
- Genus: Xylosma
- Species: X. flexuosa

Binomial name
- Xylosma flexuosa (Kunth) Hemsl.

Synonyms
- Flacourtia flexuosa Kunth

= Xylosma flexuosa =

Species of flowering plant

Xylosma flexuosa, commonly known as brushholly or coronilla, is a species of flowering plant in the family Salicaceae, that is native to southern North America and northern South America. Its range stretches from southern Texas in the United States south through Mexico and Central America to Venezuela. It can also be found on the island of Curaçao in the Netherlands Antilles. Brush holly is a spiny evergreen shrub, usually reaching a height of 1–2 m (3.3–6.6 ft) but able to attain 6–8 m (20–26 ft) in height. Red and yellow berries around 7–8 mm (0.28–0.31 in) in diameter are found on the plant throughout the year. It is sometimes cultivated as an ornamental hedge.
