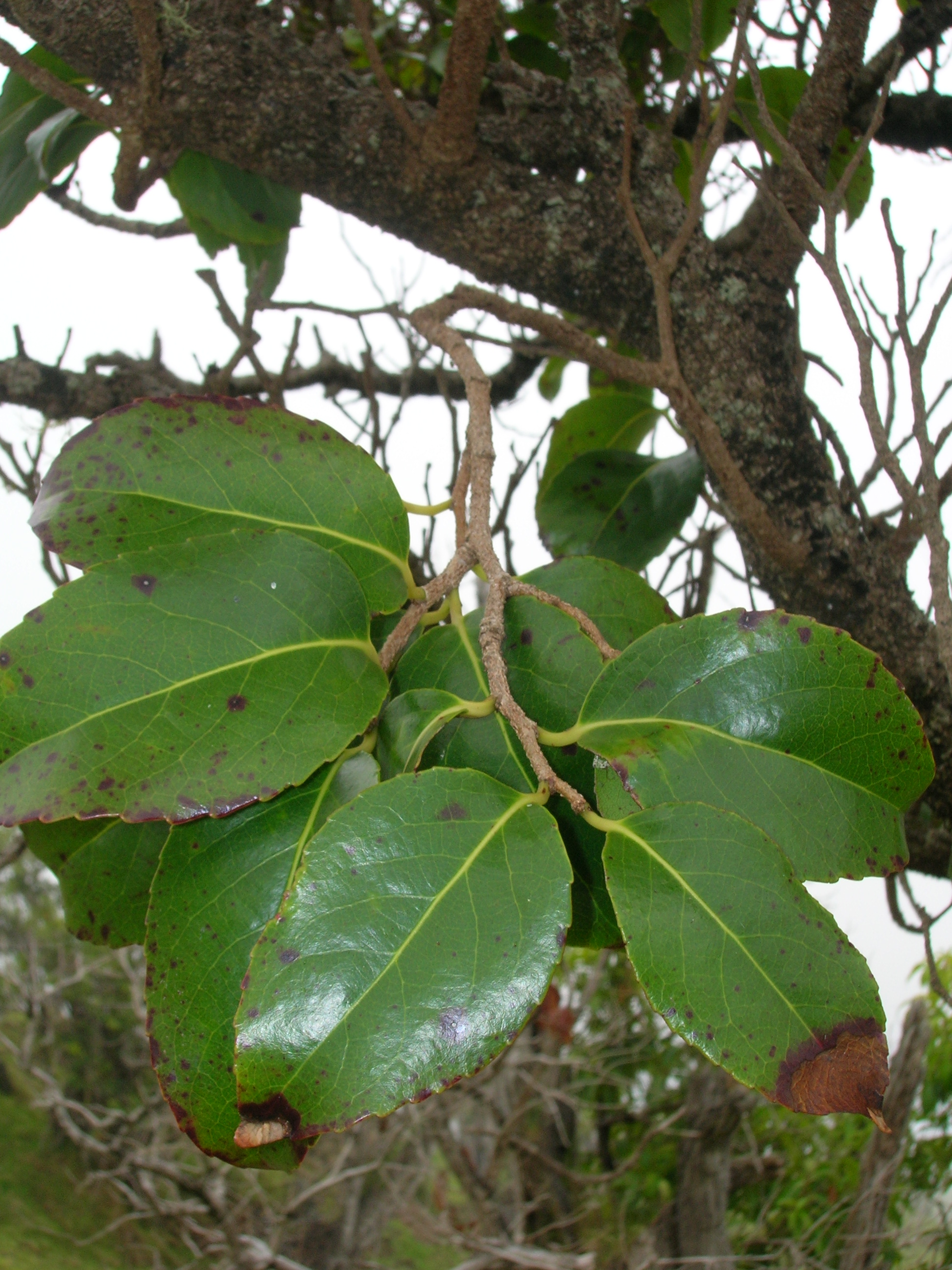
- Xylosma hawaiensis

Scientific classification
- Kingdom: Plantae
- Clade: Embryophytes
- Clade: Tracheophytes
- Clade: Spermatophytes
- Clade: Angiosperms
- Clade: Eudicots
- Clade: Rosids
- Order: Malpighiales
- Family: Salicaceae
- Subfamily: Salicoideae
- Tribe: Saliceae
- Genus: Xylosma; G.Forst., 1786

Type species
- Xylosma orbiculata (J.R.Forst. & G.Forst.) G.Forst.

Diversity
- About 110 species

Synonyms
- List: Craepaloprumnon (Endl.) H.Karst.; Eichlerodendron Briq.; Hisingera Hell.; Lasiochlamys Pax & K.Hoffm.; Lightfootia Sw.; Myroxylon J.R.Forst. & G.Forst.; Priamosia Urb.; Roumea DC., orth. var.; Rumea Poit.

= Xylosma =

Genus of flowering plants

Xylosma /zaɪˈlɒzmə/ is a genus of flowering plants in the family Salicaceae. It contains around 100 species of evergreen shrubs and trees commonly known as brushhollies, xylosmas, or, more ambiguously, "logwoods". The generic name is derived from the Greek words ξύλον (xylon), meaning "wood, tree", and ὀσμή (osmé), meaning "smell", referring to the fragrant wood of some of the species. The Takhtajan system places it in the family Flacourtiaceae, which is considered defunct by the Angiosperm Phylogeny Group.

== Description ==
The leaves are alternate, simple, entire or finely toothed, 2–10 cm (0.79–3.94 in) long. The flowers are small, yellowish, produced on racemes 1–3 cm (0.39–1.18 in) long, usually dioecious, and have a strong scent. The fruit is a small purple-black berry 5–10 mm (0.20–0.39 in) in diameter that contains 2 to 8 seeds.

== Selected species ==
- Xylosma bahamensis (Britton) Standl.
- Xylosma benthamii (Tul.) Triana & Planch.
- Xylosma buxifolia A.Gray
- Xylosma ciliatifolia (Clos) Eichler
- Xylosma congesta (Lour.) Merr.
- Xylosma crenata (H.St.John) H.St.John
- Xylosma domingensis (Urb.) M.H.Alford
- Xylosma flexuosa (Kunth) Hemsl.
- Xylosma glaberrima Sleumer
- Xylosma hawaiensis Seem.
- Xylosma intermedia (Seem.) Triana & Planch.
- Xylosma longifolia Clos
- Xylosma maidenii Sleumer
- Xylosma orbiculata (J.R.Forst. & G.Forst.) G.Forst.
- Xylosma panamensis Turcz.
- Xylosma prockia (Turcz.) Turcz.
- Xylosma pseudosalzmannii Sleumer
- Xylosma reticulata (Schltr.) Pillon
- Xylosma serrata (Sw.) Urb.
- Xylosma spiculifera (Tul.) Triana & Planch.
- Xylosma suaveolens (J.R.Forst. & G.Forst.) G.Forst.
- Xylosma terrae-reginae C.T.White & Sleumer
- Xylosma tweediana (Clos) Eichler
- Xylosma venosa N.E.Br.

== Distribution ==
The genus is predominantly native to the tropics and subtropics, from the Caribbean, Central America, northern South America, the Pacific Islands, southern Asia and northern Australasia. One species, X. congesta, is found in warm-temperate eastern Asia (China, Korea and Japan). Molecular phylogenetic analysis suggest that the genus Lasiochlamys from New Caledonia may be nested in Xylosma.

== Ecology ==
Xylosma foliage is used as food by the caterpillars of some lepidoptera, such as the rustic (Cupha erymanthis), which feeds on X. congesta (syn. X. racemosa), and the common leopard (Phalanta phalantha), which feeds on X. longifolia and X. congesta.

== Uses ==
The main use for the genus is as hedge and topiary plants among gardeners in desert and chaparral climates. Xylosma congesta is the species usually seen in garden hedges and in road landscaping, despite the fact it bears thorns. Other species cultivated for these purposes include X. bahamensis, X. flexuosa, and X. spiculifera (syn. X. heterophylla). X. longifolia is sometimes grown in India for its edible fruits. In addition, a medicinal extract is made from its young leaves that acts as antispasmodic, narcotic, and sedative. 15 species of the genus have reported medicinal or veterinary use.
