= Dactylispa albopilosa =

Scientific classification
- Kingdom: Animalia
- Phylum: Arthropoda
- Clade: Pancrustacea
- Class: Insecta
- Order: Coleoptera
- Suborder: Polyphaga
- Infraorder: Cucujiformia
- Family: Chrysomelidae
- Genus: Dactylispa
- Species: D. albopilosa

Binomial name
- Dactylispa albopilosa (Gestro, 1890)

Synonyms
- Hispa albopilosa Gestro, 1888; Hispa discicollis Gestro, 1890; Dactylispa discicollis; Dactylispa kamarupa Maulik, 1919; Hispa maculata Gestro, 1890; Dactylispa maculata; Dactylispa soror Weise, 1897

Species of beetle

Dactylispa albopilosa is a species of leaf beetle found in India (Arunachal Pradesh, Assam, Karnataka, Kerala, Maharashtra, Sikkim, Tamil Nadu, West Bengal), Sri Lanka, Nepal, Bangladesh, Indonesia, Malaysia and Myanmar.

It is a pest of Sorghum bicolor, but has also been recorded from Sorghum vulgare, Prunus and Guaiacum species, as well as Zea mays and Andropogon sorghum.
