= Floral axis =

Area of a flower containing reproductive and ancillary organs

The floral axis (sometimes referred to as the receptacle) is the area of the flower upon which the reproductive organs and other ancillary organs are attached. It is also the point at the center of a floral diagram. Many flowers in division Angiosperma appear on floral axes. The floral axis can differ in form depending on the type of plant. For example, monocotyledons have a weakly developed floral axis compared to dicotyledons, and will therefore rarely possess a floral disc, which is common among dicotyledons.

== Floral diagramming ==
A typical example of a floral diagram. The floral axis (receptacle) is the circle in the middle, surrounded by staminodes, petals, and sepals. The main axis is the circle at the top of the diagram

Floral diagramming is a method used to graphically describe a flower. In the context of floral diagramming, the floral axis represents the center point around which the diagram is oriented. The floral axis can also be referred to as the receptacle in floral diagrams or when describing the structure of the flower. The main or mother axis in floral diagrams is not synonymous with the floral axis, rather it refers to where the stem of the flower is in relation to the diagram. The floral axis is also useful for identifying the type of symmetry that a flower exhibits.

== Function ==
The floral axis serves as the attachment point for organs of the flower, such as the reproductive organs (pistil and stamen) and other organs such as the sepals and carpels. The floral axis acts much like a modified stem and births the organs that are attached to it. The fusion of a plant's organs and the amount of organs that are developed from the floral axis largely depends on the determinateness of the floral axis. The floral axis does perform different functions for different types of plants. For instance, with dicotyledons, the floral axis acts as a nectary, while that is not the case with monocotyledons. More specialized functions can also be performed by the floral axis. For example, in the plant Hibiscus, the floral axis is able to proliferate and produce fruit, rendering processes like self pollination unnecessary.

A diagram of a flower showing the different organs and their placement on the flower.
