= Dominique Clos =

French physician and botanist

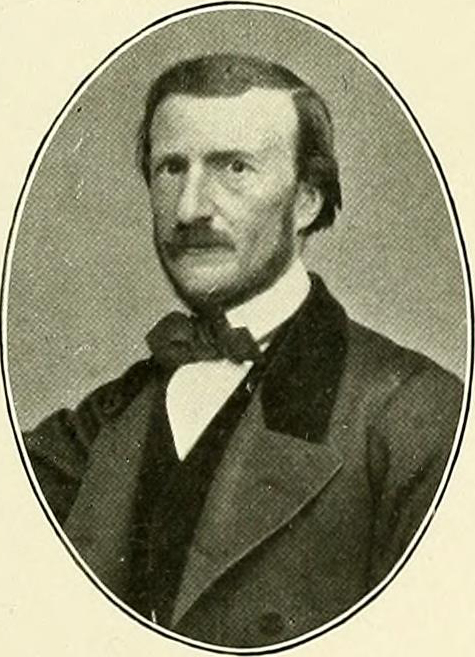
- Born: 25 May 1821; Sorèze, France
- Died: 19 August 1908 (aged 87); Sorèze, France
- Scientific career
- Fields: botany
- Theses: Ébauche de la rhizotaxie, ou, De la disposition symétrique des radicelles sur la souches (1848); La détermination de la véritable nature des radicelles (1848)

Dominique Clos (25 May 1821, Sorèze – 19 August 1908) was a French physician and botanist.

He studied medicine and sciences in Toulouse and Paris, obtaining his medical degree in 1845 and his PhD in natural sciences in 1848. In 1853 he succeeded Alfred Moquin-Tandon as professor of botany at the University of Toulouse, maintaining this position until his retirement in 1889. At Toulouse, he made major contributions to its botanical garden and herbarium. From 1881 to 1908, he was a correspondent-member of the Académie des sciences.

He was the author of numerous works on descriptive botany, plant teratology, phytogeography and agricultural botany. As a taxonomist, he described many species from various plant families. Taxa with the specific epithet of closianus are named in his honor' an example being Astragalus closianus.

== Partial bibliography ==
- Etudier les fluides des végétaux et les comparer à ceux des animaux, Montpellier, (May 1851).
- Première leçon faite à la Faculté des sciences de Toulouse, le 25 mai 1853, pour l'ouverture du cours de botanique, Toulouse : impr. de Bonnal et Gibrac, (1853).
- Fascicule d'observations de tératologie végétale, Toulouse : impr. de Douladoure frères, (1859).
- Considérations sur les graines envisagées du point de vue agricole, Toulouse : impr. de Douladoure frères, (1859).
- Coup-d'oeil sur la végétation de la partie septentrionale du département de l'Aude, Bordeaux : Maison Lafargue, (1863).
- Coup d'oeil sur les principes qui servent de base aux classifications botaniques modernes, Toulouse : Impr. Douladoure, (1869).
- Le polymorphisme floral et la phytographie, Paris : Au secrétariat de l'association, (1893).
- L'Astragale en faux, plante fourragère, Paris : au siège social de la Société nationale d'acclimatation de France, (1895).
