= Central Range (New Caledonia) =

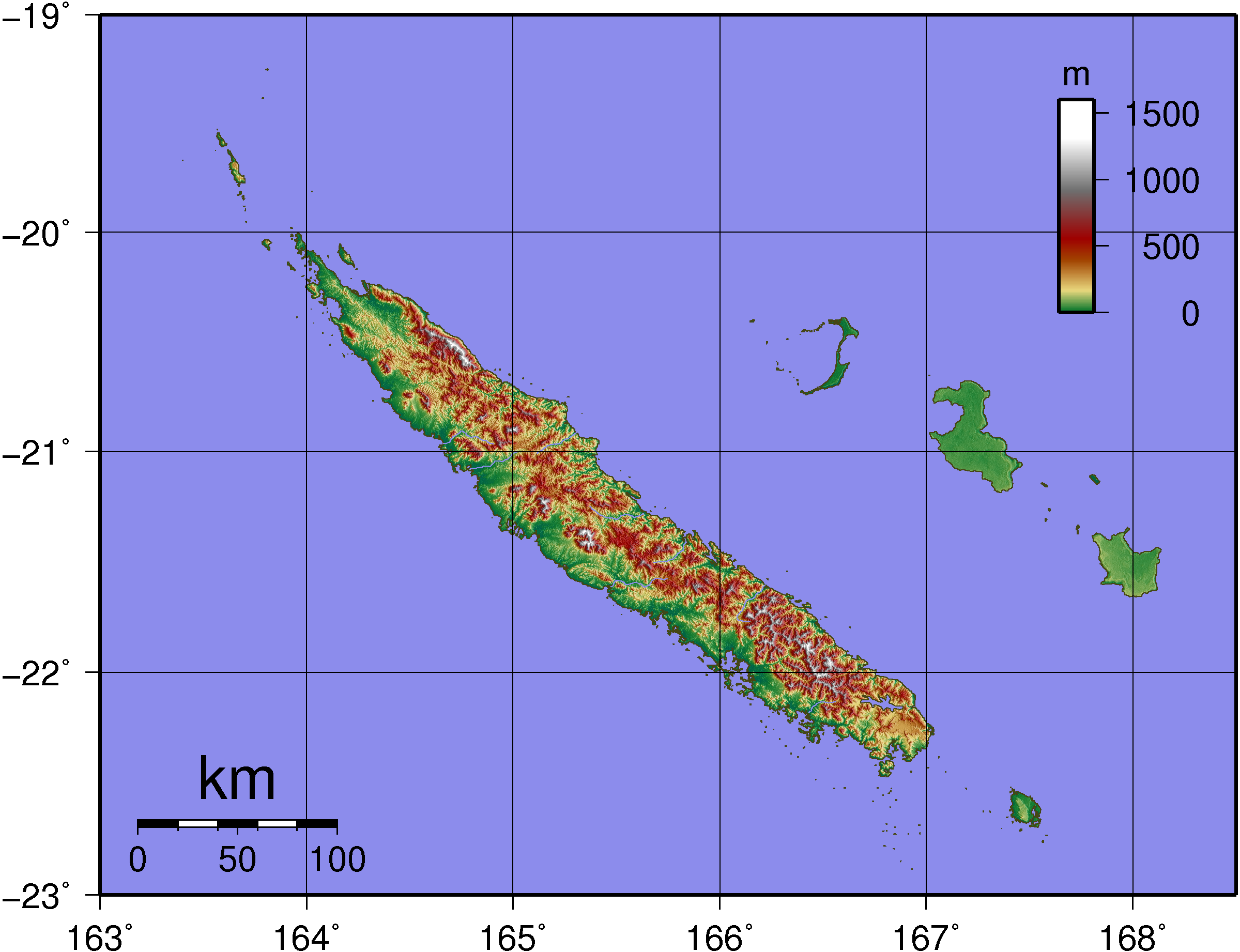
- Relief map of New Caledonia

Highest point
- Peak: Mont Panié
- Elevation: 1,629 m (5,344 ft)

Dimensions
- Length: 400 km (250 mi)

Geography
- Country: France
- Region: New Caledonia

Geology
- Rock age: Permian

The Central Range (French: Chaîne centrale) is a mountain range in New Caledonia, an oversea collectivity of France. This mountain range covers more than half of the island of Grande Terre from north to south.

== Geography ==
=== Topography ===
The Central Range consists of geological formation dating from the Permian age (225–280 million years ago) to the Tertiary period (1.5–65 million years ago) and is formed by a series of folds, the last of which dates from the Eocene to the Oligocene epoch (about 26-53 million years ago).

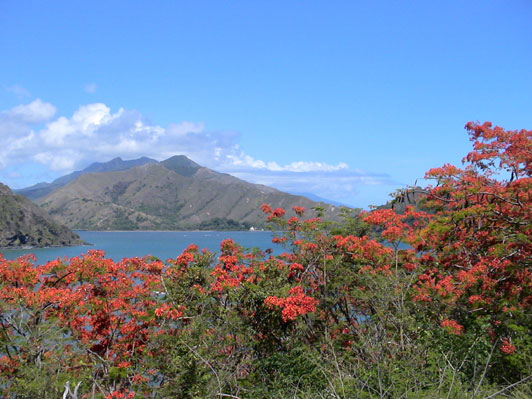
View of Mont Panié.

The Central Range forms a true backbone for Grande Terre. Its southeast-northwest axis is of the same length as that of the island, along whose entire length it extends. It divides Grande Terre into two parts: the West Coast or the New Caledonia dry forests, which is the most populated part and contains the largest city Noumea, consisting of wide plains that gradually rise towards the range; The East coast or the New Caledonia rain forests is narrower due to the mountains plunging abruptly into the sea. The Central range also acts as a climatic barrier: it forms a significant obstacle to prevailing winds, making the east coast more exposed and therefore generally wetter, with denser vegetation than the drier west coast, which is primarily composed of savanna, more suitable for livestock farming, or sclerophyll forest.

It is a relatively low mountain range with the exception of the five highest peaks on the island, two of which exceed 1500m (Mont Panié (1629 m) in the north and Mont Humboldt (1618 m) in the South), others include Mount Aopinie and the Koniambo Massif. Rich in nickel, the main mining deposits are found in the mountain range: Koniambo in the north, Thio, Canala, and Kouaoua.

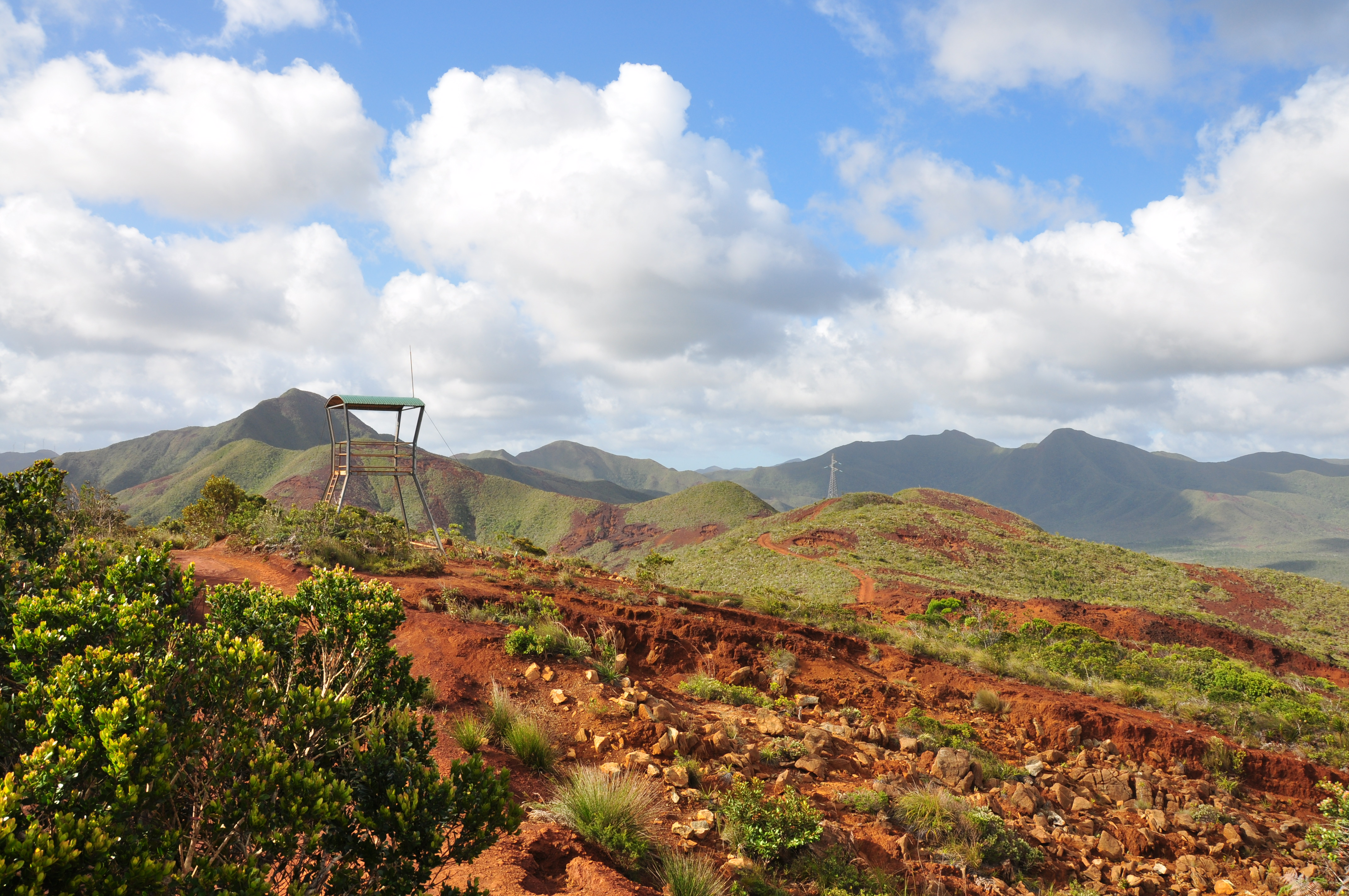
Prony Pass, south of the Central Range.

=== Biodiversity ===
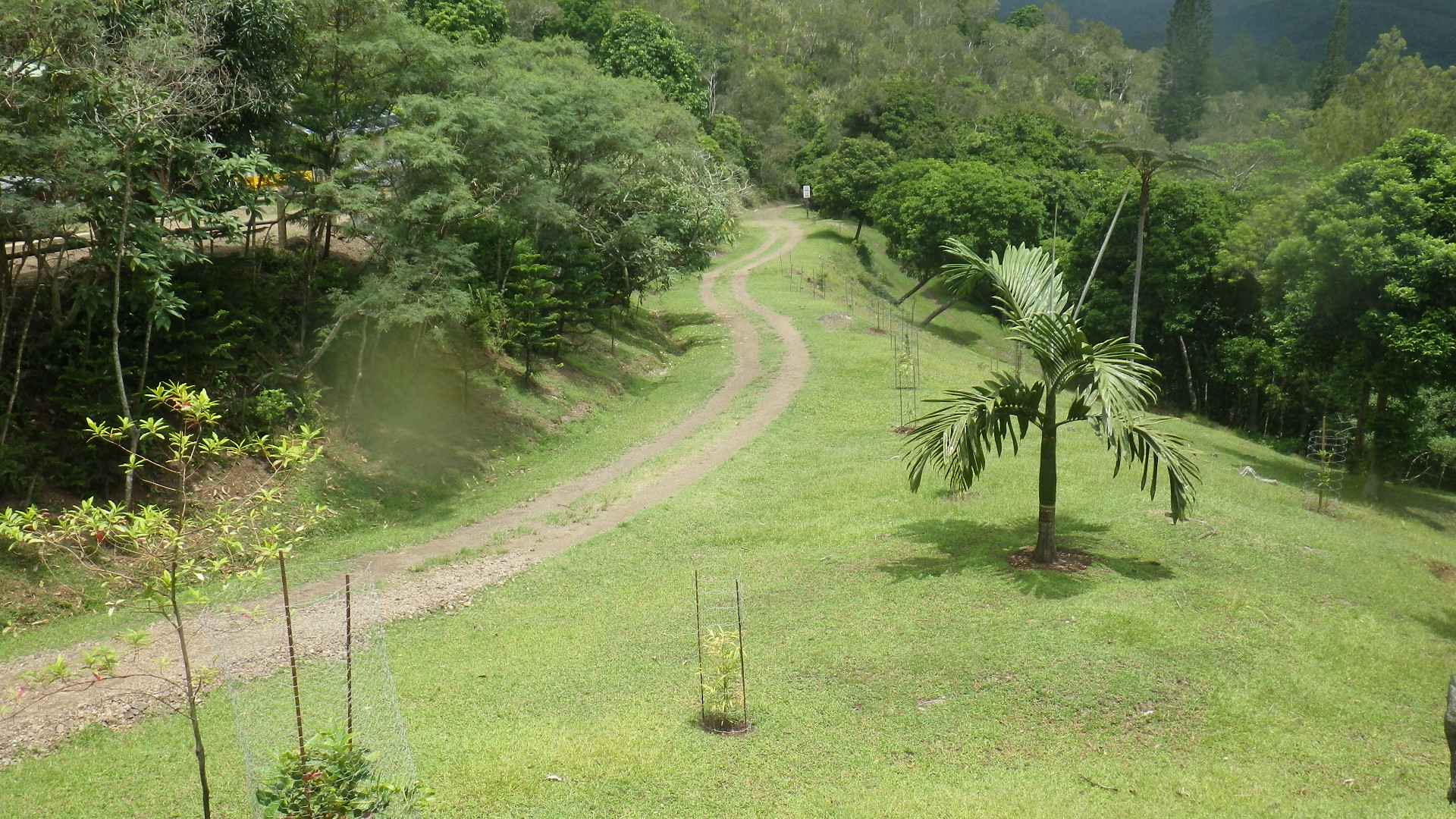
Road through the Grandes Fougères park.

The Central Range allows the development of particular biotopess that greatly contribute to the high rate of endemism that characterizes the biodiversity of New Caledonia. It is covered mainly with dense evergreen humid forest, which is also found on the Isle of Pines and on the Loyalty Islands Province, sometimes called primeval forest because it is the oldest and contains many panchronic species (extraordinary species that has many similarities with fossil species related to it e.g. Amborella trichopoda, from an evolutionary lineage that is currently considered to be the first to have differentiated during the evolution of flowering plants, which began about 135 million years ago in the Cretaceous period), giving an overview of the vegetation that existed at the end of the Mesozoic Era. For this reason, New Caledonia has been the filming location for several documentaries about this period, including two episodes of the British series Walking with Dinosaurs.

The rainforest is the richest plant formation with species of vascular plants (ferns, conifers and flowering plants), distributed among 483 genera and 138 families. The specific endemism rate of its flora is 82.2%, and the families with the most species are, in order: Orchidaceae (169), Rubiaceae (148), Euphorbiaceae (139), Myrtaceae (129), Araliaceae (87), Apocynaceae (76), Myrsinaceae, Sapindaceae, and Cunoniaceae (approximately 50 species each). Furthermore, of the 43 conifer species present in New Caledonia, 35 are found in rainforests, as are all of the palm species (38 species). The most representative species of these environments are the kaoris (giant kaori or of the koghis and white kaori or of the North), the Araucarias (notably the columnar pine, which dominates the other trees in height and is one of the emblems of the Territory) or the tree ferns (notably Cyathea intermedia which can exceed 20m in height).

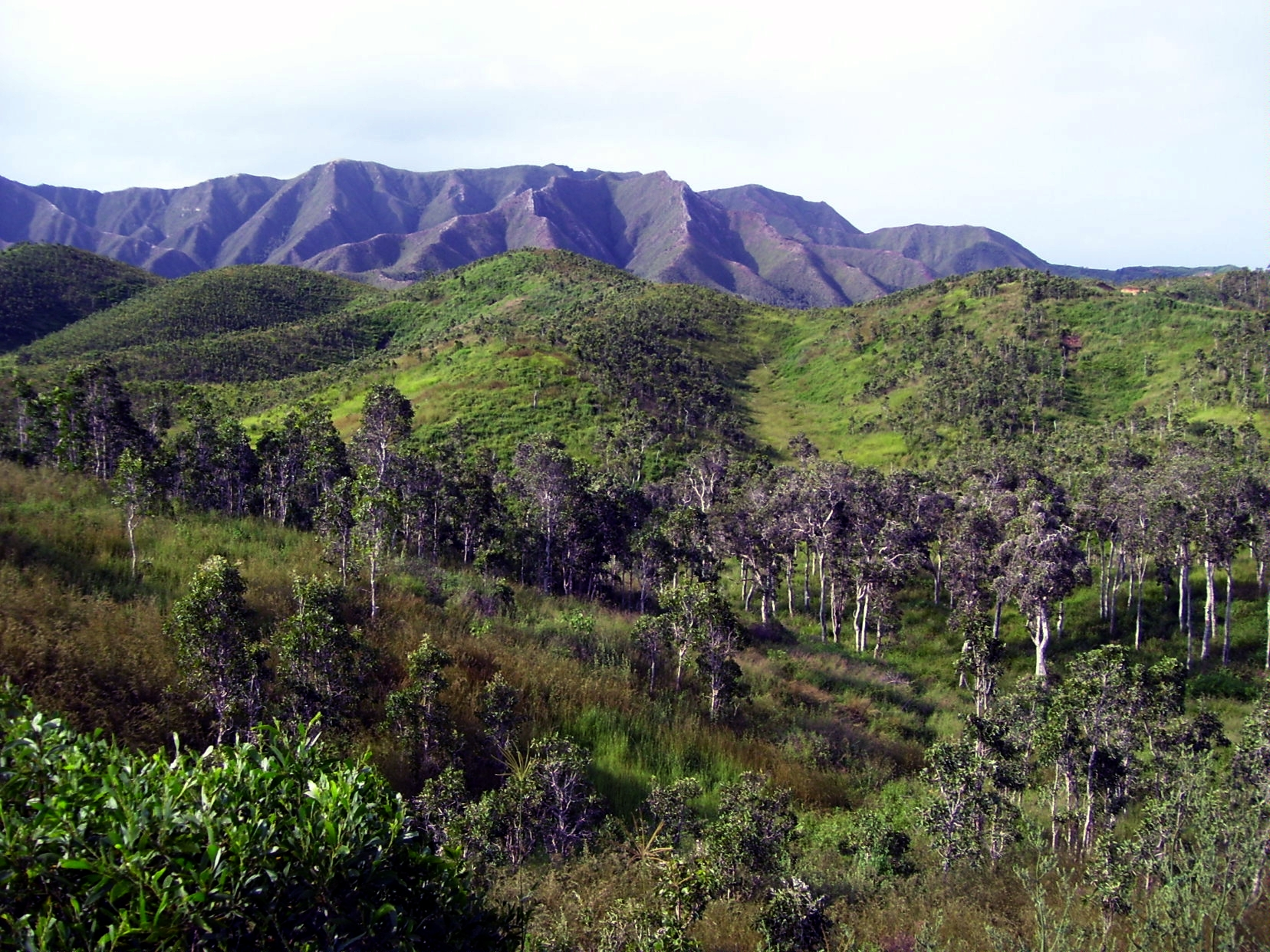
View of the Central Range and its foothills, covered in niaouli savanna, on the West Coast.

In 2008, the South Province created the Grandes Fougères Park on 4,535 hectares of mountainous land spread across the municipalities of Moindou, Farino, and Sarraméa. Its primary objective is to protect dense rainforest ecosystems, which exhibit exceptional biodiversity and endemism rates. Thus, an inventory carried out in 2009 by the French Research Institute for Development (IRD) estimates the number of plant species in the Grandes Fougères Park at nearly 500, 70% of which are endemic. The park is also home to numerous endemic bird species, including the kagu, the goliath imperial pigeon, the New Caledonian thicketbird, and the green pigeon and is included in a geographical area classified as an Important Bird Area (IBA) by BirdLife International. The protection measures implemented in the park include the fight against invasive alien species that threaten the survival of the forest. The rusa deer and the wild pig are among these species, and are therefore hunted in a section of the Grandes Fougères park which is only accessible to hunters.

There are also some mining scrubland areas in the Central Range, a biotope that develops on ultramafic rocks (4500 km², primarily in the southeast of Grande Terre, but also in the Koniambo, Boulindo, and Tiebaghi massifs). This scrubland exhibits great physiognomic diversity, with both sclerophyllous plant communities (with hard, leathery, often glossy leaves) and evergreen plants (whose foliage does not renew itself simultaneously at a specific time of year). These communities can be shrubby, more or less bushy, or ligno-herbaceous with a dense sedge layer, but they all share the common characteristic of developing on terrain that is technically unfavorable to mineral plant nutrition. They generally arise from the destruction of a forest following a fire or intensive mining operations. The specificity of its soil and its low fertility (which prevents the development of invasive introduced species that could threaten it) leads to a high degree of endemism, with more than 88% of the species present in this landscape found only in New Caledonia and whose unusual mineral nutrition conditions make it one of the most original ecosystems on the planet.

=== Hydrography ===
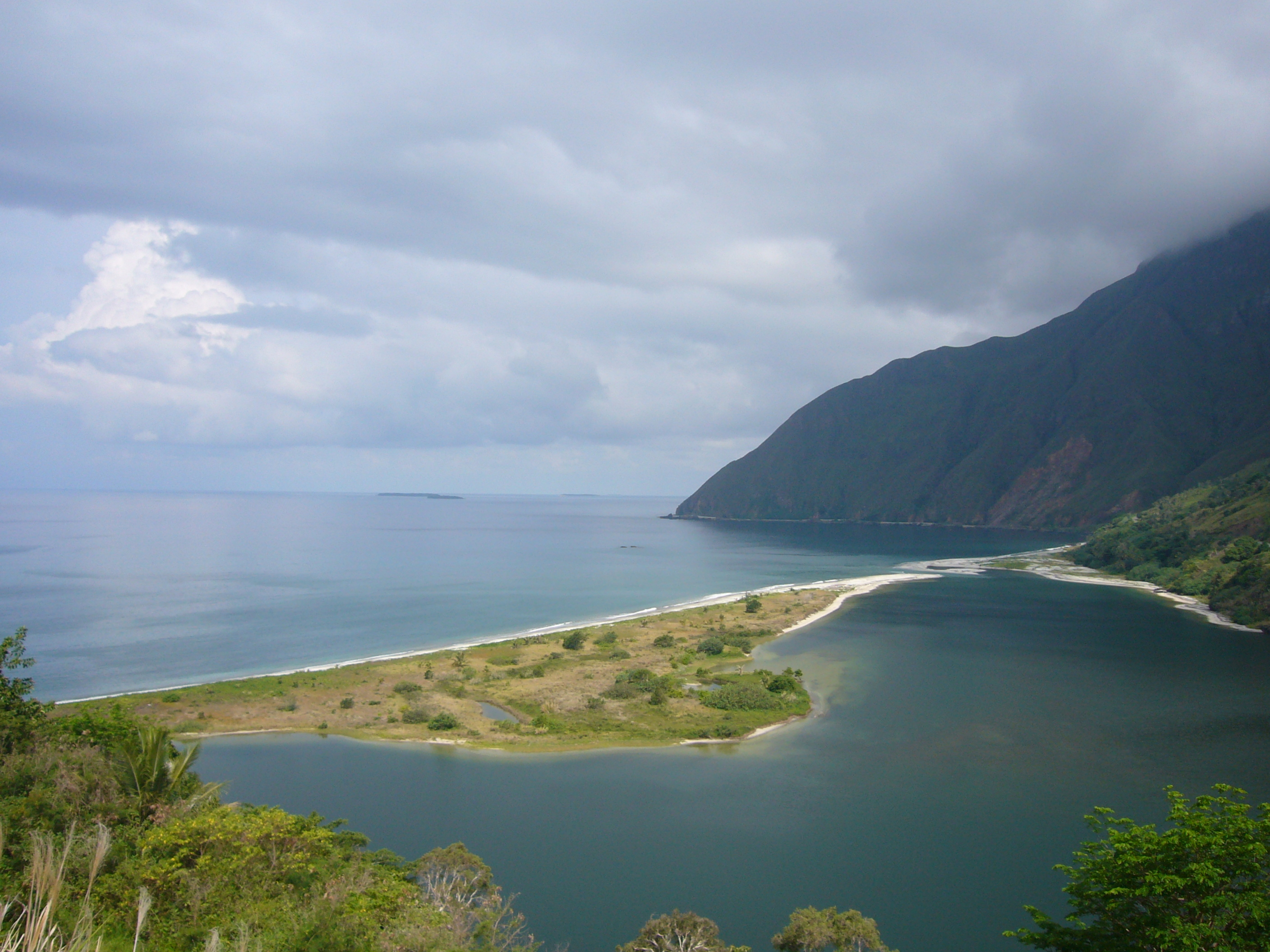
The mouth of the Ouaieme at Hienghène on the East Coast, framed by the slopes of the Central Range.

The Central Range contains and is the source of all the rivers of Grande Terre.

On the East coast, numerous coastal rivers, flowing west-east and marked by many gorges and waterfalls carve deep valleys between the mountain ranges of the Central Range: for example, those of the Ouaieme at Hienghène, the Tchamba, the Amoa, or the Tiwaka at Poindimié.

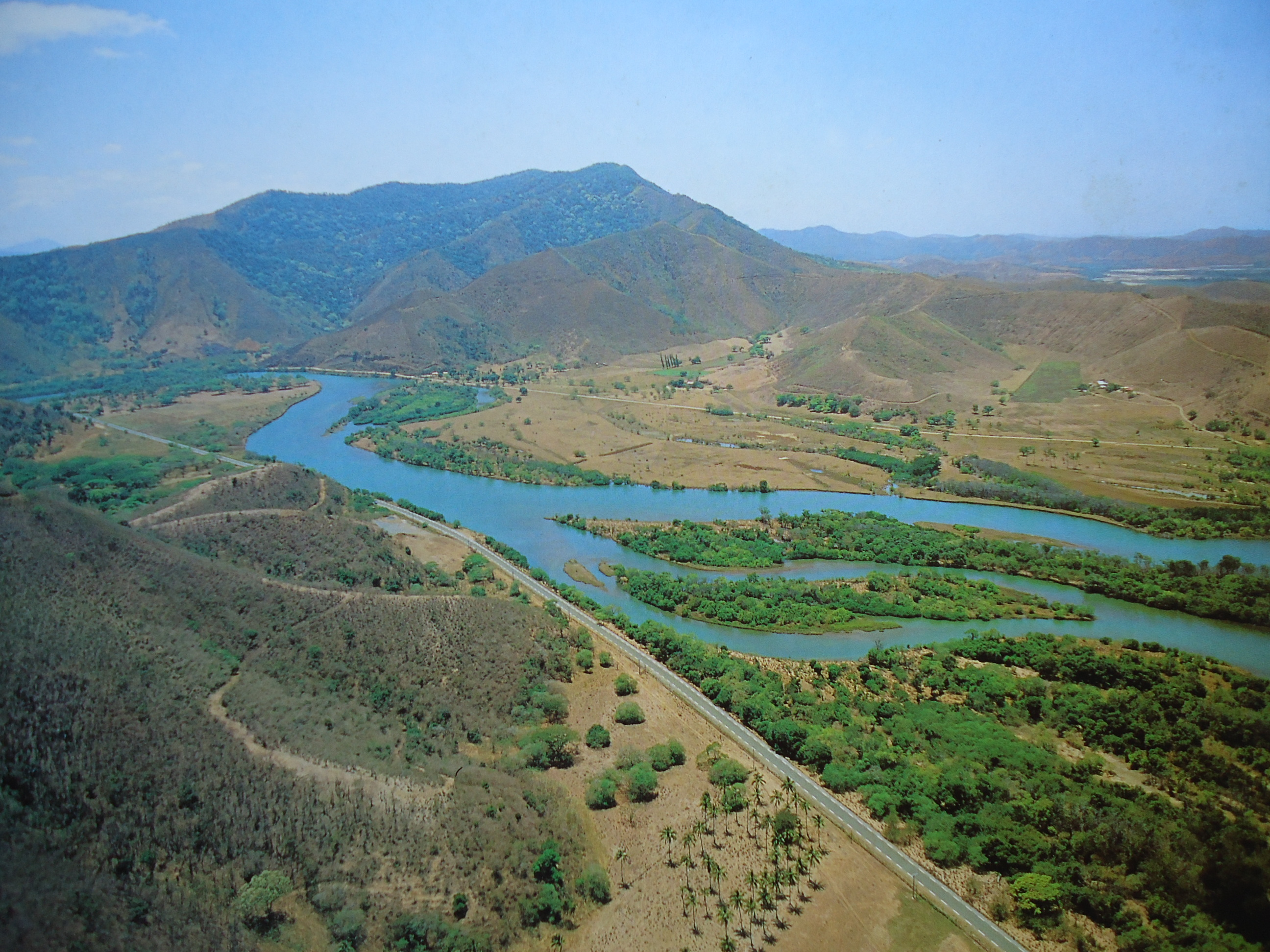
The Néra Valley, in Bourail on the West Coast.

On the West Coast, the watersheds are more developed in the plains, with rivers such as the Dumbéa, the Tontouta, the Foa, and the Néra, heavily influenced by human activities (particularly agriculture and livestock farming). The Diahot is the longest river in New Caledonia and the only one with a south-north orientation, located within the territory of the municipality of Ouégoa in the north of Grande Terre.

In the Great South, the hydrographic network becomes denser and takes on a very fragmented form, in the form of numerous water holes and creeks but also contains the Yaté with hydroelectric Yaté Dam.
