= Voh (disambiguation) =

Voh or VOH may refer to:

- Voh, a commune in the North Province of New Caledonia
- Voh River, a river of New Caledonia
- Vohemar Airport, the IATA code VOH
- Verband Österreichischer Höhlenforscher (VÖH), a national caving organization
- Diablo IV: Vessel of Hatred, expansion pack for the action role-playing dungeon crawling game Diablo IV
