= List of rivers of New Caledonia =

A list of rivers of New Caledonia:

- Amoa River
- Canala River
- Cap River
- Comboui River
- Diahot River
- Dothio River
- Dumbéa River
- Hienghène River
- Ho River
- Houaïlou River
- Karoipa River
- Koua River
- Kouakoué River
- Kouaoua River
- Koué River
- Koumac River
- Kuébéni River
- La Coulée River
- La Foa River
- Lo Uanga River
- Moindah River
- Moindou River
- Monéo River
- Mou River
- Nakéty River
- Néavin River
- Néhoué River
- Népoui River
- Néra River
- Nessadiou River
- Ngo River
- Ngoye River
- Ni River
- Nimbaye River
- Nimbo (Mba) River
- Ouaco River
- Ouaième River
- Ouango River
- Ouaméni River
- Oué Bouameu River
- Oué Pouanlotch River
- Ouenghi River
- Ouha River
- Ouinné River
- Pirogues River
- Plum River
- Poué Koué River
- Pourina River
- Poya River
- Salée River
- Taom River
- Tchamba River
- Témala River
- Thio River
- Tiaoué River
- Tinip River
- Tiwaka River
- To N'deu River
- Tontouta River
- Voh River
- Yaté River
