= MOU =

MOU, MoU, Mou or mou may refer to:

== Places ==
- Mou, Burkina Faso, a town
- Mou, Denmark, a small town in Aalborg Municipality, Denmark
- MOU Box, a fisheries management area in the Timor Sea
- Mou Forest, Burkina Faso
- Mou River, New Caledonia

== People ==
=== As a surname ===
- Mou (surname), a Chinese surname
- Erica Mou (born 1990), Italian singer and musician
- Mou Zongsan (1909–1995), Chinese New Confucian philosopher

=== As a nickname ===
- José Mourinho, Portuguese football manager, nicknamed "Mou"

== Other uses ==
- Memorandum of understanding, MOU or MoU, a type of agreement between two or more parties
- The MoU aimed at ending the 2026 Iran war
- MOU, ISO 639 code for the Mogum language spoken in Chad
- MoU, an abbreviation for Modern Ukrainian, the period of the Ukrainian language beginning at the very end of the 18th century
- Mou boots, footwear company
- Mu (unit), a Chinese area unit also spelled mou, approximately 0.066 hectares.
