= Amoa =

Amoa may refer to:

== People ==
=== Surname ===
- Kofi Amoa-Abban, Ghanaian Oil and Gas entrepreneur
- Kwaku Amoa-Awuah (1926–2015), Ghanaian politician
- Basilea Amoa-Tetteh (born 1984), Ghanaian women's international footballer

=== Given name ===
- Amoa Tausilia (born 1922), Western Samoan former chief and politician

== Other uses ==
- Amoa River, a river in northeastern New Caledonia
- Ammonia monooxygenase (AmoA), an enzyme
- Amusement & Music Operators Association (AMOA), a trade organization for the United States' licensed jukebox owners
