= Blue River Provincial Park =

Nature reserve in New Caledonia

- Parc provincial de la Rivière Bleue
- View of Yaté Lake

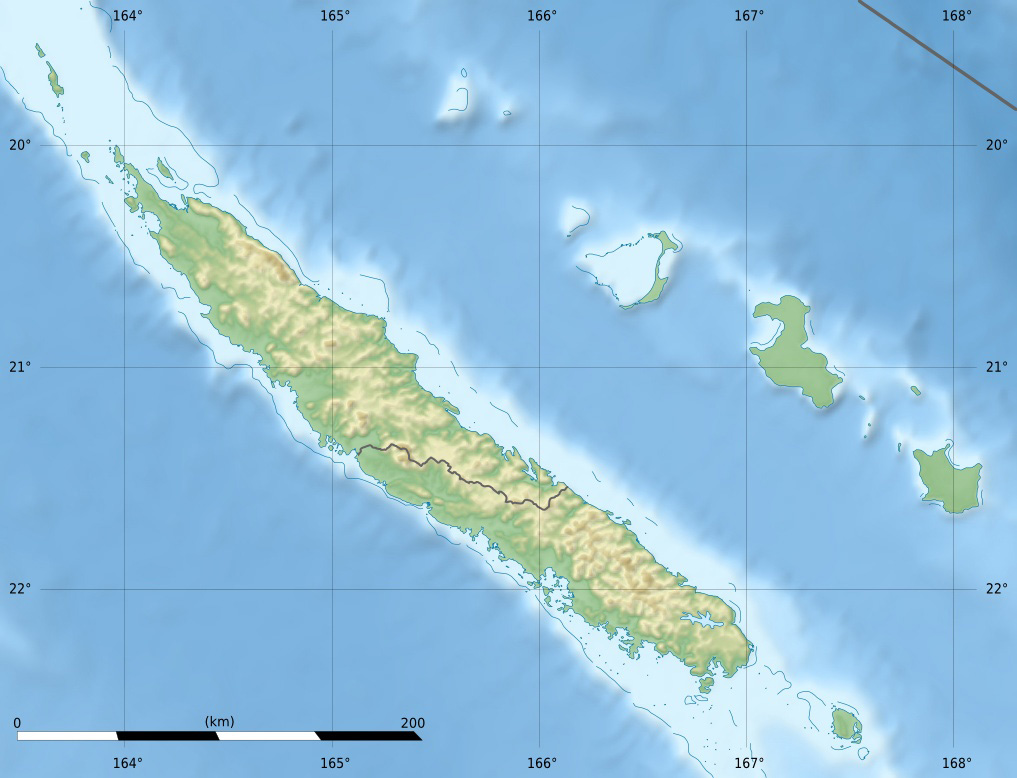
- Location within New Caledonia
- Location: Yaté Commune, South Province, New Caledonia
- Nearest town: Nouméa, New Caledonia
- Coordinates: 22°06′32″S 166°39′36″E
- Area: 22,000 ha (85 sq mi)
- Max. elevation: 1,250 m (4,100 ft)
- Min. elevation: 160 m (520 ft)
- Established: 1980
- Administrator: South Province Administration Center (CAPS)
- Website: Blue River Provincial Park

The Blue River Provincial Park (French: Parc provincial de la Rivière Bleue) is a nature reserve in Yaté Commune, South Province, New Caledonia.

== Geography ==
The 22,000 ha (54,000 acres) Blue River Provincial Park is part of the larger 15,900 ha (39,000 acres) Upper Yaté fauna reserve. The Park covers the basins of the Blue, White, and Month of May Rivers, the latter two of which have drained into Yaté Lake since the construction of the Yaté Dam in 1958. Part of the banks and the length of the lake are in the park, including a large drowned forest. The altitude varies from 160–1,250 m (520–4,100 ft).

The hydrography and the nature of the terrain lead to the presence of several waterfalls, water holes, and giant's kettle in the Blue River valley.

== Biodiversity ==
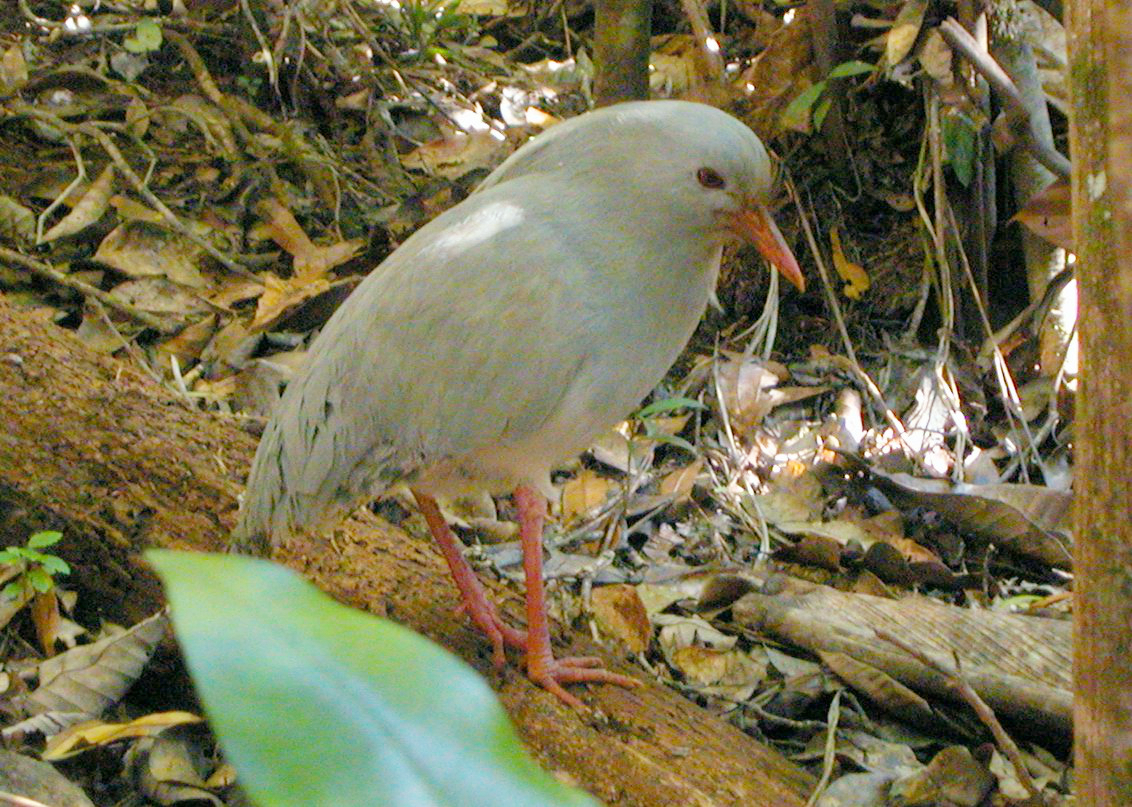
A kagu in the park

The park includes two biomes typical of New Caledonia: maquis shrubland overlying peridotite rock and tropical rainforest. There is a very high rate of biodiversity of New Caledonia. In particular, the park is known for being one of the last areas where the kagu, an endangered bird which has become a symbol of the country, can be seen in its natural habitat, with a population of about 700; this is the largest single population of the species in the wild. Other endemic and rare animals in the park include the crow honeyeater, notou, New Caledonian crow, and crested gecko.

The park contains a thousand-year-old, forty-metre-tall giant Agathis lanceolata tree, one of the largest known in New Caledonia. There are also wild carnivorous plants (Drosera neocaledonica and Nepenthes vieillardii) and orchids.

== History ==
Human settlement in the park is prehistoric; petroglyphs can be found in the Blue River valley. At the beginning of the twentieth century, forestry and chrome mining led to the development of modern transport infrastructure, much of which is still in place; there are still 36km of railways for transporting logs and ore, a traction engine winch and the Pérignon bridge, made of local wood, which crosses the branch of the lake created in the White River in 1958. The construction of the Yaté Dam the same year made major changes to the terrain. The park was founded in 1980 and came under the responsibility of the South Province when the provinces of New Caledonia were created in 1989.

== Recreation and tourist infrastructure ==
The South Province initiated the development of the park in 1998 in response to increasing visitor numbers with the goals of protecting nature, educating visitors about the environment and of further attracting tourists. A "Maison du Parc" was thus inaugurated in 2002 at the main entrance, with an exhibition hall (containing a permanent display about the park since June 2003), a library, a conference room, a shop, archives, and storage rooms. Areas set up for camping and picnics were set up along the rivers, as well as a network of walking and cycling trails.

== See also ==
- Biodiversity of New Caledonia
- Tourism in New Caledonia
