= Les Nouvelles Calédoniennes =

Daily, French-language newspaper

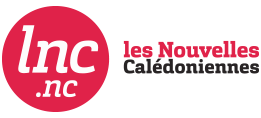
- Type: Daily newspaper
- Format: Tabloid
- Owner: Holdennha
- Founded: June 15, 1971; 55 years ago
- Ceased publication: March 16, 2023 restarted 2 Oct 2023
- Language: French
- Country: New Caledonia
- ISSN: 1148-0319
- Website: lnc.nc

Les Nouvelles Calédoniennes (French pronunciation: [le nuvɛl kaledɔnjɛn], The Caledonian News) is a daily, French-language newspaper published in New Caledonia since June 15, 1971. New Caledonia's only daily publication, the newspaper does not publish a Sunday edition. Les Nouvelles Calédoniennes was owned by Groupe Hersant Média until 2013, when Caledonian private investors took ownership. Since these were businesspeople like Jacques Jeandot with links to pro-France politicians, some concerns were raised about journalistic integrity, but the newspaper had already adopted a neutral political stance in the years prior.

After two challenging years it ceased production on 16 March 2023, citing the difficulties of maintaining profitability, mothballed its website and laid off its staff, but by 2 October 2023 it was back as an online only publication, using a subscription model as before. The reason was a purchase by Holdennha, part of the Dang group run by Jean-Piere Dang, founded by businessman and occasional political actor André Dang Van Nha.
