= Tio =

Tio may refer to:

- Tio (Zatch Bell!) a character from the Zatch Bell!, a Japanese manga series
- T'í'o, a.k.a. "Tiyo", a city in Eritrea
- Tio, Burkina Faso, a town in Burkina Faso
- Tió de Nadal, a character in Catalan mythology
- TiO, the chemical formula for titanium(II) oxide
- "TiO" (Zayn song), 2016
- Celina Tio, American chef
- Elkan William Tio Baggott, Indonesia professional football player
- Tio Salamanca, a fictional character in Breaking Bad and Better Call Saul
- Tio Pakusadewo, Indonesian actor
- Tio people, an ethnic group in Republic of Congo
  - Tio Kingdom, a precolonial state

== See also ==
- Thio (disambiguation)
