= Moneo (disambiguation) =

Moneo is a French debit card system.

Moneo may also refer to:

- José Rafael Moneo, a Spanish architect
- Moneo Atreides, a fictional character in the 1981 novel God Emperor of Dune
- The Monéo River, in New Caledonia

== See also ==
- Moneoa Moshesh (born 1989), a South African singer and actress
