= Pterostylis bureaviana =

Scientific classification
- Kingdom: Plantae
- Clade: Tracheophytes
- Clade: Angiosperms
- Clade: Monocots
- Order: Asparagales
- Family: Orchidaceae
- Subfamily: Orchidoideae
- Tribe: Cranichideae
- Genus: Pterostylis
- Species: P. bureaviana

Binomial name
- Pterostylis bureaviana Schltr.

Synonyms
- Pterostylis affinis Guillaumin

Species of orchid

Pterostylis bureaviana is a plant in the orchid family Orchidaceae and is endemic to New Caledonia. It was first formally described in 1906 by Rudolf Schlechter from a specimen collected on mountains near Païta and the description was published in the journal Botanische Jahrbücher für Systematik, Pflanzengeschichte und Pflanzengeographie. This greenhood orchid is found between Yaté and the Massif de Tchingou, growing in rainforest and dense humid forest, often in Nothofagus leaf litter.
