= Ni River (New Caledonia) =

Coordinates: 21.8752°S 166.5679°E

Location
- Country: New Caledonia

The Ni River is a river of New Caledonia. It has a catchment area of 173 square kilometres.

== See also ==
- List of rivers of New Caledonia
