= Kouakoué River =

River of New Caledonia

Coordinates: 21.929°S 166.594°E

The Kouakoué River is a river of New Caledonia. It has a catchment area of 77 square kilometres.

== See also ==
- List of rivers of New Caledonia
