= Comboui River =

River in New Caledonia

Coordinates: 21.8748°S 166.5669°E

The Comboui River is a river of New Caledonia. It has a catchment area of 180 square kilometres.

== See also ==
- List of rivers of New Caledonia
