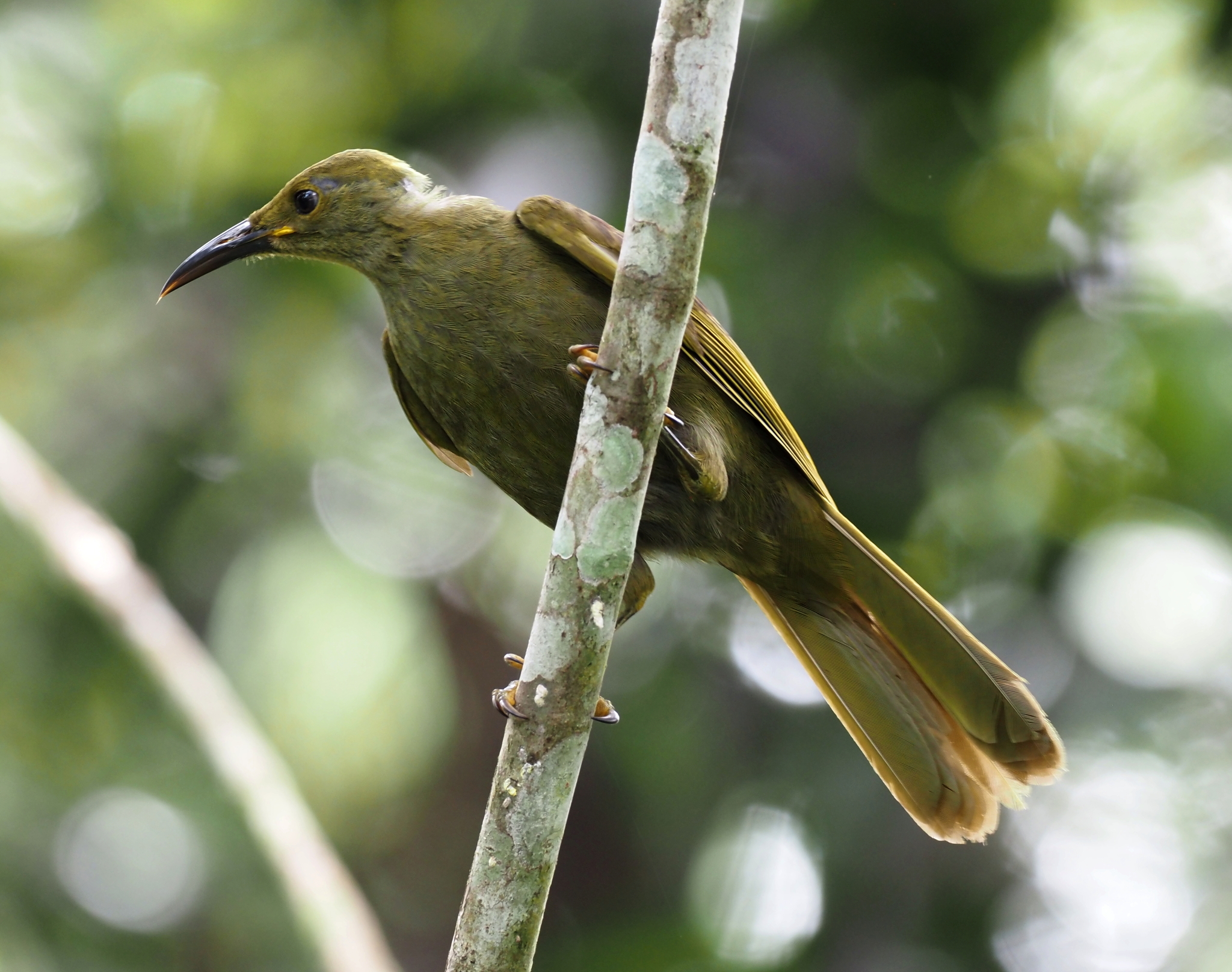

Conservation status
- Least Concern (IUCN 3.1)

Scientific classification
- Kingdom: Animalia
- Phylum: Chordata
- Class: Aves
- Order: Passeriformes
- Family: Meliphagidae
- Genus: Gymnomyza
- Species: G. brunneirostris

Binomial name
- Gymnomyza brunneirostris (Mayr, 1932)

= Duetting giant honeyeater =

Species of bird

The duetting giant honeyeater (Gymnomyza brunneirostris), formerly known as the giant honeyeater, is a species of bird in the family Meliphagidae. It is endemic to Fiji.

Its natural habitats are subtropical or tropical moist lowland forest, and subtropical or tropical moist montane forest. It is threatened by habitat loss.

It is endemic Viti Levu island. It was formerly considered conspecific with the yellow-billed giant honeyeater. Both showed phenotypic and behavioural differences. A molecular phylogenetic study published in 2014 found that they also differed significantly in their mitochondrial DNA sequences and suggested that G. v. brunneirostris should be promoted to the species level. The International Ornithologists' Union accepted these proposals and introduced the name "yellow-billed giant honeyeater" for G. viridis and "duetting giant honeyeater" for G. brunneirostris.
