= Kouaoua River =

River of New Caledonia

Coordinates: 21.477°S 165.789°E

The Kouaoua River is a river of New Caledonia. It has a catchment area of 253 square kilometres (98 sq mi). At least one bridge and one set of electric conductors crosses the river. The river is a significant part of the local mining industry, particularly for the extraction of nickel, which is crucial to the region's economy. Environmental concerns have arisen due to the impact of mining activities on the river's ecosystem and water quality, highlighting conflicts between economic benefits and environmental sustainability.

== See also ==
- List of rivers of New Caledonia
