= Nessadiou River =

River of New Caledonia

Coordinates: 21.612°S 165.552°E

The Nessadiou River is a river of New Caledonia. It has a catchment area of 87 square kilometres.

== See also ==
- List of rivers of New Caledonia
