= Taom River =

River of New Caledonia

Coordinates: 20.818°S 164.496°E

The Taom River is a river of New Caledonia. It has a catchment area of 105 square kilometres.

== See also ==
- List of rivers of New Caledonia
