= Ouenghi River =

River of New Caledonia

Coordinates: 21°55′45″S 166°6′35″E

The Ouenghi River is a river of New Caledonia. It has a catchment area of 270 square kilometres. Bouloupais lies near the river at the foot of Mount Ouitchambo. It enters the Saint Vincent Bay to the west of the village of Tomo.

== See also ==
- List of rivers of New Caledonia
