= Nimbo (Mba) River =

River of New Caledonia

Coordinates: 21°44′S 166°26′E

The Nimbo (Mba) River is a river of New Caledonia. It has a catchment area of 85 square kilometres.

== See also ==
- List of rivers of New Caledonia
