= Cap River =

River of New Caledonia

Coordinates: 21.5205°S 165.2599°E

The Cap River is a river of New Caledonia. It has a catchment area of 174 square kilometres.

== See also ==
- List of rivers of New Caledonia
