= Dothio River =

River in New Caledonia, France

Coordinates: 21.6010°S 166.2296°E

The Dothio River is a river of New Caledonia. It has a catchment area of 77 km^{2} (30 mi^{2}).

== See also ==
- List of rivers of New Caledonia
