= Houaïlou River =

River of New Caledonia

Coordinates: 21.288°S 165.52°E

The Houaïlou River is a river of New Caledonia. It has a catchment area of 539 square kilometres.

== See also ==
- List of rivers of New Caledonia
