= To N'deu River =

River in New Caledonia, France

The To N'deu River is a river of New Caledonia. It has a catchment area of 72 square kilometres.

== See also ==
- List of rivers of New Caledonia
