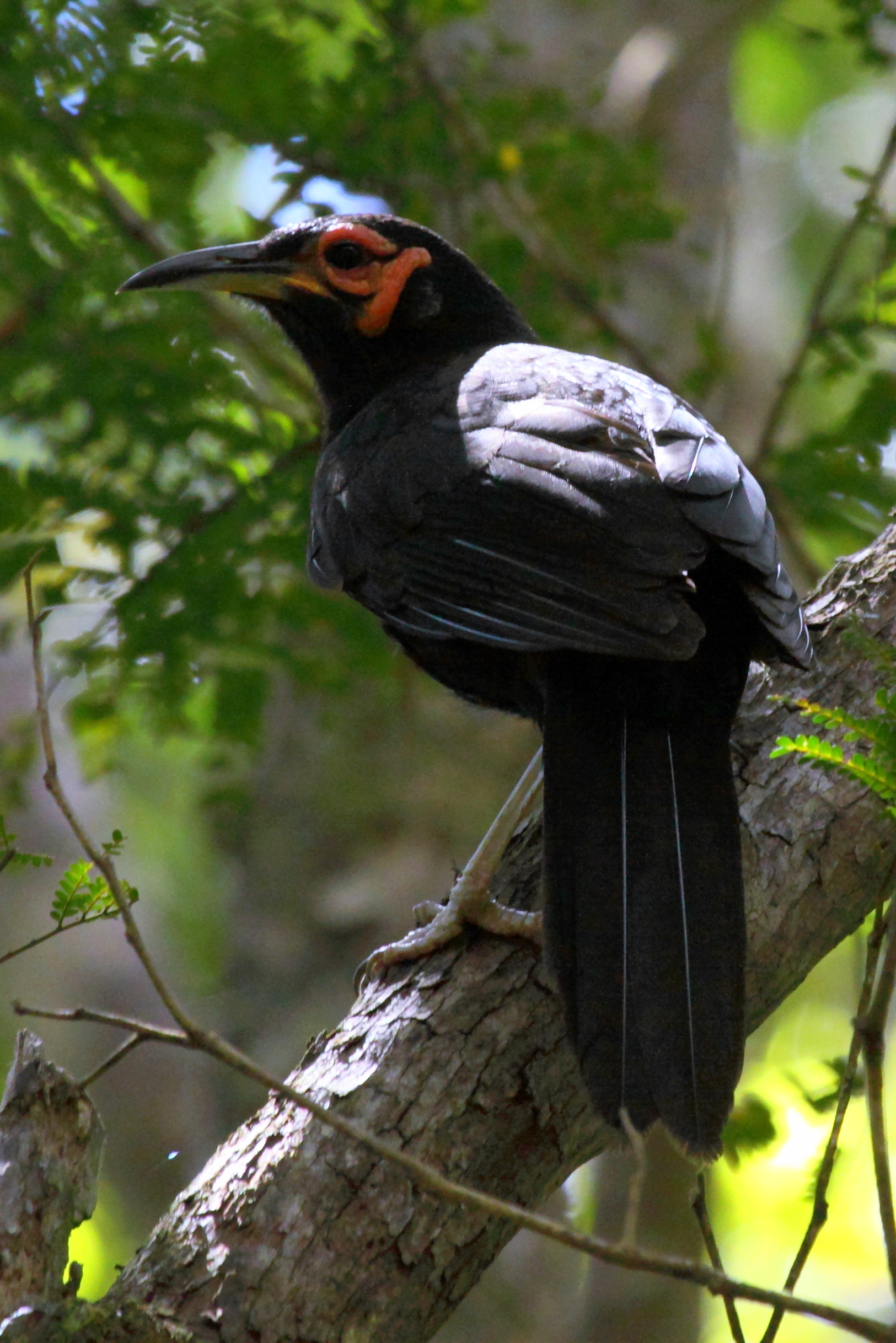

Conservation status
- Critically Endangered (IUCN 3.1)

Scientific classification
- Kingdom: Animalia
- Phylum: Chordata
- Class: Aves
- Order: Passeriformes
- Family: Meliphagidae
- Genus: Gymnomyza
- Species: G. aubryana

Binomial name
- Gymnomyza aubryana (Verreaux & Des Murs, 1860)

= Crow honeyeater =

Species of bird

The crow honeyeater (Gymnomyza aubryana) is a very large honeyeater endemic to humid forests in New Caledonia in the South Pacific.

== Description ==
The species measures 35 to 42.5 cm (13.8–16.7 in). It has orange facial wattles. It superficially resembles a crow with its glossy black plumage and a curved beak. Crow honeyeaters have long rounded wings and a long tail and neck. Their bill is long and bicolored – yellow below, black above. It has a loud, ringing call, which is predominantly heard in the early mornings. Crow honeyeaters are monogamous.

== Habits and range ==
It is relatively inconspicuous, and lives either in pairs or alone. It forages for invertebrates and nectar in the canopy and midstory.

== Status and conservation ==
This bird is critically endangered due to introduced rats. Extensive surveys have only found it in the Parc de la Rivière Bleue area, on the slopes of the Kouakoué, in the Pourina and Ouiné valleys, at Rivière Blanche and on the slopes of Mont Pouédihi and Mt Panie. It is spread throughout the island, though mostly in the south. It is estimated that there are between 50 and 249 birds left.
