= Oué Pouanlotch River =

River of New Caledonia

Coordinates: 20.853°S 164.619°E

Interactive Map

The Oué Pouanlotch River is a river of New Caledonia. It has a catchment area of 92 square kilometres.

The surrounding area is that of tropical rain forest.

== See also ==
- List of rivers of New Caledonia
