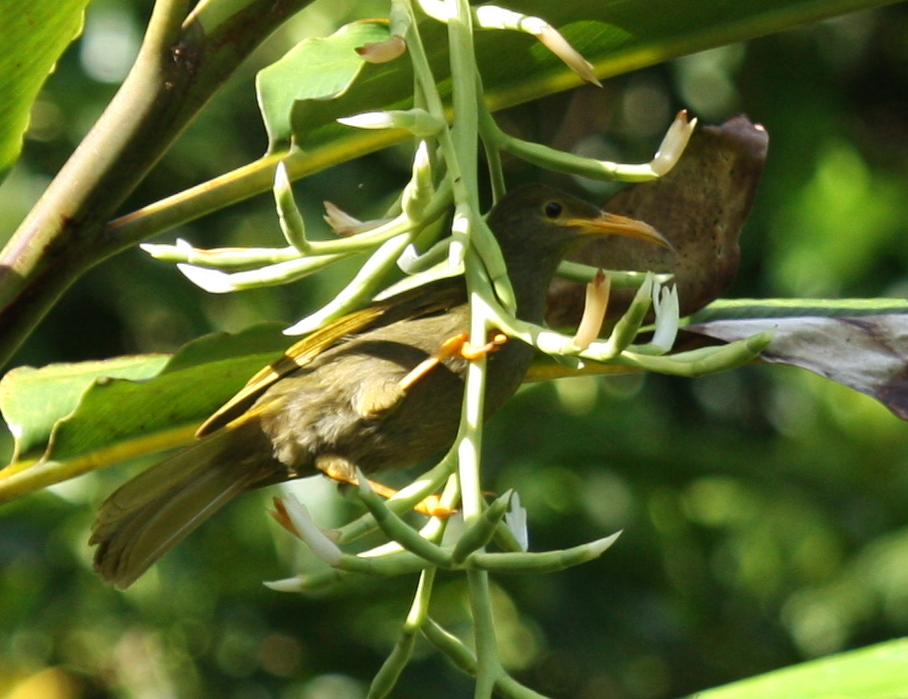
- Yellow-billed giant honeyeater (Gymnomyza viridis)

Scientific classification
- Kingdom: Animalia
- Phylum: Chordata
- Class: Aves
- Order: Passeriformes
- Family: Meliphagidae
- Genus: Gymnomyza; Reichenow, 1914

Type species
- Leptornis aubryanus J. Verreaux & Des Murs, 1860

Species
- Gymnomyza aubryana; Gymnomyza samoensis; Gymnomyza viridis; Gymnomyza brunneirostris

= Gymnomyza =

Genus of birds

Gymnomyza is a genus of birds, in the honeyeater family Meliphagidae, which are restricted to a few islands in the southwest Pacific Ocean.

The genus contains four species:

Image	Scientific name	Common name
	Gymnomyza aubryana	Crow honeyeater
	Gymnomyza samoensis	Mao
	Gymnomyza viridis	Yellow-billed giant honeyeater
	Gymnomyza brunneirostris	Duetting giant honeyeater
