= Ngo River =

River in New Caledonia

Coordinates: 22.3097°S 166.7025°E

The Ngo River or La Ngo, is a river of New Caledonia. It is a stream which flows into Ngo Bay.

== See also ==
- List of rivers of New Caledonia
