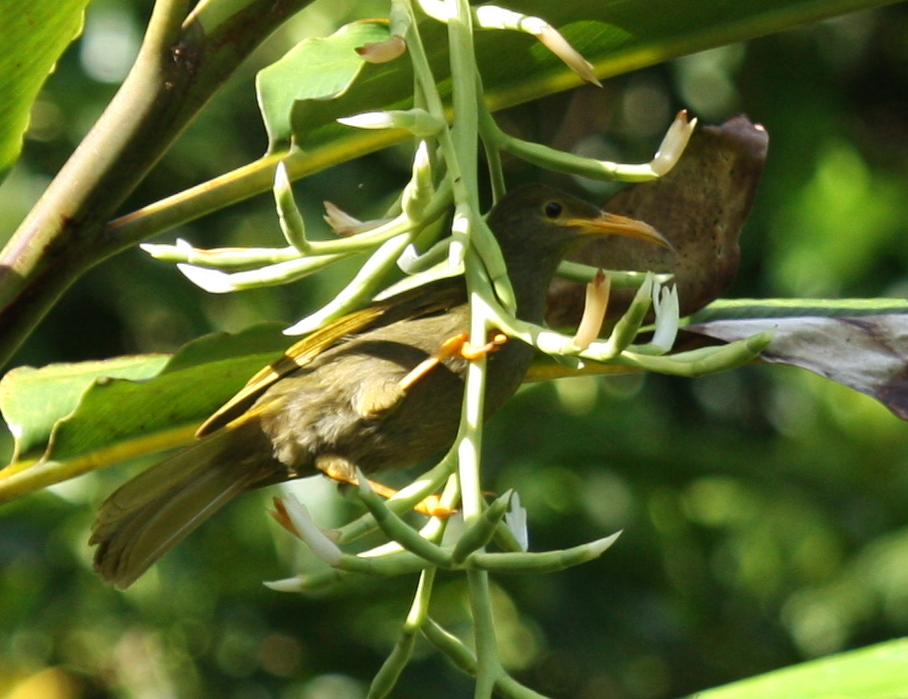

Conservation status
- Least Concern (IUCN 3.1)

Scientific classification
- Kingdom: Animalia
- Phylum: Chordata
- Class: Aves
- Order: Passeriformes
- Family: Meliphagidae
- Genus: Gymnomyza
- Species: G. viridis

Binomial name
- Gymnomyza viridis (Layard, 1875)

= Yellow-billed giant honeyeater =

Species of bird

The yellow-billed giant honeyeater (Gymnomyza viridis), also known as yellow-billed honeyeater, yodeling giant honeyeater, the chattering giant honeyeater, is a species of bird in the family Meliphagidae. It is endemic to Fiji.

Its natural habitats are subtropical or tropical moist lowland forest, and subtropical or tropical moist montane forest. It is threatened by habitat loss.

It occurs on the Vanua Levu and Taveuni islands. It was considered conspecific with the giant honeyeater, although they showed both phenotypic and behavioural differences. A molecular phylogenetic study published in 2014 found that they also differed significantly in their mitochondrial DNA sequences and suggested that G. v. brunneirostris should be promoted to the species level. The International Ornithologists' Union accepted these proposals and introduced the name "yellow-billed giant honeyeater" for G. viridis and "duetting giant honeyeater" for G. brunneirostris.
