= Ouha River =

River in New Caledonia

The Ouha River is a river in New Caledonia. It has a catchment area of 84 square kilometres.

== See also ==
- List of rivers of New Caledonia
