= Moindou River =

River of New Caledonia

Coordinates: 21.668°S 165.712°E

The Moindou River is a river of New Caledonia. It has a catchment area of 125 square kilometres.

== See also ==
- List of rivers of New Caledonia
