= Lo Uanga River =

River in New Caledonia, France

Coordinates: 20.7074°S 164.3748°E

The Iouanga River is a river of New Caledonia. It has a catchment area of 522 square kilometres.

== See also ==
- List of rivers of New Caledonia
