= Inaccessible Bay =

Bay in New Caledonia, France

Coordinates: 22°3′12″S 166°8′45″E

Inaccessible Bay or Baie Inaccessible is a bay in southwestern New Caledonia. It is known as "Inaccessible" because a narrow peninsula partly prevents access to the inner bay known as Saint Vincent Bay.
