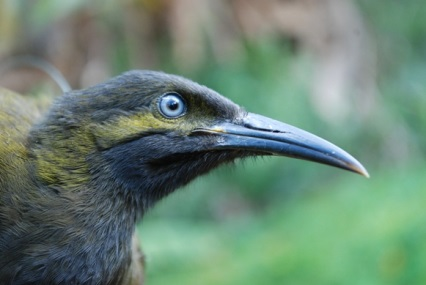

Conservation status
- Endangered (IUCN 3.1)

Scientific classification
- Kingdom: Animalia
- Phylum: Chordata
- Class: Aves
- Order: Passeriformes
- Family: Meliphagidae
- Genus: Gymnomyza
- Species: G. samoensis

Binomial name
- Gymnomyza samoensis (Hombron & Jacquinot, 1841)

= Mao (bird) =

Mao or maʻomaʻo

Species of birds

The mao or maʻomaʻo (Gymnomyza samoensis) is a passerine bird belonging to the genus Gymnomyza in the honeyeater family Meliphagidae. It is an endangered species and is endemic to the Samoan Islands.

It is a large honeyeater, 28–31 cm (11–12 in) long. The plumage is dark, varying from blackish on the head and breast to olive-green on the wings and body. There is a dark greenish mark under the eye. The bill is long, curved and black in an adult and yellowish in a chick or juvenile and the legs and feet are also black. Adult birds have light blue or brown eyes whilst all juveniles have a brown iris. It characteristically bobs its tail while foraging along the trunk and branches of trees.

Nests are built at varying heights in the branches of many different tree species. A single whitish brown speckled egg is laid in a simple sticky cup nest. The single chick is in the nest for approximately 1 month prior to fledging. During this time it is fed both small vertebrates, such as geckos, and insects. After leaving the nest the juvenile remains in the core breeding territory where it is fed by the female for 2–2.5 additional months. During this time it follows the female making loud begging calls.

The mao makes loud whistling and mewing calls, most often prior to dawn and around dusk. A breeding pair also engage in complex duets.

It is found on the islands of Upolu and Savai'i and formerly occurred also on Tutuila but is now locally extinct in the latter. It normally inhabits mountain forest but has also been recorded in scrub and coastal coconut trees. The population, which numbers between 250 and 999 birds, is thought to be declining. It is threatened by destruction of the forest and the spread of introduced predators such as rats.

In December 2014, the United States Fish and Wildlife Service announced the maʻomaʻo as a candidate for ESA protection, describing the species as "a large, dusky olive-green honeyeater native to Upolu and Savaii, Independent Samoa (Samoa), and Tutuila Island, American Samoa, but now only found in small populations on the islands of Savaii and Upolu."
