= André Dang Van Nha =

Vietnamese-French-Australian mining magnate (born 1936)

- Born: André Đặng Văn Nha; 27 July 1936 (age 89); Voh, New Caledonia
- Citizenship: France; Vietnam; Australia
- Occupation: Businessman
- Spouse: Bui Thi En (m. 1954)
- Children: 4

André Dang Van Nha (Vietnamese: André Đặng Văn Nha; born 27 July 1936) is a French-Australian businessman and mining magnate in New Caledonia. He is best known for brokering a series of mining deals that also supported the Kanak cause for independence from France.

== Early life ==
André Dang Van Nha was born into poverty to mother Nguyễn Thị Bình and father Đặng Văn Nha. His mother was a Vietnamese woman from French Indochina, who left behind her three children to relocate to New Caledonia as an indentured labourer in 1935, working on nickel mines in and around the Koniambo mine near the town of Voh. The mine hosted many Vietnamese indentured labourers, referred to as the Chân Dăng, who were treated harshly. She met André Dang Van Nha's father at the mine, who later died in an industrial accident in 1937. André Dang Van Nha's parents were unmarried, as they were married to others in Vietnam, and his family thus received none of his father's pension following his death; instead, his mother was relocated to harsher labour on a chromium mine near Koumac, where Dang Van Nha was cared for by other Vietnamese migrants while she worked.

Due to his mother's work hours, Dang Van Nha was eventually adopted by a modest Vietnamese couple and relocated to live with them in Nouméa. With the establishment of Naval Base Noumea amidst World War II, Dang Van Nha was introduced to several members of the United States Marine Corps, through whom he learned English. Dang Van Nha was educated in Nouméa at Sacré Cœur and then Frédéric Surleu public schools. By 1949, his mother had finished her indentured labour contract and relocated to Nouméa as well, and Dang Van Nha was reunited with her along with two younger siblings. He began his career working as a mechanic, married Bui Thi En in 1954, and then found a job working at the Doniambo nickel smelter. He and his wife had four children together. Dang Van Nha ultimately pursued a degree in engineering in Marseille in the late 1950s, and also became a French citizen.

== Business activities ==
In 1961, after finishing his education in metropolitan France, Dang Van Nha returned to Nouméa to co-manage a Citroën automobile dealership. He later began managing his own Toyota important business and a petrol station. His early business career was impacted by racism, as he was left to compete with business-owners of predominantly European descent who sought to protect their community's monopoly over New Caledonian businesses. The Vietnamese in particular faced increased hostility, and a majority of New Caledonia's Vietnamese community returned to Vietnam during the Vietnam War.

In the 1970s, Dang Van Nha met and befriended Jean-Marie Tjibaou, a Kanak and a leader in the Kanak independence movement. Despite never becoming a participant in the independence movement, Dang Van Nha became increasingly aligned with Kanak independence, and eventually was forced to flee to Australia in the 1980s after being falsely accused of financially supporting the independence movement. While in Australia, his petrol station was subjected to an arson attack; Dang Van Nha soon settled in Kellyville, New South Wales, where he began new businesses in Australia and became an Australian citizen. After the signing of the Matignon Agreements in 1988, Dang Van Nha returned to New Caledonia and became the director of the Société minière du sud Pacifique (SMSP), which had recently been sold by Jacques Lafleur to the Kanak-controlled SOFINOR operation as a gesture of political reconciliation.

As the director of SMSP, Dang Van Nha was successful in helping the company avoid bankruptcy, and by 1995, it became one of New Caledonia's biggest nickel exporters. In 2008, the company opened a nickel smelter in South Korea and later launched the Koniambo Massif project. The brokering of this deal by Dang Van Nha and others in the Bercy Agreements of 1998 was significant in New Caledonia, involving a swap of mining titles with other nickel mines, political interventions, and bargaining to provide the Kanak north of the island with its own economic powerhouse and employment opportunity.

Dang Van Nha is regarded as a somewhat mysterious figure in New Caledonia, and a biography published in 2008, Mystère Dang, sheds some light on his rags-to-riches story and political leanings.
