= Néhoué River =

River of New Caledonia

Coordinates: 20.408°S 164.211°E

The Néhoué River is a river of New Caledonia. It has a catchment area of 229 square kilometres.

== See also ==
- List of rivers of New Caledonia
