= Plum, New Caledonia =

Plum
- Village
- Location in New Caledonia
- Coordinates: 22°16′22″S 166°38′6″E
- Country: France
- Overseas Territory: New Caledonia
- Commune: Le Mont-Dore

Plum is a coastal village in the commune of Le Mont-Dore on the southwest coast of New Caledonia, just north of Pirogues Bay. The Plum River empties into the sea near the western part of the village and lucky Creek flows into the sea to the southeast. Important chrome discoveries were made in the area in the late 19th century.
