= Koumac River =

River of New Caledonia

Coordinates: 20.532°S 164.361°E

The Koumac River is a river of New Caledonia. It has a catchment area of 258 square kilometres.

== See also ==
- List of rivers of New Caledonia
