= Oué Bouameu River =

River of New Caledonia

The Oué Bouameu River is a river of New Caledonia. It has a catchment area of 13 square kilometres.

== See also ==
- List of rivers of New Caledonia
