= Koué River =

River of New Caledonia

The Koué River is a river of New Caledonia. It has a catchment area of 150 square kilometres. Arillastrum are found in the river valley.

== See also ==
- List of rivers of New Caledonia
