= Canala River =

River of New Caledonia

Coordinates: 21.529°S 165.928°E

The Canala River is a river of New Caledonia. It has a catchment area of 290 square kilometres, or 203 miles.

== See also ==
- List of rivers of New Caledonia
