= Néavin River =

River of New Caledonia

Coordinates: 21.16°S 165.473°E

The Néavin River is a river of New Caledonia. Along with the Monéo River it has a combined catchment area of 202 square kilometres.

== See also ==
- List of rivers of New Caledonia
