= Moindah River =

River of New Caledonia

Coordinates: 21.411°S 165.227°E

The Moindah River is a river of New Caledonia. It has a catchment area of 165 square kilometres.

== See also ==
- List of rivers of New Caledonia
