= Ouaco River =

River in New Caledonia, France

Coordinates: 21.9005°S 166.0401°E

The Ouaco River is a river of New Caledonia. It has a catchment area of 35 square kilometres.

== See also ==
- List of rivers of New Caledonia
