= Ouaméni River =

River of New Caledonia

Coordinates: 21.9133°S 166.0290°E

The Ouaméni River is a river of New Caledonia. It has a catchment area of 175 square kilometres.

== See also ==
- List of rivers of New Caledonia
