= Gouaro Bay =

Bay in southwestern New Caledonia

Coordinates: 21°36′43″S 165°26′58″E

Gouaro Bay or Baie Gouaro is a bay in southwestern New Caledonia. It lies northwest of Moindou Bay. The settlements of Gouaro and La Roche Percee lie on the bay and the Néra River empties into it on its eastern side.
