= La Coulée River =

River of New Caledonia

Coordinates: 22.215°S 166.6°E

The La Coulée River is a river of New Caledonia. It has a catchment area of 92 square kilometres.

== See also ==
- List of rivers of New Caledonia
