= Hienghène River =

River of northeastern New Caledonia

Coordinates: 20.717°S 164.917°E

The Hienghène River is a river of northeastern New Caledonia. It has a catchment area of 155 square kilometres.

== See also ==
- List of rivers of New Caledonia
