= Karoipa River =

River in New Caledonia, France

Coordinates: 21.4167°S 165.85°E

The Karoipa River is a river of New Caledonia. It has a catchment area of 23 square kilometres.

== See also ==
- List of rivers of New Caledonia
