= Yaté River =

River of New Caledonia

Coordinates: 22°10′3″S 166°55′36″E

Location
- Country: New Caledonia

Physical characteristics
- Mouth
  - location: Near Yaté Dam and Yaté town

The Yaté River is a river of New Caledonia and covers a catchment area of 450 square kilometres. The Yaté Dam, a significant mining area, is situated near the river's mouth and the town of Yaté.

== See also ==
- List of rivers of New Caledonia
