= Koua River =

River in France

Coordinates: 21.392°S 165.697°E

The Koua River is a river in New Caledonia. It has a catchment area of 195 square kilometres.

== See also ==
- List of rivers of New Caledonia
