= Tiaoué River =

French river

The Tiaoué River is a river of New Caledonia. It has a catchment area of 66 square kilometres.

== See also ==
- List of rivers of New Caledonia
