= Ho River =

River of New Caledonia

Coordinates: 21.185°S 165.516°E

The Ho River is a river of New Caledonia. It has a catchment area of 23 square kilometres.

== See also ==
- List of rivers of New Caledonia
