= Thio =

Thio may refer to:

== Science ==
- Thio-, a chemical prefix indicating the presence of a sulfur atom
- Thio, an abbreviation of thioglycolate broth

== Places ==
- Thio, Benin, an arrondissement in Benin
- Thio, New Caledonia, a commune on the Pacific island
- Thio River, a river in New Caledonia

== People ==
- Johnny Thio (1944–2008), Belgian footballer
- Thio Li-ann (born 1968), Singaporean law professor
- Thio Su Mien (1938–2025), Singaporean legal academic and lawyer
- Teoh, a Chinese surname sometimes rendered as "Thio"

== Other ==
- Thio Sport, a New Caledonian football team
