= Saint Vincent Bay =

Bay in New Caledonia, France

Saint Vincent Bay Baie Saint Vincent
- Bay
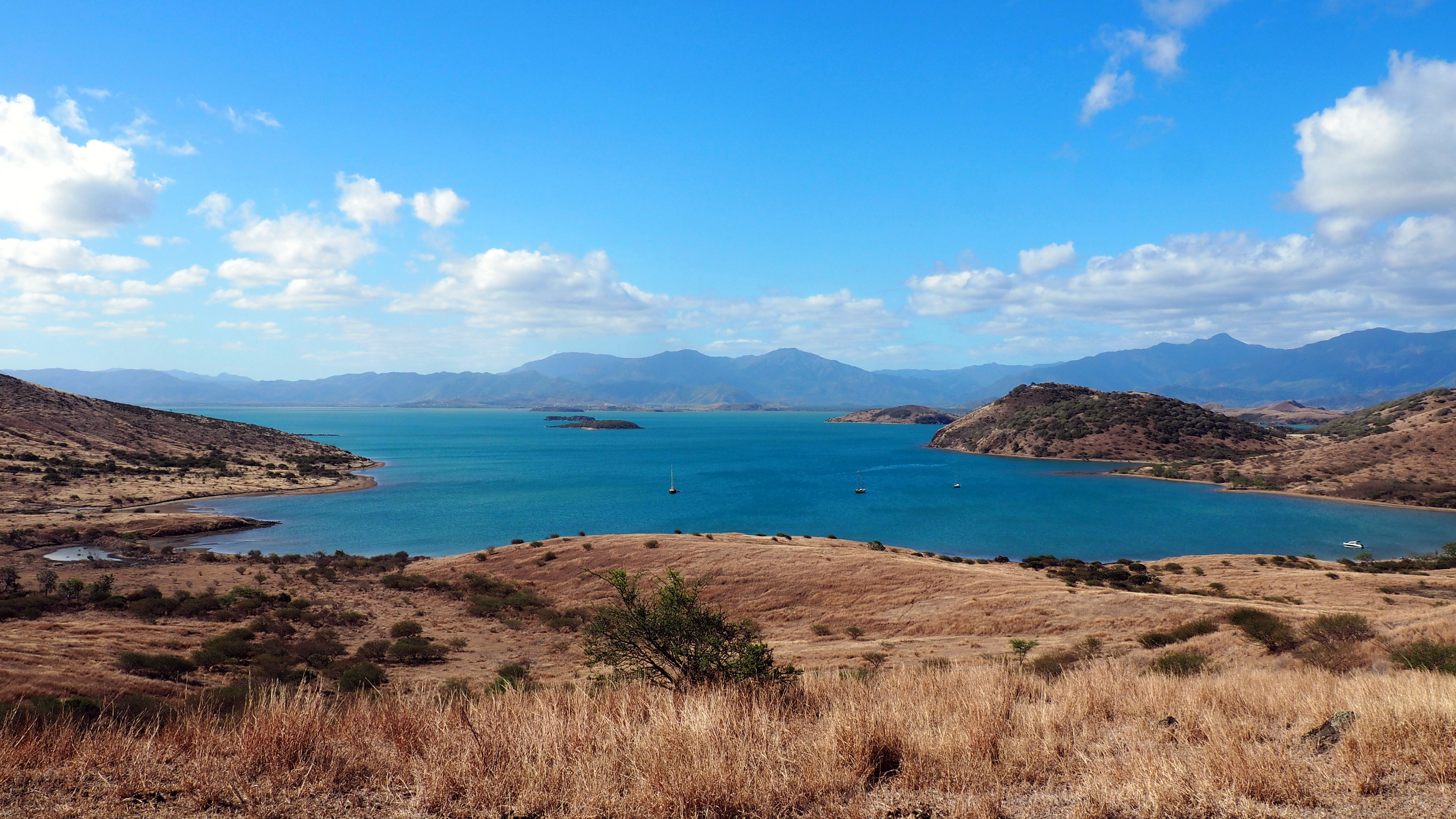
- Saint Vincent Bay

- Coordinates: 21°56′26″S 166°3′40″E
- Location: New Caledonia

Saint Vincent Bay or Baie Saint Vincent is a bay in southwestern New Caledonia. It is lies north of Inaccessible Bay. It contains Parseval Island and several others. The commune of Bouloupais lies on this stretch of the coast. The Ouenghi River also enters the sea at Saint Vincent Bay.

Saint Vincent Bay ranges from 5–15 m (16–49 ft) deep. The bay's floor is carved with submarine canyons from the most recent Ice Age, suggesting that the bay was exposed to the surface at that time.
