= Ouango River =

River in New Caledonia, France

The Ouango River is a river of New Caledonia. It has a catchment area of 16 square kilometres.

== See also ==
- List of rivers of New Caledonia
