= Poué Koué River =

River of New Caledonia

The Poué Koué River is a river of New Caledonia. It has a catchment area of 32 square kilometres.

== See also ==
- List of rivers of New Caledonia
