= Pourina River =

River of New Caledonia

Coordinates: 22.029°S 166.735°E

The Pourina River is a river of New Caledonia. It has a catchment area of 98 square kilometres.

== See also ==
- List of rivers of New Caledonia
