= Nakéty River =

River of New Caledonia

Coordinates: 21.552°S 166.0286°E

The Nakéty River is a river of New Caledonia. It has a catchment area of 106 square kilometres (26,000 acres).

== See also ==
- List of rivers of New Caledonia
