= Nimbaye River =

River of northeastern New Caledonia

Coordinates: 21.086°S 165.364°E

The Nimbaye River is a river of northeastern New Caledonia. It has a catchment area of 321 square kilometres, and it ends its course in the commune of Ponérihouen.

== See also ==
- List of rivers of New Caledonia
