= Témala River =

River of New Caledonia

Coordinates: 20.867°S 164.686°E

The Témala River is a river of New Caledonia. It has a catchment area of 352 square kilometres.

== See also ==
- List of rivers of New Caledonia
