= Voh River =

River of New Caledonia

Coordinates: 20.924°S 164.741°E

The Voh River is a river of New Caledonia. It has a catchment area of 227 square kilometres.

== See also ==
- List of rivers of New Caledonia
