= Kofi Amoa-Abban =

Ghanaian businessman

- Born: Kofi Amoa-Abban; Tema, Ghana
- Education: Mfantsipim School
- Alma mater: University of Ghana
- Occupation: Businessman
- Years active: 2000–present
- Known for: Founder of Rigworld Group
- Title: Chief executive officer, Rigworld Group
- Board member of: Rigworld Group; KOKA Energy; Rigworld International Services; Asante Kotoko S.C.
- Parent(s): Kofi Amoa-Abban (father); Leticia Amoa-Abban (mother)
- Website: rigworldgroup.com

Kofi Amoa-Abban is a Ghanaian businessman in the oil and gas industry. He is the founder and chief executive officer of Rigworld Group, an oil and gas services company based in Ghana with operations in West Africa.

== Early life and education ==
Amoa-Abban was born in Tema, Ghana, to Kofi Amoa-Abban, a director at the textile company TTL, and Leticia Amoa-Abban, a retail trader. He attended Mfantsipim School in Cape Coast. He holds a bachelor's degree in psychology from the University of Ghana and later undertook master's studies in Oslo, Norway.

== Career ==
Before starting his own business, Amoa-Abban worked as a drill crew member on the Atwood Hunter drilling rig, which drilled the Teak-1, Teak-2 and Banda wells offshore Ghana.

In 2011 he founded Rigworld in a small office in Osu, Accra, initially providing recruitment services to Ghana's oil and gas industry. In July 2015 he co-founded PressureTech, a subsidiary of Rigworld International Services that provides engineering services to oil and gas companies. Rigworld International Services later signed a network partner agreement with the Scottish firm Hydrasun.

=== Training centres ===
In 2017 Rigworld opened the Rigworld Training Centre at Kejebril, near Takoradi in the Western Region, at a reported cost of US$8.5 million. The centre offers offshore safety and survival courses and has a helipad, a water survival training pool and simulators. The centre later received ISO 9001:2015 certification from DNV GL.

In October 2022 the group opened a second training centre in Accra, on the premises of the Regional Maritime University, in partnership with the university.

In November 2026 Amoa-Abban announced the construction of an oil and gas survival training centre in Côte d'Ivoire, developed with the Académie Régionale des Sciences et Techniques de la Mer (ARSTM) in Abidjan.

=== Companies ===
Companies associated with Amoa-Abban include:

- Rigworld International Services Ltd
- Rigworld Solutions
- Rigworld Training
- Rigworld Petroleum
- Steadfast Rigworld
- Hydrasun Rigworld
- Score Rigworld
- Transatlantic Services Ltd
- Axiss Shipping
- KOKA Energy

== Other activities ==
Amoa-Abban runs the Kofi Amoa-Abban Foundation, which supports education, health and youth programmes. He is a member of the board of the Ghanaian football club Asante Kotoko S.C.

== Personal life ==
His mother, Leticia Amoa-Abban, died after a brief illness.

== Honours ==
In February 2016 Amoa-Abban received an honorary doctorate in business administration from the Commonwealth University and the London Graduate School.

| Year | Organiser | Award | Ref. |
|---|---|---|---|
| 2016 | Tema Excellence Awards Foundation | Extraordinary Entrepreneur | |
| 2016 | EMY Awards | Rising Star (special award) | |
| 2016 | Oil and Gas Ghana Awards | CEO of the Year (upstream) | |
| 2016 | Ghana Oil and Gas Awards | Rising Star; Oil and Gas Personality of the Year (upstream) | |
| 2017 | Ghana Entrepreneur and Corporate Executive Awards | Oil and Gas Entrepreneur of 2016 | |
| 2017 | Ghana-UK Based Achievement Awards | Black Star Award for Young Oil and Gas Entrepreneur | |
| 2017 | Ghana Shippers' Awards | Most Promising CEO | |
| 2017 | Forty Under 40 Awards | Young Leader in Oil and Gas | |
| 2018 | Gender and Development Initiative for Africa | GACH Award | |
| 2018 | Forty Under 40 Awards | Young Leader in Oil and Gas | |
| 2018 | Oil and Gas Ghana Awards | Oil and Gas Personality of the Year (upstream) | |
| 2019 | Ghana Oil and Gas Awards | CEO of the Year (upstream) | |
| 2020 | Ghana Development Awards | Honouree | |
| 2023 | FIN-Forbes Best of Africa Awards | Award recipient | |
