= Koniambo mine =

Coordinates: 21.008°S 164.73°E

- Interactive map of Koniambo mine
- Location: North Province, New Caledonia
- Products: Ferronickel
- Opened: 2014
- Company: Koniambo Nickel SAS (KNS)
- Website: smsp.nc

The Koniambo mine is a large open pit mine of the laterite variety in the north of New Caledonia in the North Province. It is closest to the small town of Voh, on the west coast of the island. Nickel is found in saprolite ore on the Koniambo Massif, and taken by conveyor to a new smelter on the coast. Koniambo has one of the largest nickel reserves in New Caledonia, with around 151 million tonnes of ore grading at 2.58% nickel, which was in 2014 reputed to be the highest-grade undeveloped property in the world. Each 62.5 million tonnes of ore contains 4 million tonnes of nickel metal. The final output of the mine is ferronickel, approximately 176,000t per annum of which is produced in shot form. The shot is packaged into two-tonne bags for onward shipment. The projected mine life from first exploitation is 25 years. A deep water private port was built for import and export purposes.

== History ==
=== 20th century ===
Koniambo was exploited prior to the Second World War by Société Le Nickel (SLN), the French-owned company that controlled 90% of nickel production on the islands at that time, but had since ceased. Following practices of the time, indentured labour was used, working in harsh conditions, brought in from Vietnam and other countries.

=== 21st century ===
Discussions begun to extend mining on the massif in the 1990s after deals had been struck to give some political independence to the new northern Province, dominated by the Kanak, after violent clashes between French loyalists and independence supporters in the 1980s. Northern Kanak interests sought an industrial project that could give them a measure of economic independence from France. The signing of the ‘Bercy Agreements’ in 1998 permitted development to proceed, but required a new port, power station to fuel the country's second nickel smelter, and an 11 km long conveyor from the mine to the smelter. The brokering of this deal by André Dang Van Nha, an important industrialist sympathetic to Kanak interests, and other key individuals involved a swap of mining titles with other SLN nickel mines, political interventions, and clever bargaining to provide financing and a supply of nickel to the smelter development.

The budgeted US$5.3 billion plant at Vavouto was operated by Koniambo Nickel SAS (KNS) over the period between November 2014 and August 2024. Metal was first produced in April 2013.

The project, which was inaugurated by French president Francois Hollande and Glencore CEO Ivan Glasenberg, was a joint venture between the Northern Province’s Société minière du sud Pacifique (SMSP) and Xstrata. The project hired 950 full-time employees. Cost overruns meant that capital expenditures totalled US$7bn by project completion in 2014. The Northern Province has a 51% share, making this one of the largest mines in the world with majority Indigenous ownership and control.

In August 2007 the project was headed by Falconbridge Limited. CEO Aaron Regent was in talks with China Minmetals and China Development Bank about them investing in the form of debt rather than equity.

The project got the green light from the Xstrata board in October 2007. At the time it was budgeted by Xstrata nickel chief Ian Pearce for US$3.8 billion. Pearce was "confident the firm had the experience and expertise to deliver the Koniambo project on budget and on time," even though the firm had previously grown chiefly by the mergers and acquisitions game. In August 2011 Xstrata CEO Mick Davis blamed the capex overruns on "hyper-inflation in mining project inputs" and felt that they were project specific; he was "forgiven" by mining analysts. The project was in April 2013 said to be a "tier-one asset with long-term cash costs at the bottom of the second quartile." By February 2024, it was said to remain "an unsustainable operation and Glencore cannot justify continuing to fund losses to the detriment of its shareholders." As of Q4 2023, a total of US$9.0 billion had been disbursed since project inception.

== Production ==
The mine and smelter started production in 2014, unfortunately at a time when nickel prices were low, and production targets have not yet been met due to series of problems with the smelter. André Dang, now in his 80s, has stepped down as President and CEO of SMSP, to be replaced by Karl Therby. Both are protective of New Caledonian ownership in its mining interests. By a quirk of fate, Dang was born at Koniambo to an indentured Vietnamese labourer in 1936, and his father, who died in 1937 in a mining accident, is buried at Voh.

In September 2023, Glencore announced it was planning to pull out completely from the deal with SMSP to operate Koniambo, unless the fortunes of the mine changed by February 2024, in a period of low nickel prices. They cited their large investment to date with insufficient returns. Production stopped in February 2024, all foreign workers left, and bidding for the 49% share was ongoing.
