= Ouaième River =

River of northeastern New Caledonia

Coordinates: 20.637°S 164.751°E

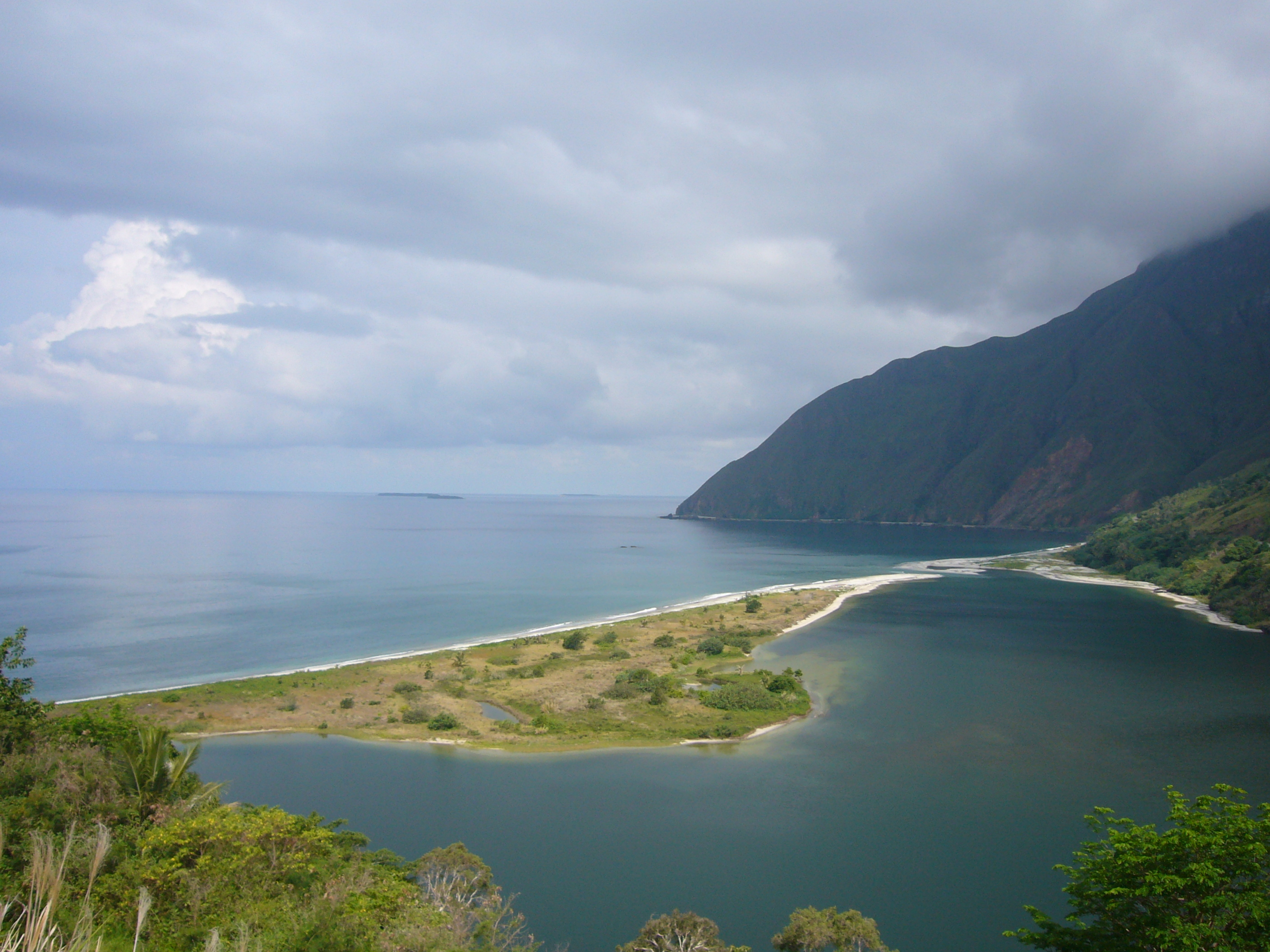
River mouth

The Ouaième River is a river of northeastern New Caledonia. It has a catchment area of 338 square kilometres.

== See also ==
- List of rivers of New Caledonia
