= Tontouta River =

River of New Caledonia

Coordinates: 21.969°S 166.231°E

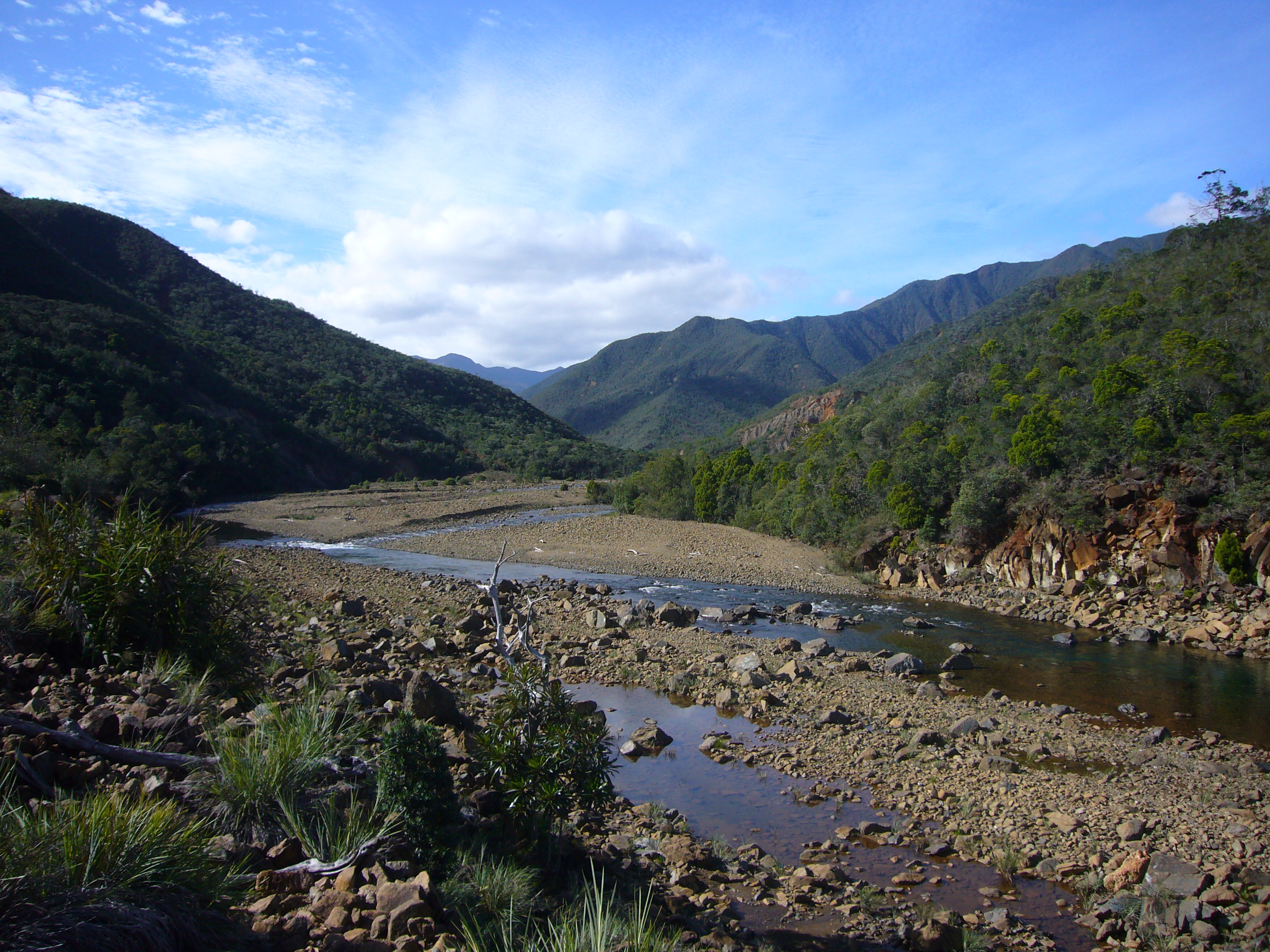
Tontouta river around "Liliane" place.

The Tontouta River is a river of New Caledonia. It has a catchment area of 476 square kilometres.

== See also ==
- List of rivers of New Caledonia
