= Mou boots =

MOU
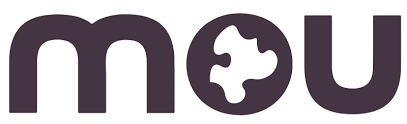
- Industry: Retail
- Founded: 2002
- Founder: Shelley Tichborne
- Headquarters: London, UK
- Area served: Worldwide
- Products: Footwear, accessories
- Website: www.mou.com

Mou is a footwear company founded in 2002 in London by Shelley Tichborne.

== Overview ==
Mou creates hand-crafted footwear in natural fibres. Actor Evan Peters, Emma Roberts, Idris Elba, Debra Messing, Priyanka Chopra, Chloe Sevigny and Sarah Jessica Parker were in the news while purchasing Mou boots. The Daily Telegraph reported that Penélope Cruz was dressed up for the Arctic wearing sheepskin boots from Mou and said she loved them. As per the article posted in Huffpost, Gwyneth Paltrow recommended Mou's Antelope Cowboy winter boots.

According to a report published by Market Research Place titled "Place Global UGG Boots Market Research Report 2019" the demand for such type of boots is expected to show significant growth in the coming years and focuses on the following brands UGG, YellowEarth, JumboUGG, CozySteps, EMU, MOU, Shepherd's Life, JUYI, Yijiabao, EVER, Aukoala, ICCASU, KOALABI, Luxe, LOVE, Blue Mountains, Belle.
