= Austrian Speleological Association =

Austrian national caving organization

Association of Austrian Speleologists
- "Verband Österreichischer Höhlenforschung"
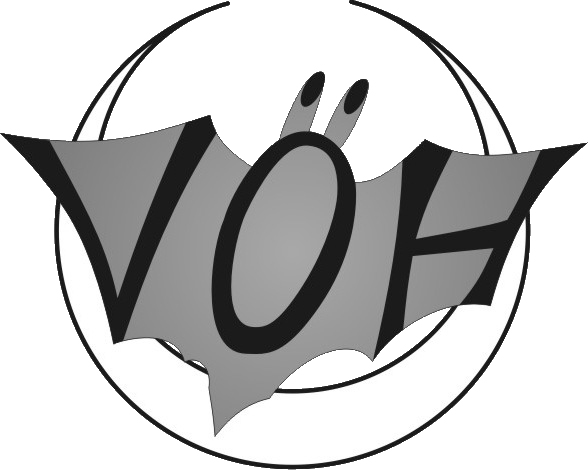
- Abbreviation: (VÖH)
- Formation: 1949; 77 years ago
- Type: INGO
- Purpose: Coordination of Austrian caving clubs
- Headquarters: Obere Donaustr. 97/1/61 A-1020 Vienna
- Region served: Austria
- Members: 2,000 (2022)
- Official language: German
- President: Christoph Spötl
- Vice-President: Ernest Geyer
- Vice-President: Barbara Wielander
- Publication: DIE HÖHLE (THE CAVE)
- Affiliations: International Union of Speleology; European Speleological Federation (FSE)
- Website: hoehle.org

The Austrian Speleological Association (Verband Österreichischer Höhlenforschung, VÖH) is a national caving organization was founded as an umbrella organization of Austrian caving clubs and show caves in 1949.

== Activities ==
The Association coordinates the activities of 25 speleological associations; 24 in Austria and one in Germany. Membership in these associations automatically grants membership in the umbrella organization. Individual memberships are not accepted. The Association maintains:

- a website featuring the 32 show caves found throughout the country.
- a list of Austria's longest and deepest caves.
- a library of 2,800 books and other materials (in the Karst and Speleology Working Group Library, Natural History Museum in Vienna).

== Awards ==
1. The Golden Cave Bear is "a badge of honor for special services to Austrian caving." It was first awarded in 2014.
2. The Poldi Fuhrich Award, named in honor of the Austrian woman who was a caving and karst pioneer Leopoldine Fuhrich (1898-1926), is presented to young speleologists for "outstanding work in the field of caving, cave documentation and public relations." It was first awarded in 2010.

== Publications ==
- Caves and Karst in Austria (Book)
- Die Höhle - Journal of Karst and Speleology (magazine produced jointly with the Association of German Cave and Karst Researchers)
- Association newsletters
- SPELDOK series
- Karst range and Karst vulnerability maps

== Collaborations ==
The Association works with

- the Karst and Speleology Working Group of the National History Museum to manage SPELDOK, a database containing data on over 15,500 caves.
- international karst and speleological organizations on research projects.

== Associations ==
The Association is a member of these international organizations:

- International Union of Speleology (UIS)
- European Speleological Federation (FSE)
- Environmental Umbrella Organization (formerly UWD)
- Association of Austrian Academic Societies (VWGÖ)
- Association of Alpine Associations of Austria (VAVÖ)*, which includes the Austrian Alpine Club, Friends of Nature Austria, Austrian Tourist Club, and the Austrian Mountaineering Association.

== Notable members ==
- Alfred Koppenwallner (1921–2016), jeweler, discovered the Cave of Tantalus (Tantalhöhle) mountaineer, pilot, motorcyclist who participated in the Oldtimer Grand Prix (Salzburgring) and skier in the Österreichische Alpenfahrt.
- Sabine Zimmerebner (1970-2015) Quoted in the July 3, 2018 New York Times article, Ms. Zimmerebner was one of 728 rescuers who collaborated to free an injured spelunker in the history-making 2014 Riesending Cave rescue.
