= Dumbéa River =

River of New Caledonia

Coordinates: 22.134°S 166.497°E

The Dumbéa River is a river of New Caledonia. It has a catchment area of 233 square kilometres. It is a beautiful river, and flows from the Diahot River.

== Geography ==
Its upstream course is divided into two torrential branches:

- the eastern branch, the main one, covers a watershed of 68 km2 ^{and} flows over 12 km from the Montagne des Sources (which peaks at an altitude of 1,050 m) to the confluence,
- The northern branch covers a watershed of 41.5 km2 ^{,} with a main course length of 9.1 km between the source at an altitude of 1,250 m and the confluence zone.

== See also ==
- List of rivers of New Caledonia
