= Tchamba River =

River in New Caledonia, France

Coordinates: 21.0121°S 165.3966°E

The Tchamba River is a river of northeastern New Caledonia. It has a catchment area of 187 square kilometres (72 square miles).

== See also ==
- List of rivers of New Caledonia
