= Monéo River =

River of New Caledonia

Coordinates: 21.15°S 165.436°E

The Monéo River is a river of New Caledonia. Along with the Néavin River it has a combined catchment area of 202 square kilometres.

== See also ==
- List of rivers of New Caledonia
