= Thio River =

River of New Caledonia

Coordinates: 21.646°S 166.169°E

The Thio River is a river of New Caledonia. It has a catchment area of 404 square kilometres.

== See also ==
- List of rivers of New Caledonia
