= Koniambo Massif =

Mountain range in New Caledonia

Coordinates: 20°59′53″S 164°48′57″E

The Koniambo Massif is a mountain range near the town of Voh on the west coast of the North Province of New Caledonia, a French territory in the south-west Pacific Ocean. It is the site of the large Koniambo nickel mine.

== Description ==
The massif is 20 kilometres (12 mi) long and 5 kilometres (3.1 mi) wide, and is located about 15 kilometres (9.3 mi) from the coast. It rises to a height of 930 metres (3,050 ft) or 940 metres (3,080 ft) from a narrow coastal plain.

Geologically:

Le massif de Koniambo comprend trois grands assemblages lithologiques et structuraux : a) l'assemblage à harzburgites et dunites serpentinisées de Vavouto; b) une séquence de dunites à chromite ; et c) une suite de nappes principalement à harzburgites +/- dunites dans la partie supérieure du massif.

(The Koniambo massif comprises three major lithological and structural assemblages: a) the harzburgite and serpentinized dunite assemblage of Vavouto; b) a chromite dunite sequence; and c) a series of nappes primarily composed of harzburgites with or without dunites in the upper part of the massif.)

== Mining ==
The Koniambo mine employed open-pit mining at multiple sites on the massif. It has one of the world's largest and highest-quality nickel laterite deposits, located on the ridge and scattered pockets on the western terraces. As of December 2013, there were 61.5 million tonnes of proven and probable ore reserves.

The mine officially opened in November 2014. It produced up to 60,000 tonnes of high-grade nickel a year. However, it closed in August 2024, after minority partner Glencore pulled out due to high production costs and cheaper Indonesian competition. It put about 1200 people out of work, devastating the local economy.

== Protected status ==
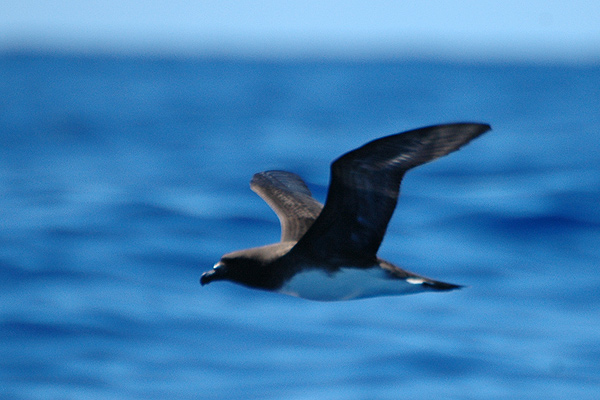
The Tahiti petrel is a Near Threatened seabird species found in the Pacific Ocean.

A 12,000 ha (30,000-acre) tract of largely forested land encompassing the Koniambo Massif was designated by BirdLife International as the Koniambo Massif Important Bird Area in 2012 because it is a breeding site for an estimated 200–400 pairs of burrow-nesting Tahiti petrels. The species was classified as Near Threatened on the IUCN Red List in 2018. Potential threats to the birds come from a suite of invasive species, including rodents, feral pigs and feral cats, as well as from mining operations and disorientation from light pollution.

The same year, it was also designated a Key Biodiversity Area.
