= Kuébéni River =

Coordinates: 22°15′48″S 167°0′58″E

Location
- Country: New Caledonia

Kuébéni is a major river of southeastern New Caledonia. Kuebeni is also known as Kouebuni Riviere, Kouébuni Rivière, La Kuébéni River etc. The river has a catchment area of 38 square kilometres and is noted for its red clay and Pisolitic sandstone and nickel mining. It flows into the sea, north of Goro.
