= Pirogues River =

River of southwestern New Caledonia

Coordinates: 22°18′25″S 166°41′15″E

Pirogues River is a major river of southwestern New Caledonia. It flows into the sea at Pirogues Bay. It is noted for its ophiolite reserves.
