= Tourism in New Caledonia =

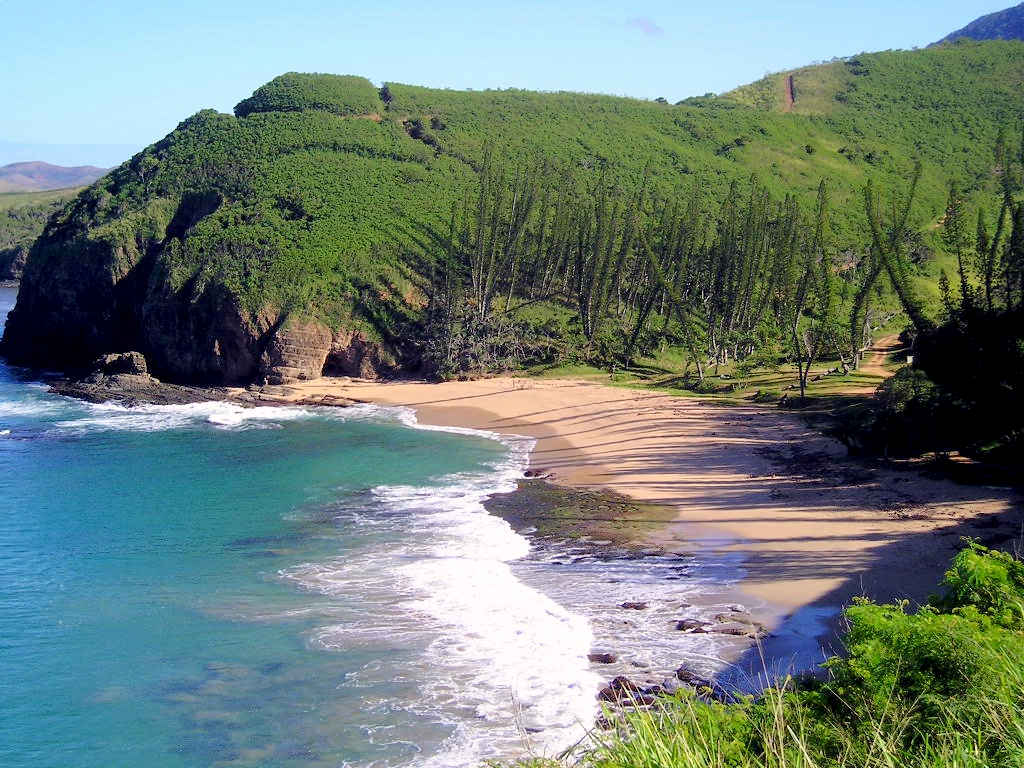

New Caledonia was "largely indifferent to tourists ... as long as nickel mining remained economically dominant". After the Korean War and Vietnam War, world prices for nickel collapsed (1970s) and aggressive marketing campaigns were initiated for the territory.

== Development of tourism ==
Tourist arrivals of 2023 in %

Cheap tourist packages were offered to Australians promising the 'Paris of the Pacific' and visitor numbers increased from less than 5000 to 20,000 in just 5 years. 37,000 tourists annually took cruises (mostly from Australia) and this allowed more hotels to be built in the 1970s and, in 1979, Club Mediterranee arrived. The tourist market had shifted by the 1980s from Australia to Japan which became the target of many tourism campaigns. By 2007, about 100,000 tourists visited each year.
