= Tiwaka River =

River of northeastern New Caledonia

Coordinates: 20.887°S 165.175°E

The Tiwaka River is a river of northeastern New Caledonia. It contains the Massif de Tchingou.

== See also ==
- List of rivers of New Caledonia
