= Mou River =

River in New Caledonia, France

Coordinates: 21.1538°S 165.5396°E

The Mou River or the Oué Pouémaeu is a river of northeastern New Caledonia. It has a catchment area of 58 square kilometres.

== See also ==
- List of rivers of New Caledonia
