= Plum River (New Caledonia) =

River of southwestern New Caledonia

Coordinates: 22°16′31″S 166°37′26″E

Plum River is a river of southwestern New Caledonia. It flows into the sea to the west of the Plum village. It is a short river, little more than an incised stream. The Plum Swamp lies in the river system.
