= Néra River =

River of New Caledonia

Coordinates: 21.588°S 165.487°E

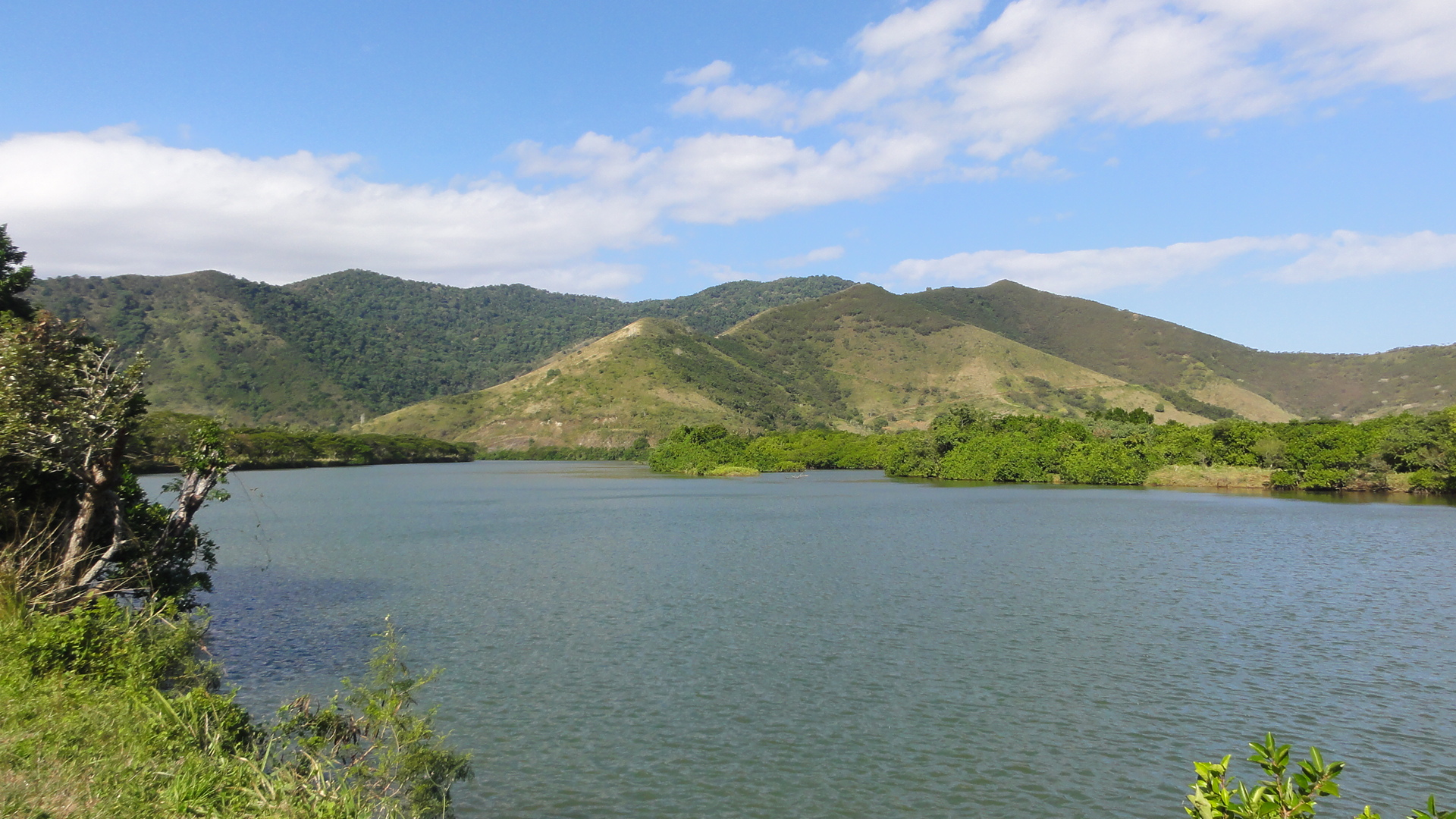
Néra River

The Néra River is a river of New Caledonia. It has a catchment area of 546 square kilometres, forming one of the largest river systems on the west coast. It empties into the eastern side of Gouaro Bay.

== See also ==
- List of rivers of New Caledonia
