= Amoa River =

River of northeastern New Caledonia

Coordinates: 20.966°S 165.206°E

The Amoa River is a river of northeastern New Caledonia. It forms a prominent valley. It has a catchment area of 182 square kilometres.

== See also ==
- List of rivers of New Caledonia
- Geography of New Caledonia
