= Yaté =

Commune of New Caledonia

- Commune
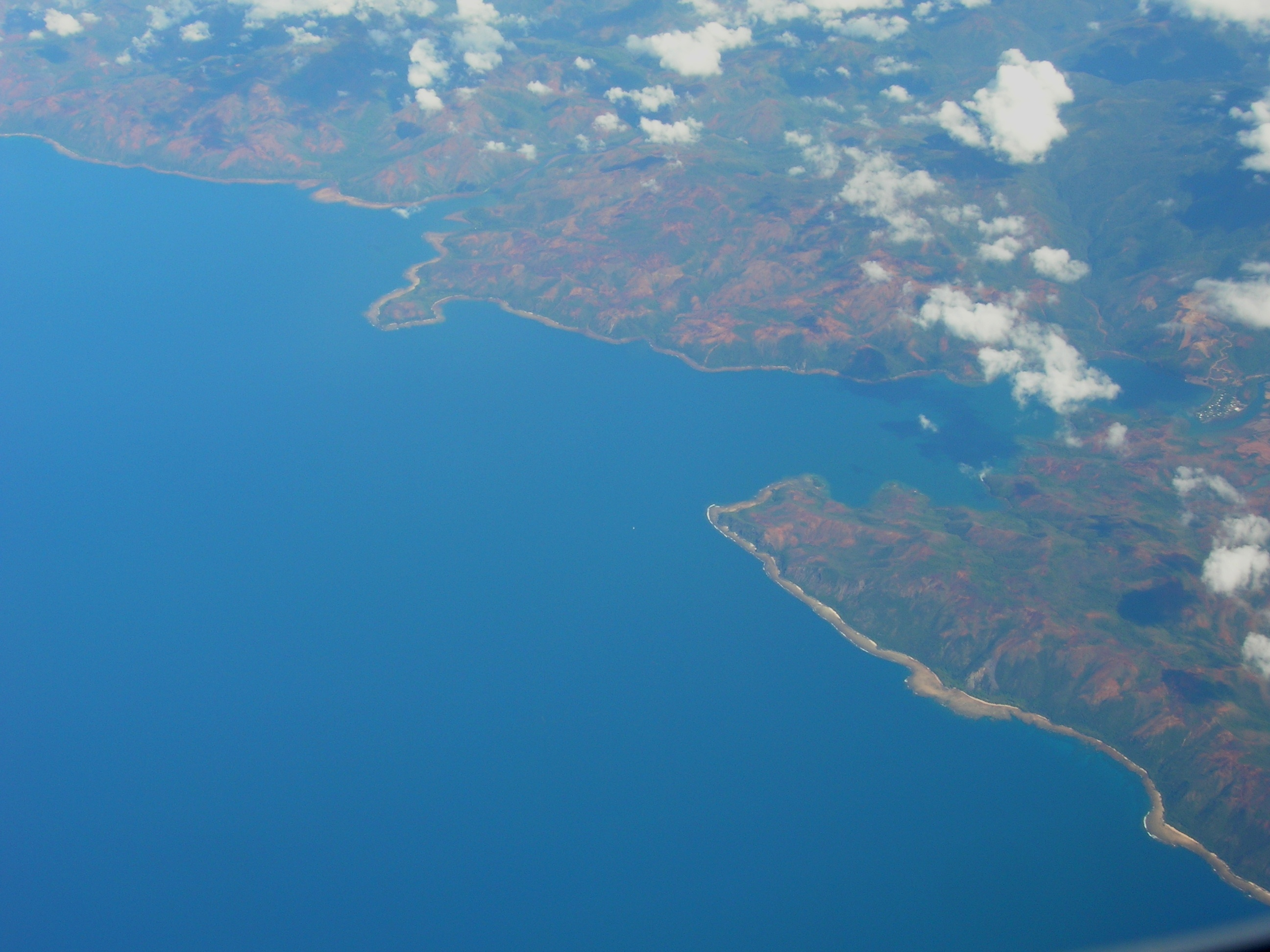
- Ouinné, a mining site in the commune of Yaté

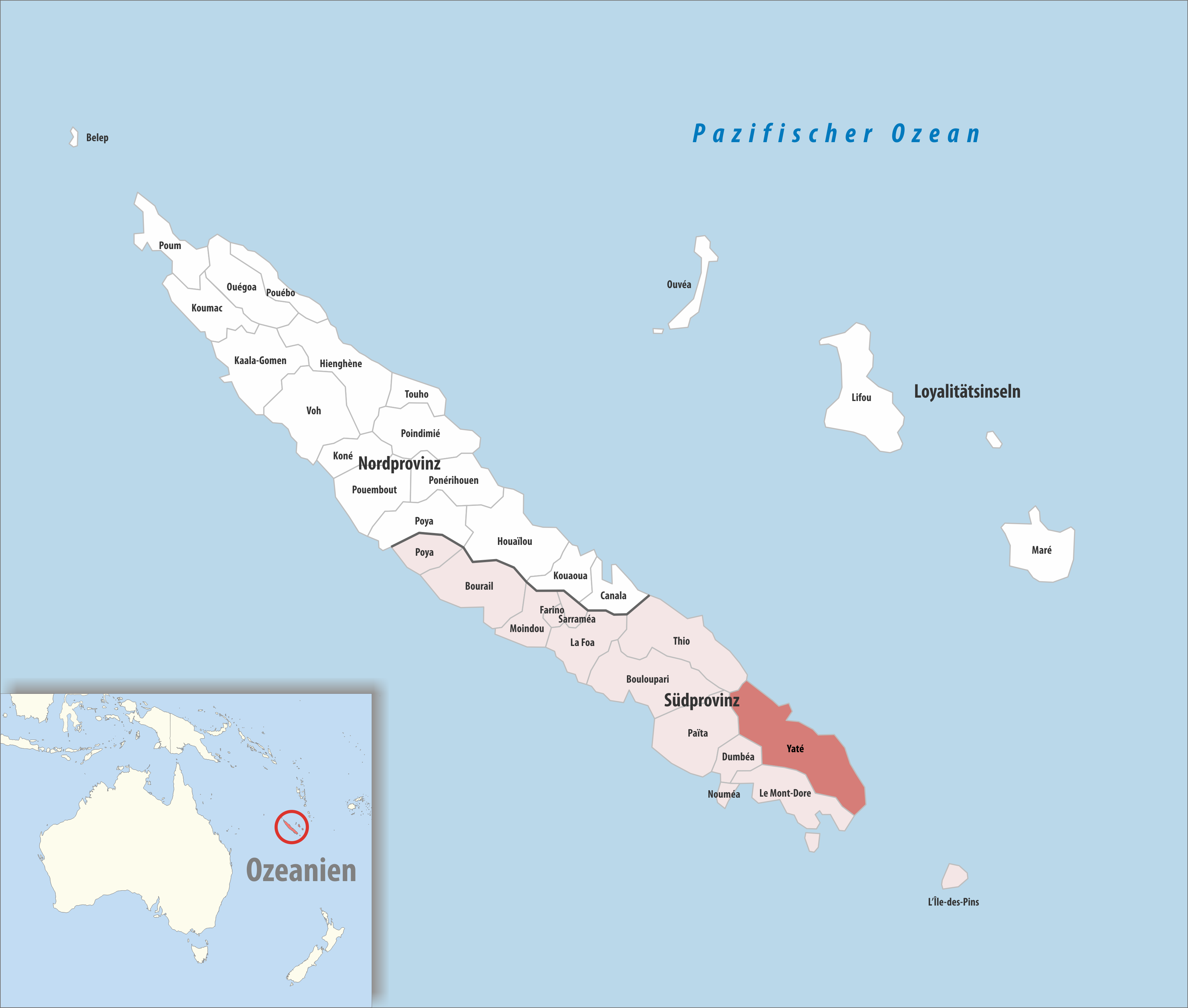
- Location of the commune (in red) within New Caledonia
- Location of Yaté
- Coordinates: 22°10′03″S 166°55′36″E
- Country: France
- Sui generis collectivity: New Caledonia
- Province: Province Sud

Government
  - Mayor (2020–2026): Victor Gouetcha
- Area^{1}: 1,338.4 km^{2} (516.8 sq mi)
- Elevation: 20 m (66 ft)
- Highest elevation: 1,501 m (4,925 ft)
- Lowest elevation: 0 m (0 ft)
- Population (2019): 1,667
  - Density: 1.246/km^{2} (3.226/sq mi)

Ethnic distribution
  - 2019 census: Kanaks 96.16% Europeans 0.72% Wallisians and Futunans 0.18% Mixed 1.68% Other 1.26%
- Time zone: UTC+11:00
- INSEE/Postal code: 98832 /98834
- ^{1} New Caledonia Land Register (DITTT) data, which exclude lakes and ponds larger than 1 km² (0.386 sq mi or 247 acres) as well as the estuaries of rivers.

Yaté (French: [jate]) is a commune in the South Province of New Caledonia, an overseas territory of France in the Pacific Ocean. The Yaté Dam and Blue River Provincial Park are located within the commune.

== Geography ==
=== Climate ===
Yaté has a tropical rainforest climate (Köppen climate classification Af). The average annual temperature in Yaté is 23.7 °C (74.7 °F). The average annual rainfall is 2,604.9 mm (102.56 in) with March as the wettest month. The temperatures are highest on average in February, at around 26.7 °C (80.1 °F), and lowest in August, at around 20.6 °C (69.1 °F). The highest temperature ever recorded in Yaté was 34.7 °C (94.5 °F) on 28 February 2008; the coldest temperature ever recorded was 12.3 °C (54.1 °F) on 18 August 2004.

Climate data for Yaté (1991–2020 averages, extremes 1993−present)
| Month | Jan | Feb | Mar | Apr | May | Jun | Jul | Aug | Sep | Oct | Nov | Dec | Year |
|---|---|---|---|---|---|---|---|---|---|---|---|---|---|
| Record high °C (°F) | 34.0 (93.2) | 34.7 (94.5) | 34.4 (93.9) | 33.4 (92.1) | 31.7 (89.1) | 30.4 (86.7) | 29.3 (84.7) | 30.0 (86.0) | 31.1 (88.0) | 32.0 (89.6) | 32.9 (91.2) | 33.8 (92.8) | 34.7 (94.5) |
| Mean daily maximum °C (°F) | 29.5 (85.1) | 30.0 (86.0) | 29.3 (84.7) | 28.0 (82.4) | 26.4 (79.5) | 25.1 (77.2) | 24.3 (75.7) | 24.3 (75.7) | 25.4 (77.7) | 26.5 (79.7) | 27.5 (81.5) | 28.7 (83.7) | 27.1 (80.8) |
| Daily mean °C (°F) | 26.2 (79.2) | 26.7 (80.1) | 26.2 (79.2) | 24.9 (76.8) | 23.2 (73.8) | 21.8 (71.2) | 20.8 (69.4) | 20.6 (69.1) | 21.6 (70.9) | 22.9 (73.2) | 23.9 (75.0) | 25.3 (77.5) | 23.7 (74.7) |
| Mean daily minimum °C (°F) | 22.9 (73.2) | 23.5 (74.3) | 23.1 (73.6) | 21.8 (71.2) | 20.0 (68.0) | 18.5 (65.3) | 17.2 (63.0) | 17.0 (62.6) | 17.8 (64.0) | 19.3 (66.7) | 20.4 (68.7) | 22.0 (71.6) | 20.3 (68.5) |
| Record low °C (°F) | 19.1 (66.4) | 18.8 (65.8) | 19.3 (66.7) | 16.6 (61.9) | 15.2 (59.4) | 12.8 (55.0) | 12.6 (54.7) | 12.3 (54.1) | 12.9 (55.2) | 14.3 (57.7) | 15.5 (59.9) | 17.1 (62.8) | 12.3 (54.1) |
| Average precipitation mm (inches) | 293.2 (11.54) | 320.3 (12.61) | 415.8 (16.37) | 306.1 (12.05) | 201.9 (7.95) | 159.2 (6.27) | 172.1 (6.78) | 141.0 (5.55) | 133.2 (5.24) | 115.9 (4.56) | 119.1 (4.69) | 227.1 (8.94) | 2,604.9 (102.56) |
| Average precipitation days (≥ 1.0 mm) | 16.6 | 17.0 | 19.7 | 17.4 | 15.5 | 13.3 | 12.0 | 11.0 | 9.5 | 10.7 | 10.3 | 13.7 | 166.7 |
Source: Météo-France

== Population ==
Historical population
| Year | Pop. | ±% |
|---|---|---|
| 2004 | 1,843 | — |
| 2009 | 1,881 | +2.1% |
| 2011 | 21,789 | +1058.4% |
| 2021 | 28,351 | +30.1% |
