= Yaté Dam =

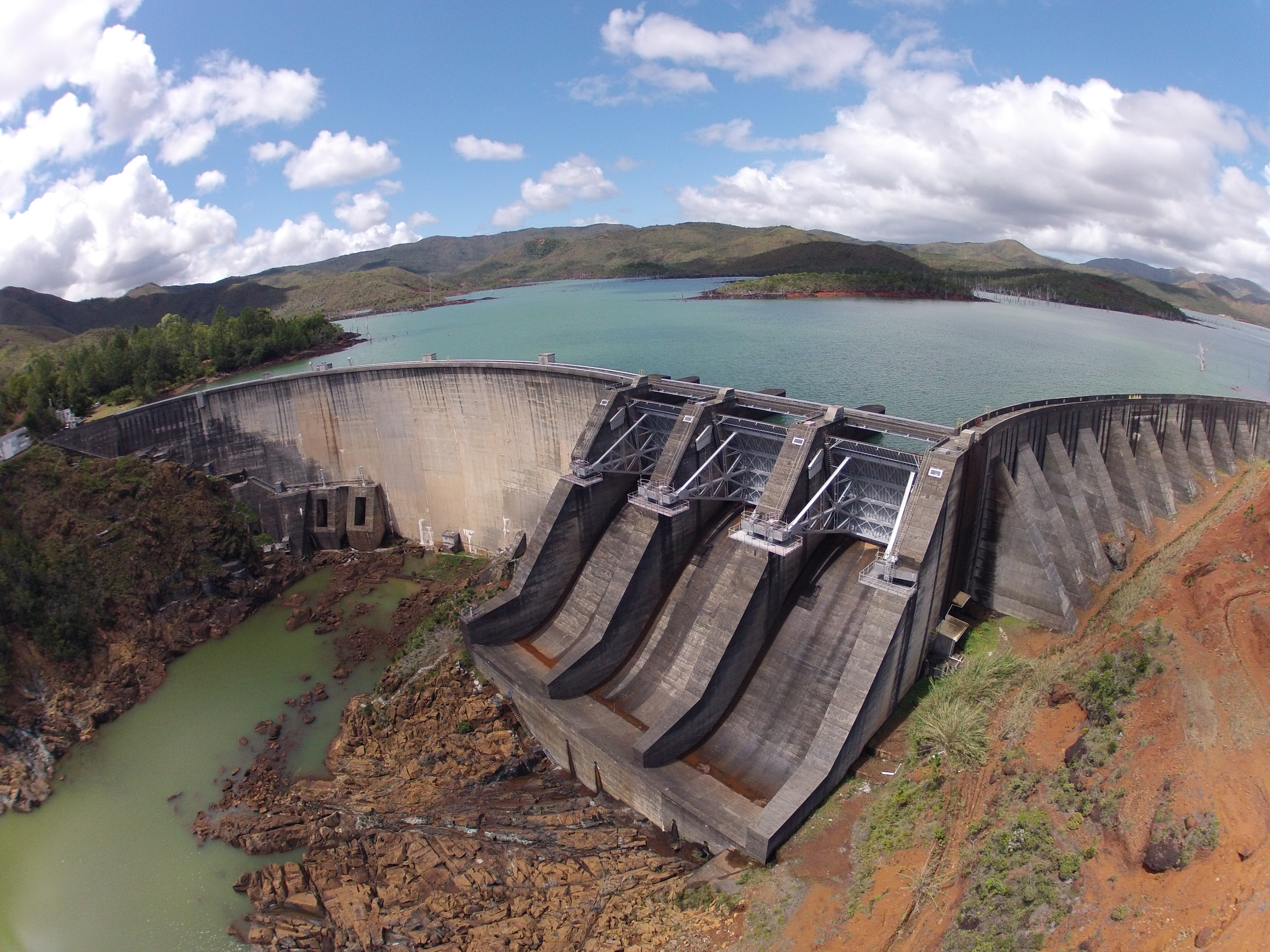
- The arch and gravity section of the dam in 2011

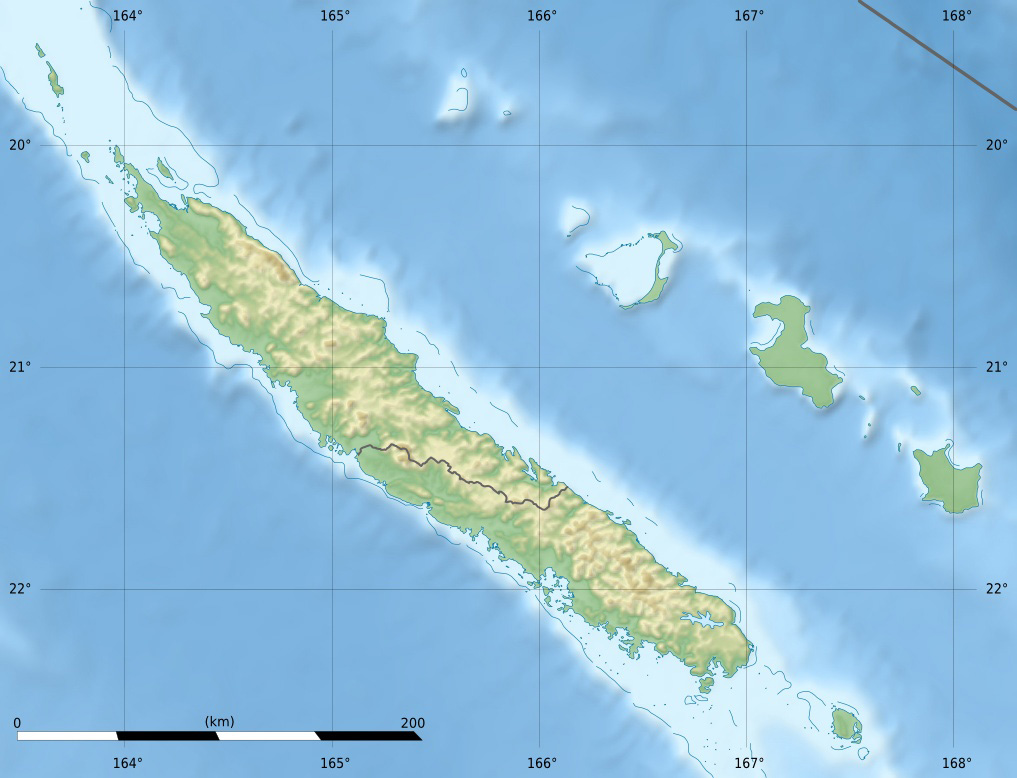
- Location within New Caledonia
- Country: France
- Location: Yaté, South Province, New Caledonia
- Coordinates: 22°09′06.33″S 166°52′52.50″E
- Purpose: Power
- Status: Operational
- Construction began: 1955
- Opening date: 1959; 67 years ago
- Owner: New Caledonian Society Energy (ENERCAL)

Dam and spillways
- Impounds: Yaté River
- Height: 61 m (200 ft)
- Length: 580 m (1,900 ft)
- Spillway type: Controlled overflow, three tainter gates

Reservoir
- Creates: Lake Yaté
- Total capacity: 315,000,000 m^{3} (255,000 acre⋅ft)
- Catchment area: 435 km^{2} (168 mi^{2})
- Surface area: 40 km^{2} (15 mi^{2})

Yaté Hydroelectric Power Station
- Coordinates: 22°09′12.11″S 166°54′40.07″E
- Commission date: 1958
- Hydraulic head: 157 m (515 ft)
- Turbines: 4 x 17 MW Francis-type
- Installed capacity: 68 MW
- Annual generation: 307 GWh

The Yaté Dam is an arch dam on the Yaté River in Yaté commune of New Caledonia, France. The primary purpose of the dam is hydroelectric power generation and it supports a 68 MW power station. Plans for the project began in the early 1950s and the dam was designed by Coyne et Bellier. The owner and operator of the project, New Caledonian Society Energy (ENERCAL), was established on 27 August 1955 to implement the project. Construction began that year and the power station was commissioned in 1958. The dam and entire scheme was inaugurated by Jacques Soustelle, then Minister of State in charge of Overseas Departments, on 21 September 1959. It is the tallest dam and creates the largest reservoir in New Caledonia.

While the main retaining portion of the dam is an arch design, it also has a concrete gravity section and an earthen and rock-fill section. The arch dam has a height of 60 m (200 ft) and length of 200 m (660 ft). On its left side adjoins the gravity section which serves as a spillway and is 61 m (200 ft) tall. It is 100 m (330 ft) long. The embankment section located direct the northwest of the gravity portion is 280 m (920 ft) long. Water from the dam is diverted through the hillsides via two 2,600 m (8,500 ft) long penstocks to the power station downstream along the Yaté River in the town of Yaté. The difference in elevation between the dam and power station affords a hydraulic head (water drop) of 157 m (515 ft). Within the power station lies four 17 MW Francis turbine-generates which produce an average of 307 GWh annually.
