= Voh =

Commune of New Caledonia

- Commune
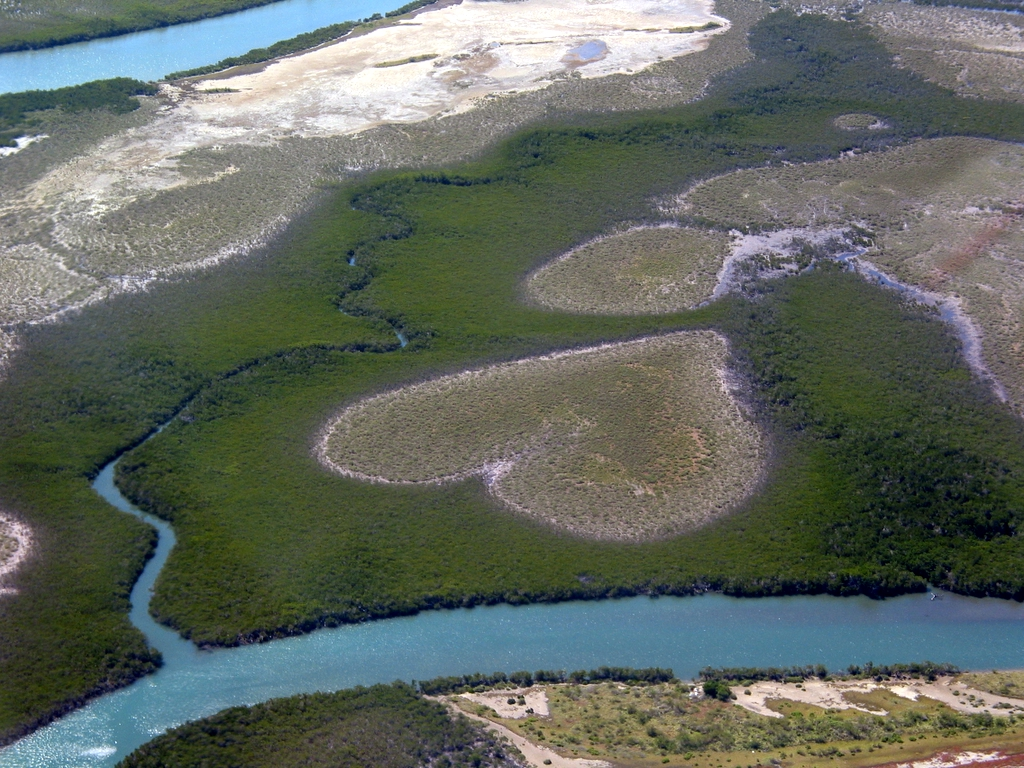
- A view of the Heart of Voh

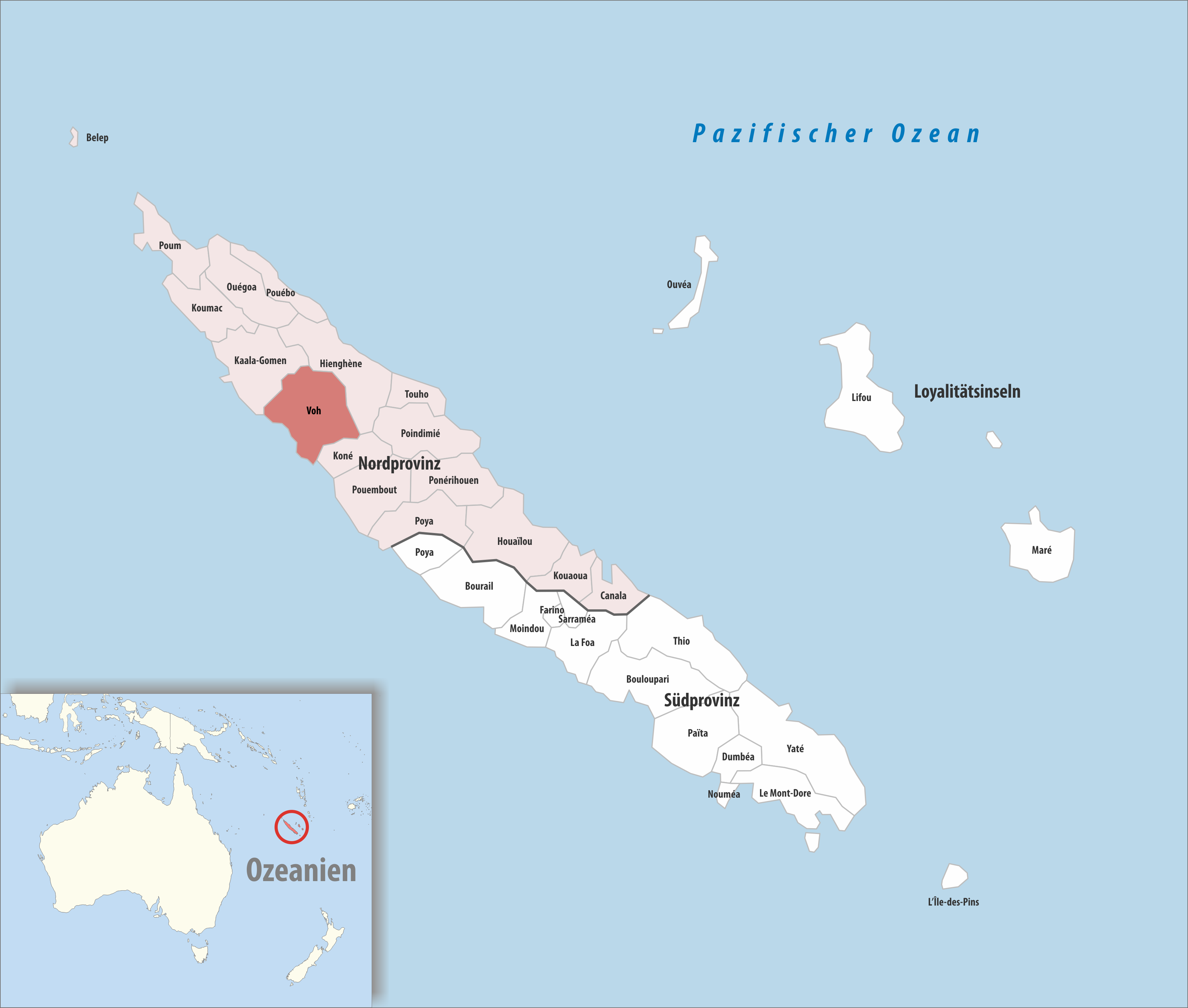
- Location of the commune (in red) within New Caledonia
- Location of Voh
- Coordinates: 20°57′33″S 164°41′17″E
- Country: France
- Sui generis collectivity: New Caledonia
- Province: North Province

Government
  - Mayor (2020–2026): Joel Boatate Kolekole
- Area^{1}: 804.9 km^{2} (310.8 sq mi)
- Elevation: 6 m (20 ft)
- Highest elevation: 1,122 m (3,681 ft)
- Lowest elevation: 0 m (0 ft)
- Population (2019 census): 2,856
  - Density: 3.548/km^{2} (9.190/sq mi)

Ethnic distribution
  - 2019 census: Kanaks 63.45% Europeans 8.65% Wallisians and Futunans 1.58% Mixed 13.1% Other 13.24%
- Time zone: UTC+11:00
- INSEE/Postal code: 98831 /98833
- ^{1} New Caledonia Land Register (DITTT) data, which exclude lakes and ponds larger than 1 km² (0.386 sq mi or 247 acres) as well as the estuaries of rivers.

Voh (French: [vo], Pwapwâ: Vook) is a commune in the North Province of New Caledonia, an overseas territory of France in the Pacific Ocean.

It has become famous for the aerial photography of what is known as The Heart of Voh, a large formation of vegetation that resembles a heart seen from above. Photographer Yann Arthus-Bertrand contributed to its popularity by using a photograph of the 'heart' as the dust jacket art to his books The Earth from the Air and Earth from Above.

Voh is also the closest large settlement to the enormous Koniambo mine, and it hosted indentured Vietnamese mineworkers from the late 1800s until the 1940s, termed the Chân Dăng.

== Colonial establishment ==
In 1865 Kanak warriors killed workers constructing a fort at Pouangué (Gatope), and it was abandoned in 1869. In 1891 the French administration decided the vallée de Voh would be a good place for French free settlers. Land for farming was reportedly renounced voluntarily by the Kanak inhabitants, on the right bank of the river. At this time, there were no roads. Some 950 ha was surveyed by Piarchi, and lots of 0.15 ha to 380 ha were handed out for housing and livestock farming. By late 1892 23 Europeans including Georges Weiss, Jean-François Jocteur, Alexandre Paulaud and Claude Rousson, Jean-Baptiste Mirandon and former army officers Pancrace Mainard and Marin Poncet arrived and began building and farming. The settlement later expanded to the left bank of the river, and Governor Paul Feillet visited in 1894. Settlers soon turned to coffee production. The town now features a Musée du Café.

== Today ==
Mining has brought new wealth to the region, the growth of employment and new housing, and problems associated with the temporary workforce.

== People of Voh ==
Its most famous son is André Dang Van Nha who was born in the Vietnamese labour camp in 1936, and who now has a controlling interest, as head of SMSP, in the huge Koniambo mine. His father, killed building a wharf in 1937, is buried in the Voh cemetery.
