= Naval Base Noumea =

U.S. Navy sea and air base (1942–1947)

- Nouméa, New Caledonia
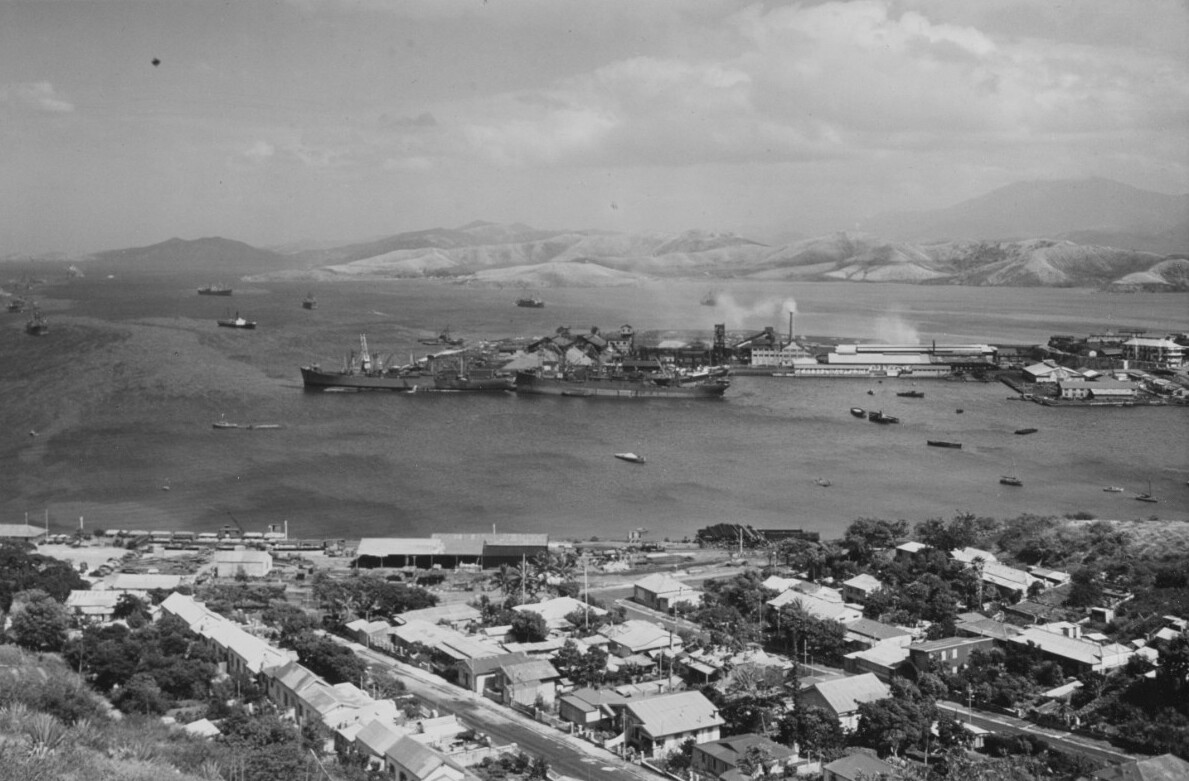
- Naval Base Noumea in 1942

Site information
- Type: Military airfield and naval base
- Controlled by: United States Navy

Location
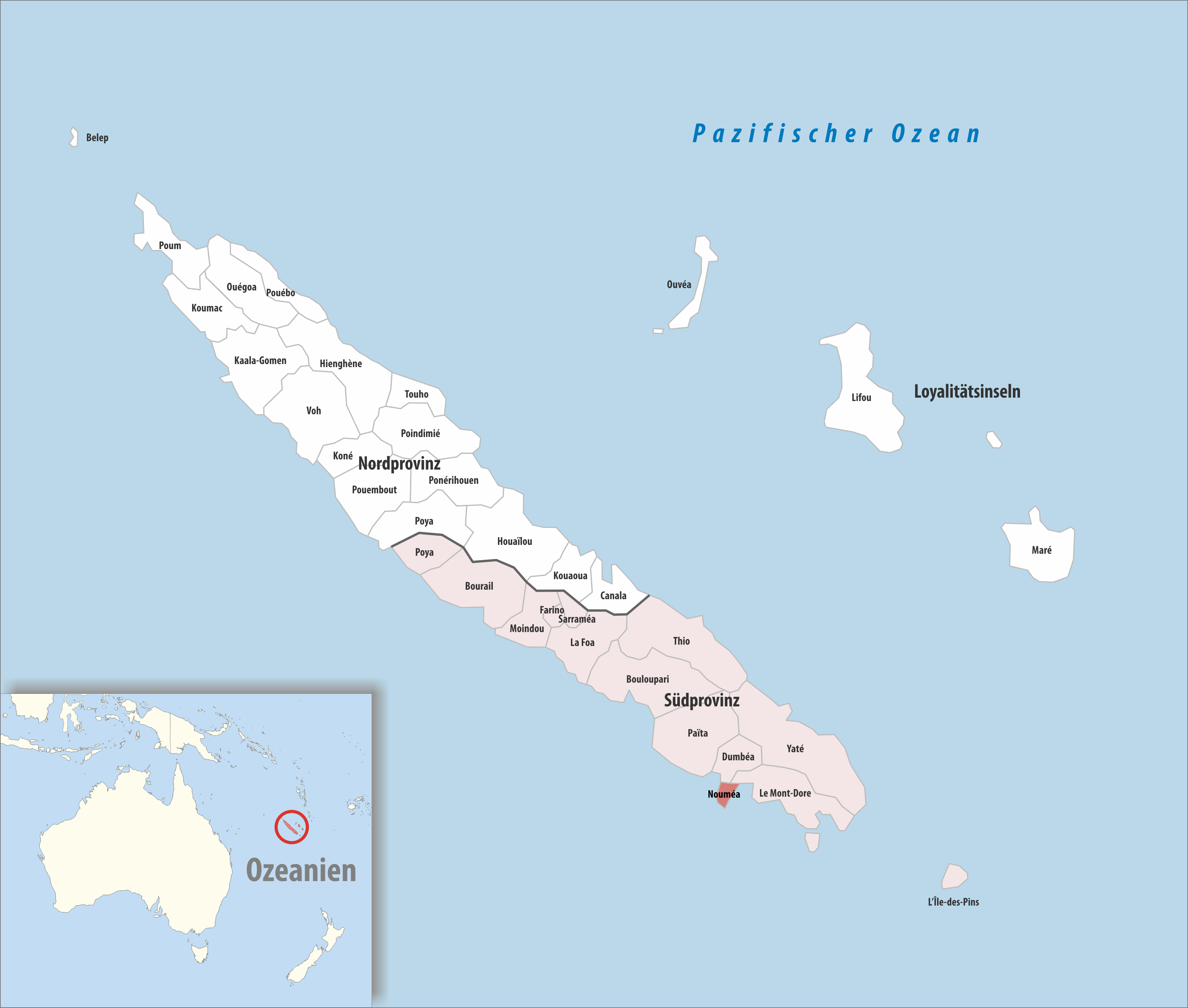
- Location of the Naval Base Noumea (in red) within New Caledonia
- Coordinates: 22°16′12″S 166°25′09″E

Site history
- Built: 1942
- In use: 1942–1947

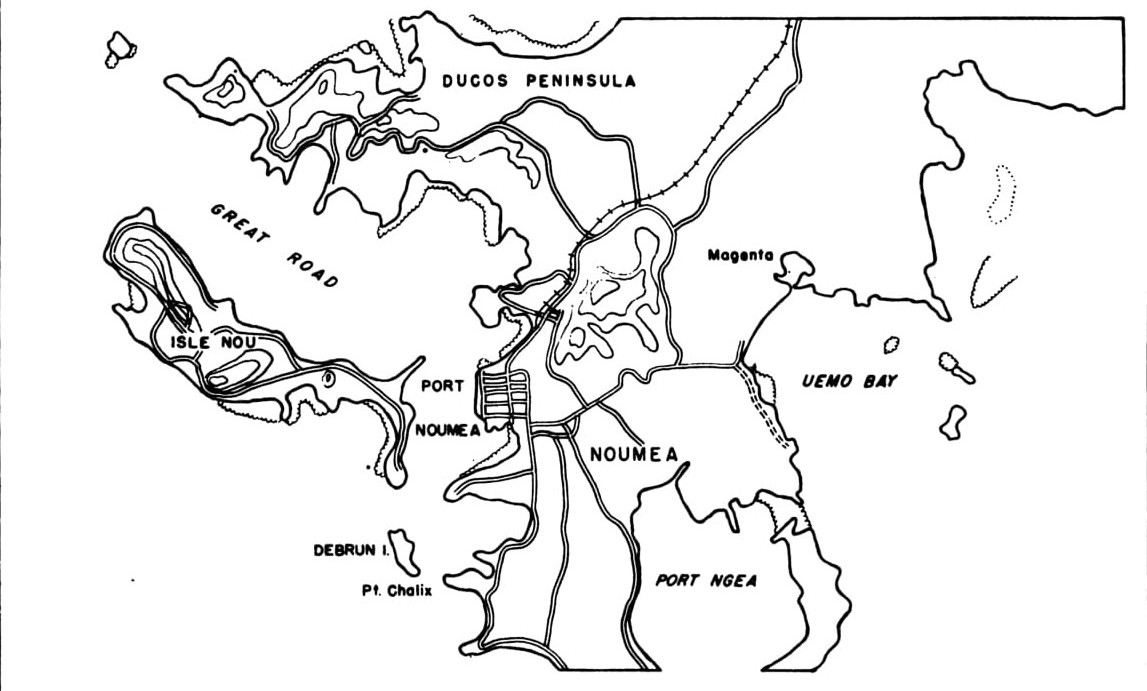
Map of Noumea, New Caledonia and Ile Nou Island

Naval Base Noumea was a major United States Navy sea and air base at Nouméa, New Caledonia. Naval Base Noumea was built at Noumea Harbor. Noumea was picked for a naval base as it was beyond the range of Japanese land-based planes. Noumea is on the east side of the Coral Sea, 1,469 kilometres (913 mi; 793 nmi) from Brisbane, Australia. The base was built during World War II to support the many ships and aircraft fighting and patrolling in the South West Pacific theatre of war as part of the Pacific War. Naval Base Noumea had an anchorage for large ships. Noumea was protected against submarine attack by a ring of islands and naval minefields. At its peak 50,000 troops were stationed at Naval Base Noumea. New Caledonia has been a colony of France since 1853. Nouméa is the capital city of New Caledonia. On November 8, 1942, US Navy South Pacific headquarters moved to Nouméa.

== History ==
In September 1940, New Caledonia joined the Free France organization, founded June 1940 after the Fall of France. In March 1942, an agreement was made between Free France and the United States for a base in New Caledonia.

In July and August 1942, Seabees arrived and began building the naval base. The first project was building a vast fuel tank farm on the Ducos Peninsula, north of Noumea. Naval Base Noumea became the main fuel oil storage depot for the fleet from 1942 to November 1944. The tank farm had storage for 30,000 barrels of fuel oil and 20,000 barrels of diesel. US Navy and United States Merchant Navy tankers brought 225,000 barrels of fuel oil to be stored at Noumea on the Ducos Peninsula. In August 1942, another 225,000 barrels arrived. USS Kanawha was one of the US Navy tankers that arrived; she was sunk on April 8, 1943, by a Japanese plane. The USS Platte and USS Sabine are some of many ships that loaded fuel oil at Naval Base Noumea to replenish fleet ships.

Noumea had a large feet anchorage in Dumbéa Bay, Gadji Bay and Baie de Koutio Kouéta. Aviation, Construction, Ordnance, Repair, Navy (ACORN) arrived at Noumea on September 30, 1942. US Navy Patrol and Reconnaissance Wing 1 arrived on September 19, 1942. Naval Base Noumea also became a major ammunition depot by the fall of 1942 to supply both ships and troops.

The next project was building a base on Ile Nou Island, now called Nouville, just east of the City of Noumea. Nouville had an old fort at the north end, Fort Téréka, and a penal colony that closed officially in 1897, with the last convict removed in 1927. Seabees built what locals called Half-Moon village on the flat south end of the island at 22.268°S 166.419°E. Half-Moon village was named after the shape of the quonset huts and Nissen huts built at the site. In 1987, at the site of Half-Moon village, the University of New Caledonia opened. After the war, about 90 percent of the huts were removed, the other 10% were used for New Caledonia Armed Forces and for low-cost housing, including dance halls and recreation halls. In the center of the island, the Théâtre de l'île was converted into a regrouping center for Japanese civilians on New Caledonia, that were then relocated Australia.

Royal Australian Air Force had built a small seaplane base on Ile Nou. Most Australian Forces returned to Australia and the US Navy took over operations of the seaplane base for Navy patrol planes. Seabees expanded the seaplane base and added more barracks. A Naval Air Transport Service center was built. At the Naval Base, a 75-ton crane was installed for unloading the cargo ships arriving with both base supplies and supplies for the American island hopping campaign. At Naval Base Noumea, cargo unloaded by the new crane included PT boats, barges, LCT-5's, and Lockheed P-38 Lightnings.

On the south side of the island was built 800-foot Nickel Dock for loading and loading ships. Three seven-ton cranes were installed for small cargo. The Navy constructed the Le Grand Quai Dock, spanning 1400 feet, accompanied by a 68,500-square-foot storage depot. Geared towards the Pacific War effort, the infrastructure was instrumental, yet the high demand often led to a backlog of ships waiting to be unloaded. With limited space on the island, construction started on the New Caledonia mainland both north, south, and west of the City of Noumea. At Point Chalix south of the city, the navy built two wharves for unloading barges on a landing. At Point Chalix an aviation supply depot was built. Next construction was in the City of Magenta, to the west of Noumea, two 200-foot wooden piers were built out into Boulari Bay. Also at Magenta, a Navy runway was built, now Nouméa Magenta Airport at 22.259°S 166.4732°E.

The main Seabee units at Noumea were the CBMU 536, 3rd Naval Construction Battalion, Construction Battalion 11 and CBMU 537. Admiral Thomas C. Kinkaid's carrier task force was stationed at Noumea, for the supply and support of the Guadalcanal campaign. A large convoy departed Naval Base Noumea for Guadalcanal on November 8, 1942. Admiral Robert L. Ghormley moved his headquarters to Naval Base Noumea on August 1, 1942. On August 28, 1942, the USS Hornet's task group arrived at Naval Base Noumea. Naval Base Noumea became a major Naval train center for the Fleet. On November 8, 1942, a large convoy departed Noumea to set up a Naval Base at Guadalcanal. Many operations on Noumea slowly moved to Espiritu Santo Naval Base, which opened in 1942 and was closer to the action. By June 1945, Noumea was only a fueling station. On May 27, 1947, Naval Base Noumea closed.

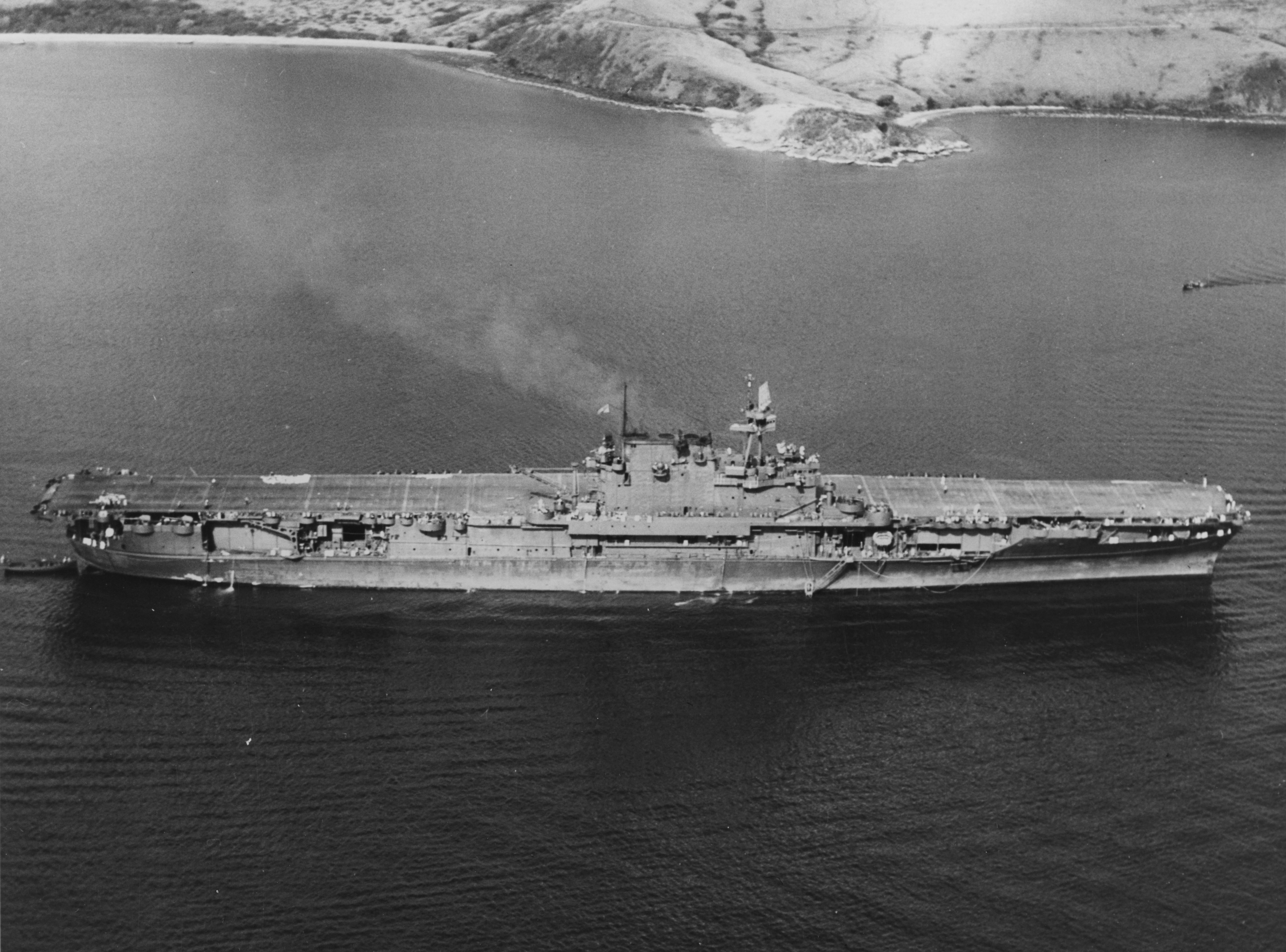
USS Enterprise (CV-6) at Noumea on 10 November 1942, for repairs after the Battle of Santa Cruz

== Ship repair depot ==
Naval Base Noumea had a major ship repair depot. The battleship USS South Dakota was repaired at Noumea after the Battle of the Santa Cruz Islands. After the sinking of USS Hornet (CV-8) and USS Porter the 3,000 survivors were stationed at Naval Base Noumea for recovery for a few days. USS West Point took the survivors back to the States. Auxiliary floating drydock ARD-2 arrived fall of 1942 with repair ships. ARD-2, and added AFD-9, repaired destroyers, submarines, and landing ships, tank (LST). USS Vulcan supported ship repairs. USS Kitty Hawk (AKV-1) and USS Hammondsport (APV-2) unloaded planes and plane parts.

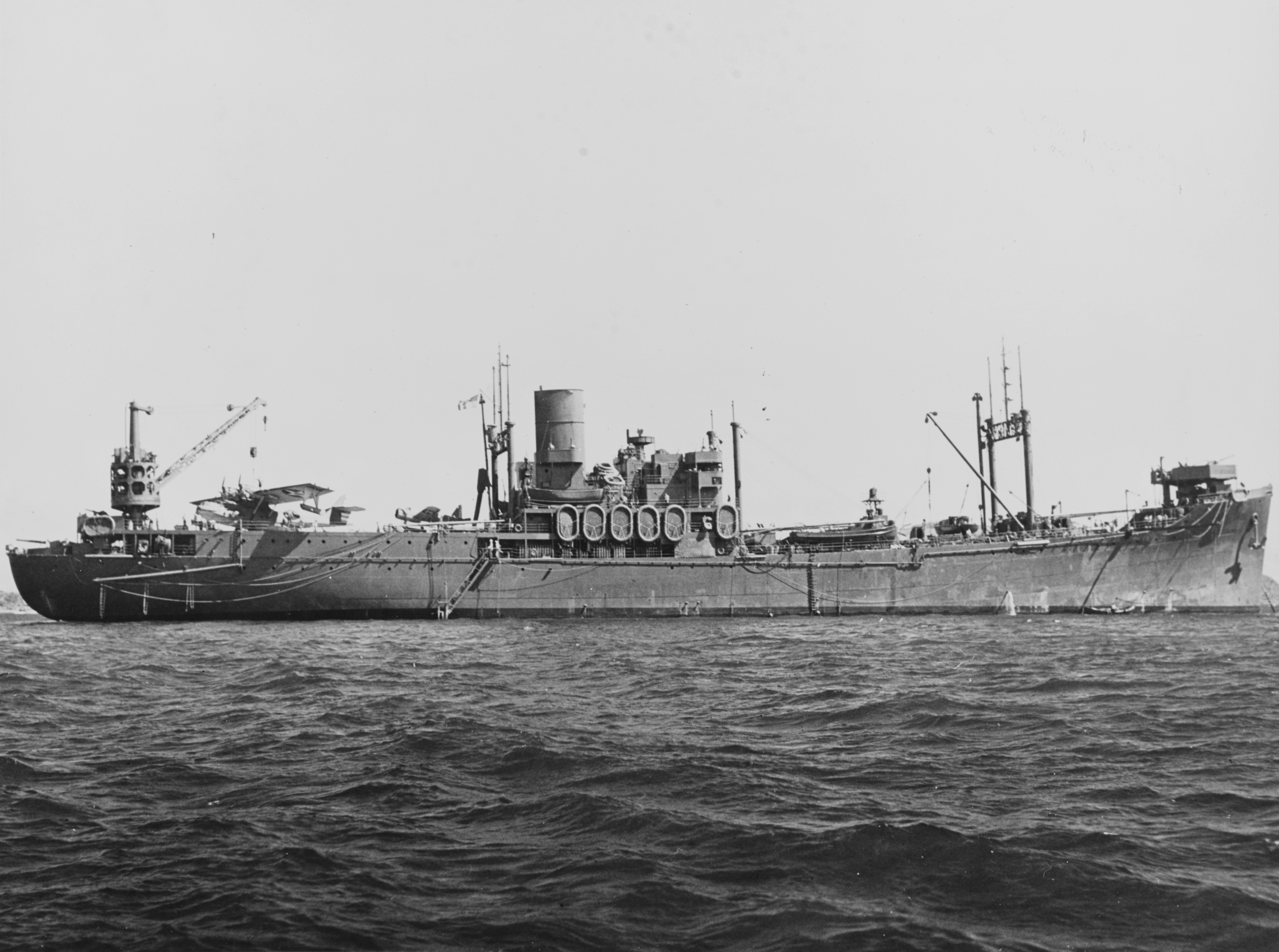
USS Tangier (AV-8) seaplane tender, at Nouméa on 14 April 1942

== Seaplane base ==
The expanded seaplane base at Naval Base Noumea had three US Navy seaplane tenders servicing the seaplanes: USS Curtiss, USS McFarland and USS Mackinac. USS Whitney Dobbin-class destroyer tender and the USS Argonne a Design 1024 cargo ship were station at Noumea in support of the many ships passing through Noumea. Navy unit VP-14 and VP-71 with Consolidated PBY Catalina was stationed at the base.

== 1st Marine base ==
At Naval Base Noumea the Navy built the 1st Marine base depot. The 1st Marine Division used Naval Base Noumea as staging before going to Guadalcanal. The 1st Raider Battalion camped at Noumea . The 19th Battalion built a 300 foot large pier and 200foot pier and warehouses. A special ramp for unloading vehicles was built. 1st Marine Amphibious Corps arrived December 1942. Noumea became a depot and staging area for future operations. On August 25, 1943 First Lady Eleanor Roosevelt visited troops on Noumea.

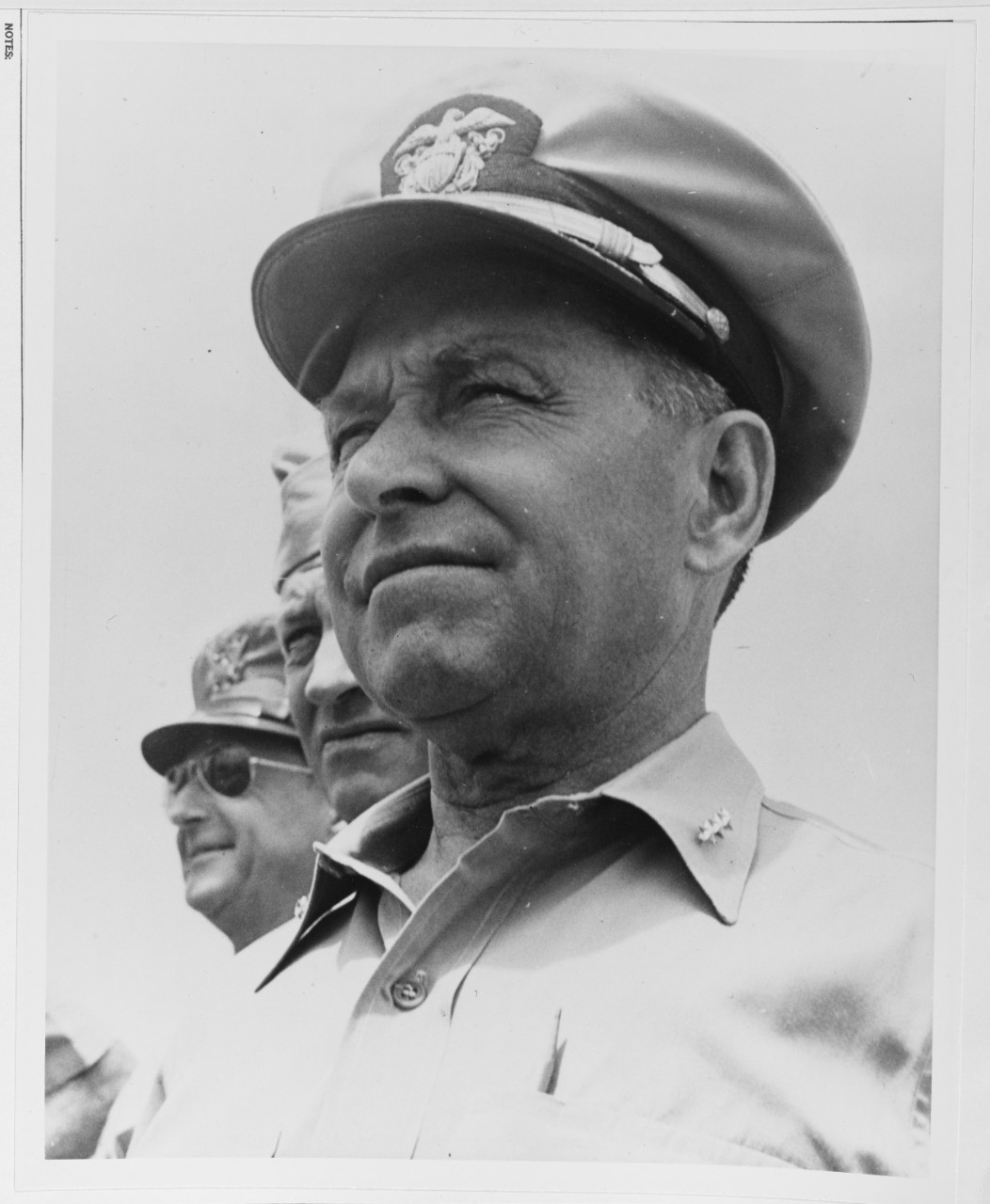
Vice admiral John H. Newton at Noumea

== Facilities ==
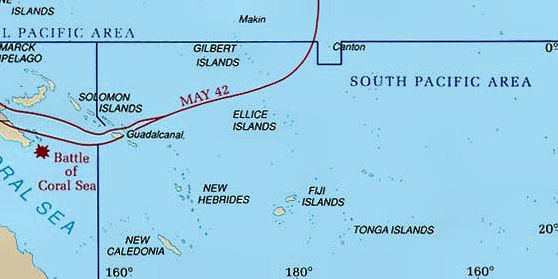
South Pacific islands during World War II, New Caledonia in the lower left

- Large Fleet anchorage
- Marine camp
- Marine training Center
- Ducos Peninsula Tank farm
- Naval Base Noumea had a major mine assembly center.
- Naval Air Transport Service Headquarters
- Naval Fleet hospital MOB 5 with 2,000-bed
- Naval Fleet hospital MOB 7 with 2,000-bed
- Convalescent camp MOB 7
- Aviation supply depot
- Carrier Aircraft Service Unit
- Naval supply depot
- Seabees Camp
- Seabees depot
  - Advanced Base Construction Depot
- Aircraft engine overhaul base
- Ship repair depot with marine railway and ADRs
- Ammunition depot
- Naval auxiliary field, a single fighter runway on Magenta Bay Nouméa Magenta Airport
- Magenta Bay tank farm
- Fleet post office FPO# 131 SF Noumea, New Caledonia
- Pontoon assembly depot, with narrow-gauge railway
- Antiaircraft gunnery school
- Tank farm for aviation gasoline
- Fire-fighting school
- Motion-picture exchanges
- Gas plants
- Mess halls
- Cinema theater
- Recreation Center
- Chapel with a bell tower
- Power stations
- Rock quarry
- Rock crushing plant
- Silica pit
- Gravel pit
- Motorpool
- Amphibious boat pool
- Small boat pool
- Seabees mill and carpenter shop
- Radio stations
- Montravel camp
- Barnes camp
- (Koumac Field US Army Air runway at Koumac)
- (Pier at US Army staging at Neponi, north tip of island)
- Tontouta Airfield now La Tontouta International Airport

== NAB Noumea - Tontouta Airfield ==
Tontouta Airfield, was built at Tontouta, 46.6 km north of Noumea at 22°00′59″S 166°12′58″E. The Australians and the Free French had built two runways at the site the US expanded the runway and facilities. The Tontouta Airfield is now La Tontouta International Airport. The US Navy, United States Army Air Forces and United States Marine Corps used the airbase. At Tontouta Airfield were the 43rd Naval Construction Regiment and Naval Construction Maintenance Unit 534 Tontouta Airfield had a 5,000-foot runway. Tontouta Airfield was very busy in 1942 and 1943. Tontouta Airfield refueling depot for planes in route or departing Australia. Australia was major US Allied Nation in the war. Tontouta Airfield was expanded in early 1943 and Army Air Force Service Command Unit and the 13th Air Depot were stationed there. A Boeing B-17E Flying Fortress named Fiji Foo, Serial Number 41-9217 crashed landed on October 27, 1943, on to the Tontouta Airfield runway. The crew was unhurt in the crash.

U.S. Army Air Force (USAAF) stationed at Tontouta Airfield:

- 347th FG 67th FS (P-39) 1942-1943, then transferred to Kila and Milne Bay
- 403 TCG, 13 TCS (C-47) 1942-1943 then transferred to Naval Advance Base Espiritu Santo
- 403rd TCG, 64th TCS (C-47) 1942-1943 then transferred to Naval Advance Base Espiritu Santo
- USAAF Service Command
- VMF-212 (F4F) 1942 then transferred Efate
- Marine Aircraft Group 25 (MAG-25), Headquarters (C-47) 1944
- 13th Air Depot (13th AD)
- United States Marine Corps (USMC)

== US Army ==
On March 12, 1942 17,500 troops disembark at Noumea' Nickel peninsula. The headquarters of the 23 rd Infantry Division of the US Army (nicknamed Americal Division or Poppy Force), commanded by General Alexander Patch had a headquarters and camp at Anse Vata south of Noumea. Brigadier general William I. Rose was also at the headquarters. US Army had two Hospitals, one at Anse Vata and one at Dumbéa 2 miles inland on the Dumbéa River. On January 1, 1943 the US Army's 24th Construction Battalion started construction of a 600-by-72-foot (183 m × 22 m) wood pier north of the Nickel Dock. The Seabees supplied the pile driver built on a floating crane. The pier was completed January 28. US Army's 67th Pursuit Squadron operated of 25 Curtiss P-40 Warhawk

== Japanese prisoners of war ==
A camp for Japanese prisoners of war was set up at Noumea. The camp also had an interrogation center for Japanese sailors and soldiers.

== Naval Base Nepoui ==
North of Noumea, at Népoui, near the Népoui River US Navy Seabees with 87th built a camp for the US Army, starting in September 1944. The US Army supplied the materials for the staging camp. The 87th have 350 men on the project. The materials was unloaded from Landing Ship, Tanks and trucked inland to the camp. Seabees built a 4-by-12 pontoon floating pier to help in the unloading of material at Nekoro Bay. With the docks completed the camp construction started on October 12. A sawmill was installed and island forests timber was used. The 82nd Seabees Battalion was at the camp for R&R from September 1944 to May 1945. While at the camp the 82nd built a berthing pier that fit two Liberty ships. The staging camp was supported by the nearby Plaine Des Gaiacs Airfield. Naval Base Nepoui Fleet Post Office # was 625.

== Postwar ==
After the war, Tontouta Airfield became the New Caledonia Air Force Base for the French military. Aeronavale (French Naval Aviation) planes were stationed at the Airfield. Aeronavale operated Escadrille 9S transport and patrol aircraft, including Avro Lancaster as late as 1969. Aeronavale also operated a Douglas C-54E Skymaster from Tontouta until it crashed on January 21, 1982.

At Noumea, in 2013, the Museum of the Second World War opened in a large half-moon hut built in 1943 as a warehouse depot.

- New Caledonia Freedom Memorial is an American servicemen was built at Port Moselle at 22°16′39″S 166°26′34″E. Noumea holds annual ceremonies for the American servicemen kept them free.
- New Caledonia Freedom Memorial reads:

In Honor Of The U.S. Forces Who By Their Presence During The Pacific War From March 1942 To February 1946 Insured The Freedom Of New Caledonia. Her People Are Deeply Grateful. August 13, 1992

== See also ==
- Asiatic-Pacific Theater of war
- Seabees in World War II
- Espiritu Santo Naval Base
- US Naval Advance Bases
- Naval Advance Base Saipan
