= Ohland =

Ohland may refer to:

== Individuals ==
- Karen Ohland, American mechanical engineer and museum administrator
- Matthew Ohland, American engineer

== Other ==
- Ohland Bay
