= Tinip River =

River in New Caledonia, France

Coordinates: 20°44′30″S 164°24′57″E

The Tinip River is a river of New Caledonia. It has a catchment area of 12 square kilometres. Tinip River is located between Katavilli Bay and Gomen Bay.

== See also ==
- List of rivers of New Caledonia
