= Kakula =

Kakula may refer to different things:

- Kakula (island), an island of Vanuatu
- an alternative name for a kulintang, a form of music in Indonesia
