= Joseph Kahn =

Joseph Kahn may refer to:

- Joseph Kahn (director) (born 1972), a film and music video director
- Joseph Kahn (journalist) (born 1964), American journalist
- Joseph Kahn (shipping executive) (1916–1979), American businessman

== See also ==
- Joseph Hahn (born 1977), the Linkin Park turntablist
