= USS Cimarron (AO-22) =

Oiler of the United States Navy

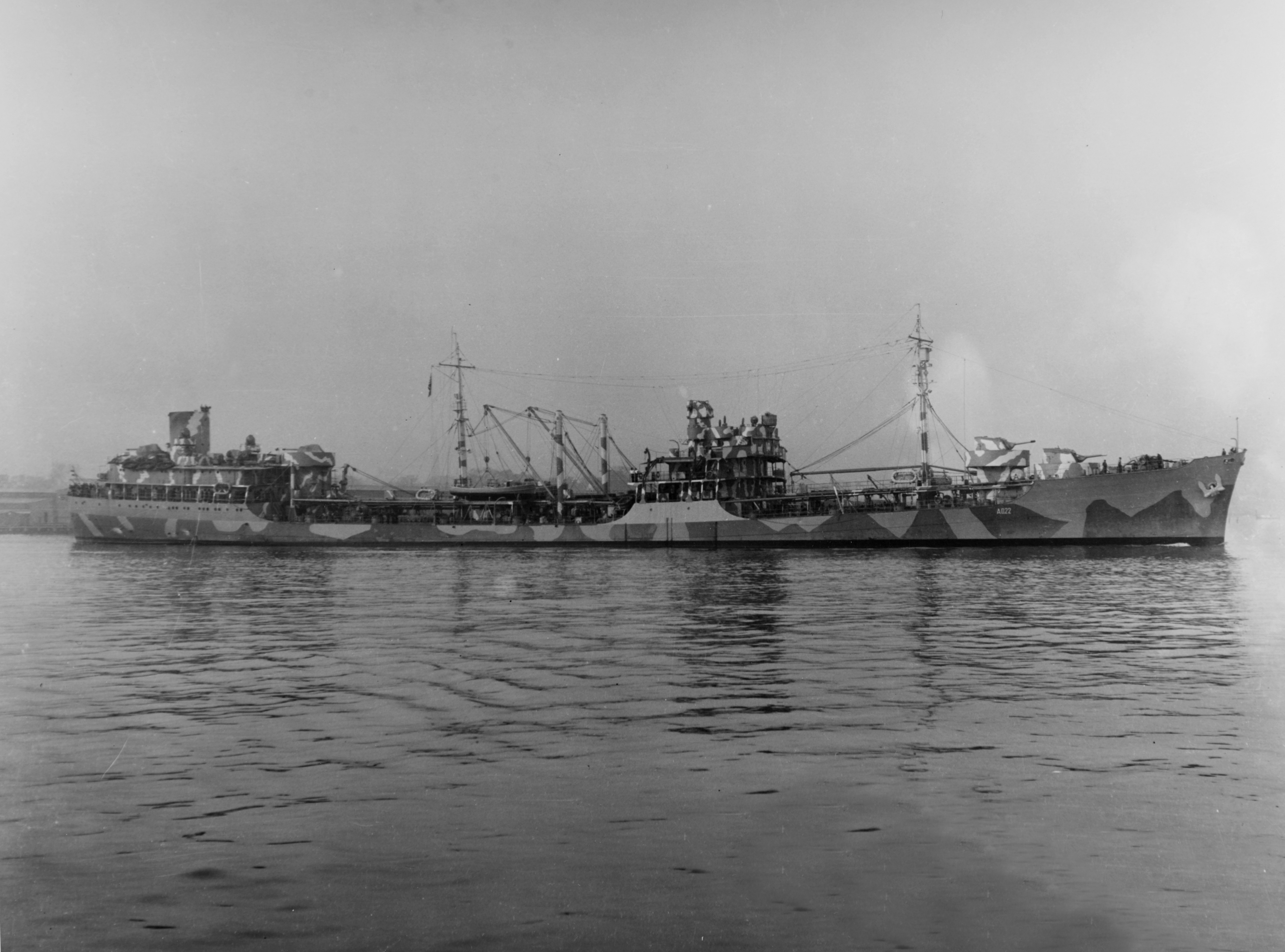
- USS Cimarron (AO-22), off the Norfolk Naval Shipyard, on 6 February 1942

History

United States
- Name: Cimarron
- Namesake: The Cimarron River, in Colorado, New Mexico, Oklahoma, and Kansas
- Ordered: as type (T2-S2-A1) hull, MCE hull 2
- Builder: Sun Shipbuilding and Dry Dock Company, Chester, Pennsylvania
- Cost: $880,250
- Yard number: 172
- Way number: 2
- Laid down: 25 April 1938
- Launched: 7 January 1939
- Sponsored by: Mrs. Louise Harrington Leahy
- Commissioned: 20 March 1939
- Decommissioned: 1 October 1968
- Stricken: 10 October 1968
- Identification: Hull symbol: AO-22; Callsign: NEMQ
- Fate: Transffered to MARAD and sold for scrapping, 15 September 1969

General characteristics
- Class & type: Cimarron-class fleet oiler
- Displacement: 7,470 long tons (7,590 t) light; 24,830 long tons (25,228 t) full load
- Length: 553 ft (169 m)
- Beam: 75 ft (23 m)
- Draft: 32 ft 4 in (9.86 m)
- Propulsion: Twin screws, 30,400 shp (22,669 kW); Steam (600psi), NSFO
- Speed: 18 knots (33 km/h; 21 mph)
- Complement: 304
- Sensors & processing systems: Naval Gunfire Support (NGFS)
- Armament: 4 × 5 in (127 mm)/38 cal. guns; 4 × 40 mm AA guns; 4 × 20 mm AA guns; During Korean War reduced to: 3 × 5 in./38 mounts; 3 in. mounts replaced 20 & 40 mm

Service record
- Operations: World War II, Korean War, Vietnam War
- Awards: 10 battle stars (World War II); 7 battle stars (Korea); 4 campaign stars (Vietnam)

USS Cimarron (AO-22) was the lead ship of the US Navy's Cimarron-class fleet oiler, serving from before World War II until the Vietnam War. She was the second ship to be named for the Cimarron River, that runs through Colorado, New Mexico, Oklahoma, and Kansas.

== Construction and commissioning ==
Cimarron was launched on 7 January 1939 by Sun Shipbuilding and Drydock Company at Chester, Pennsylvania, sponsored by Louise Harrington Leahy, the wife of Admiral William D. Leahy. Cimarron was commissioned on 20 March 1939.

== Service history ==
=== 1939–1941 ===
Cimarron departed Houston, Texas, on 31 May 1939 bound for Pearl Harbor, Territory of Hawaii, arriving there on 21 July 1939. She transported fuel oil between United States West Coast ports and Pearl Harbor, making 13 such voyages until she got underway for the United States East Coast on 19 August 1940. After repairs and alterations, she began oil runs along the United States Gulf Coast and U.S. East Coast, principally between Baton Rouge, Louisiana, and Norfolk, Virginia, until August 1941, when she took part in amphibious operations. From 5 to 16 September 1941 she put to sea with a transport convoy bound for Iceland, and voyaged north again from 12 October to 5 November 1941 to refuel ships at Placentia Bay in the Dominion of Newfoundland. On 15 November 1941, she joined a convoy at Trinidad bound for Singapore with reinforcements.

=== World War II ===
The United States entered World War II with the Japanese attack on Pearl Harbor on 7 December 1941. Cimarron was detached from the Trinidad-Singapore convoy on 9 December 1941 at Cape Town, South Africa. Returning to Trinidad on 31 December 1941, she operated between Brazil and Iceland until 4 March 1942, when she departed Norfolk bound for San Francisco, California, and service in the Pacific campaign.

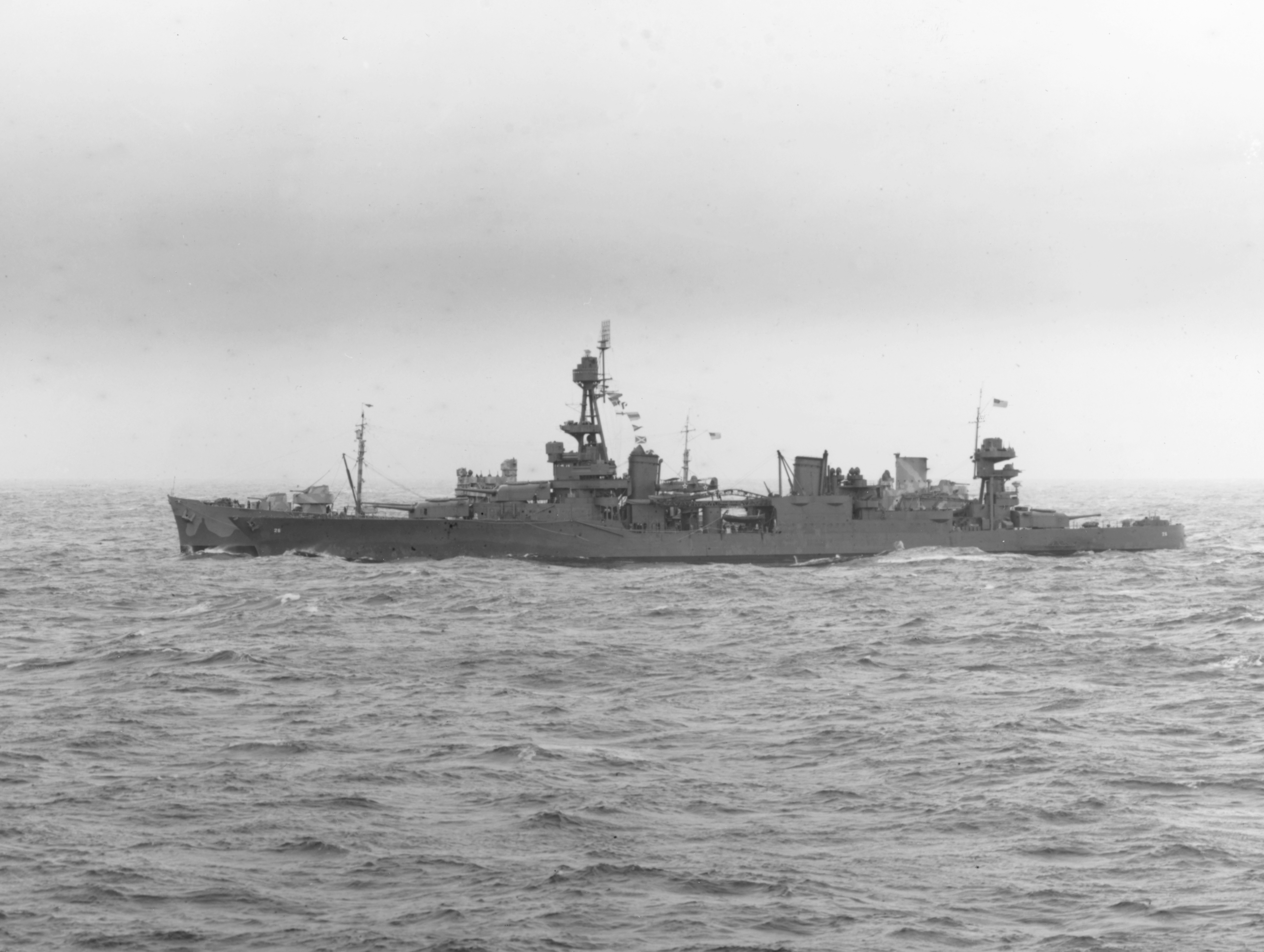
Cimarron refueling Northampton during the Doolittle Raid, 18 April 1942

Cimarron reached San Francisco on 1 April 1942 and departed on 2 April with the U.S. Navy task force that conducted the Doolittle Raid — the first air raid on Tokyo, Japan — on 18 April 1942. With the oiler USS Sabine (AO-25), she refueled the task force at sea before and after the raid and arrived at Pearl Harbor on 25 April 1942. She got back underway on 29 April 1942 to join the Allied forces soon to join battle with the Imperial Japanese Navy in the Battle of the Coral Sea, but she did not arrive in the Coral Sea area until after conclusion of the battle. She refueled destroyers at Nouméa on Grande Terre in New Caledonia, then returned to Pearl Harbor on 26 May 1942.

Cimarron got back underway from Pearl Harbor on 28 May 1942 to fuel the U.S. Navy forces which defeated the Japanese in the Battle of Midway and returned on 12 June 1942. She departed again on 7 July 1942 to support the invasion of Guadalcanal in the southeastern Solomon Islands. Using Nouméa as her principal base, Cimarron occasionally reloaded at Suva in Fiji and Efate in the New Hebrides.

After repairs at San Francisco in November 1942, Cimarron departed for the forward area on 18 December 1942. She operated again from Nouméa in support of the final stages of the Guadalcanal campaign, then operated from Efate, carrying cargo to Sydney, Australia. She returned to fueling operations at Dumbéa Bay in support of the invasion of New Georgia in the central Solomon Islands. She returned to San Francisco in July 1943, then made two trips from the U.S. West Coast to Pearl Harbor.

Cimarron departed Pearl Harbor on 29 September 1943 with a U.S. Navy aircraft carrier task force which raided Wake Island on 5–6 October 1943, and returned to Pearl Harbor on 16 October 1943. She got back underway on 14 November 1943 to fuel in support of the Gilbert Islands campaign, returning to Pearl Harbor on 1 December 1943. She then headed for San Pedro, California, to reload from 12 December 1943 to 4 January 1944. Departing Pearl Harbor on 13 January 1944, she operated from Majuro Atoll, supporting the Marshall Islands campaign in February 1944 and Operation Hailstone, the mid-February 1944 U.S. Navy attack on Truk. On 6 June 1944 she moved to Eniwetok Atoll, from which she supported U.S. forces in the Mariana Islands campaign. On 26 August 1944 she moved to Ulithi Atoll, from which she supported U.S. forces in the Palau Islands campaign.

After an overhaul in the United States from October through December 1944, Cimarron arrived at Ulithi Atoll on 26 December 1944. From 27 December 1944 to 21 January 1945 she fueled the task force launching air attacks on Japanese forces in French Indochina and the Philippines as part of the invasion of Lingayen Gulf on Luzon. She put to sea again from 8 February to 22 March 1945 to support for U.S. Navy air raids on the Japanese Home Islands and the invasion of Iwo Jima. From 26 March to 23 May 1945 she operated from Ulithi Atoll to fuel ships involved in the Okinawa campaign, and from 3 June 1945 she shuttled between Ulithi Atoll and the areas from which U.S. Navy aircraft carrier task forces launched the final series of raids against the Japanese Home Islands.

Hostilities with Japan ceased on 15 August 1945. Cimarron received 10 battle stars for her World War II service.

=== 1946–1950 ===
Cimarron continued to operate from Ulithi Atoll in support of the occupation of Japan until 10 September 1945, when she anchored in Tokyo Bay. She operated in East Asia until 4 February 1946, when she arrived at Terminal Island Naval Shipyard on Terminal Island, California, for overhaul. Between July 1946 and June 1950, Cimarron ferried oil from the Persian Gulf to naval bases in the Mariana Islands and Marshall Islands, occasionally continuing on to the US West Coast.

=== Korean War ===
The Korean War began when North Korea invaded South Korea on 25 June 1950. Cimarron′s first tour of duty in the Korean War, from 6 July 1950 to 3 June 1951, found her fueling ships of the Taiwan Patrol at Okinawa and amphibious warfare ships at Kobe, Japan, and operating from Sasebo, Japan, to fuel task forces in the waters off Korea. Several times she entered the heavily mined waters of the harbor at Wonsan, Korea, to fuel the ships carrying out a lengthy blockade and bombardment of Wonsan.

Returning to the U.S. West Coast, Cimarron served as a training tanker until her second Korean War tour, from 1 August to 10 December 1951. During this time she spent a month at Taiwan fueling the ships on duty in the Formosa Strait, and made three voyages to Korean waters from Sasebo. During 1952, overhaul and training on the U.S. West Coast preceded her third Korean War deployment from 9 April to 5 January 1953, when her duty was similar to that of her second. During her fourth Korean War tour of duty, which began on 11 April 1953.

The Korean War ended in an armistice on 27 July 1953. Cimarron received seven battle stars for her Korean War service.

=== 1953–1965 ===
Cimarron remained in East Asian waters after the end of the Korean War and returned to the United States on 27 November 1953. She departed for East Asia again on 14 June 1954 and served as flagship of the United Nations support group for Operation Passage to Freedom, the evacuation of refugees from communist North Vietnam. She returned to the United States on 8 February 1955. She subsequently made deployments to East Asia in support of the United States Seventh Fleet in 1955, 1956–1957, 1957–1958, 1958–1959, 1959, and 1960. As of 1963, she had the longest continuous commissioned service of any active ship in the U.S. Navy.

=== Vietnam War ===
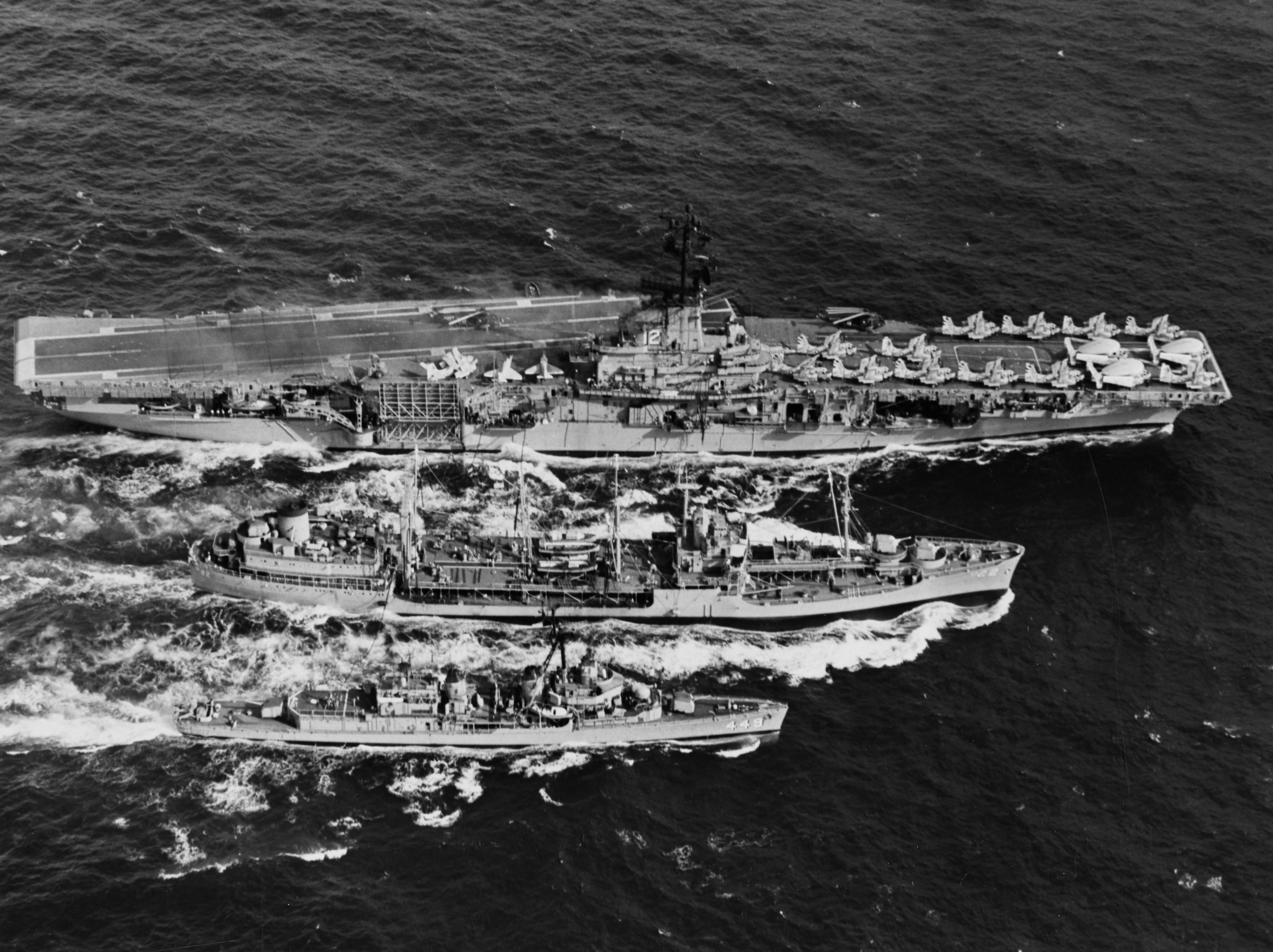
Cimarron replenishing Hornet and Nicholas, ca. 1966

Cimarron served during the Vietnam War between 1965 and 1967. For her participation in the war, she received the Armed Forces Expeditionary Medal and the Vietnam Service Medal with seven service stars, for the Vietnam Advisory Campaign, Vietnam Defense, and Vietnamese Counteroffensive Phases I through III. At the end of her active service in 1968, she was the oldest U.S. Navy ship in continuous active service.

== Disposal ==
Cimarron was decommissioned and struck from the Navy List in October 1968. She was sold for scrapping in 1969.

== Commemoration ==
Cimarron's ship's bell was donated to Cimarron High School in Cimarron, New Mexico, where it was installed to honor the Santa Fe Trail's Cimarron Cutoff and its proximity to the Cimarron River basin's headwaters.

== Awards ==
- Presidential Unit Citation
- China Service Medal
- American Defense Service Medal with "A" device
- American Campaign Medal
- European–African–Middle Eastern Campaign Medal
- Asiatic-Pacific Campaign Medal with 10 battle stars
- World War II Victory Medal
- Navy Occupation Service Medal (with "ASIA" clasp)
- National Defense Service Medal (two awards)
- Korean Service Medal with seven battle stars
- Armed Forces Expeditionary Medal (seven awards)
- Vietnam Service Medal with four service stars
- United Nations Service Medal (United Nations)
- Vietnam Campaign Medal (Republic of Vietnam)
- Korean War Service Medal (Republic of Korea)

== Biography ==
- Priolo, Gary P. (29 November 2024). "USS Cimarron (AO-22)". NavSource.
- Cressman, Robert J. (8 May 2024). "Chenango II (CVE-28)". Dictionary of American Naval Fighting Ships. Navy Department, Naval History and Heritage Command. This article incorporates text from this source, which is in the public domain.
- "Fleet Oiler Cimarron Retires". Clovis News-Journal. Clovis, New Mexico. 1 October 1968. p. 13 – via newspapers.com.
- "Cimarron, Colfax County, New Mexico - Final homeport of USS Cimarron". Roadside New Mexico. 1 October 2014. Archived from the original on 25 October 2014.

== See also ==
- 1936 Merchant Marine Act and MARCOM
- Naval Control And Protection of Shipping (NCAPS)
- Naval War College Simulations - 1936-38 War Plan Orange
- W. W. Behrens, Jr. - US Naval Academy Midshipman, who may have influenced fleet oiler naming protocol with CNO William D. Leahy, whose wife sponsored Cimarron.
- Cimarron Basin Watershed Reducing Elevation Awareness Deficiency (EAD) by adding self-defense gunnery weapons that also enabled independent steaming between fortified fuel storage facilities and more forward fleet operating areas.
