= Nehoue Bay =

Bay in New Caledonia, France

Coordinates: 20°20′10″S 164°8′10″E

Nehoue Bay or Baie de Néhoué is a bay in northwestern New Caledonia. It lies just northwest of Ohland Bay and just southeast of Tanle Bay. The village of Malabou lies on the bay which contains the Malabou Beach Hotel. This resort lies 45 kilometres northwest of Koumac and is noted for its white sands. The bay contains numerous islands, the largest of which is Boh Island. Tanle Island lies just to the west in front of the channel of Tanle Bay. Other islands include Neangambo Island, Ti Island and Ti-Ac Island.
