= Banare Bay =

Bay in New Caledonia, France

Coordinates: 20°9′23″S 164°2′38″E

Banare Bay or Baie de Banare is a bay in far northwestern New Caledonia. It lies northwest of Tanle Bay. Poum lies on the southern part of the bay and Tiabet lies on the northern part. The bay contains several islands. Mouac Island lies just north of Poum, others islands include Pionne Island and Yava Island and further out is the larger Neba Island.
