= Chasseloup Bay =

Bay in New Caledonia

Coordinates: 20°56′56″S 164°38′47″E

Chasseloup Bay or Baie Chasseloup is a bay in northwestern New Caledonia. It lies northwest of Katavilli Bay and southeast of Gomen Bay. The town of Voh lies to the east of the bay. Several rivers empty into the bay. A small coral reef with a least depth of 5 feet lies 1200 yards westward of the middle of the head of Chasseloup Bay. Puangue Channel is westward of Chasseloup bay and forms a curve about 2J miles in length. It is reportedly the only way within the outer reef by which a vessel can pass to the northward. Anchorage in the bay is said to be good.
