= Nguna =

- Island
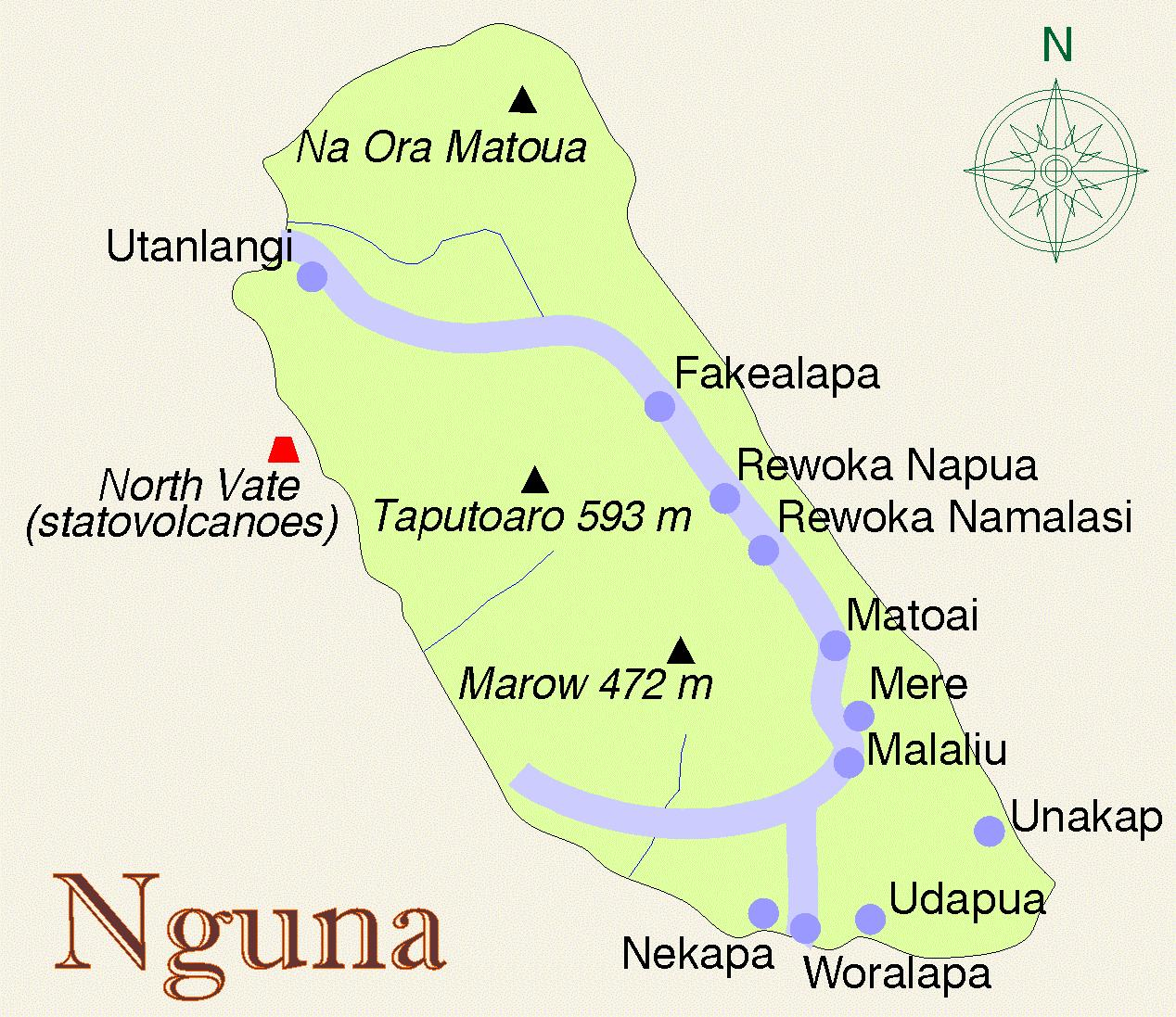

- Location in Vanuatu
- Coordinates: 17°26′S 168°20′E
- Country: Vanuatu
- Province: Shefa Province

Area
  - Total: 24.5 km^{2} (9.5 sq mi)
- Highest elevation: 593 m (1,946 ft)

Population (2009)
  - Total: 1,255
  - Density: 51.2/km^{2} (133/sq mi)
- Time zone: UTC+11 (VUT)

Nguna Island is an outer island off the north coast of Efate, Vanuatu in Undine Bay.

It is neighbored to the east by Pele Island and to the west by Moso Island.

== Geography ==
The island is bisected by two extinct volcano craters, the highest of which is the peak of Mount Taputoara at 593 meters (1,946 ft) tall.

The Nguna-Pele Marine Protected Area Network was established in 2003 as a way to conserve and protect the fragile and unique reef environment around the Nguna and Pele Islands. Sixteen communities on the two islands work together to maintain several small marine and terrestrial closures that have been established by area chiefs, village councils, local NGOs, and the assistance of a Peace Corps volunteer.

== Population ==
Nguna is home to thirteen villages, which are located on the north, east, and south of the island, with west Nguna largely uninhabited. The total population was approximately 1,300 according to the 2009 census.

== Tourism ==
Nguna Island is the most developed Outer Efate Island for tourism with some ten bungalows and guest houses and tours including diving the Nguna Pele Marine Protected Area, turtle tagging, tree house climbing, and hiking the extinct volcano. The accommodation is concentrated in Taloa village, southern Nguna, but there is accommodation in the other villages scattered around Nguna. Nguna can be reached by boat from the Emua Wharf.
