= Katavilli Bay =

Coordinates: 21°5′2″S 164°46′55″E

Katavilli Bay or Baie Katavilli is a bay in northwestern New Caledonia. It lies northwest of Nekoro Bay and southeast of Chasseloup Bay. The village of Pinjen lies just to the northwest of the bay. The Kone River empties into its eastern side.
