= Aoupinieta novaecaledoniae =

Scientific classification
- Kingdom: Animalia
- Phylum: Arthropoda
- Clade: Pancrustacea
- Class: Insecta
- Order: Lepidoptera
- Family: Tortricidae
- Genus: Aoupinieta
- Species: A. novaecaledoniae

Binomial name
- Aoupinieta novaecaledoniae Razowski, 2012

Species of moth

Aoupinieta novaecaledoniae is a species of moth of the family Tortricidae. It was described by Razowski in 2012 and is endemic to New Caledonia.

The wingspan is about 25 millimetres (0.98 in).

== Etymology ==
The species name refers to its country of origin.
