= Tanle Bay =

Bay in New Caledonia

Coordinates: 20°16′26″S 164°4′41″E

Tanle Bay or Baie de Tanle is a bay in northwestern New Caledonia. It lies just northwest of Nehoue Bay, separated only by Tanle Island and Boh Island. Banare Bay lies to the northwest.
