= Ndokoa Gorge =

Gorge in New Caledonia

Coordinates: 21°19′S 165°16′E

Ndokoa Gorge (French: Gorge de Ndokoa) is a gorge in New Caledonia. It lies at an altitude of about 330 metres (1,080 ft) above sea level near Mount Kaala, to the north of the Poya River.
