= Seatrain Lines =

Shipping company

- Type: Incorporation
- Industry: Shipping, transportation
- Founded: 1931 in Hoboken, New Jersey
- Defunct: 1981
- Fate: Bankruptcy
- Successor: C.Y. Tung Group. OOCL
- Area served: Americas, Transpacific
- Subsidiaries: Seatrain Shipbuilding

Seatrain Lines, officially the Over-Seas Shipping Company, was a shipping and transportation company conducting operations in the Americas and trans-Pacific regions. Seatrain Lines began intermodal freight transport in December 1928 by transporting entire loaded railroad freight cars between the United States and Cuba. The specially designed ship Seatrain, built in England, was followed in 1932 by two larger ships built in the United States and in 1939 by two additional ships. By the outbreak of World War II the company was operating five ships that became important in the war effort and basis for the design of fifty new ships for military use. A series of business setbacks amid the rise of containerized shipping left the company in perilous financial condition in the 1970s. Seatrain Lines shut down in 1981 after filing for bankruptcy.

== History ==
Seatrain Lines, the operating name for the Over-Seas Shipping Company, began intermodal container shipping by using entire loaded rail cars between ports in the United States and Havana, Cuba, with the first shipment in December 1928 aboard a specially designed ship, Seatrain. This original ship, built at Swan Hunter & Wigham Richardson, Newcastle and later renamed Seatrain New Orleans, was capable of carrying 95 fully loaded rail cars.

The loading system consisted of a cradle that fit into a depression on the pier. Railway lines running on the pier continued onto the cradle and past it. Rail cars were rolled onto the cradle one at a time, and then lifted by a large overhead crane. The system was very similar to modern intermodal container loading systems, with the exception that it lifted the load from the bottom rather than the top. The crane rolled the cradle over a large hatch slightly longer than the cradle and as wide as the ship. The cradle could be lowered to match one of four internal decks (including the top surface) and moved side-to-side to match one of four parallel sets of rails on the decks. Once positioned, the car was pulled off by steam driven winches. During the voyage of the ship the cars were secured by chocking the wheels and using jacks and turnbuckles at each corner of the car.

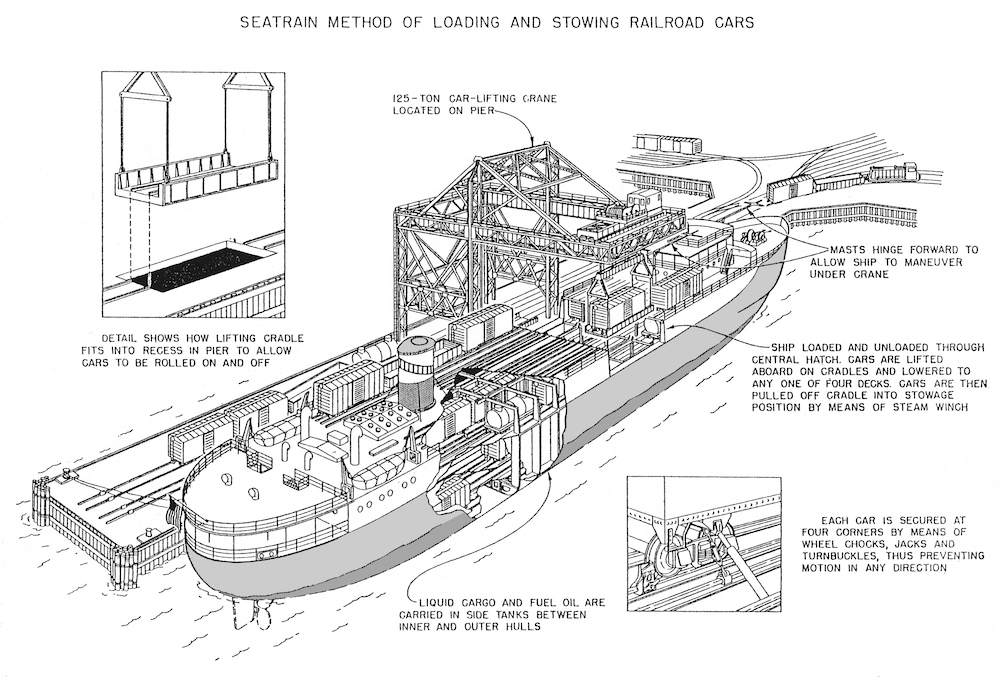
Seatrain's method of loading and stowing railroad cars

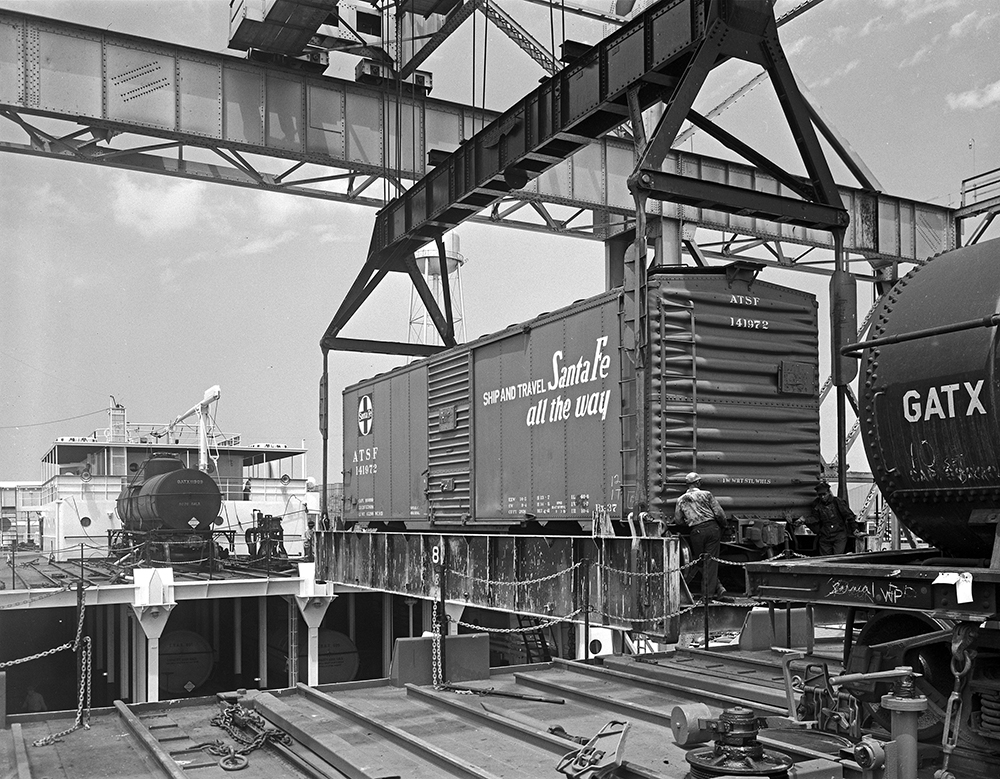
The specialist crane hoist the cradle loaded with an ATSF boxcar from the Seatrain Louisiana.

The company built two larger specialized ships in 1932, Seatrain New York and Seatrain Havana with greater rail car capacity. This service was the forerunner of modern container shipping inaugurated in the late 1950s by other shipping companies. Seatrain was initially located in Hoboken, New Jersey, and owned the Hoboken Manufacturers Railroad that connected its facility to other railroads. In 1939 two more ships were under construction at Sun Shipbuilding and Dry Dock Company, Chester, Pennsylvania, with hulls 191 and 192 becoming Seatrain Texas and Seatrain New Jersey respectively.

In 1944, the five vessels were noted as being unique in the commercial shipping world as described in a decision by the Comptroller General of the United States concerning issues in setting wartime charter rates. The decision noted "these were the only vessels of this type in existence, there was no market for such vessels" and that the "inherent character and design of these vessels which reduces the cost of loading and discharging cargo to a nominal amount per ton, and which by the use of mechanical devices, reduces the time for discharging and reloading to a few hours as compared to a few days" for ordinary ships. Those unique characteristics, though making setting a "market value" difficult, made the ships of particular utility for wartime transport of large, assembled vehicles and machines.

The original 1928 shipment aboard Seatrain caused a labor issue that foretold similar issues later with container ships when Cuban stevedores demanded that they not only unload the rail cars from the ship but unload and repack the rail car contents before turning the cars over to Cuban railways. Seatrain reached agreement with labor but the issue was a precursor to similar labor problems with containers in other ports. In 1951 Seatrain Lines returned to Sun Shipbuilding for two additional railcar carriers, the Seatrain Georgia and Seatrain Louisiana. That year Seatrain also ceased operations to and from Cuba, and renamed its ship Seatrain Havana to Seatrain Savannah to reflect the suspension of service. In 1953 Seatrain sold its operating authority to trade between the US and Cuba to the West India Fruit and Steamship Company, along with its first ship, the Seatrain New Orleans, which was renamed Sea Level.

In 1958, Seatrain Lines introduced its Seamobile intermodal cargo container service, carrying the containers on its railcar-carrying ships between Seatrain's Edgewater terminal on the New Jersey side of New York harbor, and Texas City, Texas. In 1959, Sea-Land Service founder Malcom McLean, a pioneer and leader in intermodal marine-rail-highway containerization, attempted to buy the competing Seatrain Lines, but his offer was rejected. In 1963 Seatrain tried to expand its ship/rail operations with a New York to Puerto Rico run, but this service was severely hampered by the inadequacies of rail transport in Puerto Rico. In addition, Sea-Land Service had introduced containerized service to Puerto Rico in 1958. To compete, Seatrain Lines discontinued the transport of rail cars to Puerto Rico and utilized containers instead.

Transeastern Associates, a firm created in the early 1950s by Joseph Kahn and Howard Pack, bought Seatrain Lines in 1965 for $8.5 million. At the time of their purchase, Seatrain operated between New York and ports in Savannah, Georgia, Texas City, New Orleans and Puerto Rico. Transeastern and its subsidiary Hudson Waterways Corp. were folded into Seatrain in September 1966. At the time, Seatrain had lost more than $500,000 in a four-month period before the merger, while Transeastern's fleet had netted nearly $7 million in a ten-month period.

In 1966, Seatrain began a program to reinvent itself by replacing its aging and obsolete railcar-carrying ships with a fleet of multi-purpose heavy sea-lift ships and cellular container ships. All would be heavily rebuilt from surplus World War II era type T2 tankers and C4 transports obtained by Hudson Waterways through the Maritime Administration (MARAD) ship exchange program. The multi-purpose ships were mainly intended for charter to the Military Sea Transportation Service (MSTS) in support of overseas U.S. military operations, particularly the war in Vietnam, while the container ships would allow Seatrain to containerize its commercial cargo operations.

Seatrain Puerto Rico was the first of the heavy sea-lift ships completed in 1966, followed by Seatrain Carolina, Seatrain Florida, Seatrain Maryland, Seatrain Maine, Seatrain Washington and Seatrain Ohio in 1967. The ships were equipped with two cranes for self-loading and unloading and could carry general bulk and palletized cargo, intermodal containers, and vehicles. The lower and main decks also had embedded rails to allow for carrying railcars, although there is no evidence that any of the ships were ever employed as railcar carriers per se, except for transporting some narrow-gauge rolling stock to Vietnam, in which case the standard-gauge rails could not be used. Elevated spar decks provided additional carrying space for vehicles, aircraft and containers.

Seatrain San Juan was the first of the container ships to be completed in 1967, followed by Seatrain Delaware. The container ships were employed in coastwise U.S. East Coast and Puerto Rico service. In 1969, the Transchamplain, Transontario, Transoneida, Transhawaii, Transidaho, Transindiana and Transoregon were added, allowing Seatrain to expand domestic container service to the U.S. West Coast and Hawaii, and to begin transatlantic service between the U.S. East Coast and the U.K and Northern Europe.

In 1971, Seatrain placed two new high-speed gas turbine-powered container ships in service on its transatlantic route, the German-built Euroliner and Eurofreighter. They were joined in 1972 by the Asialiner and Asiafreighter in anticipation of expanding its transpacific service. On August 17 of that same year, Seatrain, in partnership with the Penn Central and Atchison, Topeka and Santa Fe railroads, also established a pioneering coast-to-coast land bridge rail container service between its U.S. East and West coast terminals, cutting up to 10 days off the transit time between Europe and the U.S. West coast and Asia.

In 1974, Matson Navigation Company took over Seatrain's West Coast–Hawaii service, leasing the Transoneida, Transchamplain and Transontario to handle the traffic. In 1975, Navieras de Puerto Rico, also known as the Puerto Rico Maritime Shipping Authority, took over Seatrain's operations to and in Puerto Rico, along with the ships Transhawaii, Transidaho and Transoregon, which became Navieras' Aguadilla, Carolina, and Mayaguez (often confused with the Sea-Land Service ship of the same name involved in the Mayaguez incident). These two changes left Seatrain to concentrate on its international transatlantic and transpacific operations and replace its original converted container ships, mainly with a fleet of chartered ships, plus the new-builds Seatrain Independence, Seatrain Bennington, Seatrain Chesapeake, Seatrain Oriskany, Seatrain Saratoga, and Seatrain Yorktown.

Struggling to remain solvent in the wake of its disastrous excursion into shipbuilding, a dramatic increase in fuel costs following the Organization of the Petroleum Exporting Countries (OPEC) price increases of the mid-1970s, and the rapid replacement and expansion of its fleet in the late 1970s, and a deepening business downturn, in 1980 Seatrain began divesting its chartered tonnage and cut its rates in the North Atlantic lane to attract more traffic. This set off a rate war which only added to the losses. In August Seatrain sold its transatlantic operations and the ships Seatrain Bennington and Seatrain Saratoga to Trans Freight Lines, and then concentrated on restructuring its Pacific operations under the name Seatrain Pacific Service, or Seapac.

== Bankruptcy ==
Seatrain filed for protection on February 11, 1981, under Chapter 11 with the US Bankruptcy Court for the Southern District of New York. Seatrain's creditors filed $801.25 million in claims but the amount was reduced by negotiation. The final figure was in the area of $515 million. Seatrain's largest unsecured creditors were the pension and welfare fund of the New York Shipping Association-International Longshoremen's Association, the US Economic Development Administration, and Union Carbide Corporation. Seatrain's remaining Pacific operations and assets were sold to Tung Chao Yung's C.Y. Tung Group and Seapac was ultimately merged into Tung's Orient Overseas Container Line (OOCL), with its remaining ships going to OOCL and Dart Container Line.

== Ship usage in World War II and Vietnam ==
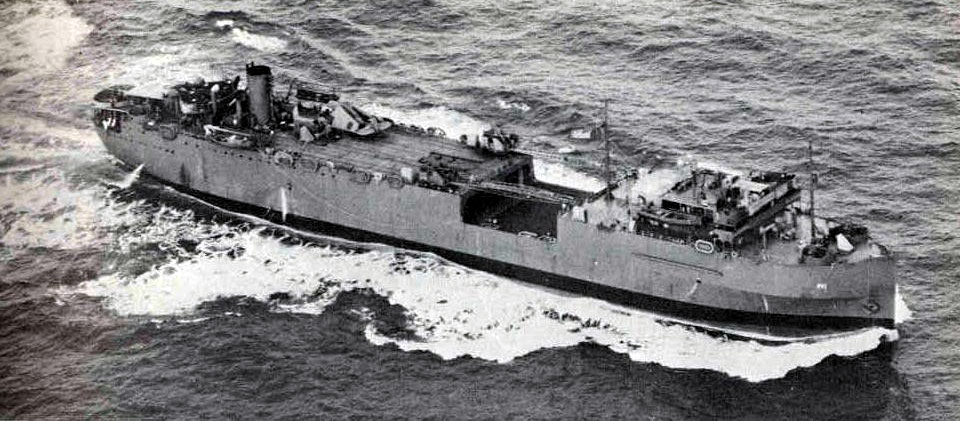
Seatrain New York as USS Kitty Hawk (AKV-1).

The five Seatrain vessels were considered by military planners in 1941 as the need for specialized ships capable of handling fully assembled aircraft, tanks, locomotives, and other vehicles was foreseen. Shortly after the entry of the United States into the war the Army arranged for the construction of fifty C-4 freighters modelled on the Seatrain concept.

The five ships were requisitioned with title passing to the War Shipping Administration (WSA) for two vessels in July 1941, another in February 1942 and the remaining two in May 1942. Under a law effective 24 March 1943 the Administrator of WSA was authorized to return the vessels to the original owners as long as their use satisfies wartime needs. This was done, though there was difficulty in establishing fair rates of charter for unique vessels.

Seatrain Texas and Seatrain New Jersey, after brief service with the Navy as USS Lakehurst, became Army transports specializing in such heavy lift, partly for tanks but also railway locomotives. Seatrain New York continued service with the Navy as USS Kitty Hawk until decommissioned and returned to the line 24 January 1946. Just prior to being converted to U.S. Navy use as the USS Lakehurst, the already greatly battle scarred Seatrain New Jersey was described as “Notorious for being shot up more than any other U.S. merchant ship. Had many symbols of rockets and mortar bombs painted on her bridge wing, each denoting an attack.” Seatrain Havana, acquired by Navy on a bareboat basis from the Maritime Commission, was commissioned as USS Hammondsport (APV-2) 11 December 1941 until 7 March 1946.

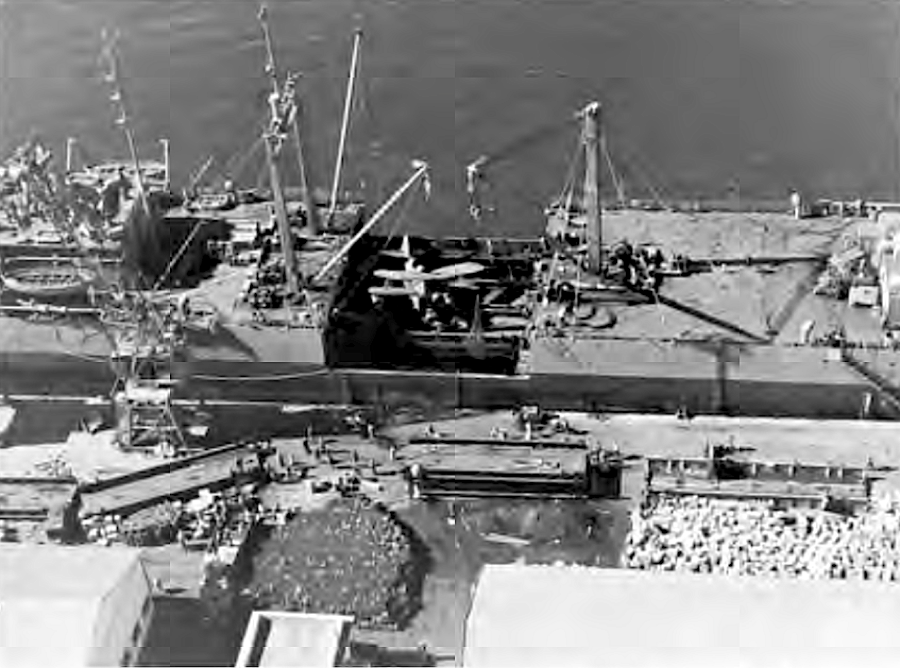
Lakehurst, formerly Seatrain New Jersey, loading damaged U.S. Navy scout plane after discharging medium tanks at Safi, French protectorate in Morocco.

The designed capability to handle such large and heavy cargo as loaded rail cars made the ships critical in transport of assembled military equipment. Under command of Cmdr. Harold "H.J." McNulty (USN), Seatrain New Jersey as USS Lakehurst (one battle star WWII) participated in the Allied invasion of North Africa as part of the fleet's Southern Attack Group. She after made multiple additional voyages from United States ports to North Africa with Army cargo and occasionally troops before transfer to the Army to continue in similar service. Seatrain New York as USS Kitty Hawk operated in the Pacific mainly as an aircraft transport. Kitty Hawk rushed the 3d Marine Defense Battalion and planes of Marine Air Groups to Midway Island when intelligence indicated a Japanese attack there. The ship transported aircraft and supplies to support the campaigns in the Southwest Pacific for the remainder of the war. Hammondsport, the former Seatrain Havana, transported PT boats from New York to San Francisco and then remained in the Pacific largely transporting assembled aircraft as in the case of Kitty Hawk.

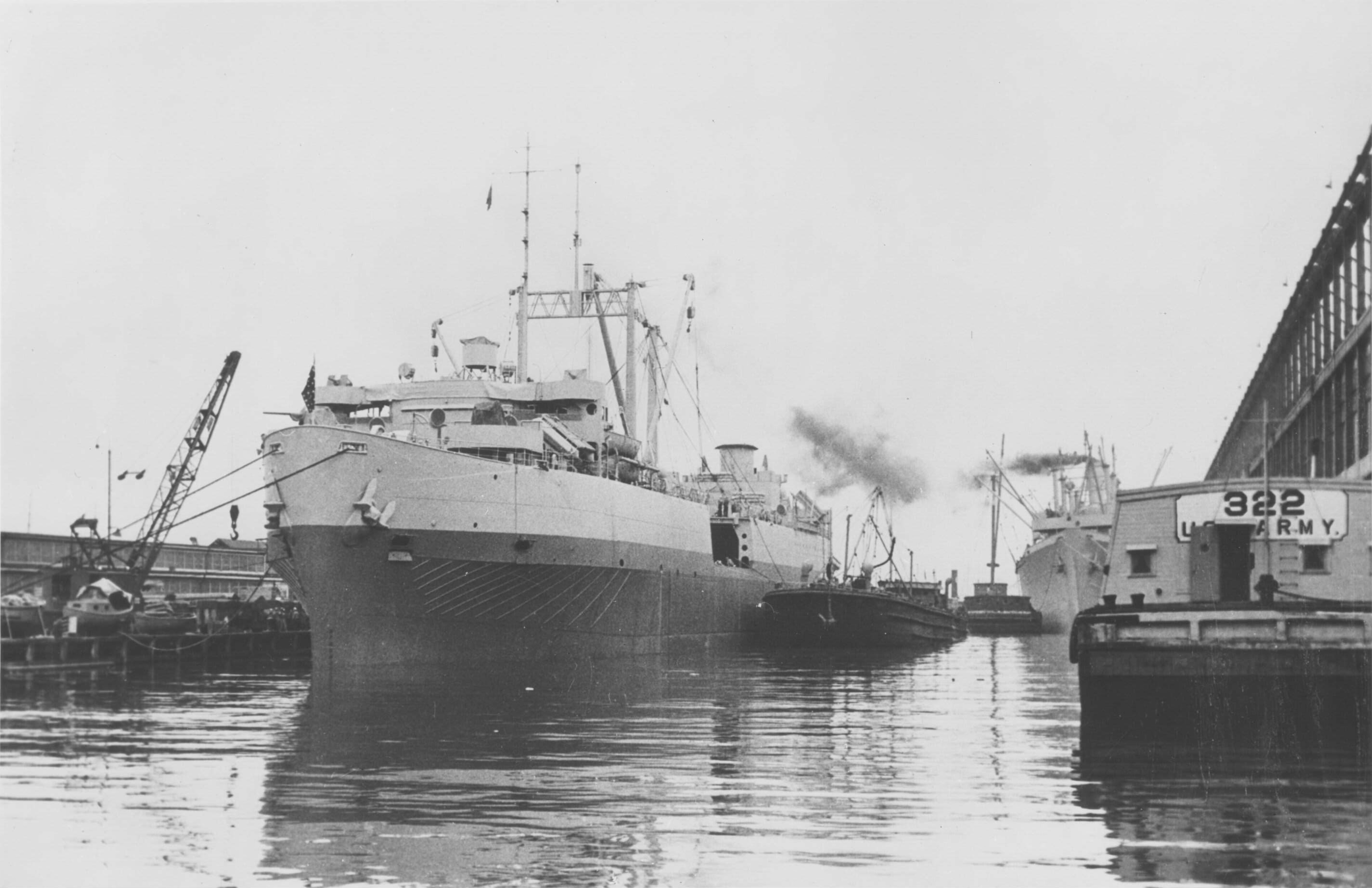
The USAT Seatrain Texas during World War II

An early extraordinary demand came when, responding to an urgent British request on July 13, 1942 for tanks and artillery to counter Rommel after the fall of Tobruk, a convoy of six fast freighters was loaded at the New York Port of Embarkation (NYPOE) for Egypt with 300 medium tanks, 100 tank destroyers, and about 13,000 tons of ammunition. Fifty-two tanks, eighteen self-propelled guns and other supplies were lost when SS Fairport was sunk and NYPOE located replacement armor and ammunition, loaded and dispatched Seatrain Texas within forty-eight hours to sail unescorted, taking 18 days to Cape Town, until joined by a Free French escort at Durban as escort as far as Somalia. Seatrain Texas, again sailing unescorted and under the British code name "Treasure Ship," arrived at Port Taufiq on 2 September where the fully assembled tanks were unloaded and operational on 23 October at the Battle of El Alamein. The ship remained in Army service as USAT Seatrain Texas until redelivered to the line on 23 May 1946.

Seatrain New Orleans, the original Seatrain ship, was transferred to the War Shipping Administration (WSA) on 21 May 1942 and operated until 6 June 1946 by Seatrain Management Corporation as agent for WSA.

Several Seatrain ships were employed in support of the U.S. war effort in Vietnam. Seatrain's seven multi-purpose heavy sea-lift ships were specifically intended for charter to the Military Sea Transportation Service (MSTS), and several if not all of the ships carried material and equipment to Vietnam. In addition, at least three of Seatrain's aging railcar carriers were also chartered to MSTS for carrying supplies and material to the theater, often traveling up the Nha Be River to Saigon to unload, where they were sometimes exposed to hostile action. Seatrain Texas was damaged by a floating mine in December 1967, while Seatrain New Jersey was hit by direct fire on multiple occasions.

After the end of the conflict Seatrain's two newest railcar carriers and all seven sea-lift ships were laid up in the National Defense Reserve Fleet (NDRF), with some of them periodically reactivated for Reforger exercises to transport military vehicles and equipment to Germany. In 1990 Seatrain Washington and Seatrain Maine were reactivated one last time in support of the Persian Gulf War.

== Seatrain Shipbuilding ==
In 1967, Seatrain Lines announced it would establish a new shipyard inside the Brooklyn Navy Yard in New York. In doing so, they ended their 20-year contract with the New York, Susquehanna and Western Railway (NYS&W) to operate at their Edgewater yard, and since the railway had been losing money, their owner at the time, Irving Maidman, sued Seatrain for $4.8 million in compensatory damages. Seatrain Shipbuilding was established in 1968 and signed a lease at Brooklyn Navy Yard in 1969. Seatrain Lines had no previous shipbuilding experience but planned to build and charter out 5 VLCC's and 7 container ships for themselves. Seatrain Shipbuilding built 4 VLCC's, 8 barges, and one Ice Breaker Barge. They started work on the burned out hull of the Sea Witch to turn into a chemical tanker (which was later finished at Newport News).

The U.S. federal government, by way of the Economic Development Administration of the United States Department of Commerce, advanced Seatrain $5 million in direct loans and guaranteed 90% of $82 million in loans from Chase Manhattan Bank. Seatrain Lines injected $38 million of its own money into the project. The union chosen to represent the shipyard production workers was the United Industrial Workers of North America.

Seatrain built four 220,000-ton Very Large Crude Carrier (VLCC) supertankers, eight barges, one ice breaker barge and two roll-on/roll-off (Ro-Ro) ferries. One of the Ro-Ro ferries was never finished and was scrapped. Seatrain Shipbuilding also had a contract to rebuild the burned out hull of the Sea Witch into a chemical tanker.

For all four supertankers, Seatrain arranged for various subsidiaries to purchase steam turbines from Transamerica Corporation subsidiary Delaval for the ships' propulsion systems. The turbines for the first three supertankers turned out to be defective; the turbines on the fourth supertanker did not repeat those defects but still malfunctioned on the maiden voyage because the astern pressure valve had been installed backward. The resulting product liability lawsuit went up to the U.S. Supreme Court in 1986, which unanimously ruled against Seatrain.

On January 20, 1975, Seatrain Shipbuilding started to lay off half of its 3,200 workers for an indefinite period of time. A few days later, the rest of the shipbuilders would receive their layoff notices, as well. The mass layoff was due to President Gerald Ford's pocket veto of the cargo preference bill. Twenty of the largest shipyards in the U.S. would experience similar layoffs.

The cargo preference bill would have required over time 20% of all the oil transported into the U.S. be transported on U.S. Flagged Tankers. President Ford called the bill inflationary. The cost of a gallon of gas would slowly rise by 20 cents over a few years. A few weeks later President Ford called for a $4 per 42-gallon barrel tax on imported oil. This would have increased the cost of gasoline and heating oil derived from imported crude by $0.10 per gallon. New England complained people would no longer be able to afford heating oil. The $4 tax went nowhere.

== Containerization ==
Containerization allowed tremendous cost saving versus break bulk cargo, where each piece of cargo had to be loaded and unloaded individually. Malcom McLean, who founded the pioneer container line Sea-Land Service in 1956, conceived the concept of containerization while sitting in his truck at the port waiting for a ship to be unloaded. Simply put, his idea was to separate the truck's "box" from its chassis and wheels and load the entire "box" with its cargo inside onto the ship, thus speeding up loading and unloading of ships. It would also dramatically increase ship productivity by reducing ship idle time, and reduce damage and pilferage of cargo at the same time.

The key to the container revolution was standardized containers which could be stacked several high in the holds and on top of the hatch covers of a ship. The containers were relatively large since costs tend to be per container and not per tonne, and the dimensions were initially chosen to suit highway limits and rail bridges and tunnels; container sizes have since grown taller which has created problems with some smaller tunnels.

Seatrain Lines first began handling intermodal containers in 1958 when it introduced its Seamobile container service. These first proprietary containers were 27 feet long, a size unique to Seatrain (and later to Matson when that line took over Seatrain's operations in Hawaii). Seatrain carried its containers on rail dollies on the lower decks of its equally unique railcar carrier ships and stacked two-high on the top deck. Seatrain began using 40 foot containers in the early 1960s, but they were of another proprietary design favored by the Missouri Pacific and Baltimore and Ohio railroads. Seatrain began using standard ISO-type 40 foot containers when the line placed its first cellular container ships in service in 1967, although it continued to use the 27 foot size in its Hawaiian service.

== In popular culture ==
In the 1971 Hawaii Five-O episode "For a Million... Why Not?", the means of transport out of Hawaii for a stolen armored truck was a Seatrain container.

In the 1972 Hawaii Five-O episode "Death Wish on Tantalus Mountain", the means of transport to Hawaii for a race car was a Seatrain container.

== Sources ==
- "An Atlantic Coast Port". The Brooklyn Daily Eagle. December 9, 1945. pp. 3–4.
- Colton, T. (March 28, 2014). "Sun Shipbuilding, Chester PA". ShipbuildingHistory.
- Cudahy, Brian J. (2006). Box Boats: How Container Ships Changed the World. New York: Fordham University Press. ISBN 0823225682. LCCN 2006005904.
- Hendrickson, David (2005), "From Boxcars to Boxships: The Ships of Seatrain Lines", Steamboat Bill No.254, Steamship Historical Society of America, pp. 89–102
- Levinson, Marc (2006). The Box: How the Shipping Container Made the World Smaller and the World Economy Bigger. Princeton, N.J.: Princeton University Press. ISBN 9780691123240. LCCN 2005030021.
- Lloyds (1930). "Lloyd's Register (1930–31)" (PDF). Lloyd's Register (through PlimsollShipData).
- Lloyds (1937). "Lloyd's Register (1937–38)" (PDF). Lloyd's Register (through PlimsollShipData).
- Maritime Administration. "Seatrain New Orleans". Ship History Database Vessel Status Card. U.S. Department of Transportation, Maritime Administration. Archived from the original on November 13, 2014.
- Maritime Administration. "Seatrain Texas". Ship History Database Vessel Status Card. U.S. Department of Transportation, Maritime Administration.
- Mohowski, Robert E. (Spring 2011). "Seatrain: Railroad or steamship line?". Classic Trains Magazine. 12 (1). Kalmbach: 64–73.
- Naval History And Heritage Command. "Hammondsport". Dictionary of American Naval Fighting Ships. Naval History And Heritage Command. Archived from the original on March 14, 2004.
- Naval History And Heritage Command. "Kitty Hawk". Dictionary of American Naval Fighting Ships. Naval History And Heritage Command. Archived from the original on March 2, 2004.
- Naval History And Heritage Command. "Lakehurst". Dictionary of American Naval Fighting Ships. Naval History And Heritage Command. Archived from the original on March 17, 2004.
- "Sun Shipbuilding and Dry Dock Company". Pacific Marine Review. Pacific American Steamship Association / Shipowners' Association of the Pacific Coast: 66. December 1939.
- "Seatrain Called Most Unusual Ship Afloat" (pdf). Popular Mechanics. September 1932.
- Trezza, Frank J. (2007). Brooklyn Steel-Blood Tenacity. Baltimore: PublishAmerica. ISBN 978-1-4241-8273-2.
- Wardlow, Chester (1956). The Technical Services—The Transportation Corps: Movements, Training, And Supply. United States Army In World War II. Washington, DC: Center Of Military History, United States Army. LCCN 55060003.
- Warren, Lindsay C. (1944). "Decisions of the Comptroller General of the United States (July 1, 1943 to June 30, 1944)". 23. Washington, D.C.: General Accounting Office.
- Zimmerman, Dwight Jon (29 July 2012). "Seatrain Texas to the Rescue". Defense Media Network. Faircount Media Group.
