= Aoupinieta =

Scientific classification
- Kingdom: Animalia
- Phylum: Arthropoda
- Clade: Pancrustacea
- Class: Insecta
- Order: Lepidoptera
- Family: Tortricidae
- Tribe: Archipini
- Genus: Aoupinieta; Razowski, 2012

Genus of moths

Aoupinieta is a genus of moths belonging to the subfamily Tortricinae of the family Tortricidae.

== Species ==
- Aoupinieta hollowayi Razowski, 2012
- Aoupinieta mountpanieae Razowski, 2013
- Aoupinieta novaecaledoniae Razowski, 2012
- Aoupinieta obesa Razowski, 2013
- Aoupinieta setaria Razowski, 2013
- Aoupinieta silacea Razowski, 2013

== Etymology ==
The generic name refers to Mount Aopinie, the type locality of the type-species.

== See also ==
- List of Tortricidae genera
