= Poya River =

River in New Caledonia

Coordinates: 21°15′52″S 165°17′18″E

The Poya River is a river of western-central New Caledonia. Its source lies near Mount Aopinie. The town of Poya lies on the river bank not far from the sea. The river mouth at Poya Bay is characterised by large mangroves. The Ndokoa Gorge lies to the north of the Poya River.

== See also ==
- List of rivers of New Caledonia
