= Aoupinieta mountpanieae =

Scientific classification
- Kingdom: Animalia
- Phylum: Arthropoda
- Class: Insecta
- Order: Lepidoptera
- Family: Tortricidae
- Genus: Aoupinieta
- Species: A. mountpanieae

Binomial name
- Aoupinieta mountpanieae Razowski, 2013

Species of moth

Aoupinieta mountpanieae is a species of moth of the family Tortricidae. It is found in New Caledonia in the south-west Pacific.

The wingspan is 20–30 mm.

The species name refers to Mont Panié.
