= Aoupinieta hollowayi =

Scientific classification
- Kingdom: Animalia
- Phylum: Arthropoda
- Clade: Pancrustacea
- Class: Insecta
- Order: Lepidoptera
- Family: Tortricidae
- Genus: Aoupinieta
- Species: A. hollowayi

Binomial name
- Aoupinieta hollowayi Razowski, 2012

Species of moth

Aoupinieta hollowayi is a species of moth of the family Tortricidae. It is found in New Caledonia. The habitat consists of rainforests, where it has been recorded at altitudes between 250 metres (820 ft) and 520 metres (1,710 ft).

The wingspan is about 23 millimetres (0.91 in).
