= Aoupinieta silacea =

Scientific classification
- Domain: Eukaryota
- Kingdom: Animalia
- Phylum: Arthropoda
- Class: Insecta
- Order: Lepidoptera
- Family: Tortricidae
- Genus: Aoupinieta
- Species: A. silacea

Binomial name
- Aoupinieta silacea Razowski, 2013

Species of moth

Aoupinieta silacea is a species of moth of the family Tortricidae. It is found in New Caledonia in the south-west Pacific Ocean.

The wingspan is about 36 mm.
