= USS Kitty Hawk (AKV-1) =

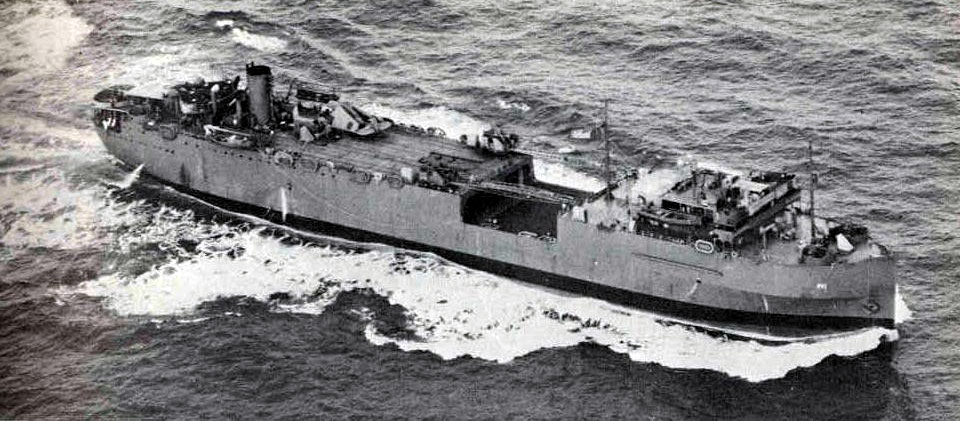
- USS Kitty Hawk (AKV-1) underway in 1942

History

United States
- Name: USS Kitty Hawk
- Namesake: Kitty Hawk, North Carolina
- Builder: Sun Shipbuilding & Drydock Co., Chester, Pennsylvania
- Laid down: 1932, as SS Seatrain New York
- Launched: 14 September 1932
- Acquired: 25 June 1941
- Commissioned: 26 November 1941 as APV-1 (Transport and Aircraft Ferry)
- Decommissioned: 24 January 1946
- Renamed: Kitty Hawk, 8 July 1941
- Reclassified: AKV-1 (Aircraft Transport), 15 September 1943
- Stricken: 24 January 1946
- Identification: IMO number: 5316911
- Fate: Returned to owner, 24 January 1946; Scrapped 1973

General characteristics
- Type: Aircraft transport
- Displacement: 16,480 long tons (16,740 t) full load
- Length: 478 ft (146 m)
- Beam: 63 ft 6 in (19.35 m)
- Draft: 26 ft 4 in (8.03 m)
- Installed power: 8,800 shp (6,600 kW)
- Propulsion: 1 × Geared steam turbine; 1 × shaft
- Speed: 17 kn (20 mph; 31 km/h)
- Complement: 245 officers and enlisted
- Armament: 1 × 5 in (130 mm)/38 cal gun, 4 × 3 in (76 mm)/50 cal guns, 4 × 40 mm guns (2x2), 24 × 20 mm AA cannons (8x2, 16x1)
- Aircraft carried: Ferried a variety of aircraft, mainly fighter types

USS Kitty Hawk (APV-1/AKV-1), formerly SS Seatrain New York, was a cargo ship that was converted into an aircraft transport during World War II.

Seatrain New York was built in 1932 by Sun Shipbuilding & Drydock Corporation of Chester, Pennsylvania for Seatrain Lines, Inc. She was acquired by the United States Navy on 25 June 1941, and renamed Kitty Hawk on 8 July. She was named after Kitty Hawk, North Carolina where the Wright brothers made the world's first powered heavier than air flight on 17 December 1903. She was converted to an aircraft transport by Tietjin & Land Dry Dock Corporation, Hoboken, New Jersey and commissioned on 26 November 1941, at New York Navy Yard.

== Service history ==
=== 1941–1942 ===
After shakedown, Kitty Hawk departed New York on 16 December 1941, for Hawaii via the Panama Canal with aircraft to replace U.S. losses in the Japanese attack, and arrived at Pearl Harbor on 8 February 1942. She unloaded her aircraft at Hickam Field and returned to the mainland on 25 February. Kitty Hawk returned to Pearl Harbor on 17 May. Intelligence reports arrived indicating that a Japanese fleet was approaching the Hawaiian Islands. Immediately, Kitty Hawk loaded the men, armament, and equipment of the 3rd Marine Defense Battalion and aircraft of Marine Air Groups 21 and 45 and sailed at top speed to reinforce Midway, escorted by the destroyer Gwin. En route, a PBY Catalina reported a submarine in the area which Gwin drove off with a heavy barrage of depth charges, enabling Kitty Hawk to deliver her vital fighting men and aircraft to Midway on 26 May.

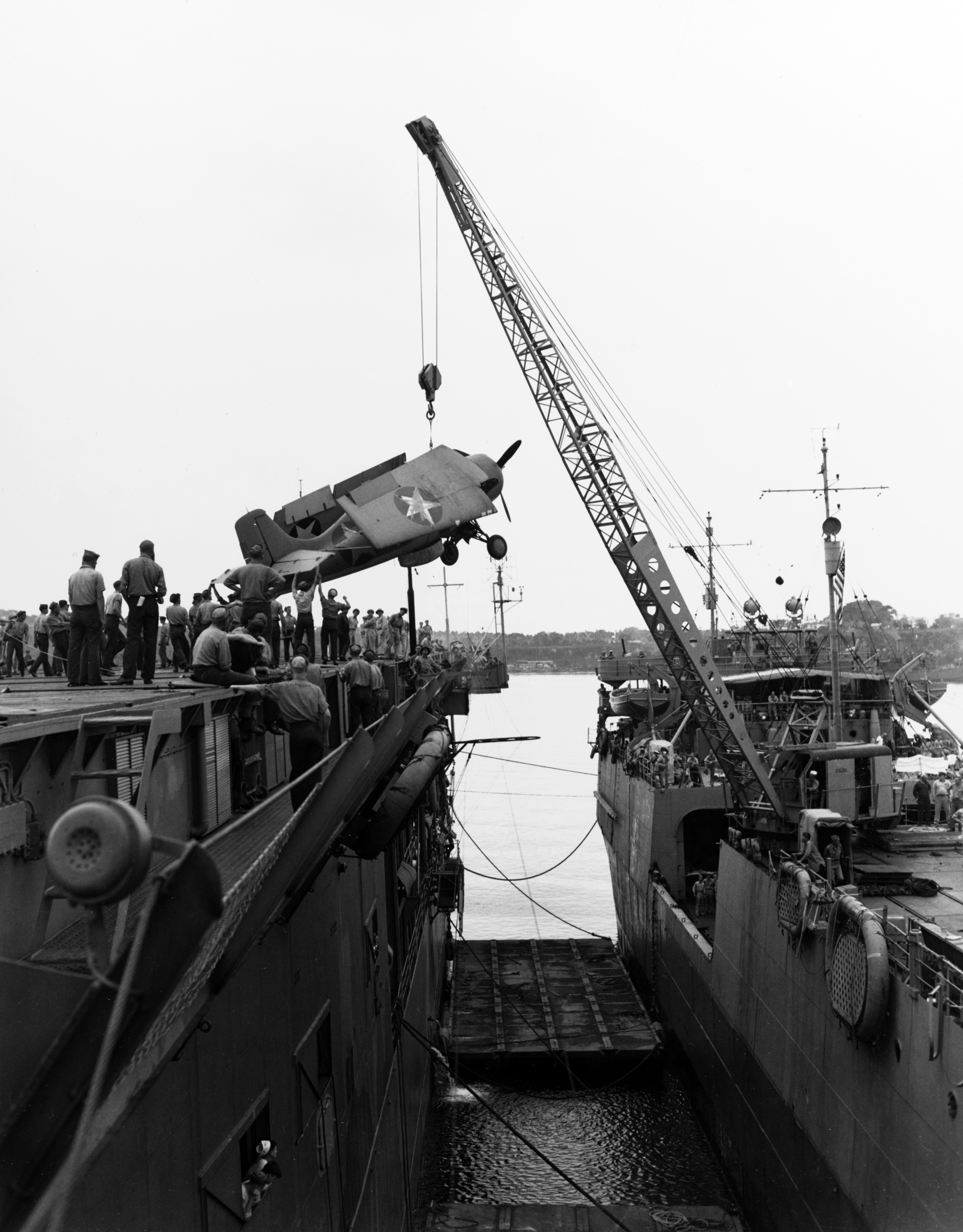
USS Kitty Hawk (AKV-1) offloading a Grumman F4F-4 Wildcat fighter to USS Long Island (CVE-1) in August 1942.

Escorted by destroyers Gwin and Sicard, Kitty Hawk departed Midway on 29 May and arrived Honolulu on 1 June. On 5 June, she learned of the American victory in the Battle of Midway, which turned back a Japanese offensive with disastrous results to the Japanese carrier attack force. That same day, she sailed for the West Coast, arriving San Diego on 13 June.

Kitty Hawk returned to Pearl Harbor on 31 July; loaded men, equipment and aircraft of the 2nd Echelon of the 23rd Marine Air Group; and set course for Port Vila, Efate, New Hebrides, arriving on 28 August. She moored alongside the escort carrier Long Island transferring 40 aircraft which were immediately catapulted by Long Island and flown directly into combat on bitterly contested Guadalcanal.

She sailed on 4 October for San Francisco, discharged and loaded cargo, then headed for Pearl Harbor, arriving on 20 October. Loading badly needed aircraft for the United States Army, she steamed to Palmyra Atoll, arriving on 30 October. There, under hazardous conditions, she embarked more aircraft, cargo and passengers. Sailing on 2 November, she arrived Dumbea Bay, Nouméa on 10 November, where she picked up men from the air group of the fleet carrier Hornet after their carrier had been sunk at the battle of the Santa Cruz Islands. Arriving at Espiritu Santo, New Hebrides on 13 November, she discharged army aviators and aircraft. Kitty Hawk sailed from Espiritu Santo on 22 November for home with 359 passengers, arriving San Diego on 7 December.

=== 1943–1944 ===
Carrying men and equipment of Marine Air Group 12, she got underway on 4 January 1943, for the New Hebrides, arriving at Espiritu Santo on 22 January; but, as enemy air raids prevented unloading, she sailed on to Pallikulo Bay, a safer place; then departed for Undine Bay, Efate, where she finished unloading men, munitions and aircraft of Marine Air Group 12. Kitty Hawk returned to San Diego on 20 February.

From 20 February 1943 – 25 June 1944, Kitty Hawk made seven voyages to Hawaii and seven to the Southwest Pacific carrying vital aircraft, fighting men and munitions to be used in pressing forward toward Japan. The ship was reclassified AKV-1 on 15 September 1943. She returned to the West Coast and arrived at San Francisco for overhaul on 5 August 1944.

Kitty Hawk loaded passengers, aircraft, and cargo at San Diego and sailed 29 August for Finschhafen, New Guinea; Seeadler Harbor, Manus, Admiralty Islands; Guadalcanal; and Espiritu Santo, returning San Diego on 12 October 1944.

Kitty Hawk sailed directly from San Francisco to Manus, arriving on 12 November. From Manus, she steamed to the Solomon Islands to pick up men of a radio control drone unit: called at Guadalcanal on 26 November, Espiritu Santo on 30 November: then sailed for Pearl Harbor, arriving on 9 December. Two days later, she sailed to Maui Island, where she debarked the radar control unit.

=== 1945–1946 ===
After minor repairs at San Diego, Kitty Hawk sailed on 7 January 1945, to various ports in the South Pacific; returned to San Francisco on 17 February; made a quick turn about; and steamed back to the forward area, returning to the West Coast on 12 June.

Kitty Hawk received news of the end of hostilities on 13 August 1945, while at Pearl Harbor. Basing from Pearl Harbor, she carried military cargo to the Marshall Islands, the Mariana Islands, and the Philippines. She departed Pearl Harbor on 24 November for the East Coast. Kitty Hawk arrived Bayonne, New Jersey on 15 December; visited Norfolk, Virginia: decommissioned at New York on 24 January 1946; and was returned to her owner, Seatrain Lines, Inc., the same day.

== Post war ==
USS Kitty Hawk was leased to United Fruit Company on the day of decommissioning and returned to her original owners in May 1946. Reverted to her old name SS Seatrain New York in Chester, PA, she remained a cargo ship until being sold to Hua Eng Copper and Iron Industrial Company Limited of Taiwan for scrapping in March 1973.

== Bibliography ==
- Borton, Donald E. (1991). "Question 23/90". Warship International. XXVIII (3): 306–310. ISSN 0043-0374.
