= Howard Pack =

Howard M. Pack
- Born: September 21, 1918; Manhattan
- Died: December 9, 2008 (aged 90)
- Education: Columbia University
- Occupation: shipping executive
- Known for: Seatrain Lines

Howard Meade Pack (September 21, 1918 – December 9, 2008) was a shipping industry executive who served as the chairman and president of Seatrain Lines, an innovator in the way ships carried freight.

== Life ==
Pack was born in Manhattan on September 21, 1918. He attended Columbia University, graduating in 1939 with a degree in economics. Pack went into business with his father, who was a furrier. Pack served in the United States Coast Guard during World War II. After his military service, he came back to the family business where he met Joseph Kahn, who also worked in the fur business.

Pack and Kahn formed Transeastern Associates in the early 1950s with the purchase of a Liberty ship. By 1965, Transeastern controlled 36 ships, most sailing under the United States flag, including the SS Manhattan, a 108,400-ton tanker that was then the largest craft under the US flag. Transeastern used the Manhattan as a bulk carrier, loading it with such cargoes as 101,000 tons of wheat sent to Pakistan.

Through Transeastern Associates, Pack and Kahn bought Seatrain Lines in 1965 for $8.5 million. The firm, which had been established in 1931, had six ships in its fleet that it used to carry loaded railroad boxcars between ports, rather than the then-industry standard of loading cargo into the hold of ships using nets, cranes and many longshoremen. At the time of their purchase, Seatrain operated between New York and ports in Savannah, Georgia, Texas City, Texas, New Orleans and Puerto Rico. Transeastern was folded into Seatrain in September 1966; At the time Seatrain had lost more than $500,000 in a four-month period before the merger, while Transeastern's fleet had netted nearly $7 million in a ten-month period. Under their management, Seatrain purchased ships that could carry shipping containers, which could be transferred between ships and trucks or trains, making them one of the earliest in the industry to make this conversion. Pack and Kahn expanded the business into shipbuilding, using facilities at the Brooklyn Navy Yard. Additionally, the firm established a large international container shipping division headquartered in Weehawken, New Jersey. By the 1970s, the firm had 4,000 employees and was earning $250 million annually, but was hurt by the 1973 oil crisis, dockworker strikes and overbuilding in the shipping industry. By 1981, the firm was shut down.

A resident of Scarsdale, New York, Pack died at age 90 on December 9, 2008, due to heart failure.
