= Mount Aopinie =

Mountain in New Caledonia

Coordinates: 21°10′44″S 165°16′0″E

Mount Aopinie (French: Mont Aoupinié) is a mountain of central New Caledonia, with an elevation of 1,000 metres (3,300 ft).

The source of the Poya River lies to the southwest. The landscape is dominated by dense forest.

The eponymous faunal reserve (Réserve de Faune de l’Aoupinié) contains the mountain and its surrounds, straddling the border between Poya and Ponérihouen communes.

Biological names that reference the location include: the spiders Bradystichus aoupinie^{(Wikispecies)} and Orstom aoupinie^{(Wikispecies)}; and the moth genus Aoupinieta. Type specimens for the lizard Nannoscincus rankini and the flatworm Pimea monticola were collected at the mountain's summit.

Nearby towns include Gohapin.
