= Gadji Bay =

Coordinates: 22°10′38″S 166°23′12″E

Gadji Bay or Baie Gadji is a bay in southwestern New Caledonia. It lies to the north of Noumea and just north of the Dumbéa Bay. Settlements on this stretch of coast include Savanah and Nakutakoin. It contains an island known as "Pine Island" because of its prominent pine trees and a shipwreck.

This bay has major historical importance for its naval history, during World War II was used for Naval Base Noumea.
