= Dumbéa Bay =

Coordinates: 22°13′21″S 166°22′37″E

Dumbéa Bay or Baie de la Dumbéa is a bay on the southwestern coast of Grande Terre in New Caledonia. It lies to the northwest of Nouméa. To the north is Gadji Bay. This bay has major historical importance related to the naval history of New Caledonia and the Pacific Ocean, especially during World War II, when it was the site of the United States Navy's Naval Base Noumea. Numerous ships anchored in the bay during the war, including the light cruiser USS Atlanta (CL-51), the destroyer USS Anderson (DD-411), the destroyer minesweeper USS Southard (DMS-10), the aircraft transport USS Kitty Hawk (AKV-1), the fleet replenishment oiler USS Cimarron (AO-22), and the cargo ship USS Aludra (AK-72).
