= Undine Bay =

Bay in Vanuatu

Coordinates: 17°30′54″S 168°21′27″E

Undine Bay is a bay on the northern coast of Efate, Vanuatu. It lies between the main island and the smaller islands of Nguna Island and Pele Island, and east of Moso. The coastal area has been subject to the Marina Estates waterways residential development in recent years.
