= Gohapin, New Caledonia =

Gohapin is a hamlet in the Poya Commune, located at the foot of Mont Aoupinié, inside Province Nord. Its postal code is 98827.

== Population ==
About 800 people live here the last time they counted, making it the 2nd largest tribal community.

== Attractions ==
There are many hiking trails near Gohapin, and a lot of wildlife.
