= Nekoro Bay =

Bay in New Caledonia, France

Coordinates: 21°20′39″S 164°59′20″E

Nekoro Bay or Baie Nekoro is a bay in southwestern New Caledonia. It lies just northwest of Porwi Bay. The town of Nepoui and Nepoui Airport lie on the coast at Nekoro Bay. The bay contains Grimault Island and Hiyé Hiyé Island. Blancbe Bay lies just to the northwest.
