= Joseph Kahn (shipping executive) =

American shipping industry executive

Joseph Kahn (May 25, 1916 – December 3, 1979), was a shipping industry executive who served as the chairman of Seatrain Lines, an innovator in the way ships carried freight. Kahn immigrated to the United States in 1930 from the Soviet Union. Kahn enlisted in the United States Army at the beginning of World War II, ascending through the ranks from private to first lieutenant.

== Family business ==
He had worked for Kahn Brother and Pinto, the family fur business, which he left in 1950 to start Transeastern Associates, which started with the purchase of a surplus World War II-era Liberty ship and had expanded into ownership of 36 bulk cargo carriers. Transeastern was created together with Howard Pack, another furrier who was also looking to get out of the family fur business and start something new.

== Shipping ==
Both Kahn and Pack had been in the fur trade before turning to shipping, though they had not been associated in the fur business. Asked about the fur connection after their 1965 purchase of Seatrain, Kahn answered that "there may be a moral in this, but I don't know what it is".

In an April 1967 speech to the United States Merchant Marine Academy alumni association, Kahn advocated for rules to benefit the domestic shipping industry, including retention of cabotage laws that require domestic shipping be by ships owned and built in the United States and crewed by Americans. He also pushed for a requirement that all foreign aid shipments be on American ships. that the United States Navy's Military Sea Transportation Service use American-flagged vessels exclusively and that at least half of oil imported into the United States be on American-flagged ships.

== Shipbuilding ==
By the time of Kahn's death, Seatrain had expanded into shipbuilding, and had 3,000 employees and annual revenues of $250 million. Kahn served on the American Bureau of Shipping's board of managers and was president of the American Maritime Association.

Kahn was a longtime critic of what he felt was a failure of the United States government to create a competitive merchant fleet sailing under the US flag. Kahn stated that the United States Navy was mistaken in counting on the loyalty of foreign-owned ships to be available in case of an emergency. Kahn stated that the "United States is too big, too strong, too powerful not to have its own capability in the construction and manning of ships".

A resident of Manhattan, Kahn died at University Hospital at age 63 on December 3, 1979, after a brief illness.
