= Karen Ohland =

American biomechanical engineer and museum administrator

Karen J. Ohland is an American biomechanical engineer and museum administrator, and the former president of the American Society of Mechanical Engineers (ASME).

== Education and career ==
Ohland graduated from Swarthmore College with a double major in engineering and biology. Continuing her studies, she earned a master's degree in anatomy from the University of Chicago.

As a biomechanical engineer, she researched the mechanical properties and injuries to ligaments at the University of Pittsburgh's Orthopaedic Biomechanics Lab and Musculoskeletal Research Center from 1986 to 1993. She also worked on orthopedic implants for Howmedica Inc. and Howmedica Osteonics, until its acquisition in 1998.

Shifting to a career in museum administration, she worked as a finance administrator at the Metropolitan Museum of Art in New York for almost 13 years before, in 2012, moving to the Princeton University Art Museum as associate director for finances and operations. She continues to work for the museum as a senior associate director.

== American Society of Mechanical Engineers ==
Ohland joined the ASME in 1983, and was named as an ASME Fellow in 2021. She became president of the ASME for the 2022–2023 term.
