= Gomen Bay =

Bay in northwestern New Caledonia

Coordinates: 20°43′57″S 164°23′55″E

Gomen Bay or Baie Gomen is a bay in northwestern New Caledonia. It lies northwest of Chasseloup Bay and southeast of Ohland Bay. The village of Kaala Gomen lies near the bay.
