= Kakula (island) =

Island in Vanuatu

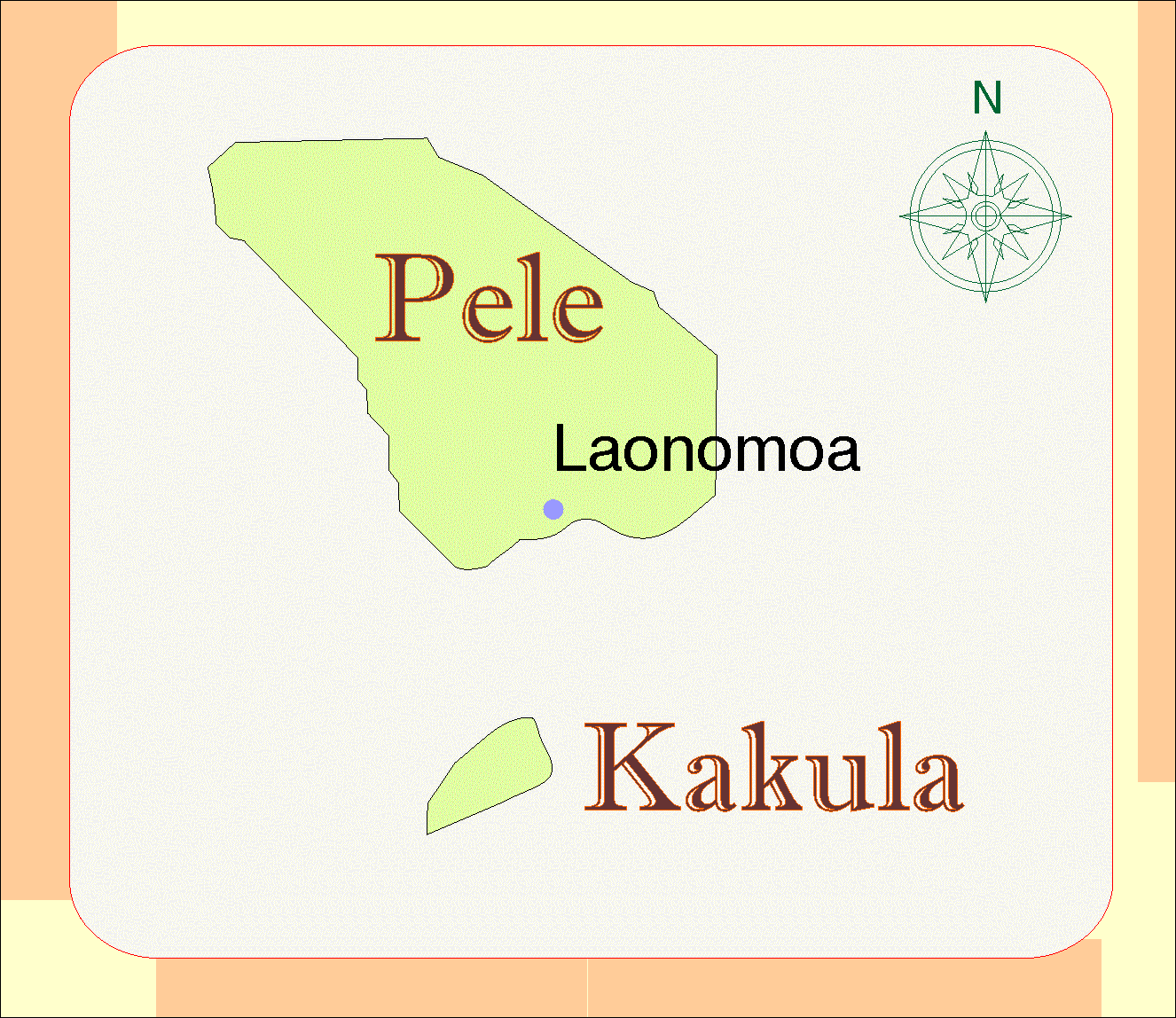

Geography
- Location: Pacific Ocean
- Coordinates: 17°31′S 168°24′E
- Archipelago: Vanuatu

Administration
- Vanuatu
- Province: Shefa Province

Demographics
- Population: 0 (2015)
- Ethnic groups: None

Kakula is a small uninhabited islet in Shefa Province of Vanuatu in the Pacific Ocean. The island is a tourist destination.

== Geography ==
Kakula lies between the north-east shore of Efate and Pele.
