= Poya Bay =

Bay of New Caledonia

Coordinates: 21°25′S 165°05′E

Poya Bay or Baie de la Poya, also known as Porwi Bay, is a bay of New Caledonia.

It lies about 2 miles west-northwestward of Cape Goulvain, 2 miles in length, and is entered by Poya Passage, a narrow channel between the reefs, about 800 yards wide." The mouth of the Poya River is located on the bay.

== See also ==
- List of rivers of New Caledonia
