= Ohland Bay =

Bay in northwestern New Caledonia

Coordinates: 20°28′35″S 164°10′16″E

Ohland Bay or Baie Ohland Bay is a bay in northwestern New Caledonia. It lies northwest of Gomen Bay and just southeast of Nehoue Bay. The village of Paagoumene lies on the bay.
