= Pele (island) =

Island in Shefa, Vanuatu

Coordinates: 17°29′35″S 168°24′25″E

Pélé
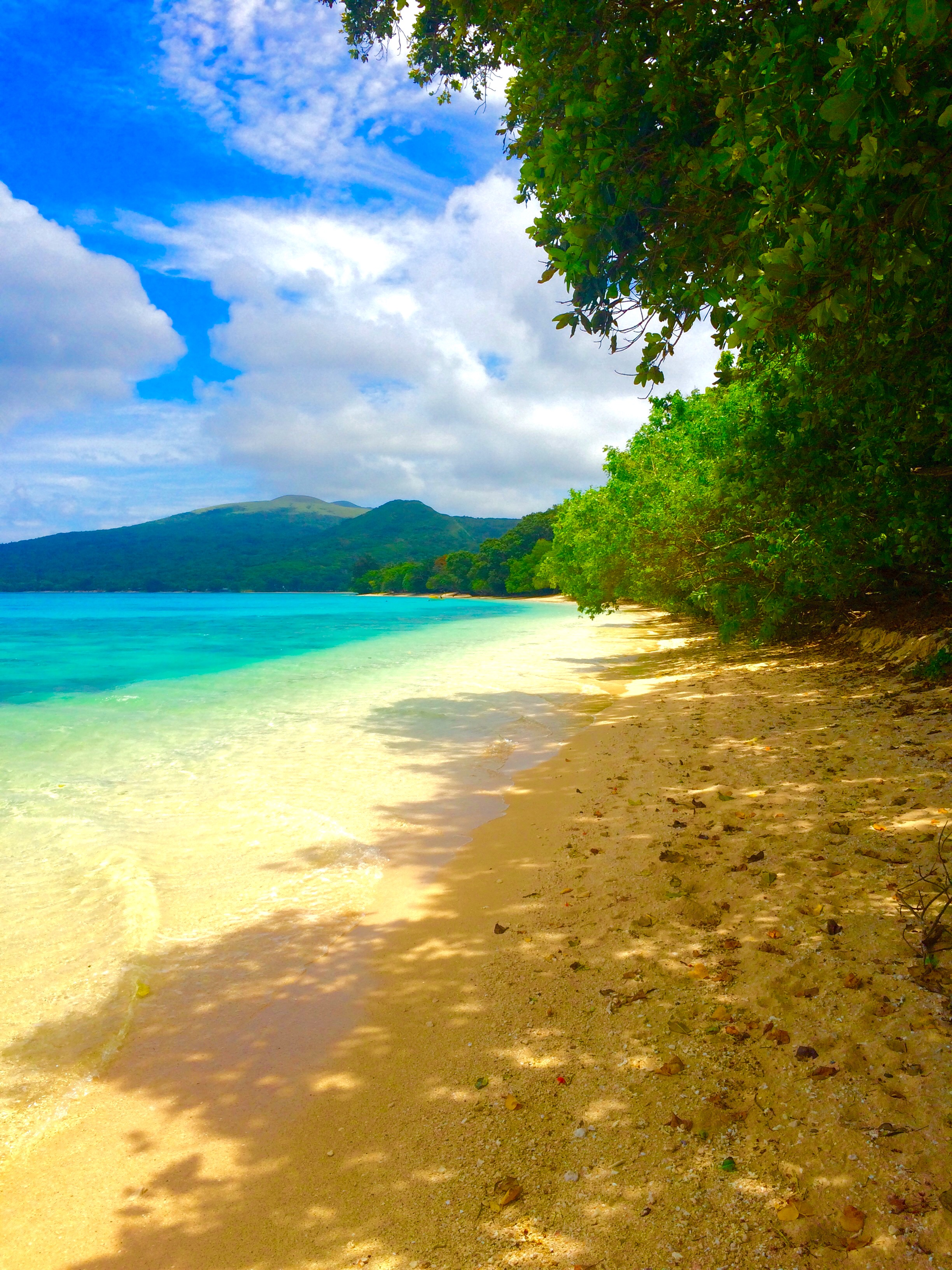
- Beach by Worearu Village with Nguna Island in the background.
- Interactive map of Pélé

Geography
- Location: Pacific Ocean
- Archipelago: Vanuatu
- Area: 4.3 km^{2} (1.7 sq mi)
- Highest elevation: 198 m (650 ft)

Administration
- Vanuatu
- Province: Shefa Province

Demographics
- Population: 220 (2015)
- Ethnic groups: Ni-Vanuatu

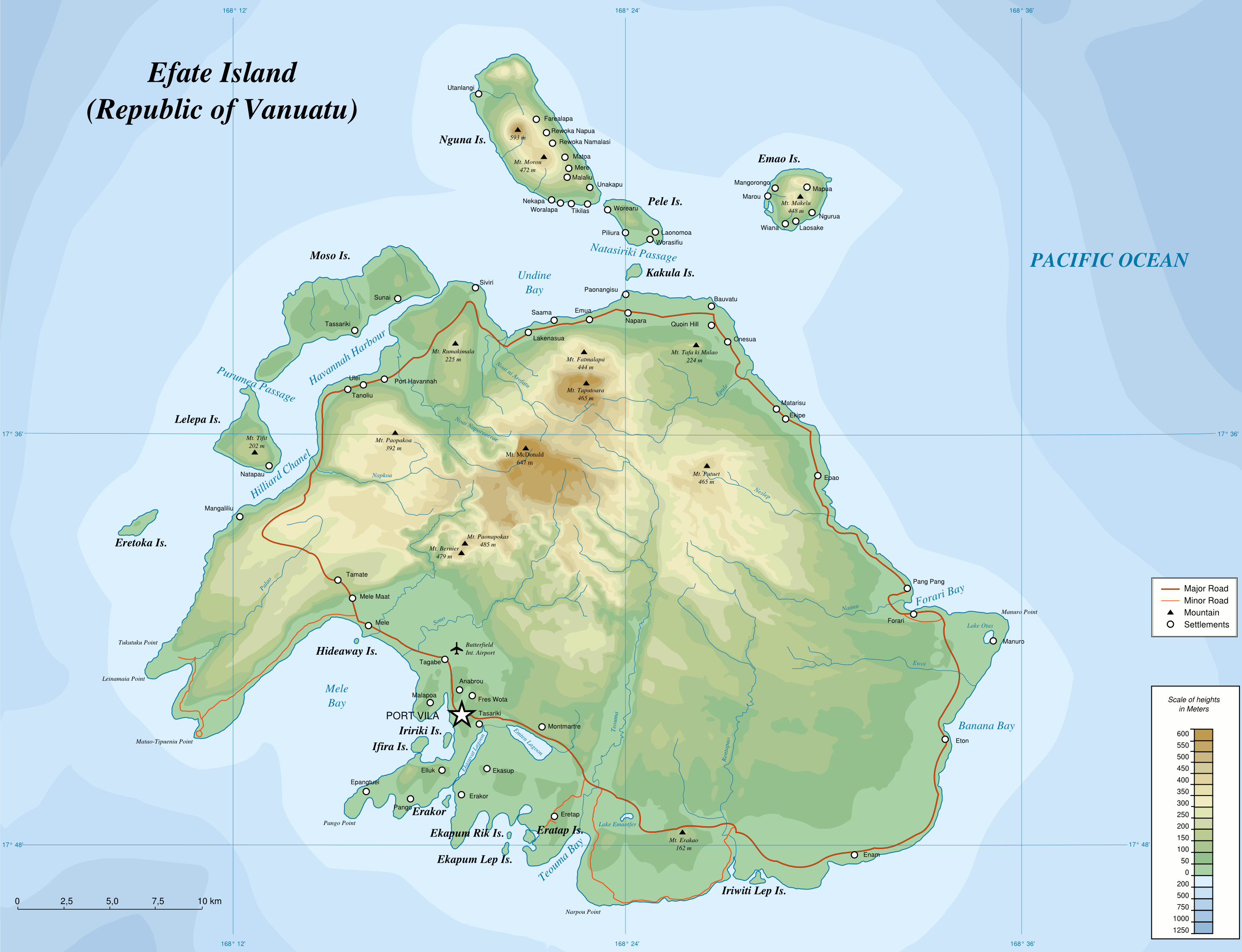
Map of Éfaté, Pélé, Nguna, Kakula, and other islands in the region.

Pélé, sometimes spelled Pele in English, is a volcanic island located 11,2 miles north of the island of Éfaté in the Shefa Province of the Republic of Vanuatu. It has a total area of 1.7 square miles, Pélé is inhabited by about 200-220 Ni-Vanuatu villagers residing in the four villages: Worsiviu, Worearu, Piliura, and Launamoa.

== Geography ==
Much of the island is extremely steep and rocks prevent you from walking along the coastline around the island. White sandy beaches are found in Piliura, Worearu, Laonamoa, and Sake.

Overpopulation has led to a steady migration from Pele villages to southern Nguna in recent times.

== The Nguna-Pele Marine Protected Area ==
Pélé Island is a part of the MPA Nguna-Pele Marine Protected Area, which was established in 2003, and is a popular Vanuatuan diving location.

The Nguna-Pele Marine Protected Area covers a total area of 11.5 sq. mi., including numerous reefs, sea grass beds, mangrove forests and intertidal lagoons. The Nguna-Pele Marine Protection Agency is located in the village of Piliura, and mounts an exhibition and sells T-shirts.

== Tourism ==
Income from tourism is distributed by the Village Tourism Committee and supports aims as village water supply projects. The island can be visited daily by boat from the Paonangisu area by the town of Emua on Éfaté's north coast. There are also yachts available both from Emua and Nguna for day and overnight charters to the island. The island is nearly adjacent to the island of Nguna, with a small passage no deeper than 33 yards separating the two. It has a tropical climate and has a maximum elevation of 650 feet at its highest.
