= USS Sabine (AO-25) =

Oiler of the United States Navy

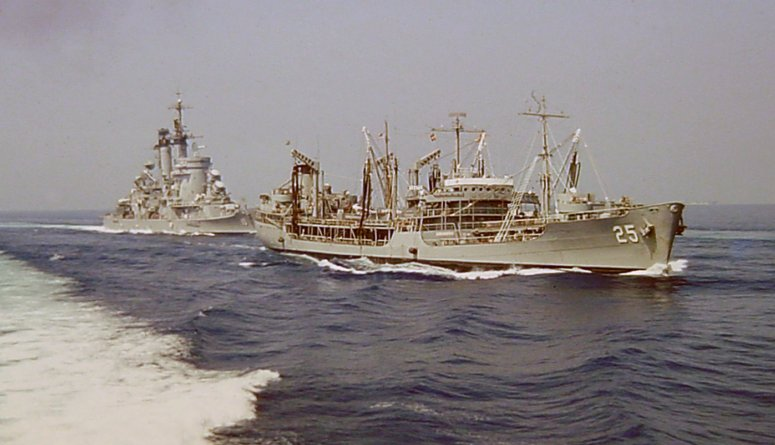
- Sabine (foreground) and the guided missile cruiser Albany in the Caribbean Sea in March 1967

History

United States
- Name: USS Sabine
- Namesake: Sabine River
- Builder: Bethlehem Shipbuilding Corporation, Sparrows Point, Maryland
- Laid down: 18 September 1939
- Launched: 27 April 1940 as SS Esso Albany
- Sponsored by: Miss Ellen Klitgaard
- Acquired: Purchased, 25 September 1940
- Commissioned: 5 December 1940
- Decommissioned: 14 February 1955
- Recommissioned: 10 December 1956, by MSTS
- Decommissioned: 13 November 1957
- Stricken: 14 January 1959
- Recommissioned: 14 December 1961
- Decommissioned: 20 February 1969
- Stricken: 1 December 1976
- Fate: Sold, 1 August 1983

General characteristics
- Class & type: Cimarron-class oiler
- Displacement: 7,470 long tons (7,590 t) light; 24,830 long tons (25,228 t) full load
- Length: 553 ft (169 m)
- Beam: 75 ft (23 m)
- Draft: 32 ft 4 in (9.86 m)
- Propulsion: Twin screws, 30,400 shp (22,669 kW); Steam (600psi), NSFO
- Speed: 18 knots (33 km/h; 21 mph)
- Complement: 304
- Armament: 4 × 5 in (130 mm)/38 cal. guns (4×1); 4 × 40 mm AA guns; 4 × 20 mm AA guns

Service record
- Part of: US Pacific Fleet (1941-49); US Atlantic Fleet (1949-55, 1961-69); Military Sea Transportation Service (1956-57); National Defense Reserve Fleet (1957-61, 1970-76); Atlantic Reserve Fleet (1969-70)
- Operations: World War II
- Awards: 10 battle stars

USS Sabine (AO-25), a Cimarron-class fleet replenishment oiler serving in the United States Navy, was the second ship named for the Sabine River on the Texas-Louisiana border.

Sabine was laid down on 18 September 1939 as SS Esso Albany, MC hull 10, by the Bethlehem Shipbuilding Corporation, at the Bethlehem Sparrows Point Shipyard, Sparrows Point, Maryland; launched on 27 April 1940; sponsored by Miss Ellen Klitgaard; renamed Sabine on 19 September 1940; acquired by the Navy through purchase on 25 September 1940; and commissioned on 5 December 1940.

== World War II ==
Following shakedown, Sabine transited the Panama Canal and joined the Base Force Squadron of the US Pacific Fleet. During 1941, she plied the waters between California and Pearl Harbor, Hawaii, supplying fuel to ships operating in Hawaiian waters.

Early in 1942, Sabine supported carrier task forces that carried out raids against Wake Island and the Gilbert Islands. On 10 April, she joined the task force built around the aircraft carriers USS Hornet and USS Enterprise which steamed to within 700 miles (1,100 km) of the coast of Japan and launched bomber aircraft of the United States Army Air Forces commanded by Lt. Col. James Doolittle. The Doolittle Raiders bombed Tokyo, Yokosuka, Nagoya, and Kobe. This strike surprised the Japanese and helped to boost American morale.

In May, Sabine provided at-sea refueling for ships in the South Pacific near New Guinea and Australia. In June, she serviced destroyers and cruisers on Aleutian Patrol off Kodiak, Alaska. August found her in southern waters again where, in company with the aircraft carrier USS Saratoga, she played an important role in the Battle of the Eastern Solomons. During September, she supported ships in and around New Caledonia, the Solomon Islands, and the New Hebrides. By October, she was busy providing fuel for warships engaging Japanese forces in the Battle of the Santa Cruz Islands.

Sabine returned to the United States for two brief periods in January and July 1943. The rest of her time, up to November, was spent on fueling operations in the South and Central Pacific. When the assault on the Gilbert Islands commenced on 19 November 1943, Sabine was busy refueling the carriers, battleships, cruisers, and destroyers that were supporting the landing forces. During the Gilbert operation, the "sea going service station" concept emerged. Sabine and other oilers were assigned designated station areas. Individual combatant ships were sent to these areas in accordance with a preplanned schedule, rather than steam in groups to the areas where each might lose hours waiting for her turn alongside the oiler. Other oilers shuttled between the station areas and Pearl Harbor, which was replenished by a vast fleet of Merchant Marine tankers.

In January, February, and March 1944, Sabine operated with Task Force 58 supporting carrier raids on the Palau Islands, the Caroline Islands, and the Marshall Islands. She was detached on 22 April; but, after a voyage to Pearl Harbor, arrived at Majuro Atoll on 18 May ready to rejoin TF 58 for the coming Marianas Islands campaign. The force sortied on 6 June, and Sabine supported the landings on Saipan and Guam and subsequent operations in the Marianas until returning to Pearl Harbor on 14 August. She participated in the invasion of the Palaus during September. In October, she supported the assault forces at Leyte and subsequently provided fuel during follow-up operations in the Philippines. From March through June 1945, Sabine assisted in the Okinawan campaign. July and August were spent supporting US Third Fleet strikes against the Japanese home islands. Japan surrendered in mid-August, and Sabine anchored in Tokyo Bay on 18 September.

== Postwar service ==
Sabine's postwar duties took her from Tokyo to the Yangtze River. Arriving on 19 November, she remained until 22 April 1946. From China, she returned to Hawaiian and West Coast operations. However, she made several Far East cruises; and, on 13 June 1949, she was transferred to the US Atlantic Fleet.

Sabine followed a schedule of East Coast fueling operations, training exercises, and Mediterranean deployments until she was placed out of commission, in reserve, on 14 February 1955 and assigned to the Pacific Reserve Fleet for further transfer to the Military Sea Transportation Service (MSTS).

She was activated by MSTS on 15 November 1956 at San Diego and commissioned on 10 December.

Following operations under MSTS, Sabine was again placed out of commission, in reserve, on 13 November 1957. Berthed with the National Defense Reserve Fleet at Beaumont, Texas, she was not struck from the Navy List until 14 January 1959.

Sabine was reacquired by the Navy in 1961 and towed to New York City for refitting. She recommissioned on 14 December 1961 and rejoined the Atlantic Fleet, homeported at Mayport, Florida.

During the Cuban Missile Crisis, Sabine was active in the naval quarantine late in 1962. She also participated in operations during the political crisis of mid-1965 in the Dominican Republic. The remainder of the time, during these years and the years which followed, found Sabine busy in local operations, training exercises, and deployments to the North Atlantic Ocean and the Mediterranean. In October 1968, she was ordered to report to Philadelphia to begin deactivation. For a third time in her long career, Sabine was decommissioned on 20 February 1969; and she joined the Atlantic Reserve Fleet, at Philadelphia, Pennsylvania. On 22 January 1970, Sabine was transferred to the custody of the Maritime Administration and berthed with the James River, Virginia, Group of the National Defense Reserve Fleet, where she remained into 1976. She was struck from the Navy List for the final time on 1 December 1976, and sold on 1 August 1983.

== Awards ==
- Presidential Unit Citation
- Navy Meritorious Unit Commendation
- Navy Expeditionary Medal
- China Service Medal
- American Defense Service Medal with fleet clasp
- American Campaign Medal
- Asiatic-Pacific Campaign Medal with 10 battle stars
- World War II Victory Medal
- Navy Occupation Service Medal (with "ASIA" and "EUROPE" clasps)
- National Defense Service Medal
- Armed Forces Expeditionary Medal (two awards)
- Philippine Liberation Medal (Philippines)
