= XXXVIII Corps =

XXXVIII Corps or 38th Corps may refer to:

== Germany ==
- XXXVIII Reserve Corps, German Empire
- XXXVIII Army Corps (Wehrmacht)

== Russia and Soviet Union ==
- 38th Army Corps (Russian Empire)
- 38th Guards Airborne Corps, Soviet Union

== Ukraine ==
- 38th Army Corps (Ukraine)

== United Kingdom ==
- 38th (Rifle Rangers) Lanarkshire Rifle Volunteer Corps
- 38th (Liverpool) Lancashire Rifle Volunteer Corps
- 38th (United Artists Rifles) Middlesex Rifle Volunteer Corps

== See also ==
- List of military corps by number
- 38th Army (disambiguation)
- 38th Brigade (disambiguation)
- 38th Division (disambiguation)
- 38th Regiment (disambiguation)
- 38th Squadron (disambiguation)
- 38th (disambiguation)
