= 38th Cavalry =

38th Cavalry may refer to:

- 38th Cavalry Regiment (United States)
- 38th Mississippi Infantry Regiment, sometimes (inaccurately) referred to as the 38th Mississippi Cavalry Regiment
- 38th Regiment Central India Horse, British India
- 38th (High Wycombe) Company, Imperial Yeomanry

== See also ==
- 38th Division (disambiguation)
- 38th Brigade (disambiguation)
- 38th Regiment (disambiguation)
- 38th (disambiguation)
