= 38th =

38th is the ordinal form of the number 38. 38th or Thirty-eighth may also refer to:

- A fraction, 1/38, equal to one of 38 equal parts

== Geography ==
- 38th meridian east, a line of longitude
- 38th meridian west, a line of longitude
- 38th parallel north, a circle of latitude
- 38th parallel south, a circle of latitude
- 38th Street (disambiguation)

== Military ==
- 38th Army (disambiguation)
- 38th Brigade (disambiguation)
- 38th Division (disambiguation)
- 38th Regiment (disambiguation)
- 38th Squadron (disambiguation)

== Other ==
- 38th century
- 38th century BC

== See also ==
- 38 (disambiguation)
