= 38th Army =

Thirty-Eighth Army or 38th Army may refer to:

- 38th Army (People's Republic of China)
- Thirty-Eighth Army (Japan), Imperial Japanese Army
- 38th Army (Soviet Union)

== See also ==
- List of armies by number
- 38th Division (disambiguation)
- 38th Brigade (disambiguation)
- 38th Regiment (disambiguation)
- 38th Squadron (disambiguation)
- 38th (disambiguation)
