= Jon Caramanica =

American journalist and music critic (born 1975)

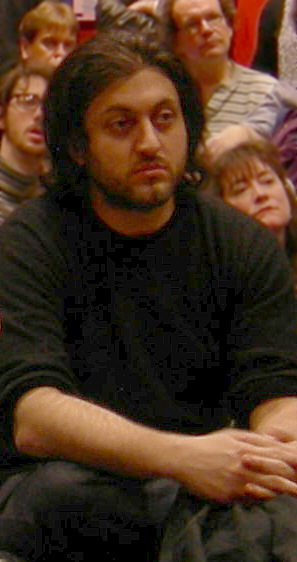
- Caramanica in 2007
- Born: October 12, 1975 (age 51); Brooklyn, New York City, U.S.
- Education: Harvard University (B.A.)
- Occupation: Journalist · Podcast host
- Years active: 1997-present
- Notable work: The New York Times, XXL, Spin, Vibe, The Village Voice

Jon Caramanica (born October 12, 1975) is an American journalist, music critic and podcast host. He is a writer at The New York Times and co-host of Popcast, the newspaper's music podcast.

== Early life and education ==
Caramanica was born in Brooklyn, New York City in 1975. He is of Italian descent. Caramanica graduated from Stuyvesant High School in Manhattan in 1993. He earned a Bachelor of Arts in English from Harvard University in 1997.

== Career ==
Caramanica began his journalism career after graduating from Harvard in 1997, writing for publications including Rolling Stone, Spin and The Village Voice. He developed a particular focus on hip-hop, establishing himself as a specialist in rap and contemporary music criticism.

He later became a senior contributing writer at XXL, before joining Vibe as music editor in 2006. He remained in that role until 2008, overseeing the magazine's music coverage during a period of significant change in hip-hop and R&B.

After working freelance, including for The New York Times, Caramanica joined the newspaper permanently in 2010 as a pop music critic. His coverage has since expanded across hip-hop, pop, R&B and rock, as well as television, fashion and wider popular culture.

Caramanica began hosting Popcast, The New York Times's music podcast, in 2014. Alongside co-host Joe Coscarelli, the pair discuss contemporary music and culture, and intreview artists such as Lil Wayne, Olivia Rodrigo, Bad Bunny, Rosalía, A$AP Rocky, Luke Combs and Addison Rae. In 2024, Popcast won Best Music Podcast at the iHeartRadio Podcast Awards and won Gold at the Signal Award.

== Awards ==
Year	Award	Awarding body	Result
2024	Best Music	iHeartPodcast Awards	Won
2024	Best Music	Signal Awards	Won
