= No Big Deal (TV series) =

AI comedy show

- Genre: Artificial intelligence; Comedy; Investment
- Created by: Andrew Dickinson
- Written by: Andrew Dickinson
- Directed by: Andrew Dickinson
- Country of origin: United Kingdom
- Original language: English
- No. of series: 1
- No. of episodes: 1

Production
- Producers: Andrew Dickinson; ModeLabs
- Cinematography: ModeLabs
- Editor: ModeLabs
- Running time: 25 minutes

Original release
- Network: YouTube
- Release: 11 September 2026

No Big Deal is an online comedy show, generated by artificial intelligence in 2026. It was written by Andrew Dickinson and produced by ModeLabs.ai. The show was released on YouTube.

== Premise ==
The show follows Janus, an investment capital team founded by John Stevens, who had founded the firm using an inheritance, and led by Lydia de Mabro, who had secured the firm's only investment. The main character is investor Derek Tudor, who works alongside Perry Kent, an American banker who joined to secure a green card. In the first episode, Tudor confronts the Minister for Transport after his commute, reviews a diagnostic smart toilet with his team, and prepare to pitch an idea for velour furniture optimised for sex.

== Production ==
The show was created using artificial intelligence by former angel investor and investment banker Andrew Dickinson, who had found producing the series through general television production prohibitively expensive. He made the show with British AI firm ModeLabs.ai, with Andy Pike performing the music. The former's Dan Hawthorne compared the show's use of AI to the use of computer-generated imagery in Marvel Cinematic Universe films. No Big Deal was produced for and released to YouTube and billed itself as "The Office meets Dragons' Den".

== Reception ==
No Big Deal received overwhelmingly negative reviews. The Guardian gave the first episode zero stars out of a possible five and described the show as having all the expected faults associated with artificially generated content. Stuart Heritage referred to the acting as "flat", criticised the dialogue as not matching the lip movement, and compared the AI cast to wax figures. Chortle awarded one star out of five and criticised the reliance on innuendo.
