= 38 Special =

38 Special or 0.38 Special or .38 Special, may refer to:

- .38 Special, a revolver cartridge

== Music ==
- 38 Special (band), an American rock band
  - 38 Special (album), the 1977 debut album of the band 38 Special
- .38 Special (song), a 2022 song by American rapper the Game on the album Drillmatic – Heart vs. Mind
- .38 Special (guitar), a Fender replica guitar by Tōkai Gakki

== Other uses ==
- ".38 Special" (episode), a 1993 TV episode, the season 4 number 9 episode 73 of Blossom; see List of Blossom episodes
- Train 38 Special, a train service at Padang Besar railway station

== See also ==
- "Special 38" (episode), an episode of the Japanese animated TV show Crayon Shin-chan
- Special (disambiguation)
- 38 (disambiguation)
