= The HAB Theory =

1976 science fiction novel by Allan W. Eckert

- First edition
- Author: Allan W. Eckert
- Language: English
- Genre: Science fiction; Apocalyptic and post-apocalyptic fiction
- Published: 1976 (Little, Brown and Company)
- Publication place: United States
- Media type: Print (hardcover)
- Pages: 566 pp (first edition)
- ISBN: 978-0-445-08597-8
- OCLC: 4452943

The HAB Theory is a 1976 science fiction novel by American author Allan W. Eckert. The novel is from the apocalyptic fiction subgenre. Eckert believed that the real-world facts and conclusions he quoted in the novel, were worthy of further exploration. One such conclusion was that hyper-specialization in the physical sciences was a big problem and that more interactions between hyper-specialists was overdue. He wove facts and concepts into the novel form, then his 17th book, to get more minds considering them. The book explores a version of pole shift hypothesis postulated by Professor Charles Hapgood in two volumes, plus the 1967 book Cataclysms of the Earth by Hugh Auchincloss Brown.

When Brown published "Cataclysms", he was in his 90s, so he is represented in the novel by the character Herbert Allan Boardman (The "HAB" of the title) also in his 90s.

== Background ==
Boardman stages a clever faux assassination attempt on the President of the United States as a ruse to draw attention to his theory. The ruse involves a wax .38 caliber bullet propelled only by the cartridge-primer at a Presidential rope-line handshake stop. HAB completes the ruse and survives his arrest long enough to wake up in a hospital and tell his story to a fictional Woodstein which sets the action in motion.

The HAB Theory was Eckert's second novel, but first major fiction publication, and had sold 150,000 copies by 1978. The book was made available via demand printing in 2004, though this version appears to contain a number of typos indicating that it was produced from something a bit earlier than the final published draft. The novel's romantic sub-plot which today seems quite archaic, was consistent with similar storytelling threads of the mid 1970s and was in fact based on the author's own divorce.

The novel borrows heavily from Brown's theory and book, which is that approximately every 6,000–7,000 years the Earth's polar ice caps become over-burdened with ice, creating such an imbalance in the planet's center of gravity, that the Earth's poles and the Earth's equator shift positions. The former poles are soon located somewhere between the Tropic of Cancer and the Tropic of Capricorn, where the weight of the polar ice cap leaves a large circular depression and other dramatic geological changes occur as the huge quantity of water is released by the ice caps melting.

Called "capsizing" in the novel the "rollover" takes place in a single day. Since the velocity of an object at the equator of the Earth is approximately 1,000 MPH (1,674 km/h), any such rapid change in rotational axis is a massive disturbance to everything from a grain of sand to a mountain or an ocean. Humans and their works in such an event would be as fallen leaves before a windstorm. The exception being two places on earth called "pivot points" which the book says can be calculated and further that prior civilizations had calculated them and placed long-term-surviving information at such points.

OOPARTs - "out of place artifacts" real-world scientific anomalies (flattened petrified forests in Nova Scotia, huge depressions in Hudson Bay and the Sahara Desert, ancient maps showing Antarctica's coastline free of ice, woolly mammoths found with un-swallowed food in their mouths) are presented as evidence of The HAB Theory's possible validity. These OOPARTS are interpreted to suggest that human civilizations have existed on earth many times, during intervals like the current 6,000 - odd years of recorded history only to disappear over and over in yet another "capsizing." Thus human civilizations rise from hunter/gatherer/shepherds to builders of cities and flying vehicles - only to see that civilization "rebooted" by the planet's repeated capsizing.

Citing OOPARTS in support of an out-of-the-mainstream theory is a technique used in other works, including for example the well-known: Chariots of the Gods (1968) by Erich von Däniken in which they are interpreted as evidence that extraterrestrial civilizations visited pre-modern earth and influenced historic and pre-historic events.

Imagining then trying to prevent an interesting end of the world scenario, is a well established plot-line in storytelling and fiction. Each tale will have unique dramatic twists. In The HAB Theory, another "capsizing" is overdue, perhaps delayed because the Southern polar ice cap is (by sheer coincidence), centered on top of a land continent, but nevertheless probable, because the Northern polar icecap is centered over the Arctic Ocean.

In the mid-1970s, global cooling was a more common popular headline than global warming, so that fit rather well with this plotline.

No form of a "capsizing" hypothesis is currently accepted among the scientific community.
