= Ghostkeeper =

- Original poster artwork
- Directed by: James Makichuk
- Written by: James Makichuk; Doug MacLeod
- Produced by: Howard J. Cole
- Starring: Riva Spier; Georgie Collins; Murray Ord; Sheri McFadden
- Cinematography: John Holbrook
- Edited by: Stan Cole
- Music by: Paul Zaza
- Production company: Badland Pictures
- Distributed by: New World Pictures
- Release date: March 3, 1982 (Calgary)
- Running time: 87 minutes
- Country: Canada
- Language: English
- Budget: CA$650,000–$1 million (Note: Sources vary regarding the film's final budget: A December 1980 article from the Calgary Herald lists a budget of $650,000, while a March 1982 piece notes a budget of $750,000. Another article detailing a promotional interview segment for the film in October 1981 indicates the film had a budget of $1 million.)

Ghostkeeper is a 1981 Canadian supernatural slasher film directed by James Makichuk, and starring Riva Spier, Georgie Collins, and Murray Ord. Its plot centers on a trio of snowmobilers in the Canadian Rockies who become stranded at an abandoned hotel where the elderly female innkeeper is hiding an evil entity within the building. The film is inspired by the Windigo legend of North America.

Filmed in Banff, Alberta under a tax shelter in December 1980, the film had an unstable financial situation and the filmmakers nearly halted the production mid-way through due to depletion of its budget. The film was given a brief theatrical release in Canada and was released directly to video in the United States by New World Pictures. It has attained a cult following in the years since its release.

The independent cult label Code Red Releasing later acquired the film, and released on DVD for the first time in April 2012. In August 2017, they reissued the film on Blu-ray featuring a new 2K scan of the original film elements.

== Plot ==
Jenny, Marty, and Chrissy are spending their New Year's Eve on a snowmobiling trip in the Rocky Mountains. After talking with a storekeeper at a ski shop, the three decide to go riding before dark, but end up caught in a blizzard. Looming before them is a seemingly abandoned hotel at the top of the snow trail, isolated from tourists and miles away from the skiing area. The three enter the building to escape the increasingly harsh conditions, and find that the heat is on, but there are no lights. As night falls, they start a fire and tell stories and reminisce. Marty decides to go into the hotel kitchen where he finds an old woman lurking. She is brash and apprehensive of their presence, and they learn that she lives in the hotel with two unseen sons.

Though hesitant, the woman lodges them in rooms. Marty and Jenny argue in their bedroom, while Chrissy goes down the hallway to take a bath since the plumbing in the rooms is obsolete. While in the bathtub, Chrissy is attacked by one of the sons, Danny, and held underwater. A restless Jenny goes to check on Chrissy, but the candle-lit bathroom is empty; Jenny then runs into the old woman and they have a conversation about the hotel and her sons. Meanwhile, Danny carries Chrissy to the basement of the hotel, where he slits her throat and then stores her body in a freezer. Jenny awakens in the night and hears the old woman talking to someone downstairs.

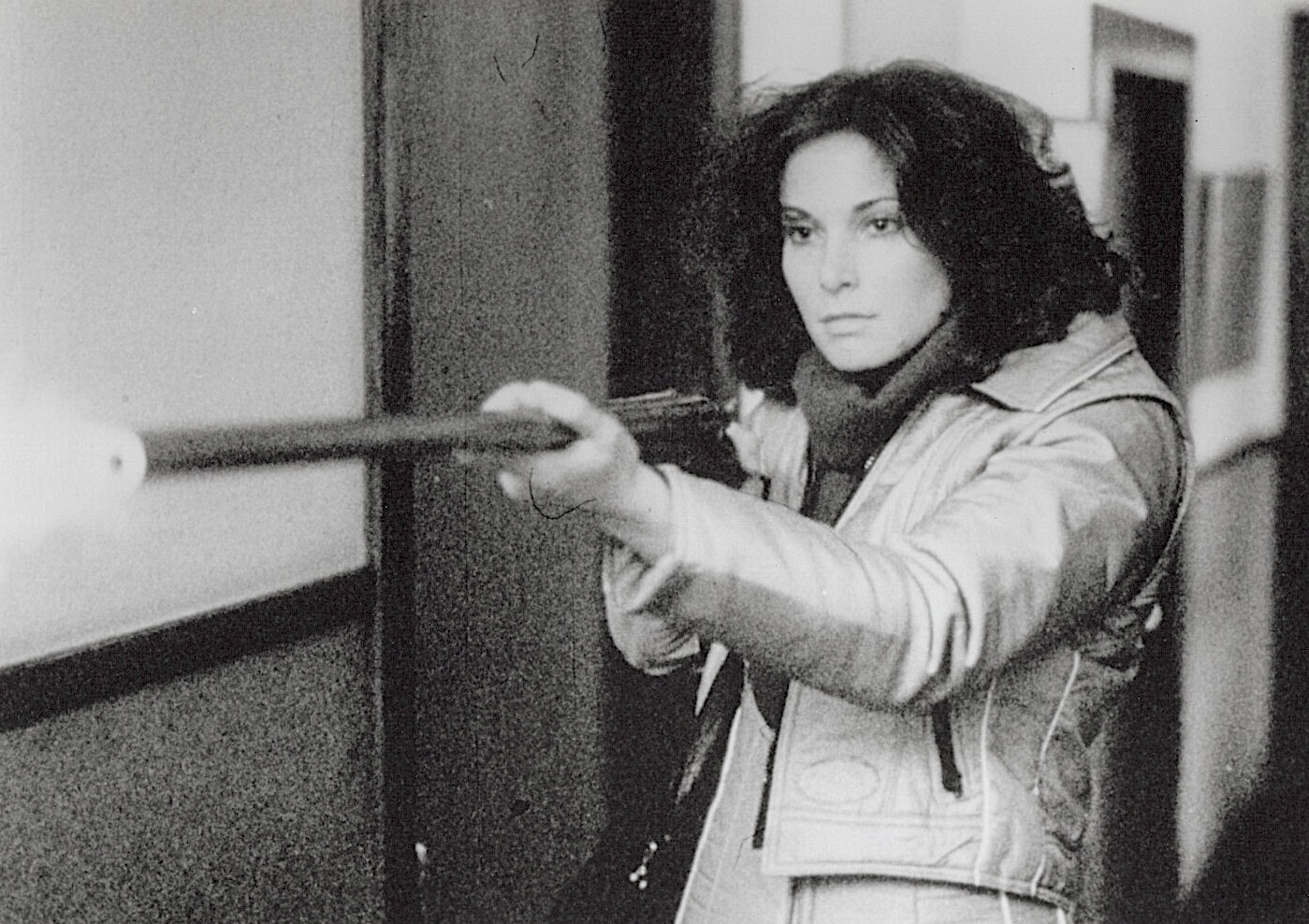
Riva Spier as Jenny in the film's climactic sequence

The next morning, Marty goes outside to the snowmobiles to activate them, with no success. Suspecting that they have been tampered with, he goes outside to an old shed for tools, while Jenny stays in the kitchen with the old woman, who is carving up cooked meat. After accepting the tea from the offering woman, Jenny inquires about Chrissy's disappearance, but the old woman is evasive. Jenny returns to a lounge in the hotel where she realizes she has been drugged, and falls unconscious. She awakens in the basement, where she finds a book on First Nations folklore and reads that a Wendigo is often "kept" by an old woman who had the power passed on to her from another. She opens the freezer and discovers a human Windigo inside, being the old woman's second son. Danny then comes down to the basement with a chainsaw and chases Jenny throughout the hotel, up into the attic. Jenny exits through a window onto a small balcony; she manages to push him over, where he is impaled on an iron fence below.

Jenny finds Marty outside, who appears to be possessed and rambling to himself while wandering into the woods. Meanwhile, the storekeeper arrives at the hotel, where he is stabbed by the old woman. Jenny re-enters the hotel, where she finds Danny's body has been dragged into the foyer. She locates a shotgun in a storage room, and is confronted by the old woman, who claims that she is Jenny's deceased mother. Jenny shoots and kills her. Strangely overtaken, Jenny visits the Wendigo in the freezer and says: "I will look after you now." Outside, Jenny observes Marty's frozen body with no reaction. Returning inside the hotel, Jenny sits in a lounge chair in front of the fireplace as the old woman's voice is heard.

== Cast ==
- Riva Spier as Jenny
- Murray Ord as Marty
- Sheri McFadden as Chrissy
- Georgie Collins as Ghostkeeper
- Les Kimber as Storekeeper
- Bill Grove as Danny (credited as Billy Grove)
- John MacMillan as Windigo

== Production ==
=== Development ===
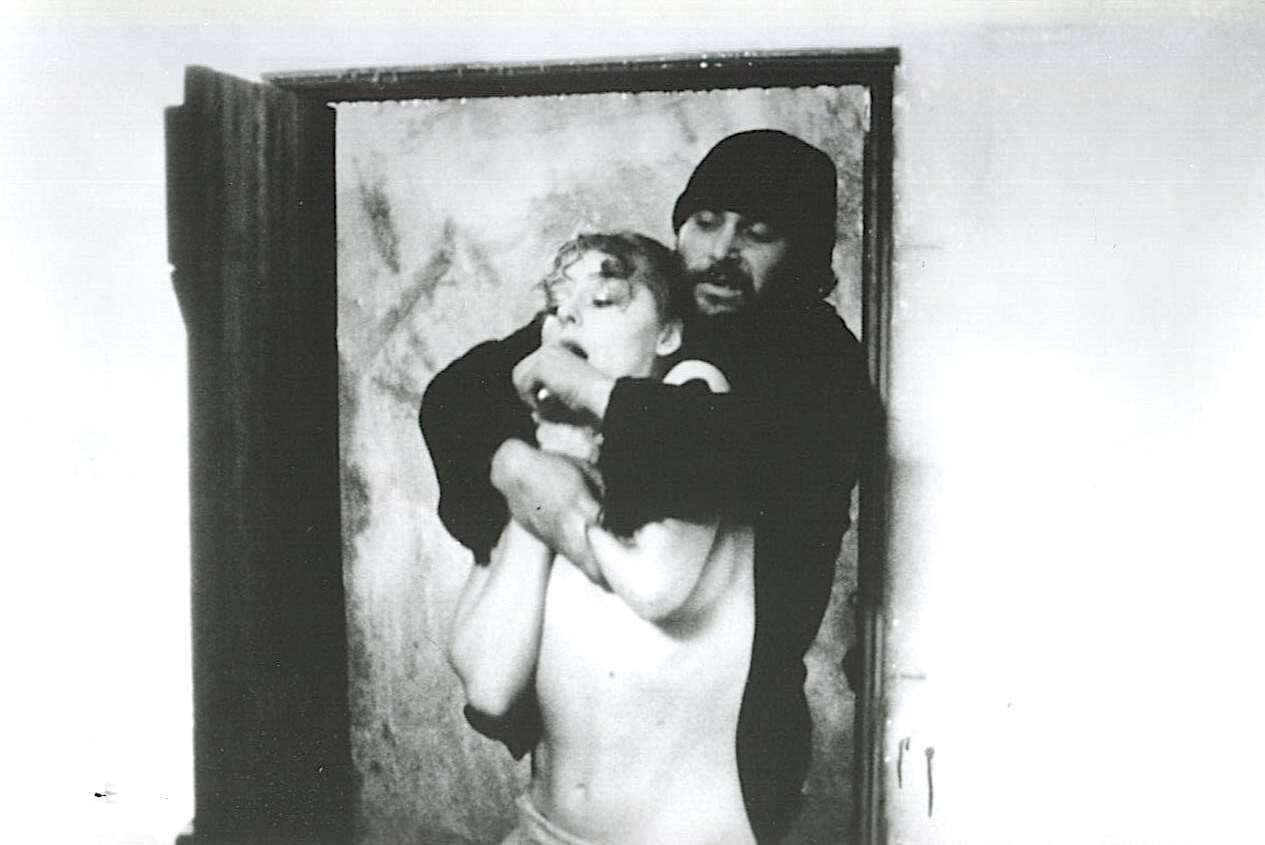
Sherri McFadden and Bill Grove in a publicity still

Ghostkeeper was co-written and directed by James Makichuk in his directorial debut, having started his career as a camera operator for local television stations before directing commercial ads. After three years of this, Makichuk would later admit that he had grown tired of the job and decided to make his next project a feature film. Development for the film would only start after Makichuk had a chance meeting with writer and producer Doug MacLeod during a film project with a mutual friend of the two, which later fell through. The two quickly became good friends, deciding to collaborate on a feature-length project, wanting to capitalize on the growing popularity of the horror genre after the recent success with John Carpenter's Halloween (1978), that could be filmed at a single location with a small cast.

Early on in the development process, the filmmakers chose the Deer Lodge, a winter hotel in Banff, Alberta as the primary filming location. For the film's antagonist, filmmakers drew inspiration from the Native American legend of the Wendigo, a cannibalistic spirit that possessed humans, roaming the wilderness in search of human flesh. According to Makichuk, the Wendigo was originally intended to have a more substantial role in the film, but many scenes had to be removed due to budget restraints.

=== Casting ===
The majority of the cast were locally-hired actors in the Calgary area, with the exception being lead Riva Spier, who was an actress hired out of Montreal. For the majority of the cast, Ghostkeeper was their first and final film credit; Georgie Collins was primarily a well-known stage actress in Calgary, and was cast in the role of the mysterious elderly hotel proprietor. Spier, who had previously starred in minor roles prior to the film, would later go on to have a successful voice acting career.

John MacMillan, who stood 6 feet 6 inches (1.98 m) in stature, was cast in the role of the Windigo.

=== Filming ===
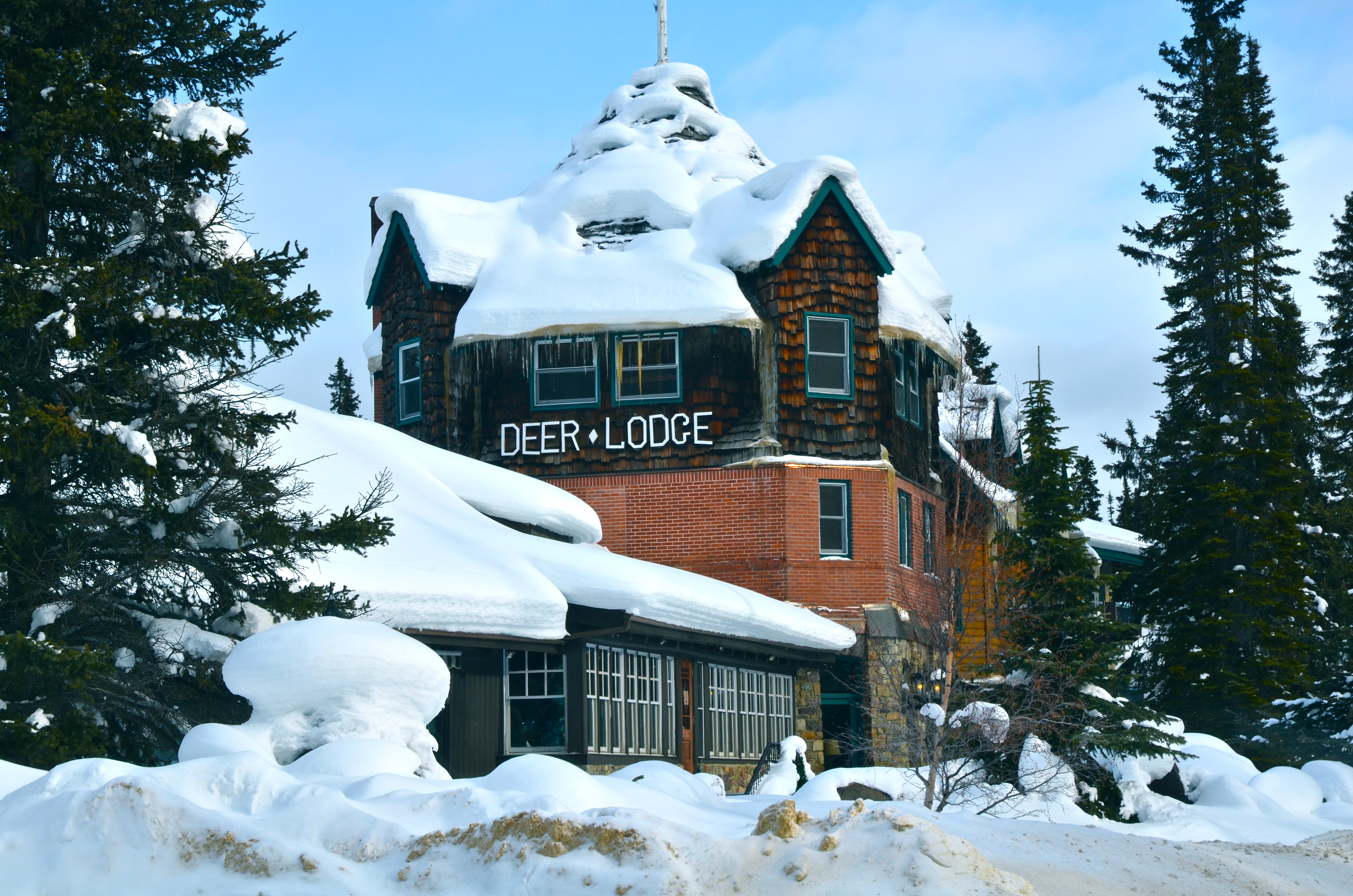
Deer Lodge in Banff, Alberta served as a primary filming location.

Ghostkeeper was filmed on location in Lake Louise and the Banff National Park in Alberta, Canada. The Deer Lodge Hotel in Banff was used as the primary shooting location, which was facilitated by screenwriter Doug MacLeod, who had previously worked at the hotel. Filming began on November 30, 1980, and finished on December 23, 1980. The film was photographed by cinematographer John Holbrook. Producer Harry Cole commented during the shoot: "It's a producer's dream— it has one location in a controlled environment." Cole also described the film as more a "suspense movie" along the lines of Psycho (1960). During principal photography, the location was hit with several blizzards.

Ghostkeeper was produced via a tax shelter on a budget of approximately CA$750,000–$1 million. Its tax shelter funding made the production's financial situation rather unstable; James Makichuk said that he was given the option of halting the film's production when the funding began to run low, but he pursued to finish the film anyway—

They told us that the money is almost all gone. We had a choice of stopping the movie, pulling the plug and I said, ‘No way, we've gotten over half of it shot.’ So every day I made up the scene as we're going along, which is not the way to make a movie. That's what made it so uneven and without the terrific ending that we had hoped for. But the thing I wanted with Johnny Holbrook, who is a great cameraman, is to have a mood. A dark sort of mood, an ominous thing going on – and I think for the most part it works. The prints that got finished were so dark but the distributors, those guys, they don't care at all.

According to Makichuk, prior to the depletion of the budget, his original intention was to film a much longer ending, including an extended chase sequence with Spier and the Wendigo creature on the rooftop of the Deer Lodge hotel.

=== Alternate opening ===
An alternate opening to the film was shot by distributors two years after the initial production. In the opening, a young man flees from the hotel during the day, running into the woods until backing up against a tree. While pinned, he is killed (presumably by Danny) and stabbed with a sharp wooden stake. This opening was not featured in the 1986 VHS.

== Music ==
The film's score was composed by Paul Zaza, who also composed music for fellow Canadian slasher film productions Prom Night (1980), My Bloody Valentine (1981), and Curtains (1983). Zaza got on board due to the involvement of film editor Stan Cole. According to Zaza, he scored the film over one weekend, and recycled some musical cues and themes that were also used in Prom Night.

== Release ==
Ghostkeeper was to screened out of competition at the Cannes Film Festival in May 1981. On October 29, 1981, director Makichuk appeared in a CBC television interview segment promoting the film, which included the airing of two scenes. It subsequently had its North American theatrical premiere at Calgary's Tivoli Theater on March 3, 1982. In November 1982, it was reported that the film had been sold for distribution in 18 countries, including the United States, where it was acquired by American Cinema Marketing.

The distributor Canadian International Pictures began exhibiting the film at revival screenings in North America beginning in late 2025, with an inaugural screening at Seattle's Beacon Theatre on December 6, 2025. This print is sourced from the only surviving theatrical 35 mm print.

=== Home media ===
Ghostkeeper did not receive a home video release until September 1986, when it was released in the United States through New World Pictures' home video branch.

Director James Makichuk stated in a 2008 interview that he was trying to facilitate a DVD release via Netflix with a quality print of the film.

In April 2012, Ghostkeeper was released for the first time on DVD through Code Red Releasing. The DVD includes a commentary with James Makichuck, Riva Spier and Murray Ord, an interview with director of photography John Holbrook as well as an interview with actress Georgie Collins. The film is presented in 1.78.1 anamorphic widescreen for the first time on video and has been restored from the only known existing film elements.

On August 18, 2017, Code Red issued a Blu-ray edition of the film featuring a new 2K scan of the original film elements.

In January 2026, Canadian International Pictures released a pre-order via the Vinegar Syndrome online store for a new Blu-ray release of the film. This release features a new 4K scan from the only known surviving theatrical print of the film, with newly-commissioned cast and crew interviews, audio commentaries, as well as archival features from prior releases.

== Reception ==
Rosemary McCracken of the Calgary Herald commented on the film's screenplay, noting that it carries "distinct echoes of Stanley Kubrick's The Shining," adding that "despite the flaws in the script, the film has a fair bit going for it. The performances are a notch above those being offered in much of the American horror fare being served up in our theaters." John Brooker of the Staines Informer was unimpressed by the film, noting a "plodding pace which will satisfy only undemanding horror fans."

Of contemporary reviews, the horror film website The Terror Trap gave the film a positive review stating, "Not for all tastes, the methodically paced Ghostkeeper is an exercise in disciplined mood generation; its bare claustrophobia either works for the viewer or not. But for those who prefer their chills straightforward, pre-sneer and pre-sarcasm, Keeper can be a most rewarding snow trap".

J. A. Kerswell from Hysteria Lives! gave the film a negative review calling the film "flawed", and "muddled". In The Blockbuster Entertainment Guide to Movies and Videos (1999), the film was rated two-and-a-half stars out of five, deemed "an absurd thriller." Eric Cotenas of DVD Drive-In noted the film's prominent atmosphere and drew comparisons to Stephen King's The Shining as well as cinematographer John Holbrook's "aesthetic response to the desolate location."

== See also ==
- Folklore of the United States
- Wendigo

== Sources ==
- Blockbuster (1998). The Blockbuster Entertainment Guide to Movies and Videos. New York City, New York: Dell Publishing. ISBN 978-0-440-22598-0.
- Freitag, Gina; Loiselle, André, eds. (2009). The Canadian Horror Film: Terror of the Soul. Toronto, Ontario: University of Toronto Press. ISBN 978-1-442-62850-2.
- Vatnsdal, Caelum (2004). They Came From Within: A History Of Canadian Horror Cinema. Winnipeg, Manitoba: Arbeiter Ring. ISBN 978-1-894-03721-1.
