= Incident at Hawk's Hill =

1971 children's book by Allan W. Eckert

- Author: Allan W. Eckert
- Illustrator: John Schoenherr
- Language: English
- Genre: Historical fiction
- Publisher: Little, Brown
- Publication date: 1971
- Pages: 207
- ISBN: 0-553-26696-9
- Followed by: Return to Hawk's Hill

Incident at Hawk's Hill is a 1971 children's book by naturalist and writer Allan W. Eckert. Supposedly based on a true event, it is a historical novel centering on a six-year-old boy who gets lost on the Canadian prairie and survives for two months thanks to a mother badger. Though the Newbery is an award for children's literature, Incident at Hawk's Hill was originally published as an adult novel. It was a Reader's Digest selection. It was also an American Library Association Notable book.

== Plot ==
Incident at Hawk's Hill opens in 1870, on Hawk's Hill, the farm of William and Esther MacDonald, set in the Canadian Prairies about twenty miles north of Winnipeg, Manitoba, Canada. The MacDonalds have four children. The fourth child, six-year-old Ben, is "the greatest problem of the MacDonald family". Highly intelligent but mute around most people, Ben especially loves his older brother John and mother, Esther. He feels more comfortable with the wild animals on the farm than with most people. The MacDonalds' new neighbor is George Burton, a thief, and bully who is always accompanied by his mean dog, Lobo. In the vicinity is a huge, pregnant female badger, which is preparing tunnels and a sett or den in a rock outcropping, before the birth of her offspring.

One day, Ben follows a prairie chicken and becomes lost away from home. He shelters in a rocky area, where he encounters the badger sow. She is hiding after being injured in one of Burton's traps. While she was trapped, her babies died of a lack of food. She begins to bring food to Ben, and he begins imitating her movement and sounds. He starts to sleep by day and follows her hunting at night. One night when the dog Lobo attacks the badger, Ben bites the dog, distracting it, and the badger kills it. Despite the badger's attempts to feed Ben, he begins to fade from starvation.

The search for Ben lasted two months. All but his family believe that the boy likely drowned in the nearby Red River. But Ben's father vows never to stop looking, and the entire family hunts for the boy daily. John finally discovers Ben among the rocks; when he reaches toward him, Ben reacts like a wild animal, growling and biting. John subdues Ben and takes him home.

The mother badger follows and eventually becomes uneasily accepted by the family as Ben's protector. As Ben begins to talk about his experiences, he becomes more comfortable with people. He even looks forward to going to school. But as Burton comes to their homestead, he sees the family badger. Thinking he's doing the right thing he shoots the badger injuring it badly. A showdown between his father and George Burton over the badger finally unites Ben and his father. Ben's adventure is re-interpreted by local whites as a parable of God's care for the lost, and by the First Nations as a tale bringing honor to their chief.

== Background ==
Every edition of Incident at Hawk's Hill contains this author's note: "The story which follows is a slightly fictionalized version of an incident which actually occurred at the time and place noted." However, Eckert provided no documentation of the incident. Author and professor Kenneth Kidd, who has studied stories of feral children, believes Eckert may have based his book on local legends. In his article, "Leave It to Badger: Allan W. Eckert's Incident at Hawk's Hill", Kidd says of the author's note, "I have not been able to find anything else about the incident behind the fiction."

The Manitoba Historical Society magazine Manitoba Pageant in 1960 published an article entitled "The Boy Who Lived in a Badger Hole". The article details sufficient information from an 1873 reported incident of a lost boy, found after 10 days living in a badger hole, to be the basis of Eckert's account. Eckert's use of the word "slightly" before "fictionalized" may be reason for debate.

== Critical reception ==
Incident at Hawk's Hill was a Newbery Honor book in 1972. It also received a Recognition of Merit from the George C. Stone Center for Children's Books, the Austrian Juvenile Book of the Year Award, and was named an ALA Notable Book.

Kirkus Reviews, however, did not give the book a positive review, calling it an "overblown and curiously old-fashioned tale...".

== Editions and adaptations ==
Incident at Hawk's Hill was initially published as an adult novel, and it was selected as a Reader's Digest Condensed Book. The illustrations by John Schoenherr have been used in both the original adult and later children's editions, although the cover art has changed over the years.

Disney adapted the novel for a television movie. Called The Boy who Talked to Badgers, it was telecast on The Wonderful World of Disney in 1975. Disney later sold this film to schools under the book title Incident at Hawk's Hill, as the book was by then known as a children's novel.
