= 29th Light Anti-Aircraft Regiment (New Zealand) =

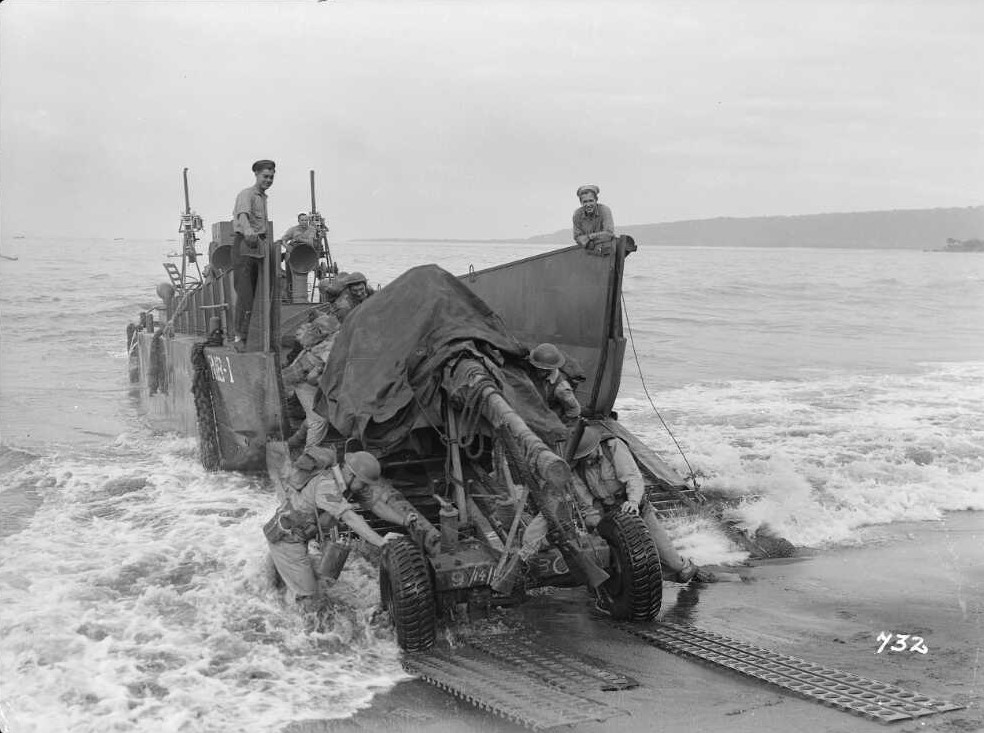
- A Bofors gun of 29th Light Anti-Aircraft Regiment being unloaded from a landing craft
- Active: 1942–1944
- Country: New Zealand
- Branch: New Zealand Military Forces
- Type: Air Defence
- Size: ~1000 personnel
- Part of: 3rd New Zealand Division
- Engagements: Second World War: Battle of Vella Lavella; Battle of the Treasury Islands; Battle of the Green Islands

The 29th Light Anti-Aircraft Regiment was an air defence regiment of the New Zealand Military Forces raised during the Second World War. It saw service as part of the 3rd New Zealand Division during the Solomon Islands campaign and was disbanded in October 1944.

== History ==
=== Formation ===
The 29th Light Anti-Aircraft Regiment was formed at Pahautanui in August 1942. By the end of September, four batteries had been formed—namely 207, 208, 209 and 214 batteries—with each battery armed with twelve Bofors 40 mm anti-aircraft guns.

=== Disbandment ===
Owing to manpower shortages, 29th Light Anti-Aircraft Regiment was disbanded along with the rest of the 3rd Division in October 1944. During the war, the regiment had lost 24 men killed and 46 wounded.
