= 38th Infantry Regiment "Neagoe Basarab" =

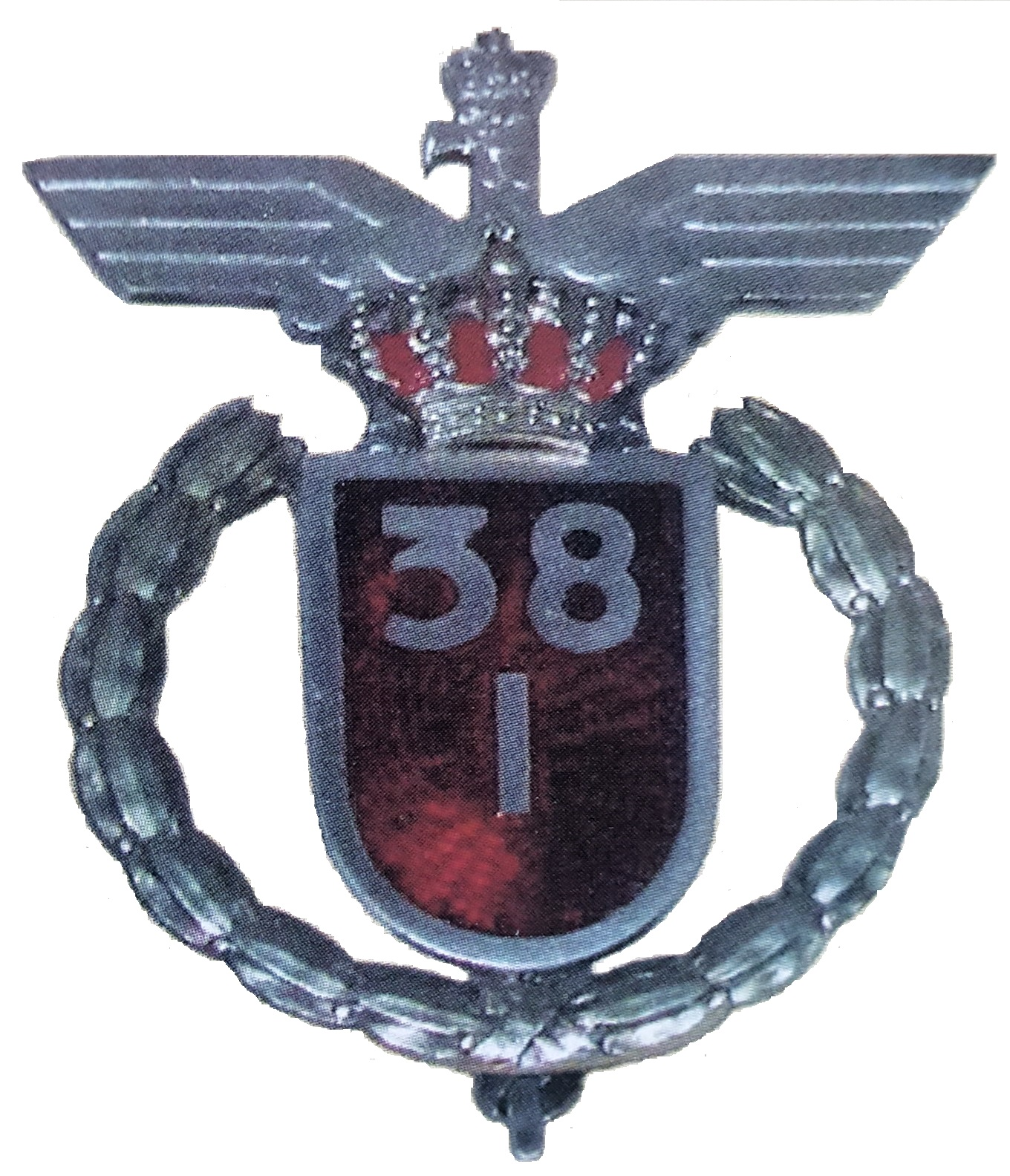
- Active: 1 October 1911 – 11 November 1918; 22 June 1941 – 19 August 1945
- Country: Romania
- Role: Infantry
- Size: 4,700
- Part of: 20th Infantry Brigade
- Garrison/HQ: Brăila
- Patron: Neagoe Basarab
- Engagements: Second Balkan War: Southern Dobruja Offensive; World War I: Dobruja Campaign; Battle of Bucharest; Battle of Mărășești; World War II: Siege of Odessa; Crimean campaign; Battle of the Caucasus

The 38th Infantry Regiment "Neagoe Basarab" was an infantry regiment of the Romanian Army.

== History ==
The 38th Infantry Regiment "Neagoe Basarab" was formed on 1 October 1911 by High Royal Decrees no. 1,196. It became attached to the 20th Infantry Brigade.

=== Second Balkan War ===
During the Second Balkan War, the regiment participated in the Southern Dobruja Offensive.

=== World War I ===
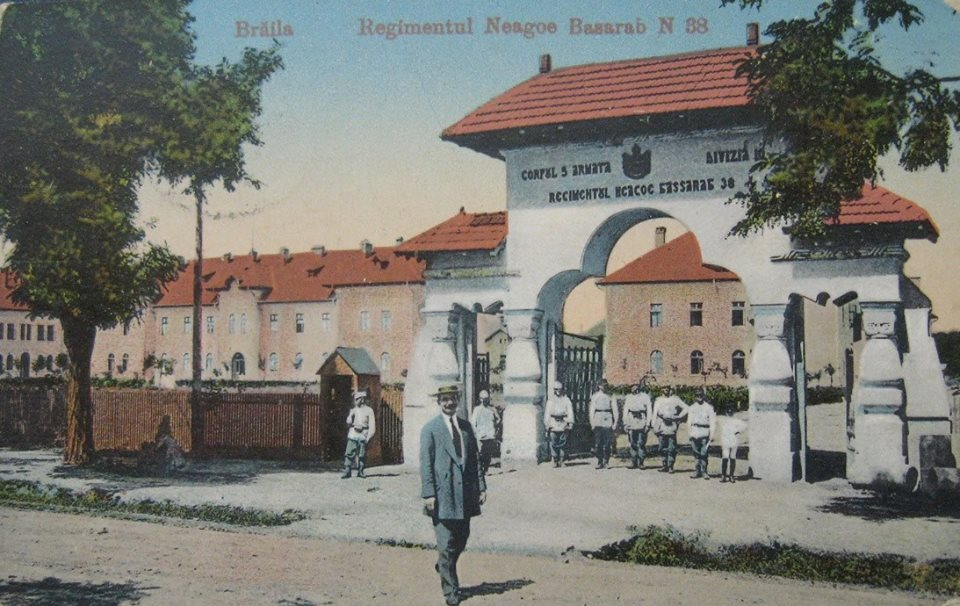
Barracks of the 38th Infantry Regiment, 1914

When Romania entered World War I, the regiment was commanded by Colonel Alexandru Bacalbașa. The regiment participated in numerous battles during the Dobruja Campaign where it suffered heavy casualties. Alongside the newly created 9th/19th Infantry Division, the 38th Regiment took part in the Battle of Bucharest.

=== World War II ===
The regiment was reformed on 22 June 1941. It would go on to participate in numerous battles throughout the war including the Siege of Odessa, the Crimean campaign, and the Battle of the Caucasus. The regiment was disbanded on 19 August 1945.

== Sources ==
- Asandei, Simion (Colonel) (1979), Regimentul „Neagoe Basarab” (in Romanian), Bucharest: Editura Militară
- Ioanițiu, Alexandru (Lt.-Colonel) (1929), Războiul României: 1916-1918 [Romanian War: 1916-1918] (in Romanian), vol. 1–2, Bucharest: Tipografia Geniului
- Tănasă, Horia (2016), Brăila în războiul întregirii naționale 1916-1918. Contribuția militară [Brăila in the War of National Unification 1916-1918. Military Contribution] (in Romanian), Brăila: Editura Istros
