= 17th Field Regiment (New Zealand) =

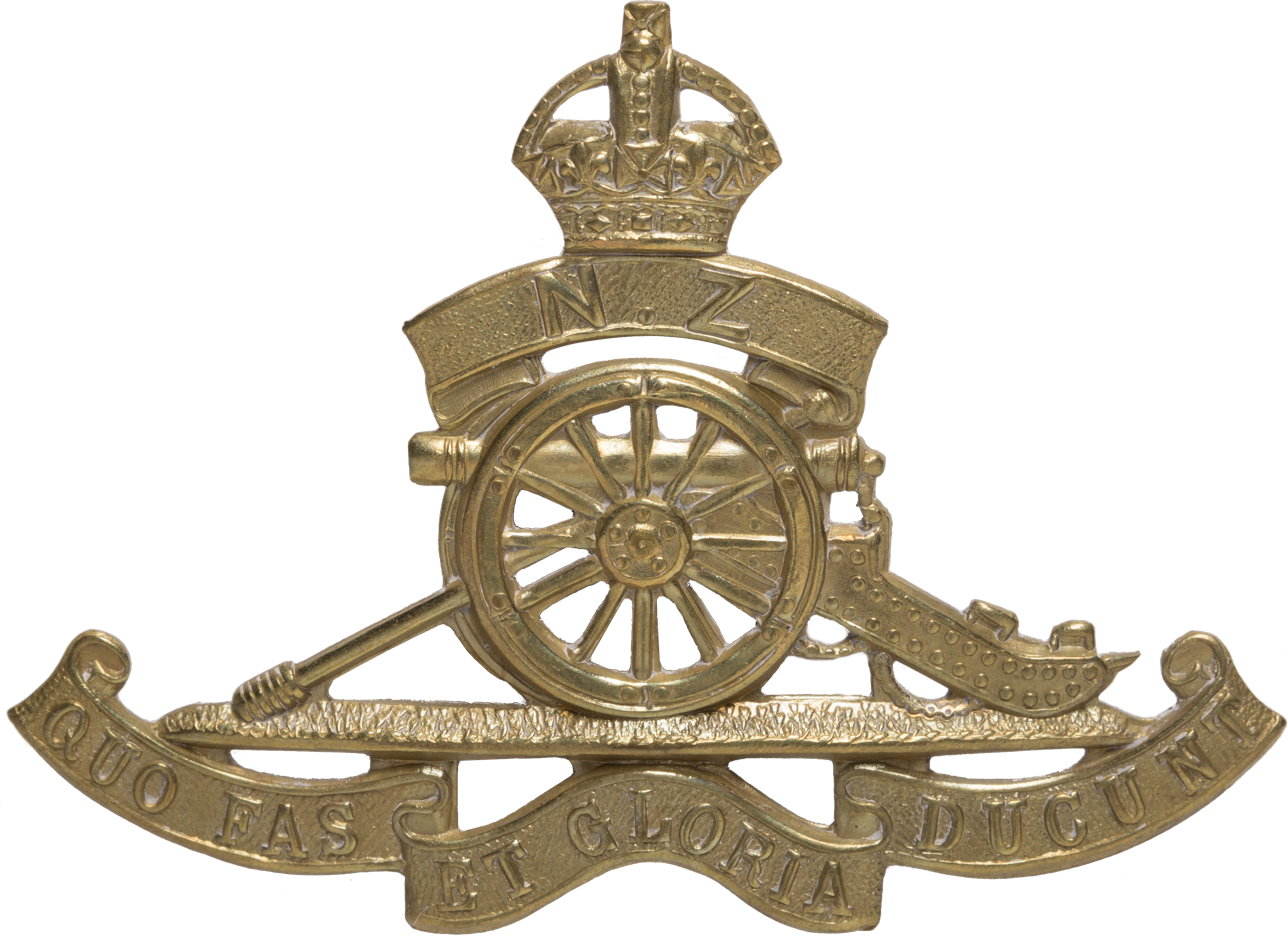
- Cap badge of the New Zealand Artillery
- Active: 1942–1944
- Country: New Zealand
- Branch: New Zealand Military Forces
- Type: Artillery
- Part of: 3rd New Zealand Division
- Engagements: Second World War: Land Battle of Vella Lavella; Battle of the Green Islands

The 17th Field Regiment was an artillery regiment of the New Zealand Military Forces raised during the Second World War. The regiment was formed on 2 September 1942 at Papakura Military Camp and consisted of 35 and 37 Batteries, which had formerly operated as independent batteries based in Fiji. In October they were joined by 12 Battery from the Territorial Force and the regiment departed for New Caledonia at the end of December. In September and October 1943, 17th Field Regiment took part in the Land Battle of Vella Lavella as part of the 14th Brigade Group and in February 1944 also took part in the Battle of the Green Islands. Due to manpower shortages, 17th Field Regiment was effectively disbanded in October 1944 along with the rest of the 3rd Division, although a small accounting party continued to exist until April 1945 to complete regimental records. Many of the men were sent with the 14th and 15th reinforcements to the 2nd New Zealand Division.
