= The Healers (film) =

- Promotional image
- Genre: Drama
- Written by: Howard Dimsdale; John Furia Jr.
- Directed by: Tom Gries
- Starring: John Forsythe
- Theme music composer: David Shire
- Country of origin: United States
- Original language: English

Production
- Executive producer: Jerry Thorpe
- Producers: John Furia, Jr. Sid McCoy
- Cinematography: Jack Woolf
- Editor: Michael A. Hoey
- Running time: 100 minutes
- Production company: Warner Bros. Television

Original release
- Network: NBC
- Release: May 22, 1974

The Healers is a 1974 American made-for-television drama film starring John Forsythe, Pat Harrington Jr., Katherine Woodville and Season Hubley. It originally aired May 22, 1974 on NBC.

== Synopsis ==
The director of an urban medical center deals with a variety of problems over the course of running the facility.

== Cast ==
- John Forsythe as Dr. Robert Kier
- Pat Harrington Jr. as Joe Tate
- Katherine Woodville as Claire Parlini
- Season Hubley as Ann Kilmer
- Anthony Zerbe as Dr. Albert Scanlon
- Beverly Garland as Laura Kier
- John McIntire as Dr. Ernest Wilson
- Yvonne Gilbert as Betty Kier
- Lance Kerwin as Kennedy Brown
- Michael C. Gwynne as Dr. Anton Balinowski
- Shelly Juttner as Nikki Kier
- Christian Juttner as Vince Kier
- Ellen Weston as Barbara, Secretary to Dr. Kier
