= 303rd Military Intelligence Battalion =

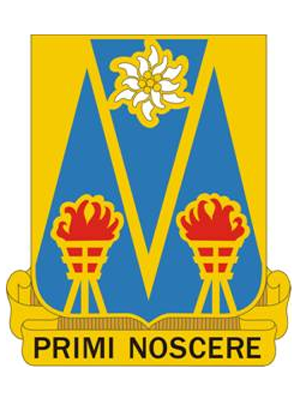
- 303rd Military Intelligence Battalion Distinctive Unit Insignia
- Country: United States
- Branch: U.S. Army
- Type: Military Intelligence
- Role: Provide intelligence analysis and collection support to Division, Corps, and Joint Task Force area of Operations
- Part of: 504th Battlefield Surveillance Brigade
- Garrison/HQ: Fort Cavazos
- Motto: PRIMI NOSCERE ("First To Know")

Commanders
- Current commander: LTC Brandon Maguire

Insignia
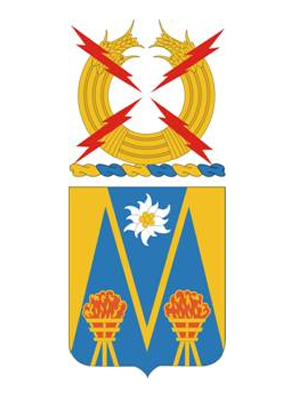
- Coat of arms

The 303rd Military Intelligence Battalion is the U.S. Army’s most decorated MI battalion, and is part of the 504th Military Intelligence Brigade located at Fort Cavazos, Texas. The mission of the 303rd Military Intelligence Battalion, "Longhorns," is to, on order, conduct multi-disciplined intelligence collection, exploitation, and limited analysis operations in support of the commander's information requirements during worldwide contingency missions within assigned areas of a Division, Corps, or Joint Task Force area of operations.

== History ==
The 303rd Military Intelligence Battalion’s lineage dates back to World War II when the 3253rd Signal Service Company, 303rd’s parent unit, was organized on 12 April 1944 and activated on 25 April 1944. Its mission was to gain intelligence from the interception of radio communications between German forces opposing Allied operations in France. Commanded by Captain Emory L. Jones, the 3253rd trained until 8 June at Wincham Hall, Cheshire and then moved to quarters at Burton Bradstock, Dorset. The company supported the XV Corps (US), part of Patton's 3d Army, and saw action in France, Germany, and Austria.

The 303rd Military Intelligence Battalion was first officially constituted as the 303rd Communications Reconnaissance Battalion. The Unit was activated on 25 September 1950 at Arlington Hall, Virginia, and consolidated on 17 July 1951 with the 540th Signal Service Company. The 303rd moved quickly deployed to the Korean War and joined with the 501st Communications Reconnaissance Group. The teamwork and intelligence collection gathered by the 303rd contributed tremendously toward the fulfillment of the United Nations campaign for world peace.

The 303rd Army Security Agency Battalion was activated on 15 June 1962 at Camp Wolters, Texas, where the battalion first became known as the "Longhorns." Between 1966 and 1971, the 303rd provided Radio Intelligence Support to the II Field Force in Long Binh, Vietnam.

In 2004, the 303rd Military Intelligence Battalion deployed in support of Operation Iraqi Freedom, earning the Meritorious Unit Commendation for its Service during OIF. The unit was cited for its performance as a multi-national Corps and Multinational Force which provided valuable and actionable operational intelligence. The unit deployed in 2006 in support of Operation Enduring Freedom for a 15-month deployment. It deployed to Iraq again on 10 Nov 2008, when the unit supported Multi-National Corps – Iraq and multi-national divisions Baghdad and South. The unit's numerous partnerships with military transition and provincial reconstruction teams greatly contributed to the increased readiness and capabilities of both the Iraqi army and police forces.

In June 2011, the 303rd, as part of the 504th BfSB, deployed to Afghanistan. Soldiers with the 303rd MI Battalion Task Force Longhorns conducted more than 1,600 combat operations, generated 25,000 intelligence reports, captured 45 high-value targets and located 48 weapons caches and strongly supported the Afghan reintegration program, a top priority for the government of Afghanistan. In September 2013, the 303rd again deployed to Afghanistan to provide intelligence support to coalition forces in eastern Afghanistan.
