= Blood Games (film) =

- VHS cover art
- Directed by: Tanya Rosenberg
- Screenplay by: Craig L. Clyde; James L. Hennessy; George P. Saunders
- Story by: George P. Saunders; Jim Makichuk
- Starring: Gregory Scott Cummins; Laura Albert; Shelley Abblett
- Edited by: Rick Mitchell
- Music by: Greg Turner
- Production company: Epic Productions
- Distributed by: RCA/Columbia Pictures Home Video
- Release date: 1990
- Running time: 90 minutes
- Country: United States
- Language: English

Blood Games is a 1990 American exploitation film directed by Tanya Rosenberg and starring Gregory Cummins, Laura Albert, and Shelley Abblett. The film concerns the plight of a stranded all-girl baseball team.

== Plot ==
After Babe & the Ball Girls, a team of female softball players, trounces the local team, their travel bus breaks down in the woods. Attempting to hike to safety, they end up getting lost and the group is set upon by disgruntled fans of the losing team. They are beaten, raped and some murdered. They desperately fight back with baseball bats and guns.

== Cast ==
- Laura Albert as "Babe"
- Ross Hagen as "Midnight"
- George Buck Flower as Vern (credited as Ernest Wall)
- Julie Hall as "Stoney"
- Ken Carpenter as Mino Collins (credited as Luke Shay)
- Gregory Scott Cummins as Roy Collins
- Shelley Abblett as Donna
- Don Dowe as Holt
- Rhyve Sawyer as Wanda
- Paula Manga as Louise
- Sabrina Hills as Connie
- Randi Randolph as Ingrid
- Sonjia Redd as "Shorty"
- Lisa Zambrano as Mickey
- Doc Willis as Ronnie

== Reception ==
From contemporary reviews, Variety referred to the film as an "attractively packaged but uninteresting entry for vid fans" noting that Tanya Rosenberg's direction was "below par" and that the "cast is attractive but never convincing as athletes. Acting is generally poor." Michael Weldon wrote the film suffers from having too many slow motion scenes, but declared it was "not as bad as it could have been".

From retrospective reviews, John Kenneth Muir wrote in his book Horror Films of the 1990s that the film was "a horror movie that is more than just watchable. It's compelling, entertaining and scary. And, yes, entirely exploitive." Muir compared the film to I Spit on Your Grave, stating that Blood Games "panders in true exploitation movie fashion" with long locker room and shower scenes but also with the way it exploits women's bodies it also makes a point that they are exploited creatures. In discussing the chick flicks of the horror genre, author Philip Green wrote that Blood Games is "also the most visually erotic of the movies in this genre",

== Home media ==
In the 1990s, Blood Games was released on VHS.

In 2020, a 2K restoration of Blood Games was released on Blu-ray by Vinegar Syndrome.
