= 504th Military Intelligence Brigade =

Military intelligence brigade of the III Armored Corps, US Army

- 504th Expeditionary Military Intelligence Brigade (EMIB) shoulder sleeve insignia
- Country: United States
- Branch: United States Army
- Type: Military Intelligence
- Role: Provide intelligence analysis and collection support to III Armored Corps
- Part of: III Armored Corps
- Garrison/HQ: Fort Hood

Insignia
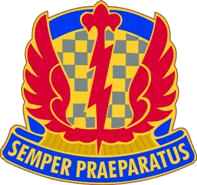
- Distinctive unit insignia of the brigade

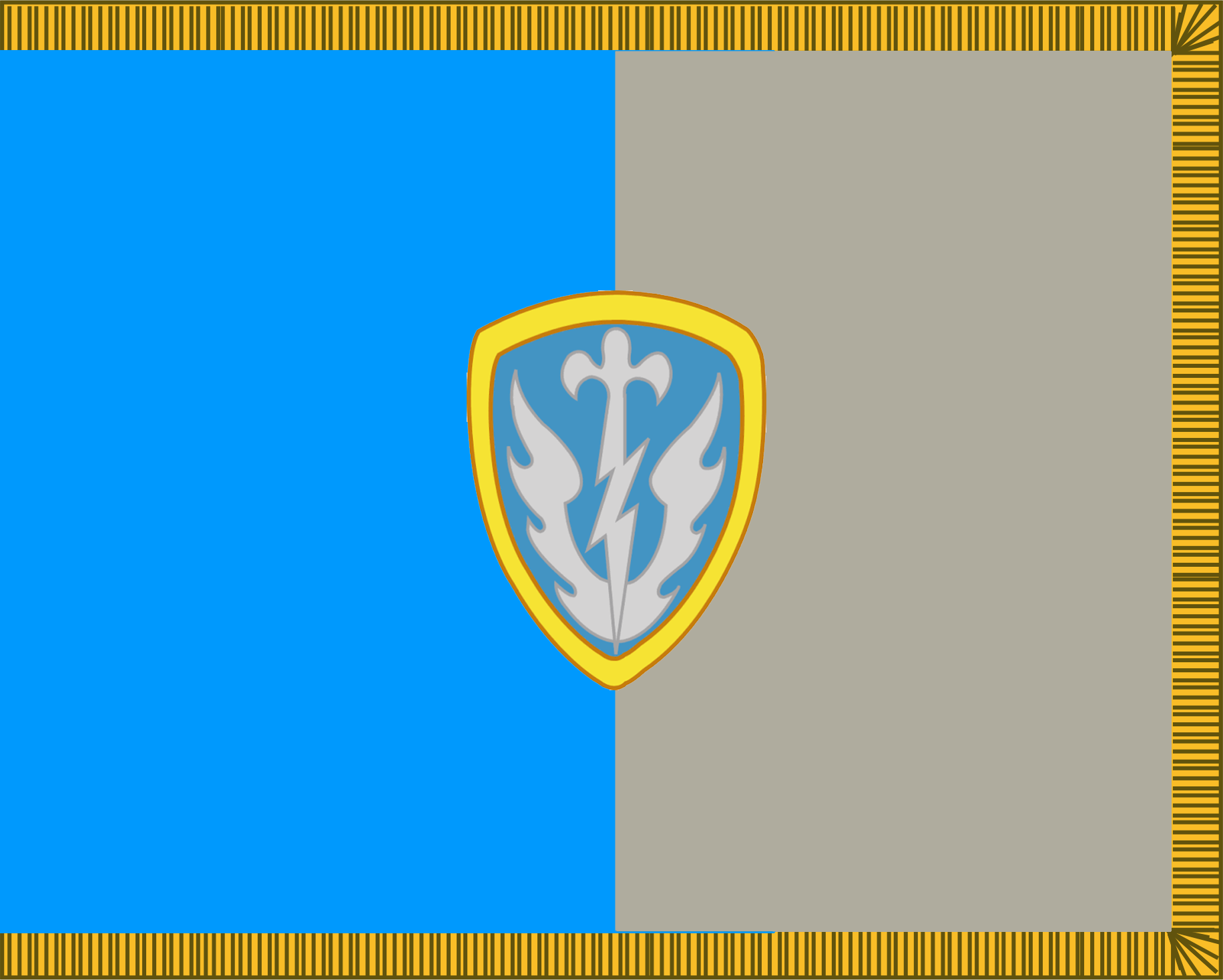
- 504th Military Intelligence Brigade Flag

The 504th Military Intelligence Brigade (504th MIB) is located at Fort Hood, Texas. The brigade is tasked to improve the situational awareness for commanders at division level or higher, so they can adapt their units combat power for the current operations. For this the Military Intelligence Brigades can deploy unmanned aerial vehicles, signals gathering equipment, human intelligence collectors and long range surveillance patrols.

From 2007 to 2015 the 504th served as an expeditionary military intelligence brigade (EMIB) becoming one of three active duty Surveillance Brigades of the United States Army. In 2015, the brigade returned to its original name and mission as the 504th Military Intelligence Brigade conducting intelligence, surveillance, and reconnaissance in support of III Armored Corps.

The 504th Military Intelligence Brigade is currently composed of:

- Headquarters and Headquarters Company
- 163rd Military Intelligence Battalion
- 303rd Military Intelligence Battalion

== History ==
The 504th BfSB traces its lineage to the 137th Signal Radio Intelligence Company (Aviation). Activated in the early days of World War II the unit redesignated as 137th Signal Radio Intelligence Company. The unit earned battle streamers for the campaigns of Northern France, Central Europe and the Rhineland.

After World War II the brigades name and tasks were subject to many changes, but on 21 April 1978 the 504th Military Intelligence Group (Corps) was activated and began its evolution to a Military Intelligence Brigade. On 16 September 1985, the brigade was designated as the 504th Military Intelligence Brigade (Corps) at Fort Cavazos and supported the III Armored Corps. At that time the brigade consisted of a Headquarters & Headquarters Detachment and three Military Intelligence Battalions:

- 15th Military Intelligence Battalion (Aerial Exploitation)
- 163rd Military Intelligence Battalion (Tactical Exploitation)
- 303rd Military Intelligence Battalion (Operations/Counter Electronics Warfare Intelligence)

With the Transformation of the United States Army the 504th was redesignated as the 504th Battlefield Surveillance Brigade. To fulfill its new mission the brigade relinquished control of the 15th Military Intelligence Battalion and activated three new companies: a Network Support Company, a Forward Support Company and a Long Range Surveillance Troop (B-38th CAV) while restructuring the Headquarters & Headquarters Detachment into a company and expanding its missions. The two remaining Military Intelligence battalions assumed identical missions as intelligence collection battalions.

The brigade's Troop B (LRS), 38th Cavalry Regiment, activated on 16 February 2008, was reorganized and redesignated on 24 June 2010 as Troop C (LRS)(ABN) as part of the newly activated 2nd Squadron, 38th Cavalry Regiment with Headquarters and Headquarters Troop (HHT), Troop A, Troop B, and Troop C, 2d Squadron, 38th Cavalry Regiment.

While Troop C within various squadrons of the 38th Cavalry Regiment is sometimes locally referred to as Company C, HQ Department of the Army policy states, "HQDA approved MTOE does not allow for a separate infantry company." In the case of the 1st Squadron, HQ DA wrote, "As documented, the company is a subordinate of 1–38th CAV and as such will carry the designation of Troop C, 1–38th CAV." The policy applies to the 2d Squadron, 38th Cavalry Regiment as well.
