= Roswell: The Aliens Attack =

- Promotional poster
- Genre: Science fiction
- Written by: Jim Makichuk
- Directed by: Brad Turner
- Starring: Steven Flynn; Kate Greenhouse; Heather Hanson
- Music by: Fred Mollin
- Countries of origin: United States; Canada
- Original language: English

Production
- Executive producers: Steve White; Sheri Singer
- Cinematography: Robert Steadman
- Editor: Robert Lower
- Running time: 96 minutes
- Production companies: Credo Entertainment Group; Singer/White Entertainment; Paramount Network Television

Original release
- Network: UPN
- Release: February 4, 1999

Roswell: The Aliens Attack is a 1999 science fiction television film directed by Brad Turner, written by Jim Makichuk, and starring Steven Flynn, Kate Greenhouse, and Heather Hanson. The story is about two aliens who escape from Roswell, New Mexico, in 1947 with intentions to blow up the earth. Roswell: The Aliens Attack was filmed in Winnipeg, Manitoba, Canada. It premiered on UPN on February 4, 1999.

== Cast ==
- Steven Flynn as John Dearman
- Kate Greenhouse as Katie Harras
- Heather Hanson as Eve Flowers
- Brent Stait as Capt. Philips
- Sean McCann as Col. Woodburn
- Donnelly Rhodes as Tyler
- Ben Baxter as Sam Harras

== See also ==
- List of television films produced for UPN
