= The Boy Who Talked to Badgers =

1975 film by Gary Nelson

- Based on: Incident at Hawk's Hill by Allan W. Eckert
- Written by: Sheldon Stark
- Directed by: Gary Nelson
- Starring: Christian Juttner; Carl Betz; Salome Jens; Georgie Collins
- Narrated by: Denver Pyle
- Country of origin: United States
- Original language: English

Production
- Producer: James Algar
- Production location: Alberta, Canada
- Cinematography: Gilbert Hubbs
- Running time: 100 minutes
- Production company: Walt Disney Productions

Original release
- Network: NBC
- Release: September 14 – September 21, 1975

The Boy Who Talked to Badgers is a 1975 American made-for-television adventure film directed by Gary Nelson, starring Christian Juttner and Carl Betz. It was produced by Walt Disney Productions and based on the novel Incident at Hawk's Hill by Allan W. Eckert. The film was originally broadcast on NBC as a two-part episode on The Wonderful World of Disney on September 14 and 21, 1975.

== Plot ==
Benjy (Juttner) is a six-year-old Canadian boy who prefers the company of animals over humans and tries to spend as much time as possible with his animal friends. His parents realize this could eventually become a problem, but they don't have the heart to take away Benjy's only pleasure.

The boy befriends a badger. On one of Benjy's nature walks, he tries catching trout in a stream. He wanders too far out and gets trapped in a raging river and is carried far from his home. After over a week-long search, brother John finds Benjy. He had been living in a cave shared with a badger. Old Badger shared his fish catches with the boy.

After a happy family reunion, trapper Burton returns to the ranch and shoots the badger. The animal dies, but Ben returns to Old Badger's grave years later as an adult.

== Cast ==
- Carl Betz as Will MacDonald
- Salome Jens as Esther MacDonald
- Christian Juttner as Benjy MacDonald
- Robert Donner as Trapper Burton
- Denver Pyle as Narrator (Ben MacDonald as an adult)
- Stuart Lee as John MacDonald
- Georgie Collins as Mrs. Martha Gilman

== Production ==
The Boy Who Talked to Badgers was filmed on location in Alberta, Canada.
