= Georgie Collins =

Canadian actress

- Collins in the late 1990s at the Betty Awards
- Born: Eileen Georgina Given; June 12, 1925; Calgary, Alberta, Canada
- Died: May 3, 2017 (aged 91); Calgary, Alberta, Canada
- Education: University of Alberta
- Occupations: Actress; theatre director
- Years active: 1974–2017
- Spouse: Allen Collins (m. 1943)
- Children: 2

Eileen Georgina "Georgie" Collins (née Given; June 12, 1925 – May 3, 2017) was a Canadian film, stage, and television actress. Collins is known for her role in the 1981 cult horror film Ghostkeeper, as well as her roles in the television series Lonesome Dove: The Series (1995) and the Steven Spielberg-produced miniseries Into the West (2005).

Born in Calgary and raised in DeBolt, Alberta, Collins began acting in stage productions in the 1960s before making her feature film debut in The Visitor (1974). Subsequent film credits include The Boy Who Talked to Badgers (1975), Rad (1986), Housekeeping (1988), and How the West Was Fun (1994).

In addition to working in film and television, Collins was a longtime prominent figure in Calgary's theater community, working as a director and actress. She served as the artistic director of the Pleiades Theater from 1976 until 1990.

== Early life ==
Collins was born Eileen Georgina Given on June 12, 1925, in Calgary, Alberta, to George and Elizabeth Given, both Irish immigrants. When she was three years old, the family relocated from Calgary to rural DeBolt, Alberta, where she spent her childhood on a farm. She had three brothers—Robert, Ed, and Wesley—and a sister, Lili.

At age thirteen, Collins was encouraged by a teacher to participate in a speech contest. She stated that she was inspired to become an actress after watching Judy Garland and Mickey Rooney in the film Babes in Arms (1939), which she saw at a local theater in Grande Prairie. As a teenager, Collins resided with a family in Grande Prairie so she could attend high school there, earning room and board by doing housework.

While still a teenager, she married Allen Collins, a soldier from Lethbridge who was stationed in Grande Prairie during World War II. The couple had two children, Allen (1949–1976) and Debi (born 1952).

Collins earned an acting scholarship at the Banff Centre in Banff, Alberta, where she was enrolled in three summer programs. Because of her husband's military career, the couple relocated several times, residing in Athabasca and, later, Edmonton, where she studied drama at the University of Alberta under Elizabeth Sterling Haynes.

== Career ==
=== 1960–1980 ===
In the early 1960s, Collins auditioned for a production of The Chalk Garden in Edmonton, and landed one of the lead female roles. She was further inspired to pursue an acting career after traveling to New York City and Montreal, where she saw Laurence Olivier in a stage production at Place des Arts. By the mid-1960s, Collins had established a theatre career in Calgary, directing and acting in numerous local productions.

She made her film debut in The Visitor (1974), followed by a part in The Wonderful World of Disney two-part television film The Boy Who Talked to Badgers (1975).

=== 1981–2005 ===
In 1981, she appeared in a pivotal role in the horror film Ghostkeeper, which was filmed in Banff in December 1980. In 1986, she had a supporting role in the American sports film Rad.

She would later appear in Gunsmoke: Return to Dodge (1987), and the comedy Housekeeping (1988), opposite Christine Lahti. She also had a minor part in the television film Body of Evidence opposite Margot Kidder, which was filmed in Calgary. She subsequently had a supporting part in the Mary-Kate and Ashley Olsen film How the West Was Fun (1994), and appeared in a six-episode arc of Lonesome Dove: The Series between 1994 and 1995.

In 2000, she made her final film appearance in For All Time, a television drama starring Mark Harmon and Catherine Hicks. In 2005, she appeared in a guest role on the Steven Spielberg-produced series Into the West, which premiered on TNT.

In addition to her work in film and television, Collins was an active member of the Calgary theater community for multiple decades. She served as the artistic director of the Pleiades Theatre from 1976 until 1990. Now the Vertigo Mystery Theatre, it is the only professional theatre company in Canada that produces a full season of mystery plays.

== Honors ==
In 2003, Collins was honored by the Alliance of Canadian Cinema, Television and Radio Artists for being a founding member of ACTRA Calgary.

== Death ==
Collins died in Calgary on May 3, 2017, aged 91.

== Filmography ==
=== Film ===
Year	Title	Role	Notes	Ref.
1974	The Visitor			
1975	The Boy Who Talked to Badgers	Mrs. Gilman	Television film	
1982	Ghostkeeper	Ghostkeeper		
1983	Chautauqua Girl	Maude	Television film	
1986	Rad	Luke's Mom		
1987	Gunsmoke: Return to Dodge	Mrs. Collins	Television film	
1987	Housekeeping	Sylvia Foster		
1988	Body of Evidence	Lady in Hospital	Television film	
1988	Cowboys Don't Cry	Ms. Chapman		
1994	How the West Was Fun	Mrs. Plaskett	Television film	
1994	Strange and Rich	Erica Weiss		
1998	Noah	Dottie	Television film	
2000	A Father's Choice	Dotty	Television film	
2000	For All Time	Mrs. Clark		

=== Television ===
Year	Title	Role	Notes	Ref.
1994–1995	Lonesome Dove: The Series	Mrs. Hackett	6 episodes	
1996	In Cold Blood	Journalist	Miniseries; 2 episodes	
2000	Honey, I Shrunk the Kids: The TV Show	Elderly woman	1 episode	
2005	Into the West	Hannah Wheeler	Miniseries; 1 episode	
