= Christian Juttner =

American actor (1964–2024)

- Born: May 20, 1964; Pomona, California, U.S.
- Died: November 29, 2024 (aged 60); Yucca Valley, California, U.S.
- Occupation: Actor
- Years active: 1971–1980
- Spouse: Ann Juttner (divorced)
- Children: 3

Christian John Juttner (May 20, 1964 – November 29, 2024) was an American film and television actor. He began his career as a child actor and was best known for his roles in the 1978 films Return from Witch Mountain and I Wanna Hold Your Hand.

== Life and career ==
Juttner was born in Pomona, California, on May 20, 1964. While known for his roles in a few Disney films, Juttner also appeared in many television shows throughout the 1970s including Bewitched, Ironside, Emergency!, The Bionic Woman, Wonder Woman, ABC Afterschool Specials, Lou Grant, Trapper John, M.D. and Alice.

He appeared in several other films including Return from Witch Mountain, I Wanna Hold Your Hand and The Swarm.

Juttner and his ex-wife, Ann, had three children. After retiring from acting, Juttner lived in Saint Croix, where he and his father owned a glassworks business. He later started his own glassworks business in Santa Clarita, California. Juttner died at his home in Yucca Valley, California, on November 29, 2024, at the age of 60.

== Filmography ==
Film and television
| Year | Title | Role | Notes |
|---|---|---|---|
| 1971 | Ironside | Eddie | Episode: "Class of '57" |
| 1972 | Bewitched | Robert | Episode: "Samantha's Magic Sitter" |
| 1972 | Emergency! | Frankie Stewart | Episode: "Kids" |
| 1974 | The Healers | Vince Kier | TV movie |
| 1974 | ABC Afterschool Special | Mouse | Episode: "Pssst! Hammerman's After You!" |
| 1974 | The Rookies | Todd Page | Episode: "Legacy of Death" |
| 1974 | Return of the Big Cat | Leroy McClaren | TV movie (2-part movie produced under the NBC Disney anthology series The Wonderful World of Disney |
| 1974 | Ironside | Joey | Episode: "Speak No Evil" |
| 1975 | S.W.A.T. | Billy Farris | Episode: "The Bravo Enigma" |
| 1975 | The Boy Who Talked to Badgers | Benjy MacDonald | TV movie (2-part movie produced under the NBC Disney anthology series The Wonderful World of Disney |
| 1975 | Journey from Darkness | Danny (age 8) | TV movie |
| 1976 | Medical Center | | Episode: "A Touch of Sight" |
| 1976 | The Bionic Woman | Teddy | 4 episodes |
| 1976 | Wonder Woman | Tommy | Episode: "Wonder Woman Meets Baroness Von Gunther" |
| 1976 | Ark II | Ben | Episode: "The Balloon" |
| 1977 | The New Mickey Mouse Club | Chris Hollister | Episode #1.12 |
| 1977 | ABC Afterschool Special | Hollis | Episode: "The Horrible Honchos" |
| 1978 | The Million Dollar Dixie Deliverance | Timmy | TV movie (produced under the NBC Disney anthology series The Wonderful World of Disney |
| 1978 | Return from Witch Mountain | Dazzler | Feature film |
| 1978 | I Wanna Hold Your Hand | Peter Plimpton | Feature film |
| 1978 | The Swarm | Paul Durant | Feature film |
| 1979 | Lou Grant | Michael | Episode: "Romance" |
| 1979 | Trapper John, M.D. | Teenage Boy | Episode: "The Shattered Image" |
| 1980 | Alice | Billy | Episode: "Alice in TV Land" |
| 1980 | The Ghosts of Buxley Hall | Cadet Capt. Hubert Fletcher | TV movie (2-part movie produced under the NBC Disney anthology series Disney's Wonderful World |
| 1981 | General Hospital | Teddy | Episode #4768 |
