= Allan W. Eckert =

American novelist

Allan Wesley Eckert
- Born: January 30, 1931; Buffalo, New York, U.S.
- Died: July 7, 2011 (aged 80); Corona, California, U.S.
- Occupations: Novelist, playwright
- Writing career
- Notable works: Incident at Hawk's Hill (1971); The HAB Theory (1976)
- Notable awards: Newbery Honor (1972)

Allan Wesley Eckert (January 30, 1931 – July 7, 2011) was an American novelist and playwright who specialized in historical novels for adults and children, and was also a naturalist. His novel Incident at Hawk's Hill (1971) was initially marketed to adults and selected by Reader's Digest Condensed Books. A runner-up for the Newbery Medal, it was afterward marketed as a children's novel and adapted by Disney for a television movie known as The Boy Who Talked to Badgers (1975).

Eckert wrote several books of natural history. In addition, he wrote more than 225 episodes of Mutual of Omaha's Wild Kingdom, for which he received an Emmy Award.

His numerous historical novels were popular, including several that were part of his series "The Winning of America". In 1996, one of them was adapted for the stage as 1913: The Great Dayton Flood and premiered at Wright State University, also being produced at the Kennedy Center in Washington, DC. He wrote the drama Tecumseh! for an outdoor production at Sugarloaf Mountain Amphitheatre near Chillicothe, Ohio in 1973.

== Biography ==
Eckert was born in Buffalo, New York, in 1931, and raised in the Chicago, Illinois area. He attended college at the University of Dayton and Ohio State before settling near Bellefontaine, Ohio and remaining a longtime resident there.

As a young man, he hitchhiked around the United States, living off the land and learning about wildlife. He began writing about nature and American history at the age of thirteen. He eventually wrote numerous books for children and adults. His children's novel, Incident at Hawk's Hill, was a runner-up for the Newbery Medal in 1972. One of his novels tells how the great auk became extinct.

Eckert published numerous novels of the Ohio Country frontier in what was called his "The Winning of America" series, including accounts of frontiersmen and notable Native Americans, such as Tecumseh. He conducted extensive research for his works, but inserted fictional dialogue for his historical figures.

Eckert also wrote several unproduced screenplays. He wrote more than 225 episodes of Mutual of Omaha's Wild Kingdom, for which he received an Emmy Award.

In a 1999 poll conducted by the Ohioana Library Association, Eckert shared with Toni Morrison the accolade of "Favorite Ohio Writer of All Time."

Eckert died in his sleep on July 7, 2011, in Corona, California, at the age of 80.

== Dramatizations and adaptations ==
Eckert wrote the outdoor drama Tecumseh! which, in 1997, celebrated its 25th year of production at the multi-million-dollar Sugarloaf Mountain Amphitheater near Chillicothe, Ohio. His 1968 children's novel Blue Jacket was adapted as a drama of the same name designed for outdoor performances. It opened in 1982 at a facility outside Xenia, Ohio. The production eventually closed due to financial difficulties, but it was estimated to have generated more than nine million dollars yearly into the local economy of southwest Ohio.

Eckert's 1965 book A Time of Terror: The Great Dayton Flood was in 1996 adapted for the stage as 1913: The Great Dayton Flood by W. Stuart McDowell and Timothy Nevits. It was performed at Wright State University, featuring recorded narration by actors Martin Sheen, Ossie Davis and Ruby Dee. The production won a number of awards from the American College Theatre Festival XXIX at the Riffe Center, Columbus, Ohio. It opened the 1997 festival in the Kennedy Center, returning to Dayton that fall, where it played in the Victoria Theatre.

== Criticism ==
While Eckert emphasized the historical basis of his books and stressed the years of research he conducted, he created dialogue and internal thought for his ostensibly historic figures. Reviewers have described his work as "an entertaining blend of fact and fiction." What Eckert described as "narrative biography” was criticized by Kirkus Reviews as “an apparent euphemism for poetic license”, when discussing his book about Tecumseh. A Sorrow in Our Heart: The Life of Tecumseh was described as "A biography that succeeds better as fiction". The reviewer said that the book "in its interpretative zeal … strays from … the historical record to the point of being suspect".

== Bibliography ==
- The Great Auk: A Novel (1963); 2003 paperback reprint edition, Jesse Stuart Foundation, ISBN 1-931672-16-4.
- A Time of Terror: The Great Dayton Flood (1965); 1997 reprint edition with an Afterword by W. Stuart McDowell, Landfall Press, ISBN 0-913428-02-7.
- The Silent Sky: The Incredible Extinction of the Passenger Pigeon (1965); 2000 paperback reprint edition, Backinprint.com, ISBN 0-595-08963-1.
- The Writer's Digest Course in Short Story Writing; 1965.
- Wild Season; 1967; 1981 reprint edition, Landfall Press, ISBN 0-913428-32-9 (paperback: ISBN 0-913428-31-0).
- The Frontiersmen: A Narrative (1967); 2001 paperback reprint edition, Jesse Stuart Foundation; ISBN 0-945084-91-9.
- Bayou Backwaters; with Marlin Perkins (1967), 2000 reprint edition, Doubleday, ISBN 0-385-01101-6.
- The Crossbreed; 1968, Little Brown & Company, ISBN 0-316-20851-5; 2000 paperback reprint edition, Backinprint.com, ISBN 0-595-08992-5.
- Blue Jacket: War Chief of the Shawnees; 1968; 2003 reprint edition, Jesse Stuart Foundation, ISBN 1-931672-18-0, (paperback: ISBN 1-931672-20-2).
- The King Snake; (Juvenile natural history) 1968; 1990 reprint, Scholastic, ISBN 0-590-42752-0; 2001 paperback reprint edition, Backinprint.com, ISBN 0-595-18006-X.
- The Dreaming Tree; 1968; 2000 paperback reprint edition, Backinprint.com, ISBN 0-595-08989-5.
- Wilderness Empire: A Narrative;1968; 2001 reprint edition, Jesse Stuart Foundation, ISBN 0-945084-98-6, (paperback: ISBN 1-931672-02-4).
- In Search of a Whale; 1969, Doubleday, ISBN 0-385-03494-6.
- The Conquerors; 1970; 2002 reprint edition, Jesse Stuart Foundation, ISBN 1-931672-06-7, (paperback: ISBN 1-931672-07-5).
- Incident at Hawk's Hill; 1971; 1995 reprint edition, Little Brown & Company, ISBN 0-316-21905-3, (paperback: ISBN 0-316-20948-1).
- The Court-Martial of Daniel Boone; 1973, Little Brown & Company, ISBN 0-316-20870-1; 2000 paperback reprint edition, Backinprint.com, ISBN 0-595-08990-9.
- The Owls of North America, North of Mexico: All the Species and Subspecies Illustrated in Color and Fully Described; 1973, Doubleday Books, ISBN 0-385-04818-1.
- Tecumseh!: A Play; 1975; 2000 paperback reprint edition, Backinprint.com, ISBN 0-595-08964-X.
- The HAB Theory; 1976, Little Brown & Company, ISBN 0-316-20859-0; 2000 paperback reprint edition, Backinprint.com, ISBN 0-595-00820-8.
- The Wilderness War, A Narrative; 1978; 2003 reprint edition, Jesse Stuart Foundation, ISBN 1-931672-13-X, (paperback: ISBN 1-931672-14-8).
- The Wading Birds of North America: North of Mexico; 1978; 1987 reprint edition, Gramercy, ISBN 0-517-63229-2.
- Savage Journey: A Novel"; (Juvenile literature); 1979, Little Brown & Company, ISBN 0-316-20876-0; 2001 paperback reprint edition, Backinprint.com, ISBN 0-595-18171-6.
- Song of the Wild; (Juvenile literature); 1980, Little Brown & Co., ISBN 0-316-20877-9; 2000 paperback reprint edition, Backinprint.com, ISBN 0-595-08991-7.
- Whattizzit Nature Pun Quizzes; (booklet) 1981, Landfall Press, ISBN 0-913428-30-2.
- Gateway to Empire; 1982, Little Brown & Company, ISBN 0-316-20861-2; 1983 paperback edition, Bantam Books, ISBN 0-553-24118-4.
- Johnny Logan: Shawnee Spy: A Novel; 1982, Little Brown & Co, ISBN 0-316-20880-9; 2001 Paperback reprint edition, Backinprint.Com, ISBN 0-595-16763-2.
- Wilderness Empire, Number 2; 1982, Bantam Books, ISBN 0-553-22651-7.
- The Dark Green Tunnel; (Juvenile fantasy); 1983, Little Brown & Co., ISBN 0-316-20881-7; 2000 paperback reprint edition, Backinprint.com, ISBN 0-595-08962-3.
- The Wand: The Return to Mesmeria; (Juvenile fantasy) 1984, Little Brown & Co, ISBN 0-316-20882-5; 2001 paperback reprint edition, Backinprint.com, ISBN 0-595-18325-5.
- The Scarlet Mansion; 1985, Little Brown & Company, ISBN 0-316-20883-3; 2000 paperback reprint edition, Backinprint.com, ISBN 0-595-08988-7.
- Earth Treasures Volume 1: the Northeastern Quadrant; 1985; 2000 paperback reprint edition, Backinprint.com, ISBN 0-595-08958-5.
- Earth Treasures Volume 2: the Southeastern Quadrant; 1985; 2000 paperback reprint edition, Backinprint.com, ISBN 0-595-08959-3.
- Earth Treasures Volume 3: the Northwestern Quadrant; 1986; 2000 paperback reprint edition, Backinprint.com, ISBN 0-595-08960-7.
- Earth Treasures Volume 4A: the Southwestern Quadrant; 1987; 2000 paperback reprint edition, Backinprint.com, ISBN 0-595-08961-5.
- Twilight Of Empire; 1988, Little Brown & Company, ISBN 0-316-20886-8; 1989 paperback reprint edition, Bantam, ISBN 0-553-28059-7.
- A Sorrow in Our Heart: The Life of Tecumseh; 1992, Bantam Books, ISBN 0-553-08023-7; 1993 paperback reprint, Domain, ISBN 0-553-56174-X; 1995 paperback reprint, Smithmark Publishing, ISBN 0-8317-5817-1.
- That Dark and Bloody River: Chronicles of the Ohio River Valley; 1995, Bantam Books, ISBN 0-553-09448-3, (paperback ISBN 0-553-37865-1).
- The World of Opals; 1997, John Wiley & Sons, ISBN 0-471-13397-3.
- Return to Hawk's Hill; 1998, Little Brown & Company, ISBN 0-316-21593-7, (paperback: ISBN 0-316-00689-0).
- Dark Journey: The Tragedy of the Donner Party; 2009, Jesse Stuart Foundation, ISBN 978-1-931672-53-5
