= 163rd Military Intelligence Battalion (United States) =

163rd Language Detachment 163rd Military Intelligence Platoon 163rd Military Intelligence Battalion
- 163 MIBN
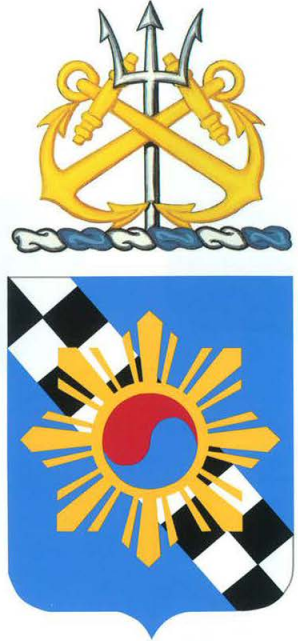
- Active: 1945–1954; 1955–1964; 1969–1997; 2006 – present
- Country: United States of America
- Branch: United States Army: Military Intelligence Corps
- Type: Military Intelligence Gathering and Exploitation
- Role: Military Intelligence exploitation
- Size: Battalion
- Part of: 504th Military Intelligence Brigade
- Garrison/HQ: Fort Hood, Texas
- Nickname: "The Blue Watch"
- Motto: "Knowledge is Power!"
- Engagements: World War II; Korean War

Insignia
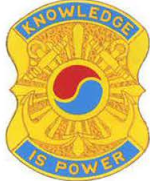
- Identification symbol

The 163rd Military Intelligence Battalion is a military intelligence battalion of the United States Army based at Fort Hood under the 504th Military Intelligence Brigade (Expeditionary) supporting III Corps.

== Lineage ==
- Constituted 5 April 1945 in the Army of the United States as the 163rd Language Department
  - Activated 23 April 1945 in the Philippine Islands
  - Re-organised and re-designated 25 September 1949 as the 163rd Military Intelligence Service Detachment
  - Allotted 19 December 1950 to the Regular Army and re-designated as the 163rd Military Intelligence Service Platoon
  - Re-organised and re-designated 28 March 1954 as the 163rd Military Intelligence Platoon
  - Inactivated 15 November 1954 in South Korea
- Activated 26 December 1955 in Italy
  - Re-organised and re-designated 20 September 1957 as the 163rd Military Intelligence Battalion
  - Inactivated 25 April 1964 in Italy
- Activated at Fort Hood, Texas (A Company re-organised and re-designated 21 April 1978 as B Company, 529th Military Intelligence Company [see ANNEX] concurrently re-organised and re-designated as A Company)
  - Battalion inactivated 15 September 1997 at Fort Hood, Texas
- Activated 16 January 2006 at Fort Hood, Texas

ANNEX

- Constituted 14 July 1945 in the Army of the United States as the 225th (Independent) Prisoner of War Team and activated in West Germany
  - Inactivated 30 November 1946 in West Germany
  - Re-designated 1 October 1948 as the 529th Interrogation Team and allotted to the Regular Army
- Activated 15 October 1948 at Fort Riley, Kansas
  - Inactivated 10 February 1949 at Fort Riley, Kansas
  - Re-designated 17 March 1965 as the 529th Military Intelligence Company
- Activated 19 March 1965 at Fort Hood, Texas

== Honours ==
Campaign Participation Credit

- World War II: Luzon
- Korean War: UN Defensive, UN Offensive, CCF Intervention, First UN Counteroffensive, CCF Spring Offensive, UN Summer-Fall Offensive, Second Korean Winter, Korea Summer-Fall 1952, Third Korean Winter, Korean Summer 1953

Decorations

- Presidential Unit Citation (Navy) for INCHON
- Presidential Unit Citation (Navy) for HWACHON RESERVOIR
- Navy Unit Commendation for PANMUNJOM
- Philippine Presidential Unit Citation for 17 October 1944 TO 4 July 1945
- Republic of Korea Presidential Unit Citation for KOREA 1950–1953

== Heraldic items ==
Coat of Arms

- The two crossed anchors allude to the two Presidential Unit Citations (Navy) and the trident refers to the Navy Unit Commendation.
- Shield: Azure on a bend, chequy argent and sable, overall a Philippine sun charged with a Korean taeguk in the colours of the Republic of Korea, scarlet and blue.
- Crest: On a wreath of the colours, argent and azure, a trident argent interlaced with two anchors in saltire or.
- Motto: "KNOWLEDGE IS POWER"
- Symbolism: The sun alludes to service in the Philippines during World War II and to the Philippine Presidential Unit Citation. The taeguk symbolises the Republic of Korea Presidential Unit Citation and the unit's ten campaigns in the Korean War. The black and white chequy alludes to the intelligence functions of the organisation. Oriental blue and silver gray are the colours used by intelligence units.

Distinctive Unit Insignia

- The distinctive unit insignia consists of elements of the shield, crest, and mottos of the coat of arms.
