= Body of Evidence (1988 film) =

- Promotional poster
- Genre: Drama; Thriller
- Written by: Cynthia Whitcomb
- Directed by: Roy Campanella II
- Starring: Margot Kidder; Barry Bostwick; Tony Lo Bianco
- Music by: Roy Campanella II
- Country of origin: United States
- Original language: English

Production
- Producer: Cynthia Whitcomb
- Production locations: Alberta, Canada
- Cinematography: Frank Beascoechea
- Editor: Ray Daniels
- Running time: 108 minutes
- Production company: CBS Entertainment Production

Original release
- Network: CBS
- Release: January 22, 1988

Body of Evidence is a psychological thriller film directed by Roy Campanella II starring Margot Kidder and Barry Bostwick. It premiered on CBS Network on January 22, 1988. It was filmed in Alberta, Canada.

== Premise ==
An unsuspecting nurse fears her forensic pathologist second-husband may be the psychotic serial strangler behind a recent rash of grisly murders. A local police detective does his best to unravel clues that may prevent future killings.

== Plot ==
A serial killer, killing young girls by garroting them with a wire noose, is running amok, their motive unknown. Through examinations of the victims' bodies, the pathologist involved in most of the murder investigations discovers a number of clues: the murderer is Afro-American, left-handed and sterile. The pathologist's wife, Carol, a nurse, organizes a neighborhood watch protection group in reaction to the murders.

The police detective's investigation into the murders is full of roadblocks. Every new finding seems to contradict the last: as the list of victims grows, the composite sketch changes with each new witness, and it seems as though the killer is able to stay one step ahead of the detective's investigation.

As the intensity of the killing grows, the need to catch the killer becomes increasingly important. Carol - who is working closely with the police - finds reasons to fear for her own safety. All the victims resemble her, and the clues appear to point to her second husband, the forensic police pathologist involved in the investigation whose increasingly bizarre behaviour implicates him further.

== Cast ==
- Margot Kidder as Carol Dwyer
- Barry Bostwick as Alex Dwyer
- Caroline Kava as Jean
- Jennifer Barbour as Jessie
- David Hayward as Jack
- Tony Lo Bianco as Evan Campbell
- Debbie Carr as Lisa
- Peter Bibby as Intern
- Garwin Sanford as Doctor
- Georgie Collins as Lady In Hospital
- Don S. Davis as Gun Salesman
- Blu Mankuma as Sawyer
- Don MacKay as J.P.
- Bill Croft as Construction Man #1
- Karen Tilly as Stephanie
