= James Makichuk =

Canadian screenwriter

James Makichuk (born September 25, 1946) is a Canadian screenwriter and director. His directorial feature debut was the 1981 supernatural horror film Ghostkeeper.

== Biography ==
Makichuck was born in 1946 in Swan River, Manitoba, Canada. He is of Ukrainian descent. Makichuk was raised in Windsor, Ontario, and graduated from F. J. Brennan Catholic High School.

Makichuk began his career working in television for CKLW-TV in 1969, later working for the studio as an editor and newswriter. In 1973, he began working for Global Television Network in Toronto before relocating to Alberta, where he enrolled in a film course at the Banff School of the Arts. After moving to Calgary, Makuchuk formed Badland Pictures in 1979, through which he produced his directorial feature debut, the horror film Ghostkeeper (1981), filmed in Lake Louise, Alberta in late 1980. He later co-wrote the horror film Blood Games (1990).

== Filmography ==
Year	Title	Director	Writer	Notes	Ref.
1981	Ghostkeeper	Yes	Yes		
1985	The Tower	Yes	Yes		
1986	Heathcliff: The Movie	No	Yes		
1987	Niagara Strip	Yes	Yes		
1988	Betrayal of Silence	No	Yes		
1988	Betrayal of Silence	No	Yes		
1990	Blood Games	No	Yes		
1998	Dream House	No	Yes	Television film	
1999	Roswell: The Aliens Attack	No	Yes	Television film	
2001	Rough Air: Danger on Flight 534	No	Yes	Television film	
2002	Gentle Ben	No	Yes	Television film	
2002	Greenmail	No	Yes		
2004	Target	No	Yes		
2004	Maiden Voyage	No	Yes	Television film	
2010	The Town Christmas Forgot	No	Yes	Television film	
