= 38th Wing =

38th Wing or 38 Wing may refer to:

- No. 38 Wing RAF, a unit of the United Kingdom Royal Air Force
- 38th Combat Support Wing, formerly 38th Engineering Installation Wing, a unit of the United States Air Force
- 38th Bombardment Wing, a unit of the United States Air Force
- 38th Tactical Missile Wing, a unit of the United States Air Force

== See also ==
- 38th Division (disambiguation)
- 38th Brigade (disambiguation)
- 38th Regiment (disambiguation)
- 38 Squadron (disambiguation)
