= 38 =

38 may refer to:

- 38 (number), the natural number following 37 and preceding 39
- 38 BC
- AD 38
- 1938
- 2038

== Science ==
- Strontium, an alkaline earth metal in the periodic table
- 38 Leda, an asteroid in the asteroid belt

== Other uses ==
- .38, a caliber of firearms and cartridges
  - .38 Special, a revolver cartridge
- Thirty-Eight: The Hurricane That Transformed New England, a 2016 book by Stephen Long
- "Thirty Eight", a song by Karma to Burn from the album Almost Heathen, 2001

== See also ==
- 38th (disambiguation)
