= .38 caliber =

Firearm Cartridge List

.38 caliber is a frequently used name for the caliber of firearms and firearm cartridges.

The .38 caliber is a large firearm cartridge (anything larger than .32 caliber is considered a large caliber). Before 1990, the standard sidearms of law enforcement agencies in the United States were revolvers that fired the .38 Special cartridge, seconded by revolvers firing the .357 Magnum, a lengthened version of the .38 Special.

== Handgun cartridge table ==
| Cartridge name | Bullet diameter | Case length | Cartridge length | Type | Source |
|---|---|---|---|---|---|
| .380 ACP | .355 in (9.0 mm) | .680 in (17.3 mm) | .980 in (24.9 mm) | Rimless | Barnes 1997, p. 274 |
| .38 Casull | .356 in (9.0 mm) | .933 in (23.7 mm) | – | Rimless | |
| .38 Short Colt | .357 in (9.1 mm) | .762 in (19.4 mm) | 1.052 in (26.7 mm) | Rimmed | Barnes 1997, p. 274 |
| .38 Long Colt | .357 in (9.1 mm) | 1.030 in (26.2 mm) | 1.320 in (33.5 mm) | Rimmed | Barnes 1997, p. 274 |
| .38 Special | .357 in (9.1 mm) | 1.15 in (29 mm) | 1.550 in (39.4 mm) | Rimmed | Barnes 1997, p. 274 |
| .38 ACP | .358 in (9.1 mm) | .900 in (22.9 mm) | 1.280 in (32.5 mm) | Semi-rimmed | Barnes 1997, p. 274 |
| .38 Super | .358 in (9.1 mm) | .900 in (22.9 mm) | 1.280 in (32.5 mm) | Semi-rimmed | Barnes 1997, p. 274 |
| .38 Super Comp | .355 in (9.0 mm) | .896 in (22.8 mm) | 1.280 in (32.5 mm) | Rimless | Starline cartridge dimensions |
| .38 S&W | .361 in (9.2 mm) | .780 in (19.8 mm) | 1.200 in (30.5 mm) | Rimmed | Barnes 1997, p. 274 |
| .38 TPC | .355 in (9.0 mm) | .720 in (18.3 mm) | 1.169 in (29.7 mm) | Rimless, tapered | |
| .380 Revolver Short | .375 in (9.5 mm) | 0.700 in (17.8 mm) | 1.100 in (27.9 mm) | Rimmed | Barnes 1997, p. 274 |
| .380 Revolver Long | .375 in (9.5 mm) | 1.000 in (25.4 mm) | 1.400 in (35.6 mm) | Rimmed | Barnes 1997, p. 274 |
| .38-40 Winchester | .401 in (10.2 mm) | 1.300 in (33.0 mm) | 1.590 in (40.4 mm) | Rimmed | Barnes 1997, p. 92 |

== See also ==
- 9 mm caliber
- 38 (disambiguation)
