= Thirty-Eight: The Hurricane That Transformed New England =

- Author: Stephen Long
- Language: English
- Genre: Nonfiction
- Published: 2016 (Yale University Press)
- Publication place: United States
- ISBN: 978-0300209518

Thirty-Eight: The Hurricane That Transformed New England is a 2016 book by Stephen Long that is an account of the 1938 New England hurricane and its impact on New England. The book focuses on the impact the hurricane had on New England's forests and environment, containing both first-person narratives and quantitative data. Thirty-Eight was first published by Yale University Press.

== Author ==
Stephen Long is an American forester, writer, author, natural historian, and co-founder of the magazine Northern Woodlands. Long is also a former playwright and former film reviewer.

== Background ==
The 1938 New England Hurricane (also referred to as the Great New England Hurricane, Long Island Express, and Yankee Clipper) was one of the deadliest and most destructive tropical cyclones to strike Long Island, New York, and New England. The storm formed near the coast of Africa on September 9, becoming a Category 5 hurricane on the Saffir-Simpson Hurricane Scale, before making landfall as a Category 3 hurricane on Long Island on September 21. It is estimated that the hurricane killed 682 people, damaged or destroyed more than 57,000 homes, and caused property losses estimated at $306 million ($4.7 billion in 2017). Damaged trees and buildings were still seen in the affected areas as late as 1951. It remains the most powerful and deadliest hurricane in recorded New England history, perhaps eclipsed in landfall intensity only by the Great Colonial Hurricane of 1635.

== Reception ==
Thirty-Eight has received reviews from publications including The Washington Times, Environmental History, The Historian, The Boston Globe, and The New York Times.
