= 38th Regiment =

38th Regiment or 38th Infantry Regiment may refer to:

== Infantry regiments ==
- 38th Dogras, a unit of the British Indian Army
- 38th (1st Staffordshire) Regiment of Foot, a unit of the British Army
- 38th Infantry Regiment (United States), a unit of the United States Army
- 38th Infantry Regiment "Neagoe Basarab", a unit of the Royal Romanian Army

== Cavalry regiments ==
- 38th Regiment Central India Horse, a unit of the British Indian Army
- 38th Cavalry Regiment, a unit of the United States Army

== American Civil War regiments ==
- 38th Illinois Infantry Regiment, a unit of the Union (Northern) Army
- 38th Indiana Infantry Regiment, a unit of the Union (Northern) Army
- 38th Iowa Infantry Regiment, a unit of the Union (Northern) Army
- 38th Massachusetts Infantry Regiment, a unit of the Union (Northern) Army
- 38th Ohio Infantry Regiment, a unit of the Union (Northern) Army
- 38th Wisconsin Infantry Regiment, a unit of the Union (Northern) Army
- 38th United States Colored Infantry Regiment, a unit of the Union (Northern) Army
- 38th Alabama Infantry Regiment, a unit of the Confederate (Southern) Army
- 38th Tennessee Infantry Regiment, a unit of the Confederate (Southern) Army
- 38th Virginia Infantry, a unit of the Confederate (Southern) Army

== Other regiments ==
- 38 (City of Sheffield) Signal Regiment, a unit of the British Army
- 38th Field Artillery Regiment, a unit of the United States Army
- 38th Field Regiment, a unit of the New Zealand Army

== See also ==
- 38th Division (disambiguation)
- 38th Brigade (disambiguation)
- 38 Squadron (disambiguation)
- 38th Wing (disambiguation)
