= Chortle =

British comedy website

- Website type: Online comedy magazine
- Available in: English
- Creator: Steve Bennett
- Website: chortle.co.uk
- Commercial: Yes
- Registration: No
- Launched: 2000; 26 years ago
- Current status: Active

Chortle is a British comedy website launched in 2000 by Steve Bennett. The site is a major source of comedy news in the UK. It also reviews live comedy shows nationwide, including extensively at the annual Edinburgh Festival Fringe, and presents the Chortle Awards to honour the best stand-up comics working in the UK. In recent years, the site has also branched out into events promotion.

== History ==
Prior to starting Chortle, Bennett, who graduated from Oxford University, had been working as a local newspaper editor for the Informer group of free newspapers in Surrey and West London. He started the site after the newspaper group expressed a lack of interest in running a website. After considering his areas of interest, he decided to start a comedy site, since IMDb and Empire already covered the market for film, and there were numerous music websites available.

The site received some early support from investors during the dot com boom which led to Bennett working from offices in Brick Lane, London. After that company went bankrupt, Bennett continued the site, as he felt the comedy section of Time Out was not covering the breadth of comedy in the city in sufficient detail. However, the site was not financially viable for several years afterwards, so Bennett worked as a freelance for the Daily Mirror and Mail on Sunday to support himself.

The Chortle Awards were launched in 2002 and in 2014 Chortle launched a comedy literary festival with talks by Monty Python's Terry Jones, and comedy actor Rebecca Front.

Although initially operated by Bennett alone, the site grew into "a proper online publication" with a team of writers including Jay Richardson, Julia Chamberlain and Paul Fleckney, as well as guest contributions from individual comedians.

== Public perception ==
The site is seen as a "one-stop shop for breaking news, reviews and opinion" and is considered to offer some of the "more balanced reviews" of the annual Edinburgh Fringe. It has been said that for comedians, "a positive write-up from Chortle (particularly from editor Steve Bennett), is the holy grail of the Fringe." Satirical website FringePig called it "the conservative majority of the industry; far more people read it than will freely admit".

== See also ==
- British Comedy Guide (TV, Radio, and podcast comedy in the UK)
