= 38th Street =

38th Street may refer to:

== Places in the United States ==
- Phoenix, Arizona
  - 38th Street/Washington station
- Minneapolis, Minnesota
  - 38th Street (Minneapolis)
  - 38th Street (Metro Transit station)
- New York City, New York
  - 38th Street (IRT Sixth Avenue Line)
  - 38th Street (Manhattan)

== Organizations ==
- 38th Street gang, organization based in the U.S. state of California
