= 38th Field Regiment (New Zealand) =

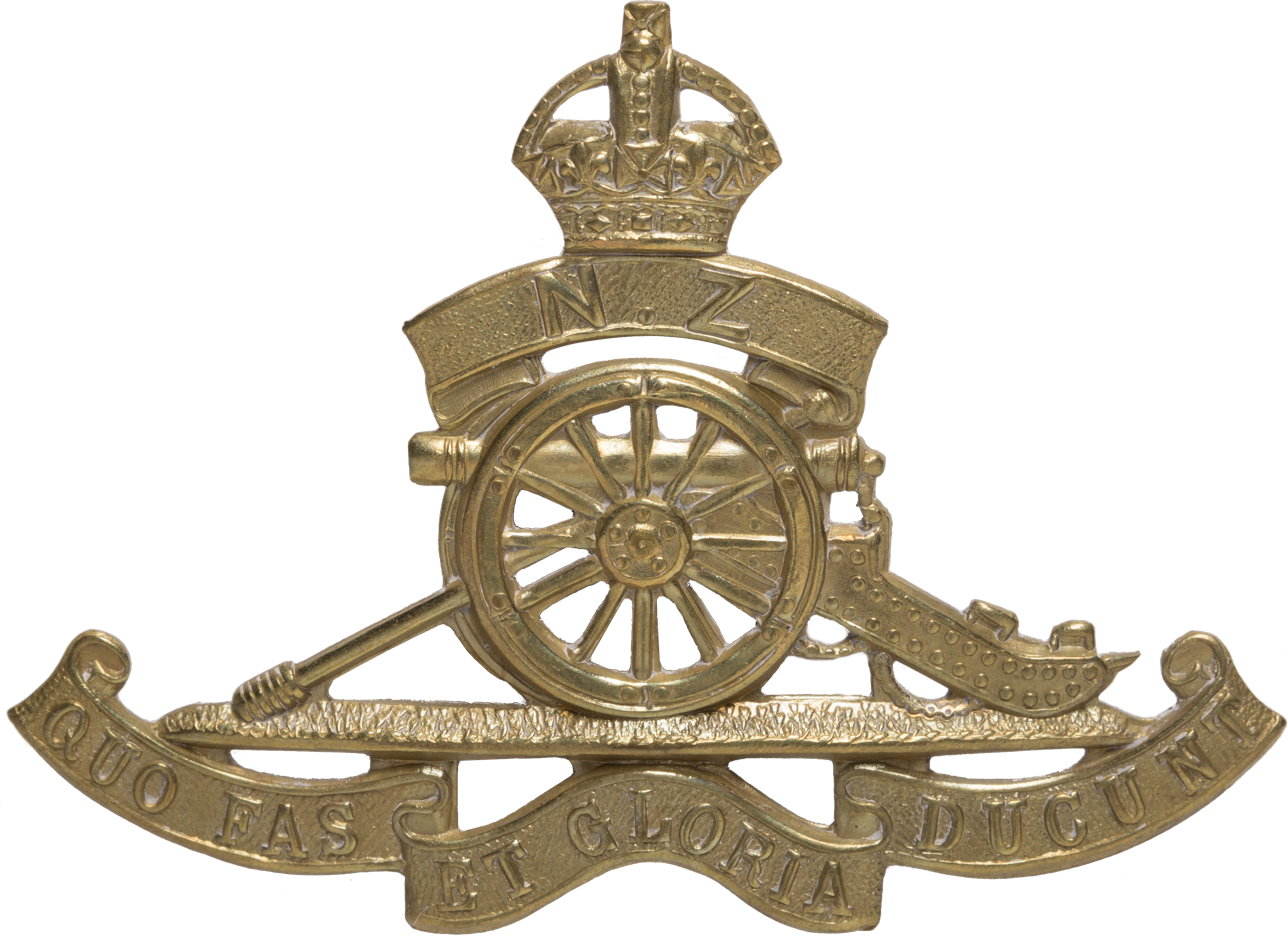
- Cap badge of the New Zealand Artillery
- Active: 1942–1944
- Country: New Zealand
- Branch: New Zealand Military Forces
- Type: Artillery
- Part of: 3rd New Zealand Division
- Engagements: Second World War: Battle of the Treasury Islands

The 38th Field Regiment was an artillery regiment of the New Zealand Military Forces raised during the Second World War. The regiment was formed on 12 April 1943 at Papakura Military Camp and consisted of 49, 50 and 52 Batteries. The regiment departed New Zealand in eight different ships between May and July and continued training in New Caledonia. From late October till November 1943 it took part in the Battle of the Treasury Islands as part of the 8th Brigade Group. From April 1944, 38th Field Regiment began to have men transferred to other units or returned home to work in essential industries due to a manpower shortage. The regiment had been reduced to 48 men by August and the entire 3rd Division was formally disbanded in October 1944.
