= 38th Expeditionary Airlift Squadron =

38th Expeditionary Airlift Squadron

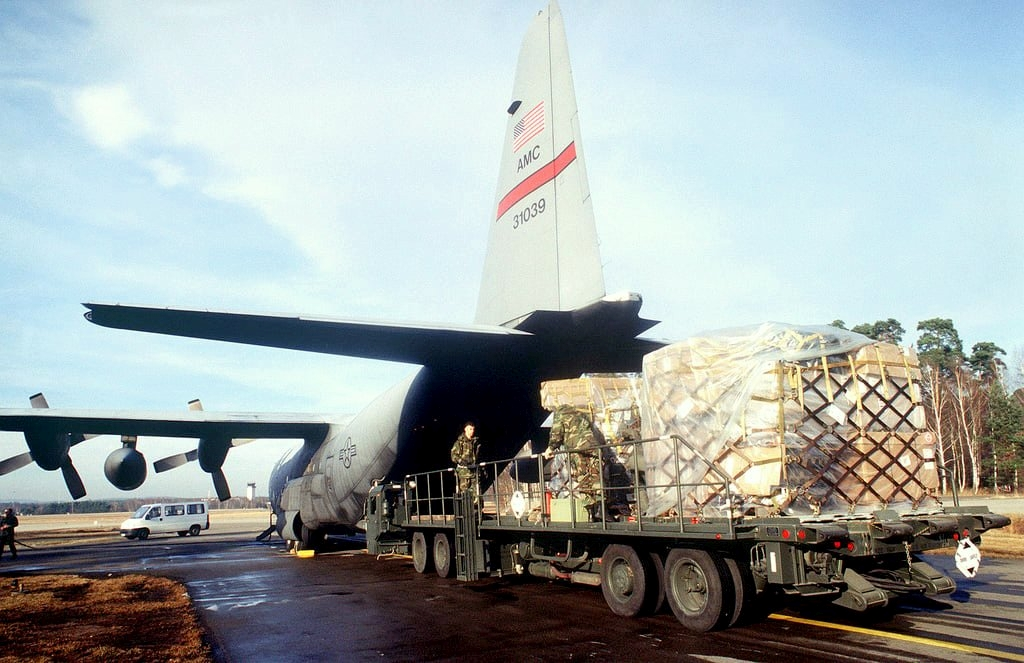
- 38th Air Expeditionary Squadron (P) C-130H Hercules at Ramstein Air Base uploading cargo bound for Tuzla, Bosnia-Herzegovina supporting SFOR and Operation JOINT GUARD
- Active: 1942–1944; 1967–1975; 1994–2010
- Country: United States
- Branch: United States Air Force
- Role: Airlift
- Part of: United States Air Forces in Europe
- Nickname: Delta Squadron (1994-2010)
- Motto: Vincit Qui Primum Gerit: Latin He Conquers Who Gets There First
- Engagements: Vietnam War; Operation Provide Promise; Operation Joint Endeavor; Operation Allied Force; Operation Shining Hope; Operation Joint Guard; Operation Joint Forge
- Decorations: Air Force Outstanding Unit Award with Combat "V" Device; Air Force outstanding Unit Award; Republic of Vietnam Gallantry Cross with Palm

Insignia
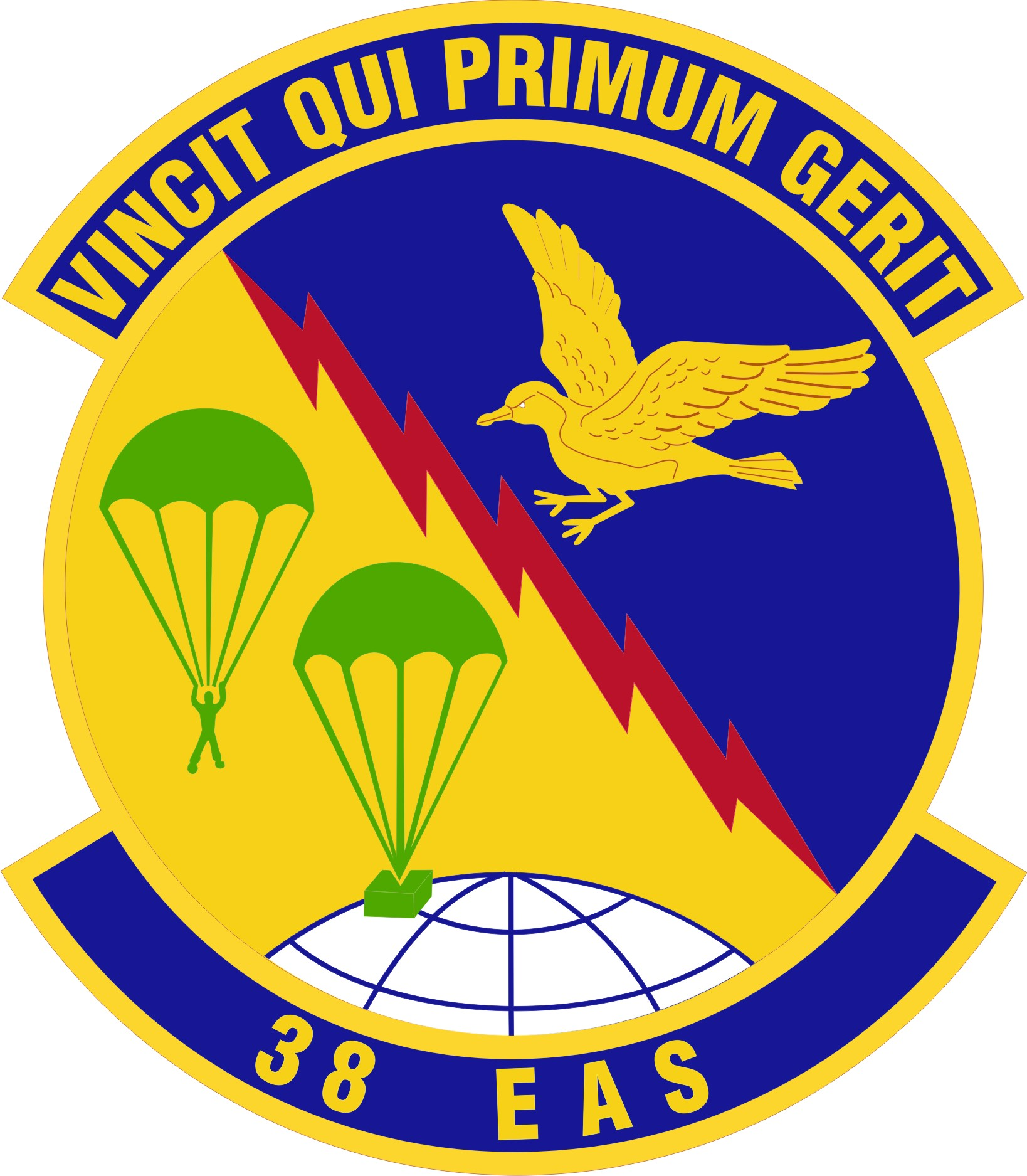
- 38th Expeditionary Airlift Squadron emblem (Modified 3 Sept 2002)

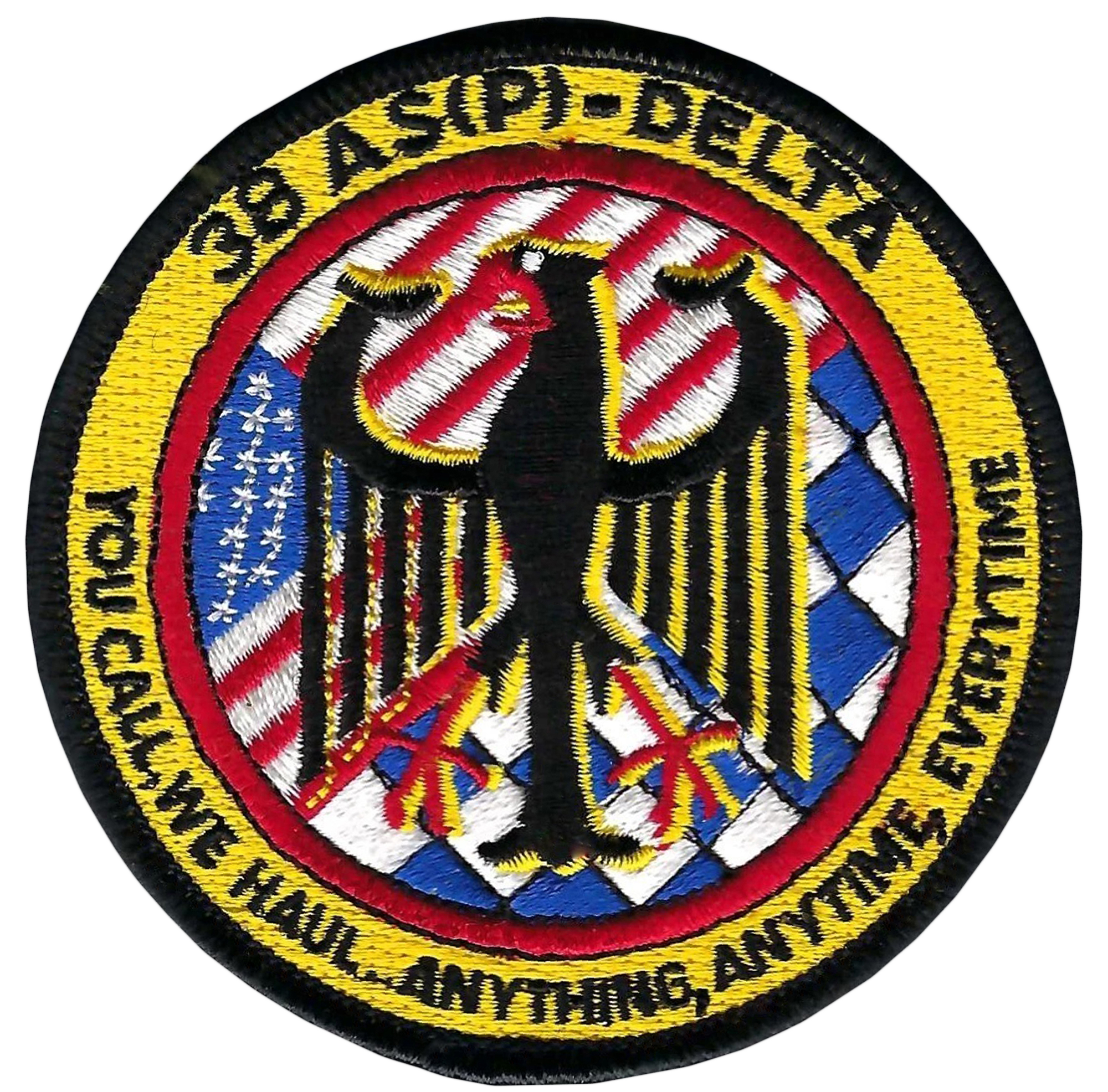
- 38th Air Expeditionary Squadron (P) Delta Squadron emblem (1994-2002)

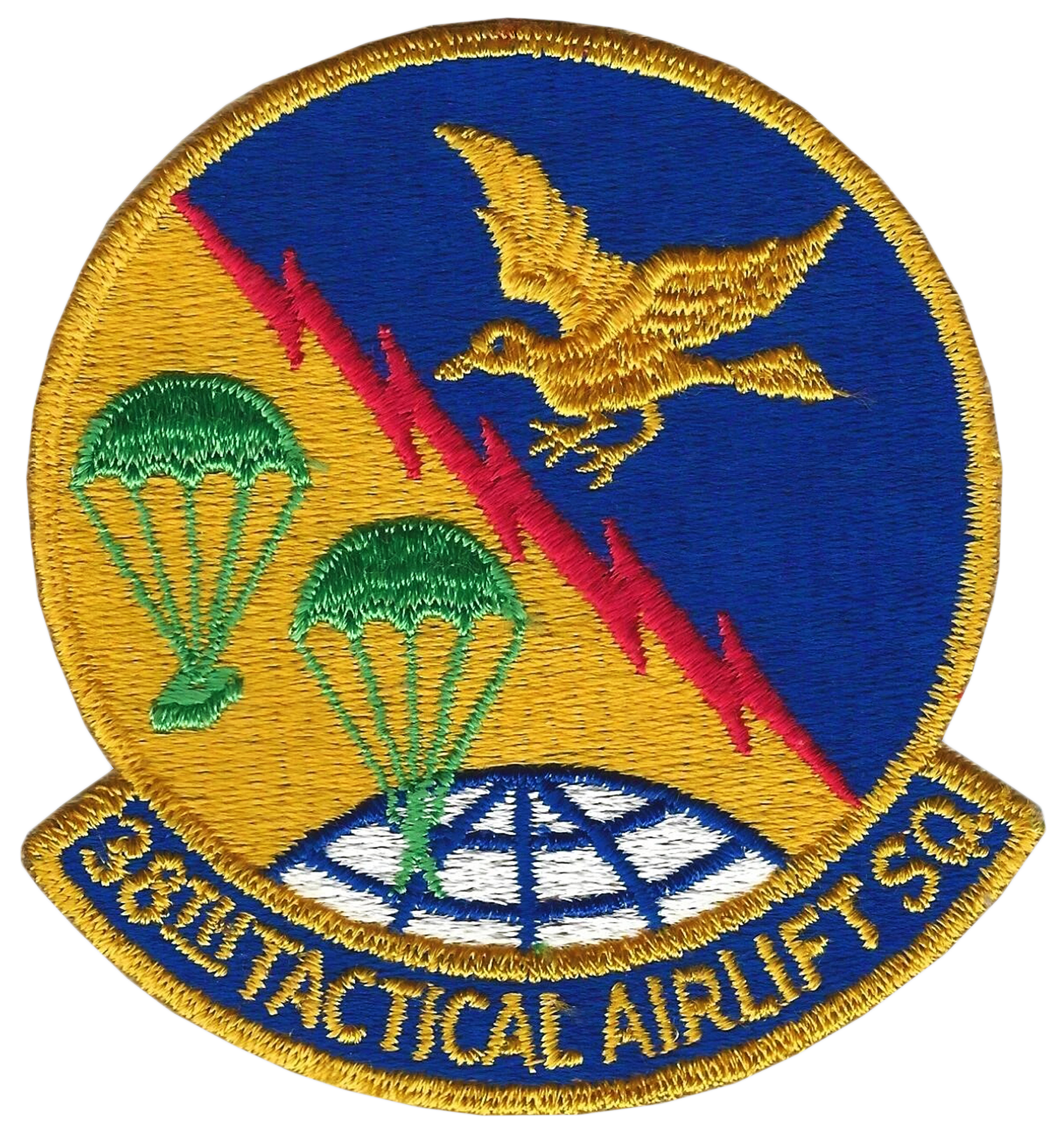
- 38th Tactical Airlift Squadron emblem (Approved 9 Aug 1967)

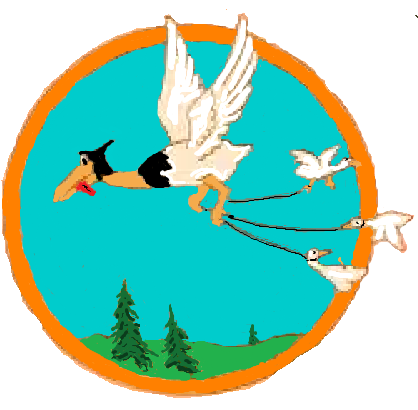
- 38th Troop Carrier Squadron emblem (Approved 13 Jan 1943)

The 38th Expeditionary Airlift Squadron is a provisional United States Air Force unit. Its last assignment was with the 86th Operations Group at Ramstein Air Base, Germany, where it was inactivated on 15 September 2010.

== History ==
=== World War II ===
The 38th Troop Carrier Squadron was activated at Patterson Field, Ohio as one of the original squadrons of the 316th Transport Group in early 1942. It was reassigned to the 10th Troop Carrier Group in 1943 and served as a training unit until it was disbanded in 1944. The squadron was operational training unit, from October 1942 until April 1943 it participated in the ferrying of gliders From June through August 1943 it participated in experimental glider operations. It later served as a replacement training for glider crews and participated in maneuvers.

=== Cold War/Vietnam ===
The squadron was reconstituted supporting the escalating Cold War and Southeast Asia operations in 1966 and served as a C-130 Hercules tactical airlift unit from 1967 until 1975.

=== 1994 – 2010 ===
Converted to provisional status and redesignated as 38th Air Expeditionary Squadron (P) "Delta Squadron" from 1994-2002, a Rhein-Main Air Base then Ramstein Air Base based rotational unit, composed of C-130 Hercules crews and aircraft from active-duty, Reserve, and Air National Guard units supporting 86th Airlift Wing tactical airlift efforts in Operation Provide Promise, Operation Joint Endeavor, Operation Allied Force, Operation Shining Hope, Operation Joint Guard and Operation Joint Forge. Later the unit was redesignated as the 38th Expeditionary Airlift Squadron and assigned to United States Air Forces Europe to activate or inactivate as needed. Activated at Ramstein Air Base, Germany from 2008 until 2010 providing USAFE, U.S. European Command and AFRICOM airlift. The 38th EAS was formally inactivated on 15 September 2010.

== Lineage ==
- Constituted as the 38th Transport Squadron on 2 February 1942

Activated on 14 February 1942
Redesignated 38th Troop Carrier Squadron on 4 July 1942
Disbanded on 14 April 1944

- Reconstituted and activated 8 August 1966 (not organized)

Organized on 1 January 1967
Redesignated 38th Tactical Airlift Squadron on 1 May 1967
Inactivated on 31 August 1975

- Converted to provisional status and redesignated 38th Air Expeditionary Squadron (P) "Delta Squadron" Jan 1994
- Redesignated 38th Expeditionary Airlift Squadron on 3 September 2002

Activated on 27 June 2008
Inactivated on 15 September 2010

=== Assignments ===
- 316th Transport Group (later 316th Troop Carrier Group), 14 February 1942
- 10th Troop Carrier Group, 19 May 1943 – 14 April 1944
- 316th Troop Carrier Wing (later 316th Tactical Airlift Wing), 1 January 1967 (attached to 315th Air Division 8 February 1968 – 19 July 1968)
- 313th Tactical Airlift Wing, 1 July 1969 (attached to 513th Tactical Airlift Wing 5 November 1970 – 7 January 1971, 13 September 1971 – 16 November 1971)
- 316th Tactical Airlift Wing, 15 November 1971 – 31 August 1975 (attached to 513th Tactical Airlift Wing 11 March 1972 – 6 May 1972, 374th Tactical Airlift Wing 31 August 1972 – 29 November 1972, 513th Tactical Airlift Wing 7 May 1973 – 15 July 1973, unknown 29 August 1973 – 3 October 1973, 322d Tactical Airlift Wing 16 December 1974 – 15 February 1975)
- 435th Operations Group, Jan 1994 – Oct 1994
- 86th Airlift Wing, Oct 1994 – Sept 2002
- U.S. Air Forces Europe, to activate or inactivate as needed 3 September 2002. Attached to 86th Operations Group, 27 June 2008 – 15 September 2010

=== Stations ===
- Patterson Field, Ohio, 14 February 1942
- Stout Field, Indiana, 30 May 1942
- Sedalia Army Air Field, Missouri, 3 December 1942
- Bowman Field, Kentucky, 5 April 1943
- Laurinburg-Maxton Army Air Base, North Carolina, 21 June 1943
- Camp Mackall, North Carolina, 10 September 1943
- Laurinburg-Maxton Army Air Base, North Carolina, 17 January – 14 April 1944
- Langley Air Force Base, Virginia, 1 July 1967
- Forbes Air Force Base, Kansas 1 July 1969
- Langley Air Force Base, Virginia 15 November 1971 – 31 August 1975
- Rhein-Main Air Base, Germany Jan 1994 – Oct 1994
- Ramstein Air Base, Germany Oct 1994 – 15 September 2010

=== Aircraft ===
- Douglas C-47 Skytrain, 1942–1944
- Lockheed C-130 Hercules, 1967–1975, 1994–2010

=== Service streamer ===
Service Streamer	Campaign	Dates	Notes
	American Theater without inscription	14 February 1942 – 14 April 1944	38th Troop Carrier Squadron
