= Southern Dobruja Offensive =

Military conflict that took place during the Second Balkan War

- Part of the Second Balkan War
- Southern Dobruja in dark brown
Date	10–18 July 1913
Location	Southern Dobruja and Varna, Bulgaria
Result	Romanian victory

Belligerents
Romania	Bulgaria

Commanders and leaders
Ioan Culcer; Ion Antonescu	None

Units involved
5th Corps	None

Strength
80,000	

Casualties and losses
1,600 dead due to cholera	1 brigade captured

The Southern Dobruja Offensive was the opening action of the Romanian invasion of Bulgaria during the Second Balkan War of 1913. At the time of the invasion, the Bulgarian Army was engaged in heavy fighting against Serbia and Greece. Aside from Southern Dobruja itself, Varna was also briefly occupied by Romanian cavalry, until it became apparent that no Bulgarian resistance would be offered. Southern Dobruja was subsequently annexed by Romania.

== Background ==
The Romanian Army had seen no foreign action since 1878, but on 5 July 1913, it began to mobilize against Bulgaria. Following the beginning of the Second Balkan War, the Romanians perceived an opportunity to accomplish their unfulfilled aspirations in Dobruja. Romania declared war on Bulgaria on 10 July, giving diplomatic assurances that it did not intend to subjugate Bulgaria or defeat its army.

== Romanian offensive ==
On 10 July, following the Romanian declaration of war, General Ioan Culcer's 5th Corps - amounting to 80,000 soldiers crossed the border into the Bulgarian part of Dobruja. That day, the Romanians crossed the Danube at Silistra without meeting resistance. One week later, the Tutrakan-Balchik line had been occupied, and on 16 July Romanian patrols entered Varna. The Tutrakan-Balchik line marked the territory demanded by the Romanians. The cavalry attached to General Culcer's 5th Corps briefly occupied Varna, but withdrew back into Dobruja once it became apparent that no Bulgarian resistance would be offered. On 18 July, a brigade of the Bulgarian 1st Army - which was retreating south was captured by the 1st Romanian Cavalry Division. The Bulgarian brigade offered no resistance. The Chief of Operations of the Romanian 1st Cavalry Division was Ion Antonescu, who was awarded the Medal of Military Virtue in Gold, personally presented to him by Prince Ferdinand. Antonescu was one of the only two to receive this award during the campaign.

== Aftermath ==
The Romanians suffered no combat casualties, as there was no resistance. The Bulgarians agreed to cede Southern Dobruja to Romania as early as 19 July. Southern Dobruja - the richest agricultural land of Bulgaria - was officially annexed by Romania following the Treaty of Bucharest. The territory measured 2,970 square miles.
