= 38th Cavalry Regiment =

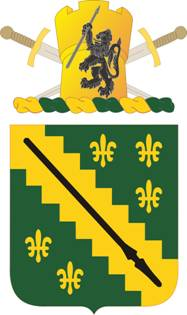
- Coat of arms
- Active: 1916 - 2015
- Country: United States
- Type: Armor
- Motto: "Always In Front"
- Engagements: World War II: Ardennes-Alsace; Central Europe; Operation Enduring Freedom

Insignia
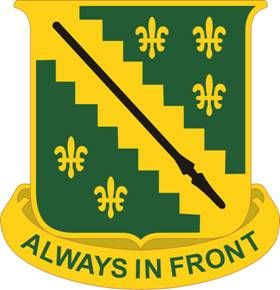
- Distinctive unit insignia

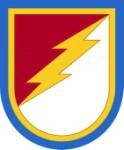
- Beret flash

The 38th Cavalry Regiment was a regiment of the United States Army first established in 1916. It was the regimental affiliate of three reconnaissance and surveillance squadrons (1st, 2nd, 3rd) that were part of battlefield surveillance brigades.

== History ==
During World War II, the 3d Reconnaissance Squadron was activated as part of the 1st Cavalry Division on 15 November 1942 at Fort Bliss, Texas. On 21 November 1943, it was redesignated as the 38th Cavalry Reconnaissance Squadron (Mechanized) at Exeter, England and assigned to the 102d Cavalry Regiment(Mechanized).

The 38th shipped from the New York Port of Embarkation on 15 November 1943 and arrived in Scotland five days later and disembarked at the Firth of Clyde. Following a period of training in the United Kingdom, it arrived in France on 12 June 1944, shortly after the Normandy invasion. Entered Paris on 25 August 1944 and is recognized as the first American units to enter the capital city. It reached Belgium on 4 September 1944 and Germany on 30 March 1945. In August 1945 it was located at Prestice, Czechoslovakia. Returning to the United States, it was inactivated on 28 November 1945 at Camp Kilmer, New Jersey. During the war in Europe, the 38th was attached to the 102nd Cavalry Group (Mechanized). [edit]

== Distinctive unit insignia ==
- Description

A Gold color metal and enamel device 1 1/8 inches (2.9 cm) in height overall consisting of a shield blazoned: Vert, on a bend indented Or between five fleurs-de-lis three to chief and two to base of the like, a tilting spear Sable. Attached below the shield is a Gold scroll inscribed "ALWAYS IN FRONT" in Green letters.

- Symbolism

The colors, green and yellow, are those of Armor. The spear, black on gold, represents Cavalry descent. The five fleurs-de-lis are the traditional symbols of European battle honors and represent the unit's World War II campaigns. The indented diagonal band represents a path between hostile lines, symbolizing the primary functions of a reconnaissance unit.

- Background

The distinctive unit insignia was originally approved for the 38th Reconnaissance Battalion on 24 August 1951. It was redesignated for the 38th Cavalry Regiment with the description and symbolism updated on 24 July 2008.

== Coat of arms ==
- Blazon
  - Shield- Vert, on a bend indented Or between five fleurs-de-lis three to chief and two to base of the like, a tilting spear Sable.
  - Crest- From a wreath Or and Vert, in front of two broad swords points down saltirewise Proper a crenellated tower of the first bearing a lion rampant Sable holding in upraised dexter claws a spear Gris.
  - Motto- ALWAYS IN FRONT.
- Symbolism
  - Shield- The colors, green and yellow, are those of Armor. The spear, black on gold, represents Cavalry descent. The five fleurs-de-lis are the traditional symbols of European battle honors and represent the unit's World War II campaigns. The indented diagonal band represents a path between hostile lines, symbolizing the primary functions of a reconnaissance unit.
  - Crest- The tower represents campaigns in the Rhineland and Central Europe in which the Regiment participated during World War II. The black lion and spear, symbols used by Belgium, recall the decorations awarded the unit by that Nation for actions in its defense. The swords signify unit campaigns in Belgium, Germany, and Czechoslovakia towards the end of the war and recall the award of the Presidential Unit Citation in 1945.
- Background- The coat of arms was originally approved for the 38th Reconnaissance Battalion on 24 August 1951. It was redesignated for the 38th Cavalry Regiment and amended to add a crest on 1 October 2008.

== Former Configuration ==
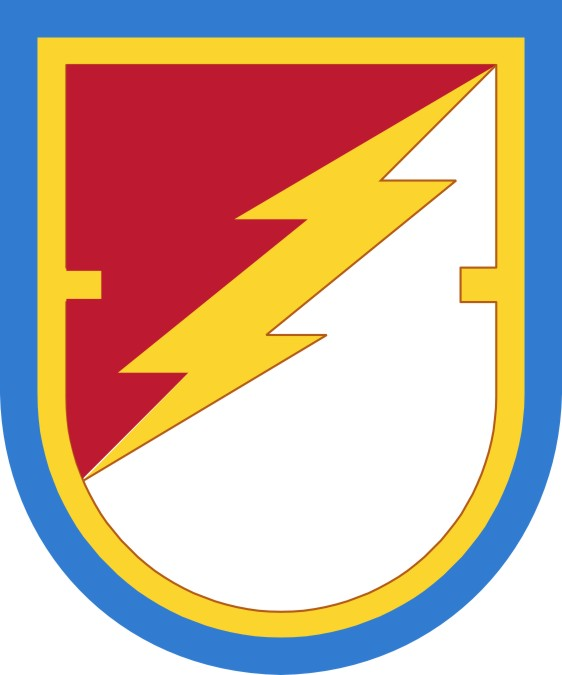
- 1st Squadron, 38th Cavalry Regiment (525th Battlefield Surveillance Brigade, Fort Bragg, NC)
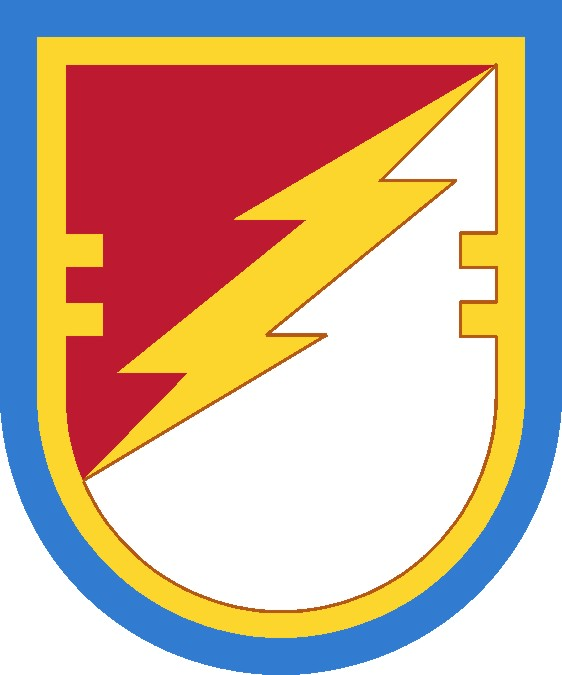
- 2nd Squadron, 38th Cavalry Regiment (504th Battlefield Surveillance Brigade, Fort Hood, TX)
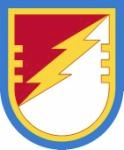
- 3rd Squadron, 38th Cavalry Regiment (201st Battlefield Surveillance Brigade, Joint Base Lewis-McChord, WA)
