= 38 Squadron =

38 Squadron or 38th Squadron may refer to:

- No. 38 Squadron RAAF, a unit of the Royal Australian Air Force
- No. 38 Squadron RAF, a unit of the United Kingdom Royal Air Force
- 38th Bombardment Squadron, a unit of the United States Air Force
- 38th Expeditionary Airlift Squadron, a unit of the United States Air Force
- 38th Rescue Squadron, a unit of the United States Air Force
- 38th Reconnaissance Squadron, a unit of the United States Air Force
- 38th Tactical Reconnaissance Squadron, a unit of the United States Air Force
- 38th Troop Carrier Squadron, a unit of the United States Army Air Forces
- Marine Wing Communications Squadron 38, a unit of the United States Marine Corps
- Marine Tactical Air Command Squadron 38, a unit of the United States Marine Corps

== See also ==
- 38th Division (disambiguation)
- 38th Brigade (disambiguation)
- 38th Regiment (disambiguation)
- 38th Wing (disambiguation)
