= Staines Informer =

The Staines Informer is a weekly free newspaper distributed in the area in and around Staines-upon-Thames. It is owned by the Trinity Mirror group (later renamed Reach plc) through their North Surrey and London Newspapers division.

The Staines Informer began in 1974. Several other 'free-sheets' were already being circulated within this lucrative advertising area, but these usually lacked any editorial substance and were very much of the "read it and chuck it" variety. The Informer offered a new style of free-sheet which also soon challenged the long established local "paid for" weekly press. The new entrant's mix of human interest stories, entertainment reviews, lifestyle features and informative advertorial soon garnered it a lot of local respect. It became a newspaper which people retained for the whole week and consulted when needing local information or services. It was the largest title in the West London Informer group of newspapers.

The main editorial areas covered by The Staines Informer today are the Surrey boroughs of Spelt Horne, Runnymede and Elmbridge. The Staines Informer is distributed every Thursday and is based at offices in East worth Road, Chertsey, also the base for its sister papers the Staines, Egham News, and Surrey Herald. It had a circulation of 45,640 in 2010 and 28,493 in 2015.
