= 38th Division =

38th Division or 38th Infantry Division may refer to:

== Infantry divisions ==
- 38th Infantry Division (France)
- 38th Division (German Empire)
- 38th Landwehr Division, German Empire; see German Army order of battle, Western Front (1918)
- 38th Infantry Division (Wehrmacht)
- 38th SS Grenadier Division Nibelungen
- 38th Infantry Division "Puglie", Kingdom of Italy
- 38th Division (Imperial Japanese Army)
- 38th Infantry Division (Ottoman Empire)
- 38th Infantry Division (Poland)
- 38th Infantry Division (Russian Empire)
- 38th Rifle Division, Soviet Union
- 38th Guards Mechanised Division, Soviet Union
- 38th Guards Rifle Division, later 38th Guards Motor Rifle Division, Soviet Union
- 38th (Welsh) Infantry Division, United Kingdom
- 38th Infantry Division (United States)
- 38th Division (Yugoslav Partisans)
- 38th Infantry Division Dravska, Royal Yugoslav Army

== Armoured divisions ==
- 38th Guards Tank Division, Soviet Union
- 38th Tank Division, Soviet Union
- 38th Division (Israel)

== Aviation divisions ==
- 38th Air Division, United States Air Force

== See also ==
- List of military divisions by number
- 38th Army (disambiguation)
- 38th Brigade (disambiguation)
- 38th Regiment (disambiguation)
- 38th Wing (disambiguation)
- 38th Squadron (disambiguation)
