= 38th Brigade =

38th Brigade may refer to:

== Belarus ==
- 38th Separate Guards Air Assault Brigade, a unit of the Special Forces of Belarus

== Canada ==
- 38 Canadian Brigade Group, a unit of the Canadian Army

== India ==
- 38th Indian Infantry Brigade, a unit of the British Indian Army

== Japan ==
- 38th Independent Mixed Brigade (Imperial Japanese Army)

== Russia ==
- 38th Guards Communications Brigade, a unit of the Russian Airborne Forces
- 38th Separate Guards Motor Rifle Brigade

== Ukraine ==
- 38th Marine Brigade (Ukraine)

== United Kingdom ==
- 38th Brigade (United Kingdom)
- 38th (Irish) Brigade
- 38th Light Anti-Aircraft Brigade (United Kingdom)
- 38th Brigade, Royal Garrison Artillery

== United States ==
- 38th Air Defense Artillery Brigade (United States)
- 38th Combat Aviation Brigade
- 38th Division Sustainment Brigade

== See also ==
- 38th Division (disambiguation)
- 38th Regiment (disambiguation)
- 38th Wing (disambiguation)
- 38 Squadron (disambiguation)
