= Canterbury, and Nelson-Marlborough and West Coast Regiment =

Military unit of the New Zealand Army

The Canterbury, and Nelson-Marlborough and West Coast Regiment
- Active: 1964–2012
- Country: New Zealand
- Branch: New Zealand Army
- Type: Line Infantry
- Role: Light Infantry
- Size: One battlegroup
- Garrison/HQ: RHQ Burnham
- Mottos: Ake Ake Kia Kaha (Forever and Ever Be Strong)
- March: Quick – The Hundred Pipers; Quick – Charles Upham March; Slow – Greensleeves
- Mascot: The Ram
- Anniversaries: 27 June 1942

Commanders
- Current Commanding Officer (CO): Lt Col G.A. McMillian

Insignia
- Unit Shoulder Flash
- Abbreviation: 2CantNMWC

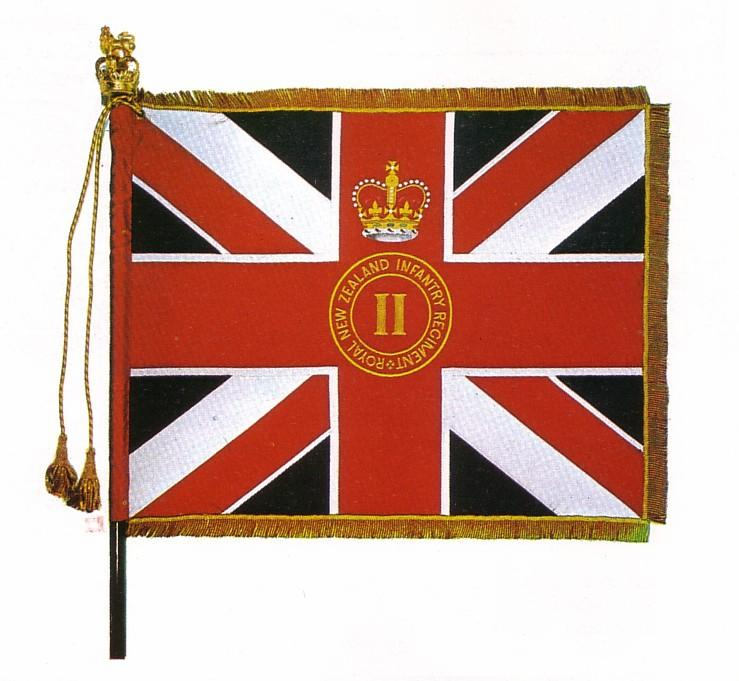
Queen's Colour

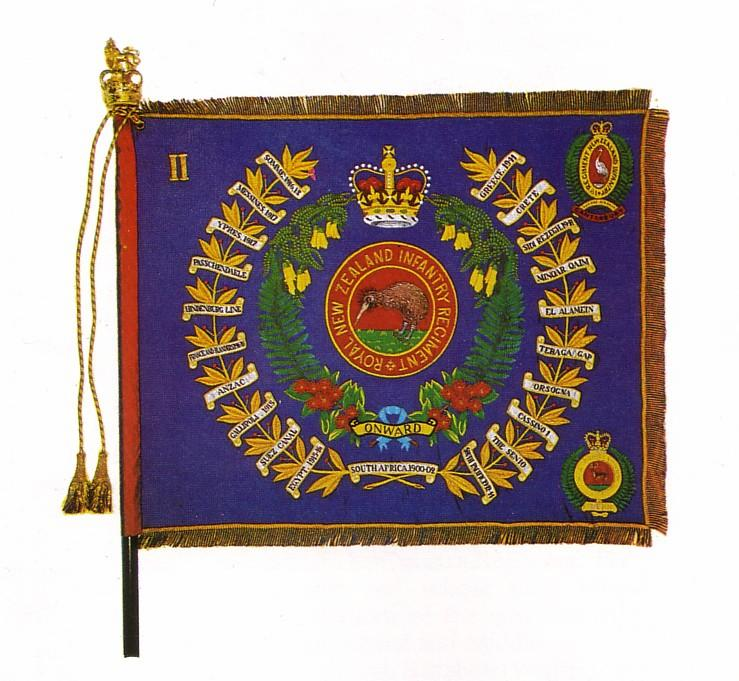
Regimental Colour

The Canterbury, and Nelson-Marlborough and West Coast Regiment was a Territorial Force (Army Reserve) unit of the New Zealand Army.

== Formation and recent history ==
The regiment was formed in 1964 during the reorganisation of the army by the amalgamation of two separate regiments: the Canterbury Regiment and the Nelson, Marlborough, West Coast Regiment. In turn, those two regiments had originally been formed from the 1st (Canterbury) and 2nd (South Canterbury) and the 12th (Nelson and Marlborough) and 13th (North Canterbury and Westland) Regiments which had been initially raised in the early 1900s, following the formation of gazetted militia units in 1859.

The 1964 amalgamation saw the new Territorial Force battalion become the Second Battalion of the Royal New Zealand Infantry Regiment. This was until the later reorganisation of 1999, which saw the Territorial Force battalions split from the RNZIR to become multi-function battalion groups. The 2nd Battalion (Canterbury, and Nelson-Marlborough and West Coast) RNZIR became the 2nd Canterbury (Nelson, Marlborough, West Coast) Battalion Group, with the following sub-unit types:

=== Companies ===
- A Company: Greymouth*,
- B Company: Christchurch,
- C Company: Timaru,
- D Company: Nelson,
- Support Company: Christchurch, Blenheim and Ashburton,
- Logistics Company

=== Artillery ===
The 3rd Field Regiment was the Artillery Regiment based in the South Island. It had two Battery's, 31 (B) and 32 (E). 32 (E) Battery (Christchurch), was connected to the 2nd Cant NMWC Battalion.

=== Brass Band ===
In December 2012, 2nd Canterbury (Nelson, Marlborough, West Coast) Battalion Group merged with 4th Otago and Southland Battalion Group to form 2/4 Battalion.

Which now consists of three Companies:

- A Company
- B Company
- C Company

== Predecessor units ==
=== 1843–1845 Nelson ===
The Nelson Battalion of Militia was the first NZ Army Unit formed in the South Island and one of the first in New Zealand. The settlers of Nelson had become apprehensive following a battle near Tuamarina on the Wairau Plains in 1843. Tensions became raised when settlers began marking out land which was 'owned' by maori. Captain Arthur Wakefield, who was the leader of the Nelson settlement had sent surveyors to the Wairau Valley, in a belief that the land had been purchased. The surveyors were removed by Te Rauparaha, chief of Ngati Toa, who made it clear that no such purchase had ever taken place. On this first occasion, there was no violence, however a hut which was used by the surveyors was burnt down which led to an attempted arrest of Te Rauparaha on a charge of arson. The Chief Constable who also served as the Magistrate along with a force of laborers armed with muskets, marched into the Wairau valley with the aim of handcuffing and arresting Te Rauparaha. Te Rauparaha urged that the dispute be held at a later date upon the arrival of Land Commissioner, but a shot was fired by one of the Chief Constables men. This led to a small skirmish taking place which lead to the death of nine of the Europeans and seven Maori, one of whom was the wife of Te Rangihaeata (Te Rauparaha's nephew). Captain Wakefield and 12 others were taken prisoner. Later Te Rauparaha killed the prisoners to avenge the death of the wife of Te Rangihaeata. At a later date, a magisterial hearing took place and found that the Maori were justified in resisting the taking of their land but the killing of prisoners might be allowable in Maori culture was not acceptable to the European systems. No further action was taken on Te Rauparaha. However, on the return of 27 survivors, which was termed as the 'Wairau Massacre', to Nelson the whole settlement felt endangered. Following a meeting in 1843, it was decided to build a fort on the hill where Christ's Church Cathedral now stands. This fort was called 'Fort Arthur'.

Fort Arthur had inner and outer barricades, the inner one having loop holes and corner watch towers, and the outer barricade included a ditch and drawbridge. The Fort was built by the New Zealand Company. It was to become in 1845 the first military "place of parade" in the South Island.

In January 1845 a Maori Chief, Paremata, Threatened the settlers in Happy Valley. Paremata had been captured by a Southern Chief, Tuawaike, and had had his ears cut off and then been kept as a slave. On his return, he set up a Pa at Wakapuaka. Payment was made for the land purchases from Maori, by the settlers. This money went to Te Rauparaha, who was the paramount chief of the area which included Nelson and part of Marlborough. The Kapiti chief kept all of the payments and Paremata expressed his frustration and annoyance at this. He lodged a complaint with the Commissioner of Land Claims, Mr Spain. A court hearing was heard in Nelson and Paremata was awarded a share of Te Rauparaha's payment, but the issue was far from settled. Paremata began to intimidate the settlers of Nelson and the outer areas into paying him more. Paremata went into the North Island where he began recruiting warriors in 1844. He returned to the region with 100 warriors in January 1845. Some of these men had come from the Waikato. Word spread around the Nelson Settlers that Paremata had returned with a force. After a few days Paremata had landed at the bluffs of the Boulder Bank and went to Happy Valley where he visited the houses of settlers and ordered them to leave their houses and give the land back, as it had never been paid for. Paremata declared that the land was his and if the settlers refused to leave, he would return and burn their houses down and make "Kai" of those who lived in them. The threats were accompanied by gestures which included raising their tomahawks over their heads.

Towards the evening, the Maori's left the valley and moved to Mr Jollie's farm which was a mile closer to Nelson. Fires were lit close to the thatched buildings and ripe crops in the paddocks. They made similar threats to Mr Jollie as they had done to the settlers earlier. They danced and whooped around the farmhouse till four in the morning, yelling in a threatening manner. Then they left, and threatened Mr Jollie that when they returned they would kill him if he had not left.

These two episodes reached the settlers in Nelson, and it was thought that building Fort Arthur was one of the wises decisions to have been made, as the fort would afford ample protection if Paremata and his men had attempted to sack the town. On 15 January 1845 the Magistrate, Mr Sinclair, who was accompanied by Mr John Tinline as his interpreter, went to Happy Valley and sent word to Paremata demanding his attendance. Paremata arrived with 18 followers armed with tomahawks.

Mr Sinclair issued a demand that Paremata and all his tribe should return to their Pa five miles away and stay there and cease molesting the settlers. This is when Paremata flew into a great fury. He declared that the valley was his, and that he would drive out all settlers from the valley. He then threatened Mr Sinclair by saying "that he would treat Sinclair and his interpreter as Rauparaha had treated Thompson and Brooks at the Wairau in 1843-by knocking on the head." Mr Tinline began to calm Paremata down and secured a promise from Paremata that no rash action would be taken for two weeks. In the meantime Mr Spain had drawn up land boundaries which belonged to the government and had been legally bought, and these were presented to Mr Sinclair and Tinline. The pair departed Nelson to see Paremata, however Paremata was on the warpath again, and attacked the settlers with greater fury than before. He assaulted several of the settlers and threatened them with death. He broke into a house which belonged to a Mr Gordon, and stole a large quantity of flour. He then took off saying that he would return in five days and destroy everything. On his way back to the Pa he burned the stockyard of a stock dealer, and destroyed a heap of shingles which were awaiting placement on the roof of a building.

The settlers of Nelson were furious over what had taken place. They raised their concerns with the general government. Three days after the burning incidents, the local magistrate called a public meeting and urged restraint, instead the settlers were out beyond the point of restraint and wanted to teach Paremata a lesson. The settlers asked that the magistrate accompanied by a force of volunteers, should go to the valley the following Monday to show Mr Spain's plan to Paremata and to warn him that any further breaches would result in his arrest and punishment.

When the next Sunday came around, the Magistrate called for another meeting and told the populace that he was going to write to Wellington and ask for police protection. The response from the settlers was that this was very foolish course of action, and this led to an expedition to deal with the whole affair once and for all. A force was formed and headed by Mr William Fox, marched on Happy Valley. There were several men in this expedition who later added to New Zealand's history. Mr Fox was later Premier of New Zealand, Mr E. W. Stafford was later to be New Zealand's Premier twice and Mr Alfred Domett would also serve as New Zealand's Premier. Mr John Poynter later was appointed as Nelson's Magistrate and Mr Charles Heaphy who was the first New Zealander awarded the Victoria Cross. The force was made up of 100 men armed with muskets and bayonets. When the force arrived in the valley, Paremata was not found. Instead he was in his Pa, where two clergymen from Nelson had visited. They were the Reverend's Reay and Butt. Mrs Reay had gone to the Pa by sea the previous night when they discovered that an expedition had been organised.

When the force had arrived at the boundary of the Pakeha and Maori lands, they dug in and cut a shallow ditch along the line. Some of the men worked with pick and shovels and others stood armed guard against any rush by the Maoris. The Reverend Reay appeared on the scene and refused to guide the force through the thick bush towards the Pa.

Paremata was eventually shown the plan and told of the ditch. He still protested this and said "that they had been cheated". He made no further trouble for the settlers and that was all that mattered to the settlers and the people of Nelson.

The Volunteer Force reached Nelson at 5pm after a long trek back, and it was decided that the Volunteers would disband, however they did decide to meet regularly and drill in preparation for any other trouble that might appear- this was in spite of a Government edict that armed drilling was illegal=

== 1845 Nelson Battalion of Militia ==
The Militia Act of 1845 made no specific provision for volunteers and was in every respect it was a compulsory system. The following notes cover part of the Acts main provisions:

- 1. With the exception of judges, members of the Legislative Council, Clergyman and Maoris, all male inhabitants aged between 18 and 60 were liable for service.
- 2. Police Magistrates and Justices of the Peace were to complete Militia lists every March. (These were posted up on the local Court House door).
- 3. Militia units could be formed for exercise and training in districts where a threat appeared apparent. (This threat had to be verified by the Governor).
- 4. Officers were appointed by the Governor, who also was empowered to "call out" the Militia for actual service in any case of imminent danger to a settlement.
- 5. Militiamen could not be compelled to move more than 25 miles from the Police Office of their district.
- 6. Militiamen who were called up for training were to train for 28 days a year.

The Battalion had two companied each of 50 men. the Commandant was Captain Donald Sinclair (Nelson Magistrate). His appointment and those of eight other officers was gazetted on 28 August 1845 (Gaz24/45 page 114). The Gazetted Officers were:

Captains

- Donald Sinclair
- John D. Greenwood
- David Monro

Lieutenants

- Thomas Renwick
- Francis Dillon Bell

Ensigns

- Charles Thrope
- Alexander le Grand Campbell

Quartermaster

- Henry Symour

Adjutant

- Richard Newcombe

The Colonial Secretary's records show that Mr Fox was offered a Captaincy but declined as Mr Sinclair would be in command. Mr Joseph Ford Wilson was offered and accepted a commission as Surgeon on 9 June 1845 but for some reason this was not gazetted.

Hourly parades were held daily at 7 am, 10 am and 4 pm. Uniforms were supplied (blue shirt, sailor type pattern). Arms were old flint-lock muskets-the weapons that had been imported for bartering with the Maoris.

The first routine order of the Battalion was dated 28 August 1845 and is preserved in the Alexander library.

Initially the Battalion trained three times a day for the first 28 days and the original roll book includes and order dated 19 September 1845 laying down the pay and equipment procedures for the "28 day" men who were to march out the following week. Many of those who had volunteered for three months, gave notice on 18 October that they wished to redeem their pledge.

== 1859 Volunteer Corps of Nelson Rifles ==
In August 1859 the Superintendent called a public meeting where he proposed to form an armed corps of volunteers. On 16 February 1860 at a meeting that was held at the Whakatu Hotel, rules for the corps were drawn up and Officers who had been "elected" had their names put forward to the Governor for approval. On 28 March 1859 the first drill was held at 06:30.

On 27 February 1860 the Militia District of Nelson was established.

On 9 June 1860, the Nelson Volunteer Rifles was officially established. In 1861 the NVR was Commanded by:

- Commanding Officer: Lt Col Matthew Richmond CB
- Adjutant Captain J. W. Lockett
- Number 1 Coy-Nelson City – (Capt W. T. Travers)
- Number 2 Coy-Nelson City – (Capt N. Edwards)
- Number 3 Coy-Was not gazetted until 9 June 1862
- Number 4 Coy-Suburban North – (Capt Jas MacKay)
- Number 5 Coy-Motueka – (Capt F. Horneman)
- Number 6 Coy-Waimea East – (Capt G. Sparrow)
- Number 7 Coy-Waimea South – (Capt J. Wilson)
- Number 8 Coy-Nelson – (Capt N.G. Morse)
- Number 9 Coy – No Record of Officers – Nelson

=== Nelson Rifle Volunteers 1862 ===
No 1 (City) Company Nelson Rifle Volunteers raised on 25 April 1866 name was later changed in 1871 to the Nelson City Rifle Volunteers. It was later disbanded on 16 March 1896

No 2 Company Waimea East raised on 14 April 1866. It was later disbanded on 26 April 1867

No 3 Company Waimea West riased on 2 June 1866. It was later disbanded on 30 June 1875

The Stoke Rifle Volunteers was raised on 5 April 1873 The Stoke Rifle Volunteers was later renamed A Company of the 1st Battalion of the Nelson Infantry Volunteers in 1901 and then later it became A Company of the 12th Nelson Battalion in 1911

When the new Corps, the Waimea Rifle Volunteers was raised in 1879 served until becoming C Company of the 12th Nelson Battalion in 1911. Brigadier Latter, former Honorary Colonel of the 2nd Cant NMWC Battalion recorded information given to him by the late Lt Col Bryant who said "Under Captain Franklyn, the Corps was directly descended from the Waimea South No 7 Coy pre 1862. That Coy became No 3 Coy from 1862–65. It re-registered and was accepted as the Waimea West Company". Lt Col Bryant stated that it was renamed the Normanby Hussars in 1875 and "reluctantly changed to the Waimea Rifle Volunteers in 1879". Lt Col Bryant also mentioned that there was an argument as to whether it should change to Cavalry in 1875. The period as Cavalry, would prevent any challenged of other Corps' seniority. According to the writing's of Brig Latter found Gazette extracts as follows: No 3 Coy disbanded on the 30th/06/1875 (Gaz 37/75); Waimea Cavalry Vols accepted 3/5/75 (Gaz 37/75) Changed named to Normanby Hussars on the 30/11/75 (Gaz 68/75) Disbanded 1/7/79 (Gaz 72/79). The Marquis of Normanby was the Governor and visited Nelson in 1875.

As a Port City, Nelson had an early association with Naval Artillery. On 21 September 1860 Captain Arkesten, Lieutenant's Trewheller and Stock were commissioned in the Nelson Naval Artillery. In January 1875 a new Corps was formed named the Nelson Naval Brigade was formed. On 23 November 1897 the named was changed to the Nelson Coast Guards and then this Corps trained as infantry. On 16 February 1899 it was re-formed as the Nelson Rifle Volunteers and went to serve on to become D Company of the new Regiment.

The Nelson College Volunteer Cycle Corps was raised on 24 May 1902 and was later disbanded on 28 February 1906.

=== Nelson District Commanders 1860–1911 ===
- Lt Col M. Richmond, CB. 1860–1872
- Maj N.G. Morse 1872
- Capt E. Baigent 1874
- Capt J.T. Marshall 1875–1877
- Maj A. Pitt 1877–1895
- Lt Col A. Pitt 1895–1899
- Lt Col Hon J.A. Bonar 1899–1900
- Capt (later acting Lt Col) Wolf, GCB. 1900–1906
- Maj J.L. Joyce 1906–1911

=== 1st Battalion Nelson Infantry Volunteers 1901–1910 ===
- Commanding Officer: Maj W. S. Littlejohn 1901–1909
- Commanding Officer: Lt Col G. A. Harkness V.D. 1909–1910
- Second in Command: Maj W. D. Bryant V.D.
- Adjutant: Capt R. W. Stiles V.D.

=== 2nd Battalion Nelson Infantry Volunteers 1901–1910 ===
- Commanding Officer: Lt Col C. G. F. Morice 1901–1909
- Commanding Officer: Maj J. C. Macfarlane 1909–1910
- Second in Command: Maj W. S. Austin

== Marlborough Rifle Volunteers ==
The Marlborough Militia District was gazetted on 27 February 1860, Captain W. D. H. Baillie was appointed to command the Marlborough Rifles Volunteers on 2 March 1861. He continued to command the Marlborough Militia and Volunteer District. He was promoted to Major in 1881, and later Lieutenant Colonel in 1889. He relinquished command in 1893. The Marlborough District came under command of Nelson in 1895. Other Officers Commissioned in Marlborough in 1864 were Captain W. A. T. Kenny, Captain J. T. Robinson and Lieutenant T. G. Baillie. There are also records that show 62 residents of Mahakipawa offered to form a Corps of Volunteers however there is no Gazette that records any information.

Marlborough Rifle Volunteers was raised on 5 March 1861

- Number 1 Coy-Marlborough Rifles was raised on 21 June 1861
- Number 2 Coy-Picton Rangers was raised on 2 February 1861

The Marlborough Rangers Volunteers was raised on 22 February 1866 and had two Company's

- Blenheim Company was raised on 4 November 1868. It was later disbanded on 30 January 1871
- Picton Company was raised on 4 November 1868. It was later disbanded on 20 March 1883

Three new Companys of the Marlborough Rifle Volunteers were later formed:

Prince Alfred Company raised on 6 August 1868 later disbanded on 21 May 1873

Spring Creek Company raised on 14 November 1870 later disbanded on 25 May 1887

Renwicktown Company raised on 28 January 1871 and was re-gazetted as the Renwick Rifle Volunteers in 1874, and later disbanded on 6 September 1881.

== Canterbury Military District ==
=== Volunteer Corps of Canterbury Rifles ===
- Number 1-Christchurch – (Captain Atkinson)
- Number 2-Christchurch – (Captain T.W. White)
- Number 3-Lyttelton
- Number 4-Lyttelton
- Number 5-Kaiapoi
- Number 6-Southern Volunteer Rifles (Name changed to Forest Rifle Volunteers on 19 April 1861)

On 28 June 1859, the Governor-in-Council, defined the military district of Christchurch and designated the force within the district to be a single battalion. Captain Henry Arthur Scott was appointed Captain of the Volunteer Corps of the Canterbury Rifles. As the units founding Officer-Commanding, he was given the responsibility of heading the volunteer movement within Canterbury. He lived in Glenmore and ran the Glenthorne Run. On 5 August 1859 Captain Scott convened a meeting in the Golden Fleece Hotel. It would not be until April 1860 when 155 'would be' volunteers demanded another meeting, the next meeting was held in the Market Hotel on 19 April. In 1872, he returned to his native Wales.

On 8 April 1865 the Christchurch City Guards were formed. Then in 1911 it became the 1st Canterbury Regiment, thus providing an unbroken link.

No 1 Battalion Canterbury Rifle Volunteers was formed on 28 March 1866. The badge was the Provisional Arms of Canterbury over the motto "Pro Aris et Focis". The first Battalion HQ was made up of the following:

Commanding Officer: Major T. Wollaston-White Adjutant: Captain G. Armstrong

No 1 Company formed on 28 March 1866 Coy Commander: Captain Crosbie Ward

- Lieutenant Cook
- Ensign Tippetts

Later No 1 Company became the Christchurch Artillery Volunteers on 31 December 1867 and later it was called E Battery and then was renamed as 32 E Battery of the Third Field Regiment, RNZA.

The Temuka Company was raised on 28 March 1868 and was renamed No 1 (Temuka) Company.

No 2 Company was formed on 28 March 1866 Coy Commander: Lt R. J. S. Harman

- Ensign Mitton

No 2 Company was disbanded on 29 November 1869.

No 3 Company was raised on 20 September 1866. Coy Commander: Capt Murray-Aynesley

- Ensign Wright

No 3 Company was disbanded on 21 December 1871.

No 4 Company (Rangiora) was raised on 19 April 1866

No 4 Company was disbanded on 23 December 1874

No 5 Company (Kaiapoi) was raised on 28 March 1866 Coy Commander: Capt Fuller

- Lt Beswick
- Ensign Black

No 5 Company was disbanded on 30 July 1879

No 6 Company was raised on 28 March 1866 In 1877 No 6 Company was renamed the Christchurch City Guards Coy Commander: Capt Stewart

- Lt Hilton
- Ensign Dawson

The Christchurch City Guards was disbanded in 1910

No 7 Company (Timaru) was raised on 17 May 1866

No 7 Company was disbanded on 10 July 1868

No 8 Company (Heathcote) was raised on 28 March 1866 In 1870 No 8 Company was changed to an Engineer Company Coy Commander: Capt Holmes

- Lt Dobson
- Ensign Fitmaurice

No 9 Company (Woodend) was raised on 11 October 1866

No 9 Company was disbanded on 9 May 1868

No 10 Company (Oxford) was raised on 18 October 1866

No 10 Company was disbanded on 9 May 1868

The Christchurch Royal Irish Company of Rifle Volunteers was raised on 18 November 1868 The company was renamed the No 2 (Royal Irish Company) in 1871 and then disbanded on 11 August 1874

The Ashburton Rifle Volunteers was raised on 15 August 1879

The Christchurch Rifle Volunteers was raised on 1 January 1883 and was amalgamated with the Christchurch City Guards in 1893

The Christ's College Rifle Volunteers was raised on 1 January 1883 and was formed by the old boys of the college. The unit served until 1911 when it was renamed as B Company of the 1st Canterbury Battalion

The Sydenham Rifle Volunteers was raised on 11 January 1883 and was renamed as the Canterbury Irish Rifle Volunteers until it was amalgamated with the Christchurch City Rifle Volunteers until becoming C Company of the 1st Canterbury Battalion in 1911. On 12 July 1898 another Sydenham Rifle Volunteers Corps was raised until becoming A Company of the 13th (North Canterbury) Regiment in 1911

The Canterbury Scottish Rifle Volunteers was raised on 12 February 1885 until being disbanded on 12 December 1893

The Richmond (Christchurch) Rifle Volunteers was raised on 30 April 1885 and was disbanded on 9 February 1895

The Kaiapoi Rifle Volunteers (later disbanded in 1879) and re-raised on 30 April 1885 and later became D Company of the 1st Canterbury Battalion in 1911

The Rangiora Rifle Volunteers (Later disbanded in 1874) and was re-raised on 11 November 1886 and later became E Company of the 1st Canterbury Battalion in 1911

The Imperial Rifle Volunteers was raised on 21 October 1897 and later became F Company of the 1st Canterbury Battalion in 1911

The Woolston (Christchurch) Rifle Volunteers was raised on 6 May 1885 and was disbanded on 22 June 1886

The Heathcote Rifle Volunteers was raised on 20 August 1886 and was disbanded on 19 February 1892.

The Following corps served until 1911 when they later became part of the 13th (North Canterbury) Battalion

The Linwood Rifle Volunteers was raised on 17 November 1898

The Christchurch Civil Service Rifle Volunteers was raised on 9 May 1900 and later became C Company of the 13th Battalion

The Canterbury Highland Rifle Volunteers was raised on 10 September 1900 and later became D Company of the 13th Battalion

The Canterbury Native Rifle Volunteers was raised on 10 September 1900 and later became F Company of the 13th Battalion

The Ellesmere Guards Rifle Volunteers with HQ at Doleston, was raised on 31 October 1900 and was later disbanded on 23 October 1906

The Canterbury Scouts Volunteer Reserve was raised on 15 August 1907 and was then disbanded on 4 May 1911.

== 1st (Canterbury) Battalion 1911 Formed ==
On 17 March 1911 the 1st North Canterbury Battalion became the 1st Canterbury Battalion with its Headquarters in Christchurch. Thus a new Battalion was formed. The First Commanding Officer was Lieutenant Colonel the Honorable G. J. Smith.

The crest was a white crane flanked by fern fronds surmounted by a crown. The "Crane" was adopted from the crest of a post Colonel, Lt Col Wollaston-White. The "Fern Fronds" were selected as a distinctive New Zealand emblem. The "Crown" signified the Regiments distinction of being the only New Zealand Infantry Regiment to have His Majesty (King George V) the King as Colonel-in-Chief.

The Motto "Ake Ake Kia Kaha" was the closing phrase of Rewi's speech when he refused to surrender his Pa at Orakau in 1864. Translated it means: "We will fight on forever and ever". This was to become the Battalion's Official Motto and was carried on into the 'new' battalion that was formed in 1964 when the 1st Cant Bn and 1st NMWC Bn were amalgamated.

The "new" battalion was made up of six companies which descended from the original Rifle Volunteer Companies.

- A Company (Christchurch City Guards)
- B Company (Christ's College Rifles)
- C Company (Christchurch City)
- D Company (Kaiapoi)
- E Company (Rangiora)
- F Company (Imperial)

The Band was then formed in 1912

During the First World War, one of the 1st Cant Bn own was awarded the Victoria Cross, Sergeant Henry James Nicholas V.C., M.M.

== 2nd (South Canterbury) Battalion 1911 formed ==
The 2nd Battalion was formed in 1911 and was made up of eight companies. The first Commanding Officer was Lieutenant Colonel Beckingham V.D.

The Badge was designed in 1896 by the wife of the then Commanding Officer. It consisted of a Maltese Cross, one which a Kiwi was on top surrounded by a circlet. The circlet was inscribed with the battalion's name. The Motto was "Pro Patria".

- A Company (Timaru City)
- B Company (Temuka)
- C Company (Ashburton)
- D Company (Port Guards)
- E Company (Timaru)
- F Company (Waimate)
- G Company (Geraldine)
- H Company (Ashburton Guards)

== 12th (Nelson) Battalion 1911 formed ==
The 12th Nelson Battalion was formed in 1911 with its first Commanding Officer being Major W. H. Bryant V.D. In 1912 he was promoted to Lieutenant Colonel.

The Badge of the Battalion was a stag, proper, passant, within a circlet which had Nelson Inf, surmounted by the numeral 12 and surrounded by fern leaves.

The battalion was made up of ten companies:

- A Company (Stoke)
- B Company (Blenheim)
- C Company (Waimea)
- D Company (Nelson)
- E Company (Waitohi)
- F Company 1st Westland (Hokitika)
- G Company (Greymouth)
- H Company (Denniston)
- I Company (Reefton)
- J Company (Millerton)

In 1917 the 12th Nelson Battalions changed to the 12th Nelson and Marlborough Battalion. New badges were struck to include the new wording in the circlet.

== 13th (North Canterbury) Battalion formed 1911–1912 ==
The 13th North Canterbury Battalion was formed in 1911 and consisted of six companies. The battalion had the first Honorary Colonel appointed as Maj Gen D. P. Penton C.B, C.V.O. The first commanding officer was Lieutenant Colonel E. Richardson with the adjutant being Captain C. H. J Brown (he was later Killed-in-Action in 1917 as a Brigadier General).

The badge was three huia feathers until the unit changed its name in 1912.

- A Company (Sydenham)
- B Company (Linwood)
- C Company (Christchurch Civil Service)
- D Company (Canterbury Highland)
- E Company-not established
- F Company (Canterbury Native)

In 1912 the 13th North Canterbury became the 13th North Canterbury and Westland Battalion in January 1912. The West Coast Companies were transferred to the newly formed battalion.

With this change the badge of the battalion also changed to the Roman Numerals "XIII" over the "NZI", within a wreath of fern fronds, surmounted by a Crown Imperial. at base of the scroll contained the motto "Kia Pono Tonu" which translated means "Be Faithful".

=== Canterbury District Commanders 1859–1910 ===
- Maj H.A. Scott 1859–1861
- Col T. Wollaston-White 1861–1867
- Maj G. Packe 1867
- Lt Col H.E. Reader 1867–1868
- Lt Col G. Packe 1868–1882
- Lt Col A. Lean 1882–1891
- Lt Col H. Gordon 1891–1901
- Lt Col W.H. Webb 1901–1903
- Col C.W. Porter, CB. 1903–1904
- Lt Col A. Bauchop, CMG. 1904–1906
- Lt Col J.E. Hawkins, VD. 1906–1910

=== 1st Battalion Canterbury Rifle Volunteers 1886–1888 ===
- Commanding Officer: Lt Col A. G. D. Toswill (99th Regiment)
- Second in Command: Major J. Joyce
- Adjutant: Captain F. W. Francis

=== Canterbury Battalion and later North Canterbury Battalion 1895–1903 ===
- Commanding Officer: Lt Col F. W. Francis V.D.
- Second in Command: Major W. A. Day
- Adjutant: Captain H. S. E. Hobday

=== South Canterbury Battalion of Infantry Volunteers 1897 ===
- Commanding Officer: Lt Col W. M. Moore

=== 1st North Canterbury Battalion of Infantry Volunteers 1903–1910 ===
- Commanding Officer: Lt Col W. A. Day 1903–1906
- Second in Command: Major F. Cresswell
- Commanding Officer: Lt Col F. Cresswell V.D. 1906–1910

=== 2nd North Canterbury Battalion of Infantry 1903–1910 ===
- Commanding Officer: Lt Col H. S. E. Hobday 1903–1906
- Second in Command: Major G. J. Smith
- Commanding Officer: Lt Col G. J. Smith 1906–1910

=== Commanding Officers 1st Cant (1923–1948) ===
- Lt Col J. Murphy, VD 1923–1925
- Lt Col N.R. Wilson, DSO, MC, VD. 1925–1926
- Lt Col L.M. Inglis, MC, VD. 1926–1930
- Lt Col S.D. Mason, 1930–1936
- Lt Col H.K. Kippenberger, 1936–1940 (Later Hon Col (Maj Gen))
- Lt Col M. Osborne, ED. 1940–1941
- Lt Col W.R. Lascelles. 1941–1943

== 2nd South Canterbury Regiment ==
In 1880 the district of South Canterbury consisted of two corps. The district had a strong volunteer force which carried on into the end of the volunteer system in 1910 and then into 1911 when the 2nd South Canterbury Regiment was raised.

Prior to the 2nd South Canterbury Regiment these volunteer units were present in the district.

Temuka Rifle Volunteers formed in 1868

Ashburton RIfle Volunteers formed in 1879

Waimate Rifle Volunteers formed on 27 September 1881 and disbanded in 1882

Geraldine Rifle Volunteers formed on 17 April 1885 and was disbanded in 1894 and re-raised in 1899

The Timaru Rifle Volunteers was raised on 22 April 1885

Ashburton Guards Rifle Volunteers was raised on 10 June 1885 and was disbanded on 2 May 1890 and was re raised on 21 April 1899

Timaru Naval Artillery was later renamed to D Company of the Port Guards Rifle Volunteers in 1897

C Battery of the NZ Regiment of Artillery Volunteers was later renamed and changed to an infantry unit being named the Timaru City Rifle Volunteers in 1897

The Canterbury Honorary Reserve Corps of Volunteers was raised in 1885 and was disbanded in 1902

South Canterbury Volunteer Reserve (Timaru) was raised in 1907

== West Coast ==
Under the first two Militia Acts, no forces were raised on the West Coast until 1868. This was taken up with 'typical West Coast enthusiasm', and as a result of the Finian Riots a real need for law and order on the West Coast due to the presence of Fenian recruiters being incredibly active within New Zealand stretching from Whanganui to Invercargill. Hokitika had a large Irish population, became the de facto capital for New Zealand Fenianism. At this time, Father Larkin was a strong champion and voice for Fenianism within Hokitika. On the news of the execution of the 'Manchester Martyrs' Fr Larkin held a funeral parade in Hokitika with an empty coffin which was followed by 900 people on 8 March 1868. It is reputed that Fr Larkin was the brother of one of the killers of a British Police Sergeant. In response Fr Larkin was disciplined by the Roman Catholic Bishop. These actions lead to the local settlers being frightened and calls were made to raise a local Rifle Volunteer unit.

Various letters held in archives quote that 40 residents from Hokitika offered to form a corps. A further 175 residents from Westport offered their support to form a local unit. In response to this 50 rifles and 10,000 ball were sent to Hokitika on 28 March. Later 71 residents from Greymouth volunteered for service. A further 100 men were sworn in and a second corps was formed in that of the 2nd Westland Rifles.

Later 81 men from Ross were sworn in and the 1st Totara Rifles was formed. A further 50 rifles were sent to Hokitika and 110 rifles were sent to Westport. Another 90 men from Charleston volunteered for service and a further 44 men from Kaniere formed the Kaniere Rifles. Mr. Bonar then approached the governor to ask if he would allow Hari Hari and Kaniere to from a joint company.

Officially the 1st Westland Rifle Volunteers was raised and accepted on 13 March 1868. In 1911 the 1st Westland Rifles was absorbed into the 12th Nelson Regiment. The Greymouth Ranger Volunteers was raised on 26 March 1868 however it was disbanded in 1883 and was reformed in 1884 as the Greymouth Rifle Volunteers before being absorbed into the 12th Nelson.

The 2nd Westland Rifle Volunteers was raised and accepted on 26 March 1868 but later it was disbanded on 22 March 1870. The No 1 Company Totara Rifle Volunteers was raised on 31 March 1868 but was then disbanded on 30 June 1875.

The Westport Rifle Volunteers was raised and accepted on 26 March 1868 before being disbanded on 26 August 1869. The Charleston Rifle Volunteers was formed on 17 April 1868 however this unit was disbanded on 1 October 1868.

The first corps formed on the West Coast are as follows:

The 1st Westland Rifle Volunteers raised on 13 March 1868. In 1911 the unit was absorbed into the 12th Nelson Battalion

Greymouth Rangers Rifle Volunteers raised on 26 March 1868. In December 1883 it was disbanded and was re-accepted on 1 January 1884 as the Greymouth Rifle Volunteers until being absorbed into the 12th Nelson Battalion in 1911

2nd Company Westland Rifle Volunteers raised on 26 March 1868. It was then disbanded on 22 March 1870

No 1 Totara Rifle Volunteers raised on 31 March 1868 and then disbanded on 30 June 1875. This company was based at Ross. In April 1891 the original Company was re-accepted as the Totara Rifle Volunteers and then disbanded in 1900

Westport Rifle Volunteers raised on 26 March 1868 and then disbanded in 1869

Charleston Rifle Volunteers was raised on 17 April 1868 and then disbanded in October 1868

By 1880 only two Rifle Corps remained. In 1881 the Kumara Contingent left the 1st Westland Rifle Volunteers and became the Kumara Rifle Volunteers which was raised on 23 August 1881. On 19 July 1899 the Kumara Rifles was disbanded.

Inangahua Rifle Volunteers was raised on 20 August 1885 and was then disbanded in February 1893

Brunnerton Rifle Volunteers was raised on 6 May 1887 it was then disbanded on 12 September 1895. The unit was then reformed as the Brunner Ranger Rifle Volunteers and was accepted in 1900, and was then disbanded in 1904

Wesport Naval Artillery then became the Westport Rifle Volunteers in April 1895 and then changed back to the Artillery with effect of July 1901

Reefton Rifle Volunteers and the Denniston Rifle Volunteers were both raised on 10 September 1900 until being absorbed into a new regiment in 1911

Millerton Rifle Volunteers was raised on 12 May 1904

The Greymouth Naval Artillery was formed in May 1885, however it changed its name to the Mawhera Rifle Volunteers in August 1897 and was then disbanded in September 1898

== 1st Nelson, Marlborough & West Coast Battalion 1948–1964 ==
On 1 December 1948, the 1st Nelson, Marlborough & West Coast Battalion was raised under the Command of Lieutenant Colonel E. E. Richards D.S.O. He was first commissioned into the New Zealand Army in 1937, and served with the 23rd Battalion in the 2nd NZEF. He would later be appointed as the Commanding Officer of the 26th Battalion in 1943, a command he held until 1944. Captain J. R. Morrison was appointed as the Battalion Adjutant in 1948 and both he and the Commanding Officer worked for the next year on building up a suitable command structure of officers and senior non-commissioned officers. The following officers were on the strength of the battalion in 1949:

- Major R. I. Blair O.B.E.
- Major K. Emmanuel
- Major A. H. Dickinson
- Captain H. W. Williams
- Captain R. A. Nottle
- Captain A. F. Cooper
- Captain A. C. Wood
- Captain J. G. Sullivan
- Lieutenant's: T. F. Heggulun, A. H. Parker, G. K. Chapman, R. R. Eastgate, A. K. Rodley, W. A. Reeves, A. H. Eddie, C. V. Neale, J. R. E. Moore, G. J. Thomas, A. C. Hansen, D. A. Barker, R. H. B. Thomas, M. J. Black, G. M. Simister, C. A. C. Carter & E. Goodman.
- Second Lieutenant's: D. G. Bain, A. D. Gibb & I. D. O. McIntosh.

The Battalion Headquarters was based in Nelson along with a Support Company. The Battalion Companies were as follows:

A Company: in Blenheim B Company: in Westport C Company: in Greymouth D Company: in Hokitika

Many of the officers above contributed quite a lot to the future of the battalion and beyond. One of the contributions made was the alliance with the Royal Irish Fusiliers which commenced in 1949. With this alliance came the contribution of the Gaubeen and Hackle being worn by the battalion and later the 2nd Cant NMWC Battalion up until dress standards changing to the 'One' uniform policy in the 1990s.

Quite a large number of officers attended refresher courses at Burnham Camp during 1949. Night parades and training weekends commenced in each company area, alongside the battalion's officers were the strong and experienced non-commissioned officers who had joined the battalion, many of whom had prior service in the 2nd World War and later in 'J' Force and 'K' Force. These men became the backbone of the battalion and like their officer counterparts, they began a strong tradition of service within the 1st NMWC and later that same standard was set, alongside their 1st Canterbury colleagues, that the 2nd Cant NMWC from 1964 until present.

One of the 'new' Battalions first's was ANZAC Day 1950, when the battalion made its first public appearance with officers, non-commissioned officers and a band parading in Nelson. In October 1950, the first annual camp at Burnham camp under the 3rd Infantry Brigade from the 14th until 28 October. Sixy officers and NCOs from the 1st NMWC attended. On their return home they brought with them some of their new equipment including six-pounder anti-tank guns, No. 19 wireless sets and three-inch mortars. In December 1950 investigations had begun to be carried out in the Top House area with the goal of camping there in the future. On 2 and 3 December a total of 60 all ranks held a weekend in bivouacs at Speargrass, near Lake Rotoiti. The training at the camp included a daylight attack on the Buller River bridge followed by a night attack and a church parade.

On 22 February 1951, Colonel D. J. Fountaine D.S.O, M.C, and E.D. was appointed as the Honorary Colonel of the Battalion. Colonel Fountain had enlisted as a private in the 1st NMWC Battalion in 1933. In 1937 he was commissioned and went overseas with the 20th Battalion of the 2nd NZEF and later commanded the 26th Battalion from 1942 to 1943 and then again in October 1944.

A period of 28 years after the battalion was raised, they received their new cap badges. Till then the old 12th and XIII badges were withdrawn and all ranks wore the new badge. The stag on the new badge faced right, whereas the unit had had it facing left on letter heads and other files. This has caused a lively argument for some years. According to the rules of heraldry, animals in badges always face right, therefore the new badge was correct. However animals on colours always face the staff. Thus, if the regimental colour was to be viewed from the reverse side, the stag faced left. The only photograph of the colours that was held by the 1 NMWC had the regimental colour on the wrong side of the sovereigns and thus is being looked at from the reverse side. This photograph possibly contributed to the reason for the confusion. In 1969, the 2nd Cant NMWC Battalion presented the Nelson City Council with an oil painting of the 'wrongly paraded'.

Weekend bivouacs were held at Lake Station and at Harveys Bush and Hina. The Army Engineers worked hard to build some permanent buildings and install an adequate water supply at Lake Station on the Kawatiri Junction side of the Lake Rotoiti airfield. In 1952 the annual camp was held from the 2–16 February. The work on the new site was not complete. The pipeline that was to supply water for the tent lines and the cookhouse, was too short and unfinished. Due to a Government law that all camps for the Compulsory Military Training should be liquor-free, the Officers and SNCOs came up with a unique way of overcoming this 'rule', by setting up the officers and sergeants lines across the road where they were theoretically not part of the camp. On 7 February 1952, on the death of King George VI, a parade was held with officers wearing black armbands for the remainder of the camp. A ceremonial parade was held on 10 February, which saw the regimental colour paraded for the first time since the war, the salute was taken by the Honorary Colonel. The camp involved a three-day field exercise which entailed taking up defence position on the north side of the Buller River. During the annual camp, any 'defaulters' built a badge of stones on the hillside facing the camp, thus continuing a custom that was established at Tapawera 38 years before.

In 1953 the annual camp was held at Lake Station from 7–21 February and was attended by 33 officers and 578 other ranks. The Army Engineers had installed lighting equipment, gravel was spread on the camp roads and personal comfort had improved.

By this time the Senior appointments were:

- Commanding Officer: Lt Col Richards
- Second-in-Command: Major R. I. Blair
- Adjutant: Captain J. S. Manning
- RSM: WO 1 B. Veysey
- HQ Coy: Captain E. J. Goodman
- A Coy: Major T. F. Hegglun
- B Coy: Major A. W. Cooper
- C Coy: Major R. M. S. Orbell
- D Coy: Major W. A. Reeves
- Battalion Padre: ChCl IV H. E. Rowe
- RMO: Major K. Emmanuel

During the annual camp two members of the Sergeant's Mess, Warrant Officer Class II M. H. Alborough and Sergeant F. Larsen, received notification of their inclusion in the Coronation Contingent for Queen Elizabeth II. During this camp a visitors day was held which included a Battalion Parade, games of football for the Fountain Cup and a game between the officers and sergeants for the Rose Bowl. The brigade exercise, under the control of Brigadier E. A. McPhail was dogged by torrential rain and was finally abandoned after the battalion had moved down the Wairau Valley and dug in on the traverse. C Company had pre-planned prior to the camp. Some men from the company had travelled up prior to the site and 'dug in' ample quantities of West Coast beer.

On 24 March the battalion provided a colour guard for the Nelson civic reception of the Governor General. On 2 June 1953, all companies of the battalion paraded for the Coronation Day. That same year, the battalion held its annual camp for the last time at Lake Station. By this time the unit had a strength of 1000 with C Company (Greymouth) being at the parade at the annual camp the Company Commander, Major Orbell, paraded his Company in two halves. The training included Infantry-tank co-operation. C Squadron (Blenheim) of the 3rd Armored Regiment camped with the 1st NMWC, this allowed the battalion to train in 'real-time'. Individual company exercises were held, which involved a company with tanks under command moving across the Buller by the Hegglun's bridge and carrying out an attack across the open tussock on the north side.

At the end of March 1954, Lt Col Richards relinquished command of the battalion and handed over to Lt Col R. I. Blair. He had been commissioned into the 1st NMWC in 1937 and served overseas with the 27th (MG) Battalion in World War 2. He had served as the 2nd in Command of the 1st NMWC Battalion since 1949.

It was announced that all future annual camps would be held at Balmoral, near Lake Tekapo. In January 1955 the Nelson Contingent travelled by road to Blenheim where they then took the train with A Company down to Christchurch where they meet up with B, C and D Companies and boarded a troop train bound for Fairlie. The troop train arrived in the early hours of the morning, and the battalion arrived at the new site for the annual camp as dawn broke. The camp highlight was the 'Duke of York' parades. For that year only, the parade ground was on the slopes of the hill above the camp, where in later years the officer' and sergeants' lines would be sited. The battalion, leaning well forward, plodded up the hill, passed the saluting base with great concentration and then plunged down again. The battalion then settled in and began training hard. Up for grabs was the Irvine Shield, which was originally given to the predecessor unit in 1907. The platoon competition took a full day, which included platoons being tested in all aspects of training. The competition winners were:

- Sports Cup: B Company
- Platoon Competition winners: Lt Stuart's Platoon of C Coy

The brigade exercise, set by Brigadier Parata involved the battalion being a part of a night attack across a minefield. The exercise took place in the Upper Forks area, it is reported that the battlefield sound effects were very realistic.

In 1956, the annual camp was held in January and February. The war phase of training was around defence with an emphasis on counterattack, the battalion exercised near Lake Alexandrina. During the year General Sir Gerald Templar, the Colonel of the Royal Irish Fusiliers, visited the battalion and an honour guard, under the command of Major Goodman, paraded the Regimental Colour at a parade held at Nelson airport. Later the officers of the battalion held a dinner at the Hotel Nelson. This visit cemented a strong alliance between the 1st NMWC and the Royal Irish Fusiliers. Later that year the battalions small bore rifle team won the Royal Irish Fusiliers Allied Regiments tournament.

In 1957 a night exercise was carried out at the annual camp at Tekapo, the phase of war being relief in the line. This was the last camp for the battalion's Commanding Officer Lt Col Blair who handed command over to Lt Col R. M. S. Orbell. During the Second World War Lt Col Orbell had served with the 23rd Battalion being the second in command in Italy.

In 1958 the annual camp was held in January and February at Balmoral. The training that year was based on river crossing.

== Formation of the 'New' Battalion 2nd Canterbury, Nelson, Marlborough & West Coast Battalion 1964 ==
In 1964 the New Zealand Infantry announced in 1963 that the Infantry Battalions would be reduced and 6 Territorial 1 Regular Force Battalion's would be raised. The 1st Canterbury & 1st Nelson, Marlborough & West Coast Battalion's combined to form the 2nd Battalion.

In light of the seniority of the Canterbury Regiment the discussion was had where it was suggested that the new battalion should have the numeral ONE. However, a later meetings, there was an agreement that the Regular Force battalion should be the 1st Battalion and the Cant NMWC Battalion as the should be the senior Territorial Battalion with the numeral TWO.

The first Commanding Officer of the 2nd Cant NMWC was Lt Colonel Murray C. Stanaway M.C. After he had served in Korea, Stanaway joined the 1st NMWC in 1956. He was a school teacher that had moved from Grovetown School near Blenheim to be the Headmastership of Burnham Military Camp School in 1962. That same year he was appointed as the Commanding Officer of the 1st Canterbury Battalion.

Foundation Day Senior Appointments:

- Colonel of the Regiment: Maj Gen Sir William Gentry KBE, CB, DSO
- Honorary Colonel: Brig J. T. Burrows CBE, DSO, ED
- Commanding Officer: Lt Col M. C. Stanaway MC
- Second-in-Command: Maj E. G. Latter MBE
- Adjutant: Lt B. J. Jones
- Regimental Sergeant Major: WO 1 J. Moonlight
- HQ Company (Christchurch): Maj H. T. Dean
- Support Company (Blenheim): Capt M. J. MacDonald
- A Company (Greymouth): Lt J. W. Bateman
- B Company (Ashburton): Maj E. H. Poole
- C Company (Timaru): Capt M. J. Blair
- D Company (Nelson): Capt R. C. Dodson
- Quartermaster: Maj G. R. Wilson
- Regimental Medical Officer: Maj L. F. Jepson
- Padre: ChCl IV Rev F. G. Glen

=== Honorary Colonel of the 1st NMWC Bn ===
- Colonel D. J. Fountaine 1951–1959
- Lt Col E. E. Richards DSO, MC, ED 1959–1962
- Lt Col R. I. Blair OBE, ED 1962–1964

=== Commanding Officers of the 1st NMWC Bn ===
- Lt Col E. E. Richards DSO, MC, ED 1948–1954
- Lt Col R. I. Blair OBE, ED 1954–1957
- Lt Col R. M. S. Orbell OBE, ED 1957–1959
- Lt Col T. F. Hegglun ED 1959–1961
- Lt Col D. H. Blyth 1961–1964

=== Regimental Sergeant Majors 1st NMWC Bn ===
- WO 1 B. Veysey 1949–1956
- WO 1 R. Cairns 1956–1959
- WO 1 C. M. Schwass MBE 1959–1961
- WO 1 V. Boynes 1961–1964

== Honorary Colonels ==
=== 1911–1964 ===
- Colonel Edward Richards DSO, OBE, ED, MiD
  Brigadier Burrows CBE, DSO, ED**, MiD
  Maj Gen D.P. Penton, CB, CVO. 13th (North Canterbury) 1911-unknown
- Maj Gen E.W.C. Chaytor, KCMG, KCVO, CB. 1st (Canterbury) 1920–1921
  - 12th (Nelson & Marlborough) 1920–1921
  - Canterbury 1921–1923
  - Nelson Marlborough & West Coast 1923–1939
- Col The Hon G.J. Smith, CBE, TD. 1st (Canterbury) 1923-unknown
- Maj Gen Sir H. Kippenberger, KBE, CB, DSO & Bar. 1st (Canterbury) 1951–1957
- Brig J.T. Burrows, CBE, DSO, ED. 1st (Canterbury) 1957–1964
- Col D.J. Fountaine, DSO, MC. ED. 1st (Nelson, Marlborough & West Coast) 1951–1959
- Lt Col E.E. Richards, DSO, OBE, ED. 1st (Nelson, Marlborough & West Coast) 1959–1962
- Lt Col R.I. Blair, OBE, ED. 1st (Nelson, Marlborough & West Coast) 1963–1964

=== 2nd Cant NMWC RNZIR Honorary Colonels 1964–2012 ===
- Brig J.T. Burrows, CBE, DSO, ED. 1964–1966
- Brig T.B. Morten, CBE, DSO, ED. 1966–1971
- Col T.F. Hegglun, OBE, ED. 1971–1977
- Col B.H. Palmer, ED. 1977–1982
- Col D.H. Blyth. 1982–1987
- Brig E.G. Latter, MBE, ED. 1987–1992
- Col E.H. Poole, ED. 1992–
- Brig R.E. Menzies, CBE, ED
- Lt Col N.H. Kotua, ED. -2012
- Lt Col Cutler 2012–2016 -2/4 RNZIR
- Lt Col G. Hart 2016–2023-2/4 RNZIR
- Lt Col P. Koorey 2023–Current 2/4 RNZIR

=== 2nd Cant NMWC RNZIR Commanding Officers 1964–2012 ===
- Lt Col M. C. Stanaway MC 1964–1964
- Lt Col R. W. K. Ainge 1964–1966
- Lt Col E. G. Latter MBE, ED 1966–1970 (Later Brigadier and appointed Honorary Colonel)
- Lt Col E. H. Poole ED 1970–1973 (Later Colonel and appointed Honorary Colonel)
- Lt Col M. J. Blair MBE, ED 1973–1976
- Lt Col R. E. Menzies ED 1976–1979 (Later Brigadier and appointed Honorary Colonel)
- Lt Col N. A. Kotua ED 1979–1982 (Later appointed Honorary Colonel)
- Lt Col P. V. Coster OBE, ED 1982–1986
- Lt Col R. G. Milne 1986–1991
- Lt Col P. F. Koorey 1991–
- Lt Col G. S. Trengrove MVO 19..-20.. (Later Brigadier and awarded the DSD and ED)
- Lt Col G. McMillan

=== 2/4 Battalion Commanding Officers 2012–current ===
- Lt Col G. McMillan 2012–2013
- Lt Col A. Brosnan 2013– (First Female Commanding Officer)
- Lt Col T. Tuatini
- Lt Col G. Seeds 2023–Current

== Regimental Sergeant Majors 1st Cant Bn ==
- WO 1 D. H. Cross BEM 1949–1956
- WO 1 A. P.S. Narbey 1956–1959
- WO 1 R. H. E. Hebden 1959–1964
- WO 1 J. Moonlight 1964–1964

== Regimental Sergeant Majors 2nd Cant NMWC Bn ==
- WO 1 J. Moonlight 1964–65
- WO 1 R. P. Flood 1965–65
- WO 1 T.W. Heketa 1965–67
- WO 1 A. J. Hilton 1967–69
- WO 1 H. James BEM 1969–71
- WO 1 K. J. Kennedy 1971–74
- WO 1 R. A. Manning MBE 1974–1977
- WO 1 G. T. Steele 1977–1981
- WO 1 W. J. Walker 1981–1983
- WO 1 R. S. Hill 1983–1984
- WO 1 G. T. Steele 1984–1985
- WO 1 W. B. Hutchinson 1985–1987
- WO 1 P. Tamepo 1987–1990
- WO 1 R. M. James 1990–

== Chaplains of the Regiment ==
- Hon Chap Cl III Rev John McKenzie. Cant Highland Rifle Volunteers (1900-U/K)
- Chap Rev H.R. Dewsbury. No1 North Canterbury Bn (1910)
- ChCl IV Fr J.F.M. Barra. 2nd Bn Canterbury Regt (1914–18)
- ChCl IV Rev W. Bullock. 2nd Bn Canterbury Regt (1914–18)
- ChCl IV Rev Fr P.F. Cullen. 2nd Bn Canterbury Regt (1914–18)
- ChCl III Rev F. Dunnage. 2nd Bn Canterbury Regt (1914–18)
- ChCl IV Rev C.M. Jones. 3rd Bn Canterbury Regt (1914–18)
- ChCl IV Rev J.A. Lush. 2nd Bn Canterbury Regt (1914–18)
- ChCl III Rev Fr J.J. McMenamin. 2nd Bn Canterbury Regt (1914–18)-Killed in Action-Messines, 8 June 1917.
- ChCl IV Rev Fr P. Flynn. 2nd Bn Canterbury Regt (1914–18)
- ChCl IV Rev E.D. Rice. 2nd Bn Canterbury Regt (1914–18)
- ChCl IV Rev G.T. Robson MC, OBE. 1st Bn Canterbury Regt (1914–18)
- ChCl III Rev T.F. Taylor. 1st Bn Canterbury Regt (1914–18)
- ChCl III Rev C.E.O'H. Tobin. 1st Bn Canterbury Regt (1914–18)
- ChCl II Rev F.O. Dawson, OBE. 20th Battalion (1939–45)
- Chcl IV Rev H.I. Hopkins, OBE. (P.O.W) 20th Battalion (1939–45)
- ChCl II Rev G.A.D. Spence, OBE, MC. 20th Battalion (1939–45)
- ChCl II Rev Fr L.P. Spring, OBE. 20th Battalion (1939–45)
- ChCl IV Rev J.S. Strang. 20th & 26th Battalion (1939–45)
- ChCl IV Rev R.J. Griffiths, MBE. 23rd Battalion (1939–45)
- ChCl III Rev H.F. Harding, DSO, MBE. 23rd Battalion (1939–45)
- ChCl IV Rev H. J. W. Knights 1st Canterbury Regiment
- ChCl III Rev S.C. Read (P.O.W.) 23rd Battalion (1939–45)
- ChCl IV Rev N.F. Sansom. 23rd Battalion (1939–45)
- ChCl IV Rev. R.B. Spence. 23rd Battalion (1939–45)
- ChCl IV Rev J.G.B. Talbot. 23rd Battalion (1939–45)
- ChCl III Rev Fr J.L. Kingan. MC. 26th Battalion (1939–45)
- ChCl III Rev J.R. Nairn. 26th Battalion (1939–45)
- ChCl III Rev H.S. Scott. 26th Battalion (1939–45)
- ChCl III Rev Fr J.W. Rodgers. 30th Battalion (1939–45)
- ChCl III Rev Fr W.E. Ryan. 30th Battalion (1939–45)
- ChCl IV Rev H.W. West. 30th Battalion (1939–45)
- ChCl IV Rev. W.D. Whelan. 6th Canterbury Regt (1939–45)
- ChCl IV Rev Purchase 1st Canterbury Battalion (1958–????)
- ChCl III Rev H.E. Rowe. 1st NMWC
- ChCl IV Rev F.G. Glen. 2nd CantNWMC 1964–1967
- ChCl IV Rev K.J. Taylor. 2nd CantNWC
- ChCl IV Rev F. Grieg. 2nd CantNWMC 1966–1970
- ChCl III Rev Fr B.J. Fennessy, ED *** 2nd CantNMWC (1992-20??)
- ChCl III Rev H.M.L. Kirk ED 2nd CantNMWC 2004–2012 (Later appointed Lead Chaplain Southern Area, 1st NZ Bde Linton Camp)

== Battle honours ==
The regiment perpetuates the battle honours awarded to the 23rd, 26th, 30th and 37th Battalions, Second New Zealand Expeditionary Force.

- South Africa 1900–02
- First World War:
  - Somme 1916, 1918,
  - Messines 1917,
  - Ypres 1917,
  - Passchendaele,
  - Hindenburg Line,
  - France and Flanders 1916–18,
  - ANZAC,
  - Gallipoli 1915,
  - Suez Canal,
  - Egypt 1915–16
- Second World War:
  - Greece 1941,
  - Crete,
  - Sidi Rezegh,
  - Minquar Qaim,
  - El Alamein,
  - Tebaga Gap,
  - Orsogna,
  - Cassino I,
  - The Senio,
  - South Pacific 1942–44
  - Solomons,
  - Vella Lavella,
  - Green Islands

=== 1st Canterbury Regiment Battle Honours ===
  - South Africa 1902.
  - Egypt 1915-16,
  - ANZAC,
  - Gallipoli 1915,
  - Somme 1916–18,
  - Messines 1917,
  - Ypres,
  - Hindenberg Line,
  - Selle,
  - France and Flanders

=== 1st Nelson Marlborough West Coast Regiment Battle Honours ===
  - South Africa 1900-1902,
  - Egypt 1915-16,
  - Landings on ANZAC,
  - ANZAC,
  - Gallipoli 1915,
  - Sari Bair,
  - Messines 1917,
  - Hindenburg Line,
  - Passchendale,
  - Somme 1916–1918
  - Suez Canal 1917,
  - France and Flanders

== Alliances ==
- United Kingdom – The Rifles
- United Kingdom – The Princess of Wales's Royal Regiment (Queen's and Royal Hampshire)
- United Kingdom – The Royal Irish Regiment (27th (Inniskilling) 83rd and 87th and The Ulster Defence Regiment)
- Australia – University of New South Wales Regiment

== Freedoms ==
The regiment was granted the following freedoms:

- City of Timaru (1965)
- City of Christchurch (1966)
- City of Nelson (1969)
- Borough of Ashburton
- Borough of Greymouth
- District of Marlborough

== Notable members ==
- Captain C.Upham VC and Bar-C Company, 20th Battalion
- Sergeant H.J. Nicholas, VC, MM-12th Nelson Company (Killed in Action at Beaudigny 23 October 1918)
- Sergeant J.Hinton VC-20th Battalion
- Sergeant C.Hulme VC-23rd Battalion
- Major General Sir E.W.C. Chaytor, KCMG, KCVO, CB
- Major General L.M. Inglis, CB, CBE, DSO, MC, VD, ED
- Major General Sir Howard Kippenberger, KBE, CB, DSO & Bar
- Brigadier Burrows, CBE, DSO, ED **
- Colonel Hon G.J. Smith, CBE, TD.
- Colonel Frank Rennie, CBE, MC-1st Cant, 30th Bn & 37th Bn
- Colonel D.J. Foutaine. DSO, MC, ED.-1st NMWC
- Lieutenant Colonel N.R. Wilson, DSO, MC, VD-1st NWMC
- Lieutenant Colonel F.M. Mitchell, MC.-6th Cant
- Lieutenant Colonel T.B. Morten, DSO, ED.-1st Cant
- Lieutenant Colonel J.R. Williams, DSO.-1st Cant
- Lieutenant Colonel J.B. Mawson MC, ED.-30th Bn
- Major G.H. Gray, MC-1st NMWC
- Major H.H. Thomason, MM-1st NMWC
- Major J.M.C. McLeod MC*-30th Bn
- Major (latter Lt Col), M.C. Stanaway MC-1st NMWC (Awarded in Korea as a captain)
- Captain Starnes, DSO (was recommended for a Victoria Cross, but was immediately awarded the DSO)
- Captain P.W.G. Spiers, MBE, MC, VD-1st NMWC
- Warrant Officer Class II James Godfrey, DCM, MM 13th North Canterbury Regt
- Sergeant E.Batchelor DCM and Bar-23rd Battalion
- Lance Corporal R.J. Burrell, BEM.-2nd CantNMWC
- Private J.D. Ross, MM
- Private H. Anderson, MM
