= USS LST-446 =

1942 LST-1-class tank landing ship

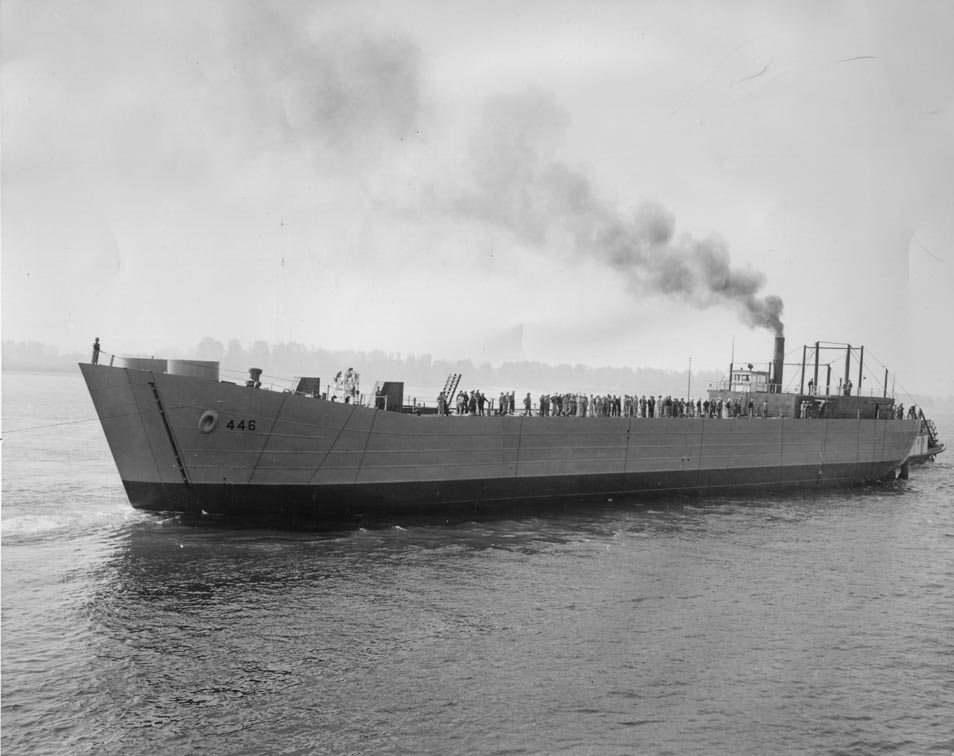
- USS LST-446, launching at Kaiser Shipyards, Vancouver, Washington, 18 September 1942. The pilothouse and smoke stack belong to the paddle-wheel tug at the LSTs stern.

History

United States
- Name: LST-446
- Ordered: as a Type S3-M-K2 hull, MCE hull 966
- Builder: Kaiser Shipbuilding Company, Vancouver, Washington
- Yard number: 150
- Laid down: 15 June 1942
- Launched: 18 September 1942
- Commissioned: 30 November 1942
- Decommissioned: 13 July 1946
- Identification: Hull symbol: LST-446; Code letters: NDWO
- Honors and awards: 6 × battle stars
- Fate: Sold 10 February 1947

United States
- Operator: Suwannee Fruit & Steamship Company, Jacksonville, Florida
- Refit: converted to commercial service
- Status: fate unknown

General characteristics
- Class & type: LST-1-class tank landing ship
- Displacement: 4,080 long tons (4,145 t) full load; 2,160 long tons (2,190 t) landing
- Length: 328 ft (100 m) oa
- Beam: 50 ft (15 m)
- Draft: Full load: 8 ft 2 in (2.49 m) forward; 14 ft 1 in (4.29 m) aft; Landing at 2,160 t: 3 ft 11 in (1.19 m) forward; 9 ft 10 in (3.00 m) aft
- Installed power: 2 × 900 hp (670 kW) Electro-Motive Diesel 12-567A diesel engines; 1,700 shp (1,300 kW)
- Propulsion: 1 × Falk main reduction gears; 2 × Propellers
- Speed: 12 kn (22 km/h; 14 mph)
- Range: 24,000 nmi (44,000 km; 28,000 mi) at 9 kn (17 km/h; 10 mph) while displacing 3,960 long tons (4,024 t)
- Boats & landing craft carried: 2 or 6 x LCVPs
- Capacity: 2,100 tons oceangoing maximum; 350 tons main deckload
- Troops: 16 officers, 147 enlisted men
- Complement: 13 officers, 104 enlisted men
- Armament: Varied, ultimate armament; 2 × twin 40 mm (1.57 in) Bofors guns; 4 × single 40 mm Bofors guns; 12 × 20 mm (0.79 in) Oerlikon cannons

Service record
- Part of: LST Flotilla 5
- Operations: Consolidation of the southern Solomons (11 March–20 April 1943); New Georgia Campaign; New Georgia-Rendova-Vangunu occupation (13–14, 24–25 July and 4–7 August 1943); Vella Lavella occupation (13–19 August 1943); Occupation and defense of Cape Torokina (11 November, 3–4 and 15 December 1943); Bismarck Archipelago operation (15–19 February 1944); Assault and occupation of Guam (21–28 July 1944); Assault and occupation of Okinawa Gunto (1–3 April 1945)
- Awards: Navy Unit Commendation; American Campaign Medal; Asiatic–Pacific Campaign Medal; World War II Victory Medal; Navy Occupation Service Medal w/Asia Clasp

USS LST-446 was a United States Navy LST-1-class tank landing ship used in the Asiatic-Pacific Theater during World War II.

== Construction ==
LST-446 was laid down on 15 June 1942, under Maritime Commission (MARCOM) contract, MC hull 966, by Kaiser Shipyards, Vancouver, Washington; launched on 18 September 1942; and commissioned on 30 November 1942.

== Service history ==
During the war, LST-446 was assigned to the Pacific Theater of Operations. She took part in the consolidation of the southern Solomons from March through April 1943; the New Georgia Campaign which included the New Georgia-Rendova-Vangunu occupation in July and August 1943, and the Vella Lavella occupation in August 1943; the occupation and defense of Cape Torokina November and December 1943; the Green Islands landing February 1944; the assault and occupation of Guam July 1944; and the assault and occupation of Okinawa Gunto April 1945.

== Post-war service ==
Following the war, LST-446 performed occupation duty in the Far East until mid-December 1945. Upon her return to the United States, the tank landing ship was decommissioned on 13 July 1946, and struck from the Navy list on 8 October 1946. On 10 February 1947, she was sold to the Suwannee Fruit & Steamship Co., of Jacksonville, Florida, for conversion to merchant service.

== Honors and awards ==
LST-446 earned six battle stars for her World War II service.

== Notes ==
Citations

== Bibliography ==
Online resources

- "LST-446". Dictionary of American Naval Fighting Ships. Naval History and Heritage Command. This article incorporates text from this source, which is in the public domain.
- "Kaiser Vancouver, Vancouver WA". www.ShipbuildingHistory.com. 27 November 2010.
- "USS LST-446". NavSource. 4 October 2014.
