= USS LST-485 =

1943 LST-1-class tank landing ship

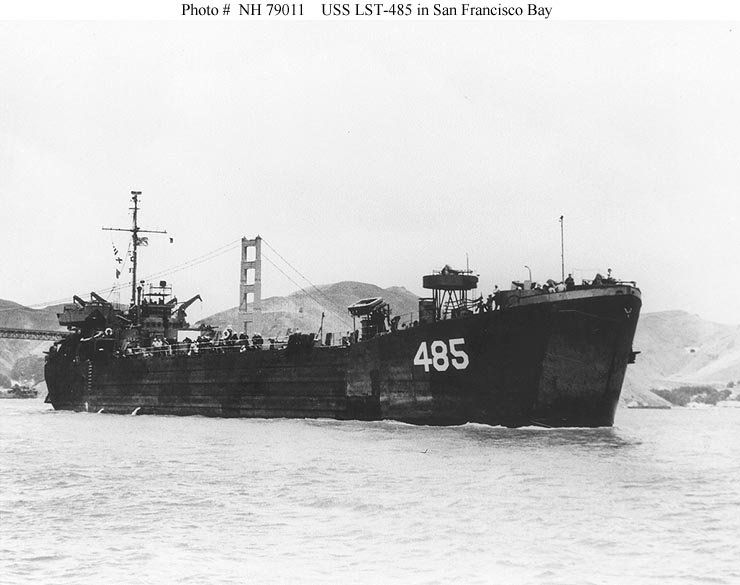
- USS LST-485, underway in San Francisco Bay, California, c. 1946.

History

United States
- Name: LST-485
- Ordered: as a Type S3-M-K2 hull, MCE hull 1005
- Builder: Permanente Metals Corporation, Richmond, California
- Yard number: 40
- Laid down: 17 December 1942
- Launched: 9 January 1943
- Commissioned: 19 May 1943
- Decommissioned: 30 July 1946
- Stricken: 28 August 1946
- Identification: Hull symbol: LST-485; Code letters: NGXB
- Honors and awards: 5 × battle stars
- Fate: Sold for scrap, 29 March 1948

General characteristics
- Class & type: LST-1-class tank landing ship
- Displacement: 4,080 long tons (4,145 t) full load; 2,160 long tons (2,190 t) landing
- Length: 328 ft (100 m) oa
- Beam: 50 ft (15 m)
- Draft: Full load: 8 ft 2 in (2.49 m) forward; 14 ft 1 in (4.29 m) aft; Landing at 2,160 t: 3 ft 11 in (1.19 m) forward; 9 ft 10 in (3.00 m) aft
- Installed power: 2 × 900 hp (670 kW) Electro-Motive Diesel 12-567A diesel engines; 1,700 shp (1,300 kW)
- Propulsion: 1 × Falk main reduction gears; 2 × Propellers
- Speed: 12 kn (22 km/h; 14 mph)
- Range: 24,000 nmi (44,000 km; 28,000 mi) at 9 kn (17 km/h; 10 mph) while displacing 3,960 long tons (4,024 t)
- Boats & landing craft carried: 2 or 6 x LCVPs
- Capacity: 2,100 tons oceangoing maximum; 350 tons main deckload
- Troops: 16 officers, 147 enlisted men
- Complement: 13 officers, 104 enlisted men
- Armament: Varied, ultimate armament; 2 × twin 40 mm (1.57 in) Bofors guns; 4 × single 40 mm Bofors guns; 12 × 20 mm (0.79 in) Oerlikon cannons

Service record
- Part of: LST Flotilla 5
- Operations: Vella-Lavella occupation (18 September 1943); Treasury Island landings (27 October–6 November 1943); Capture and occupation of Saipan (15 June–10 August 1944); Tinian Capture and occupation (24 July–10 August 1944); Assault and occupation of Okinawa Gunto (3 May–20 June 1945)
- Awards: Navy Unit Commendation; American Campaign Medal; Asiatic–Pacific Campaign Medal; China Service Medal; World War II Victory Medal; Navy Occupation Service Medal w/Asia Clasp

USS LST-484 was an LST-1-class tank landing ship built for the United States Navy during World War II.

== Construction ==
LST-485 was laid down on 17 December 1942, under Maritime Commission (MARCOM) contract, MC hull 1005, by Kaiser Shipyards, Yard No. 4, Richmond, California; launched on 9 January 1943; and commissioned on 19 May 1943.

== Service history ==
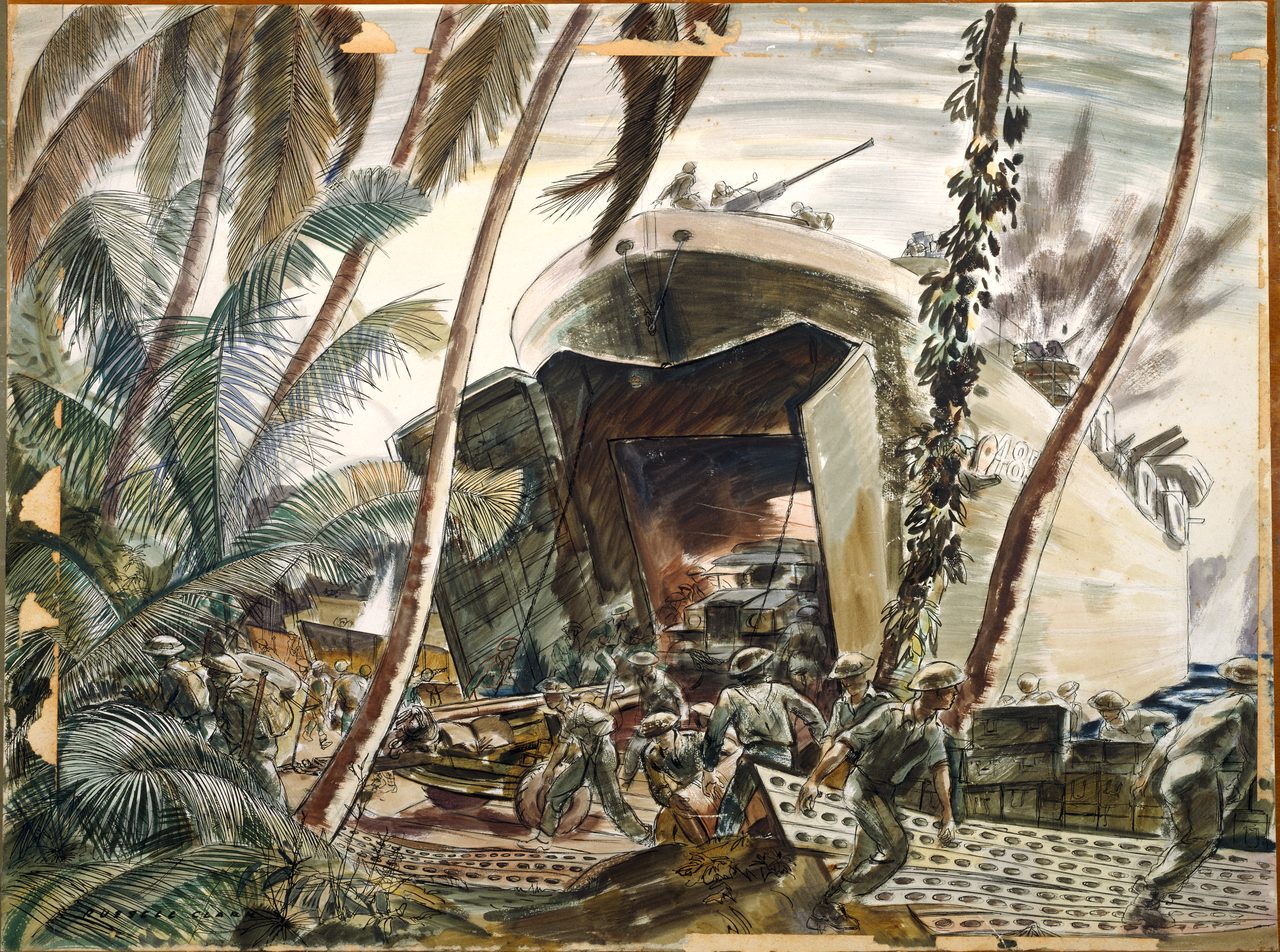
The USS LST-485, depicted in "Landing Ships Under Fire, Treasury Island, 1943", by Russell Clark.

During World War II, LST-485 was assigned to the Asiatic-Pacific Theater and participated in the following operations: the Vella-Lavella occupation in September 1943; the Treasury Island landings in November 1943; the Capture and occupation of Saipan June and August 1944; the Capture and occupation of Tinian in July and August 1944; and the Assault and occupation of Okinawa Gunto from May to June 1945.

== Post-war service ==
Following the war, LST-485 saw China service in January and February 1946, and performed occupation duty in the Far East until early March 1946. Upon her return to the United States, she was decommissioned on 30 July 1946, and struck from the Navy list on 28 August 1946. On 29 March 1948, she was sold to Kaiser Steel, Seattle, Washington, and subsequently scrapped.

== Awards ==
LST-485 earned five battle stars for World War II service.

== Notes ==
Citations

== Bibliography ==
Online resources

- "LST-485". Dictionary of American Naval Fighting Ships. Naval History and Heritage Command. This article incorporates text from this source, which is in the public domain.
- "Kaiser Permanente No. 4, Richmond CA". www.ShipbuildingHistory.com. 5 February 2014.
- "USS LST-485". NavSource. 25 February 2016.
