= Leslie Potter (army officer) =

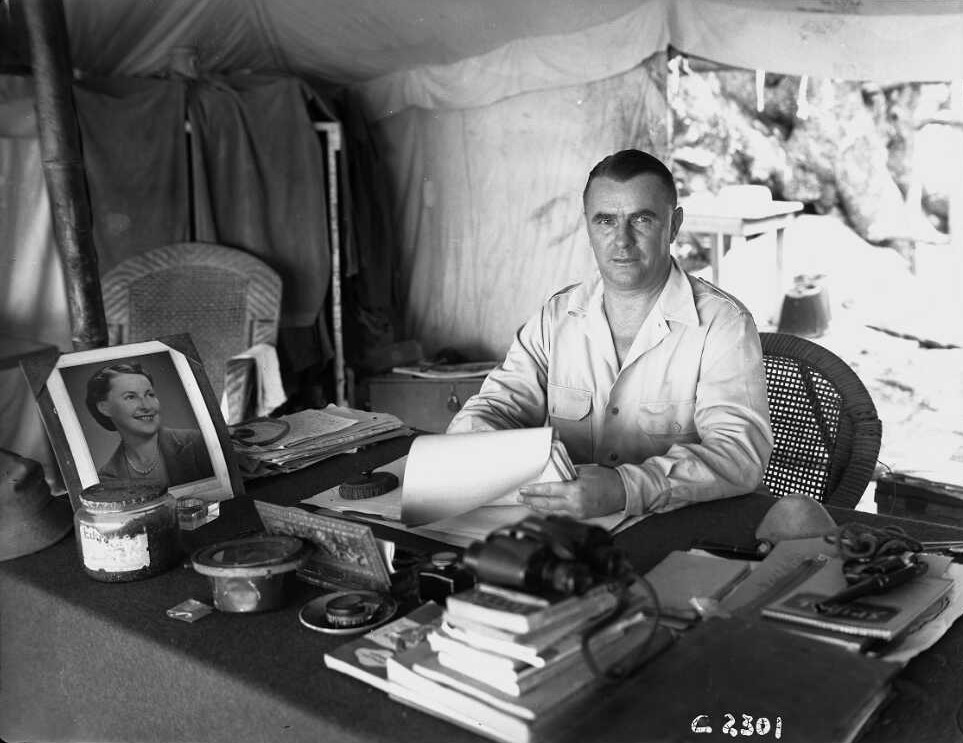
- Leslie Potter, 21 March 1944
- Born: 13 September 1894; Auckland, New Zealand
- Died: 7 March 1964 (aged 69); Tauranga, New Zealand
- Military career
- Allegiance: New Zealand
- Branch: New Zealand Military Forces
- Service years: 1916–1948
- Rank: Brigadier
- Service number: 81777
- Commands: 14th Brigade; 9th Brigade
- Conflicts: First World War; Western Front; Second World War; Battle of Vella Lavella; Battle of the Green Islands
- Awards: Commander of the British Empire; Distinguished Service Order

Brigadier Leslie Potter CBE, DSO (13 September 1894 – 7 March 1964) was an officer of the New Zealand Military Forces who served in both the First and Second World Wars.

== Early life ==
Leslie Potter was born on 13 September 1894 in Auckland, New Zealand. He attended Auckland Grammar School and became captain of the school shooting team in 1911.

== Military career ==
=== First World War ===
Potter entered the Royal Military College, Duntroon in 1913 and graduated in 1915. He sailed overseas with the 16th Reinforcements and joined 2nd Battalion, Otago Regiment on the Western Front. He was wounded at the Battle of Messines in 1917 and later became a staff officer of the 3rd (New Zealand Rifle) Brigade.

=== Interbellum ===
Following the First World War, Potter would continue as a territorial officer in the Auckland Regiment. He went on exchange with the Highland Light Infantry in India from 1926 to 1928 and would later hold a number of staff appointments in New Zealand.

=== Second World War ===
At the outbreak of war Potter held the position of G.S.O.1, Northern Command and in 1940 was appointed commander of the Central Field Force. In December 1941, 14th Brigade was raised for service in the Pacific and Potter was appointed as its commander. 14th Brigade was initially assigned to occupation duties in Fiji, but would eventually see combat in September and October 1943 at the Battle of Vella Lavella and in February 1944 at the Battle of the Green Islands. After the disbandment of 14th Brigade in 1944, Potter would return to New Zealand and was appointed District Commandant of the Central Military District.

=== Post war ===
Potter took over command of J Force, the New Zealand occupation force in Japan, on 6 July 1946 and retained command (except for a period of leave 10 June – 23 September 1947) until the withdrawal of the New Zealand forces in 1948.

== Later life ==
Potter retired to Tauranga in the 1950s. He died on 7 March 1964, and was buried at the Tauranga Anglican Cemetery.

== Honours and awards ==
Potter was appointed a Companion of the Distinguished Service Order on 31 August 1944, for his actions commanding 14th Brigade. The citation reads:

Brigadier Leslie Potter of the 14th NZ Inf Bde has given distinguished service in the field. Brigadier Potter commanded 14th NZ Brigade in the operation at Vella Lavella in September and October 1943 and also the attack and seizure of the Green (Nissan) Island Group. In both operations his sound appreciation of the tactical problems involved and the plans he made for the deployment of his troops contributed largely to the success which attended our arms. In the operations at Vella Lavella the boldness of his initial plan and speed with which he executed it, left the enemy little time to organise his defensive positions and materially lessened the number of our casualties. In both operations he showed marked qualities of leadership. He was throughout in the closest possible touch with his troops and directed their movement with marked success.

Potter was made a Commander of the British Empire in the 1947 King's Birthday Honours.

Order of the British Empire	Distinguished Service Order		British War Medal
Victory Medal	1939–1945 Star	Pacific Star	Defence Medal
War Medal 1939–1945 (MiD)	New Zealand War Service Medal	King George VI Coronation Medal	New Zealand Long and Efficient Service Medal
