= 37th Battalion (New Zealand) =

- Active: 1941–1945
- Country: New Zealand
- Branch: New Zealand Military Forces
- Type: Infantry
- Size: ~700–900 personnel
- Part of: 14th Brigade, 3rd Division
- Engagements: Second World War: Battle of Vella Lavella; Battle of the Green Islands

Insignia
- Distinguishing Patch

The 37th Battalion was an infantry battalion of the New Zealand Military Forces, which served during the Second World War. Attached to the 14th Brigade, New Zealand 3rd Division, the battalion was formed in late 1941 and saw service in the Pacific against the Japanese. They were initially used for garrison duties on Fiji and New Caledonia before being committed to the fighting in the Solomon Islands in 1943. Returned to New Zealand in late 1944, the battalion was disbanded in early 1945 as part of a partial demobilisation of New Zealand forces. Many of its personnel returned to civilian employment while others were sent to Italy as reinforcements for the New Zealand 2nd Division. The battalion was awarded four battle honours for its various engagements during the war.

== History ==
=== Formation ===
The battalion was formed on 29 December 1941 at Burnham Camp, near Christchurch, under the command of Lieutenant Colonel A. H. L. Sugden, (Note: Sugden, who would lead the battalion through its existence, later authored a history of the battalion's service.) a member of the New Zealand Staff Corps, in response to Japan's entry into the war following the bombing of Pearl Harbor and the invasion of Malaya. With the possibility of a Japanese advance south through the Pacific, the New Zealand Government decided to raise a force of three infantry battalions to bolster the garrison in Fiji. The 37th Battalion was one of these units. (Note: The others were the 35th and 36th Battalions.)

The majority of the battalion's other ranks were drawn from men who were originally part of the 8th reinforcement draft, intended to be sent to the Middle East as reinforcements for the New Zealand 2nd Division. Sugden had previously been commandant of the Army School and was familiar with most of the graduates of the recent officer cadet training units. He selected many of these as the battalion's officers while a few other officers were sourced from the 3rd New Zealand Tank Battalion. Upon establishment, the battalion consisted of a headquarters company, three rifle companies and a machine gun/support company.

=== Fiji ===
After less than a month at Burnham, the battalion began moving overseas. In early January 1942 they were sent to Fiji, where they were based at Sambeto, near the airfield at Namaka. Shortly after their arrival, the 37th Battalion became part of the 14th Brigade along with the 30th and 35th Battalions. Later this brigade became part of the New Zealand 3rd Division. The brigade was responsible for defending the Namaka airfield and during its stay on Fiji, the 37th Battalion was tasked as a mobile reserve, the other battalions occupying fixed defensive positions as the island was prepared for a possible Japanese invasion.

By late May 1942, responsibility for the defence of Fiji shifted to the United States with a division arriving in the country. The 148th Infantry Regiment was to take over the positions of the 14th Brigade. While the 30th and 35th Battalions began packing and left the area by late June, the 37th had to wait until more American forces arrived. It was not until 5 August that the battalion boarded the American troopship President Coolidge and departed five days later. The battalion reached Auckland on 13 August and proceeded to Pukekohe where a camp had been established. After a few days, the battalion personnel went on leave for two weeks.

=== Solomon Islands ===
The battalion spent the next several months in training at locations about the central North Island before embarking for New Caledonia in December. Arriving at Nouméa on 31 December 1942, the battalion was earmarked to be the basis for a new brigade, the 15th. However this proved to be only a short-term measure and by March 1943, it was back with 14th Brigade. While on New Caledonia, the battalion underwent jungle training and performed security duties before departing for Guadalcanal in mid-August 1943. After stopping briefly at the New Hebrides, it arrived at Guadalcanal on 27 August and spent a month here, establishing camps and conducting patrols to monitor for any surprise landings by the Japanese.

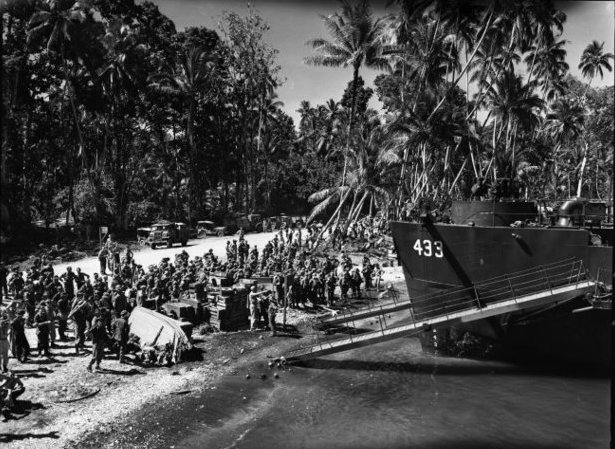
Soldiers of 3rd New Zealand Division loading 'Landing Craft, Infantry' ships on Vella Lavella, in preparation for landing at Nissan Island, 1944

In mid-September, the 37th Battalion departed for the island of Vella Lavella, west of Guadalcanal. The southern part of the island was held by the United States Army while the Japanese continued to hold coastal positions in the north. The battalion landed on the island on 18 September and four days later, it struck out for the north. A series of amphibious landings along the eastern side of the island was planned while the 35th Battalion did the same around the western side.

After an initial landing was made on 21 September at Paraso Bay and the area secured over the next two days, the New Zealanders moved to Doveli Cove and then onto Boro. On 27 September, there was contact by two platoons with a group of Japanese that landed at Tambana Point from a small ship. As a result of this action, 14 Japanese were killed and the ship was captured, for the loss of two soldiers. When the Japanese onshore attempted to attack the ship, this was beaten off and the survivors pursued and killed. (Note: Lieutenant S. J. Bartos was awarded the Military Cross for his part in this action.) There were further actions on 5 and 6 October at Warambari Bay which resulted in three personnel being killed in action. (Note: One death was that of an officer leading a patrol that made contact with a Japanese position on 6 October; Corporal L. N. Dunlea was awarded the Distinguished Conduct Medal for retrieving the body under heavy fire. Private A. McCullough was awarded the Military Medal for his actions the previous day when, during the landing at Warambari Bay, he continued fighting despite wounds to both hands and a foot.) On 8 October the 37th Battalion linked up with the 35th Battalion on the northern coast, completing the clearing of the island of Japanese. Evidence from the beaches suggested that the last of the Japanese had been evacuated on the evening of 6 October.

Both the 35th and 37th Battalions remained on the island performing garrison duty for the next few months. It initially set up company camps along the northern coastline to keep watch for any attempts to land Japanese from nearby islands. They were largely free from interference from the Japanese although in December a transport barge was strafed by American fighter planes in an incident of friendly fire. Two of the battalion's soldiers died as a result.

In mid-February 1944, the 37th Battalion, as part of 14th Brigade, was involved in the Battle of the Green Islands, codenamed Operation Squarepeg. The aim was to secure an airfield for use in further advances in the Solomon Islands. On 15 February, the battalion was landed on the western side of Nissan Island, largely a coral reef, along with 35th Battalion. The 30th Battalion was landed on the eastern side of the island; collectively, the landings were the largest amphibious operation mounted by New Zealand forces in the war. Although the Japanese were present on the island, the landing was unopposed. Initially positioned to the north of the island's airstrip, it later moved to the village of Sior. Although the Japanese were reported to be in the south of the island, the battalion still carried out patrols to ensure none were still in their sector. Later in the month, soldiers from the battalion carried out landings on Sau, a small island to the northeast of Nissan Island, to deal with Japanese there. Four were wounded in exchanges of gunfire but this operation effectively ended any meaningful Japanese resistance in the area. With Nissan Island secure by 28 February, the battalion switched to a defensive mode of operations, monitoring for Japanese counterattacks and assisting in the building of the facilities necessary to allow the island to be used for air and sea operations.

=== Disbandment ===
In early January 1944, in order to rectify a shortage of labour in the primary production sector of the country's economy, the New Zealand government, in consultation with the United States and the United Kingdom, decided that it was necessary to release manpower from the military back into the civilian workforce. After some debate, it was decided that this manpower would come from the 3rd Division, while the 2nd New Zealand Division, which was fighting in Italy, would be allowed to remain intact.

Accordingly, the 3rd Division received orders to begin repatriating personnel back to New Zealand in April 1944 and shortly a first group of 1,800 soldiers from the division left the Pacific region. However, the 37th Battalion remained on Nissan Island until 15 June 1944 at which time it boarded the American cargo ship Rotanin for New Caledonia. It remained in New Caledonia for several weeks and during this time, most of the battalion's long serving personnel returned to New Zealand with the rest following in August. Over the next several weeks, the men of the battalion dispersed into civilian life or to Italy to join the 2nd New Zealand Division. The remnants of the battalion was disbanded at Papakura Military Camp in February 1945.

== Honours ==
During the war, the 37th Battalion lost nine men killed in action, while two others died on active service. A total of 1,150 men are listed on the battalion's nominal roll. (Note: Among the battalion's personnel was Robert Muldoon, the future Prime Minister of New Zealand.) Three gallantry medals were awarded to personnel of the battalion; one soldier received the Distinguished Conduct Medal, an officer was awarded the Military Cross while another soldier received the Military Medal. Four personnel, including Sugden, were mentioned in despatches and the battalion's quartermaster was appointed a member of the Order of the British Empire.

For its service in the war, the 37th Battalion received four battle honours: "Solomons", "Vella Lavella", "Green Islands", and "South Pacific 1942–44". In 1957, these honours were passed to the battalion's successor units: the Canterbury Regiment, the Otago and Southland Regiment and the Nelson, Marlborough and West Coast Regiment.

== Notes ==
Footnotes

Citations
