= 14th Brigade (New Zealand) =

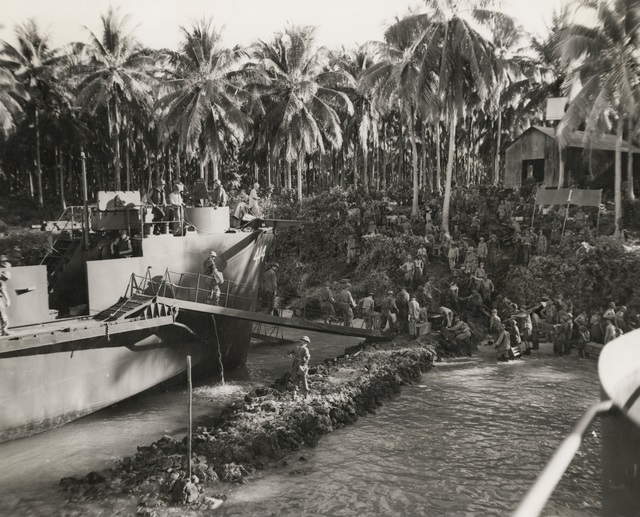
- Troops from New Zealand disembark from U.S. Landing Craft Infantry ship LCI-444 to occupy Green Island on 16 February 1944.
- Active: 1941–1944
- Country: New Zealand
- Branch: New Zealand Military Forces
- Type: Infantry
- Size: ~3,000 – 3,500 personnel
- Part of: 3rd Division
- Engagements: Second World War: Land Battle of Vella Lavella; Battle of the Green Islands

Commanders
- Notable commanders: Leslie Potter

The 14th Brigade was a formation of the New Zealand Military Forces, which served during the Second World War as part of the 2nd New Zealand Expeditionary Force. Eventually forming part of the 3rd Division, the brigade served in the Pacific Ocean theatre of the war. Raised in December 1941, the brigade undertook garrison duties in Fiji before being relieved by US troops in mid-1942. After this, it took part in two combat actions against Japanese forces in 1943–1944: the Land Battle of Vella Lavella and the Battle of the Green Islands. In mid-1944, the brigade was broken up to return manpower to New Zealand industry and to meet the reinforcement needs of the 2nd Division in Italy.

== History ==
The brigade's headquarters was raised in December 1941 at Trentham Military Camp, and initially the brigade was employed on garrison duties on Fiji. Its first and only commander was Brigadier Leslie Potter. Raised after the 8th Brigade, the 14th was the second of the division's three brigades – although the third, the 15th, was disbanded shortly after being raised due to manpower constraints – the brigade consisted of three infantry battalions: the 30th, the 35th and 37th.

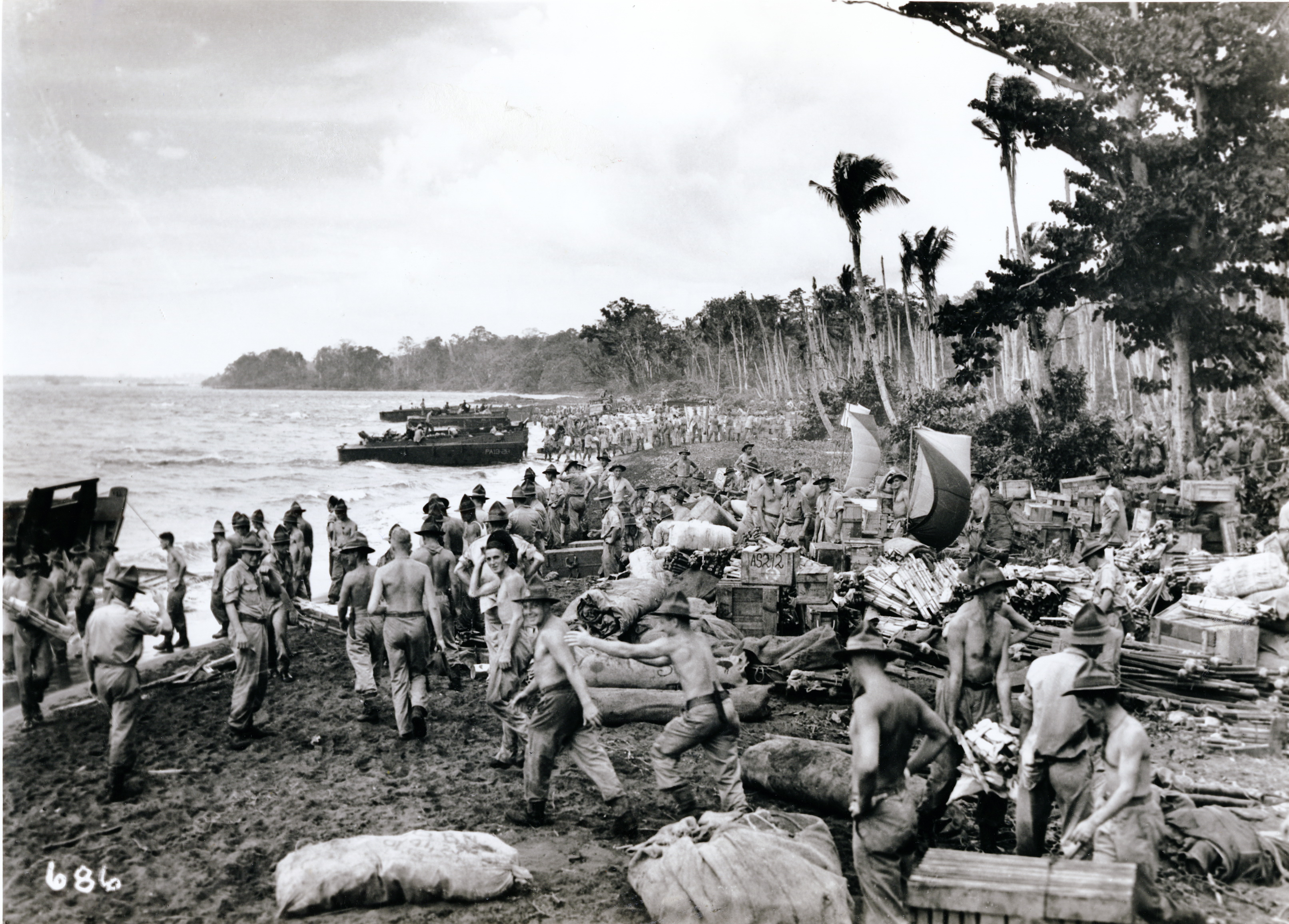
14th Brigade landing at Guadalcanal

In mid-1942, as US forces began arriving on Fiji, the brigade returned to New Zealand. After a period of training in New Zealand, the brigade departed for New Caledonia in December 1942. Further training took place there and on Guadalcanal as the 3rd Division was given a combat role within the Solomon Islands campaign. In September 1943, the brigade was committed to its first combat action, landing on Vella Lavella and fighting a short, but sharp engagement against the Japanese garrison. The brigade remained there until it took part in its next landing on the Nissan Islands, in what became known as the Battle of the Green Islands in February 1944.

By mid-1944, the New Zealand Army was experiencing a manpower shortage. As it became clear that the nation could not support both the 3rd Division in the Pacific and the 2nd Division in Italy, as well as meet the needs of industry back in New Zealand, the brigade was withdrawn back to New Caledonia, where the 3rd Division was being concentrated while its future was being decided. Slowly personnel were demobilised and returned to New Zealand and by August 1944, the 14th Brigade ceased to exist. A short time later, on 20 October 1944, the 3rd Division, along with its various subunits, was disbanded.
