= 30th Battalion (New Zealand) =

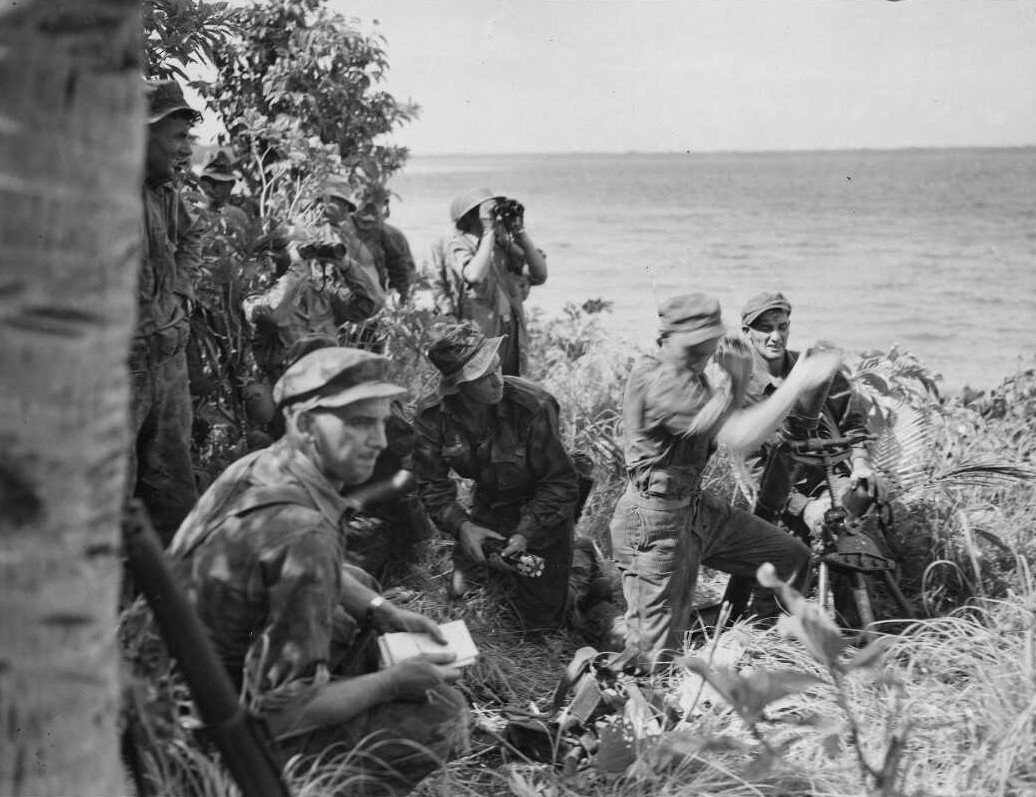
- Mortar crew of 30th Battalion firing at Japanese barges on Nissan Island
- Active: 1940–1944
- Country: New Zealand
- Branch: New Zealand Military Forces
- Type: Infantry
- Size: ~700–900 personnel
- Part of: 14th Brigade, 3rd Division
- Engagements: Second World War: Land Battle of Vella Lavella; Battle of the Green Islands

Insignia
- Distinguishing Patch

The 30th Battalion was an infantry battalion of the New Zealand 3rd Division, raised for service during the Second World War. After being raised in late 1940, the battalion undertook garrison duties in Fiji and on New Caledonia during the early part of the war, before undertaking combat operations during the latter part of the Solomon Islands campaign, landing on Vella Lavella and the Green Islands in 1943–1944. The battalion was disbanded in mid-1944 to return manpower to the New Zealand economy and to provide reinforcements to the New Zealand 2nd Division, which was fighting in Italy.

== History ==
Formed in September 1940, and drawing personnel from the Canterbury and Otago districts, the 30th Battalion was initially assigned to the 8th Brigade, before eventually becoming part of the 14th Brigade, which served in the Pacific. Shortly after its establishment, the battalion undertook garrison duties on Fiji to defend against a possible Japanese attack, before handing over to US troops.

Service on New Caledonia followed before the 3rd Division concentrated on Guadalcanal in August 1943. As the Solomon Islands campaign progressed, the 3rd Division was given a combat role, and the 30th Battalion took part in its first combat operation of the war, landing on Vella Lavella in September 1943. In February 1944, the 30th fought another battle against the Japanese, this time on Nissan Island. In mid-1944, amidst a manpower shortage in New Zealand, the battalion returned to New Zealand and was broken up to return personnel to civilian industry and to provide reinforcements for the New Zealand 2nd Division, fighting in Italy.

Over 2,000 personnel served in the battalion throughout the war. Of these, three were killed in action, two died of wounds, 10 were wounded in action and three died of illness or in accidents. Members of the battalion received the following decorations: one Distinguished Service Order, one Distinguished Conduct Medal, two Military Medals, and three Mentioned in Despatches. One US Legion of Honor was also awarded. For their service, the 30th Battalion received four battle honours: "Solomons", "Vella Lavella", "Green Islands", and "South Pacific 1942–44". In 1957, these honours were passed to the battalion's successor units: the Canterbury Regiment, the Otago and Southland Regiment, and the Nelson, Marlborough and West Coast Regiment.

== Commanding officers ==
The following officers commanded the 30th Battalion during the war:

- Lieutenant Colonel J. B. Mawson
- Lieutenant Colonel J. Irving
- Lieutenant Colonel H. A. Pattullo
- Lieutenant Colonel S. A. McNamara
