= Battle of the Green Islands =

1944 battle

Coordinates: 4°30′S 154°10′E

- Part of Operation Cartwheel
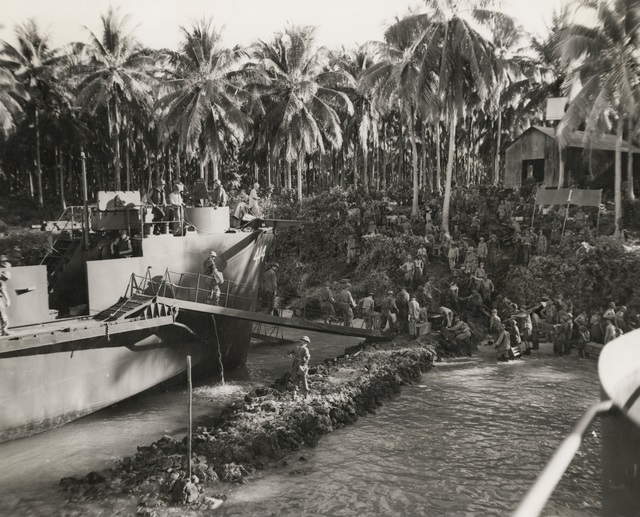
- Troops from New Zealand disembark from US Landing Craft Infantry ship LCI-444 to occupy Green Island on 16 February 1944.
Date	15–20 February 1944
Location	Green Islands in the South Pacific
Result	Allied victory

Belligerents
New Zealand	Japan

Commanders and leaders
(Dominion of New Zealand) Harold Barrowclough	(Empire of Japan) Hitoshi Imamura (Empire of Japan) Kyuma Wada †

Strength
5,806	102

Casualties and losses
13 killed 26 wounded 1 cruiser damaged	Almost all killed 12 aircraft destroyed

The Battle of the Green Islands or Operation Squarepeg was fought from 15 to 20 February 1944, between Imperial Japan and Allied forces from the New Zealand 3rd Division and the United States. Undertaken after landings to secure lodgments on New Britain and Bougainville, the main focus of the operation was the capture of Nissan Island, which was secured by New Zealand forces after only a short ground campaign. At only very limited cost in terms of casualties, the Allied operation resulted in the capture of several small atolls in the island chain, which were subsequently used to support air and naval operations focused on reducing the main Japanese base on Rabaul.

== Background ==
The Green Islands, consisting of several small coral atolls, are located between Bougainville and New Ireland, about 150 miles (240 km) from Rabaul, which was the location of the main Japanese base in the area. At the time of the battle, they were part of the Australian Territory of New Guinea and were populated by around 1,200 Melanesians. The atolls form a rough circle, with the main island, Nissan, forming a west-facing crescent shape closed off by several smaller islands separated from the main landmass by small passages that open up into a large internal lagoon roughly 4 nautical miles (7.4 km; 4.6 mi) in width. The islands were initially garrisoned by 12 watchkeepers from the Imperial Japanese Navy and about 80 Imperial Japanese Army personnel from Hitoshi Imamura's Eighth Area Army.

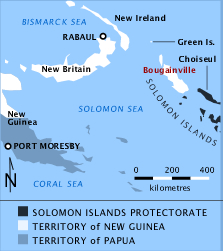
Location of the Green Islands

In the wake of landings at Cape Gloucester and Cape Torokina on New Britain and Bougainville, the Allies sought to continue their offensive operations in the region, as part of the advance towards the Japanese base around Rabaul, prior to launching the Admiralty Islands campaign. The Green Islands were subsequently identified as being close enough to fighter cover provided by aircraft based at Torokina, while offering the prospect of projecting Allied air and naval power further towards Rabaul.

On 30 January 300 troops from the New Zealand 30th Infantry Battalion, along with American and New Zealand intelligence and communications personnel, were landed on Nissan Island. Escorted by a small naval force including several destroyer escorts, motor torpedo boats and landing craft, the party was tasked with determining the strength of the Japanese there as well as siting landing beaches and determining prospects for base development. The reconnaissance party remained ashore for 24 hours, during which contact was established with the native population who provided intelligence, and several patrols were sent out to survey the ground and determine the dispositions of the local garrison. On January 31 the Japanese watchkeepers reported the enemy had landed, burning their codebooks in the evening and fleeing for the Feni Islands the following day. During this time, there were several minor skirmishes which resulted in four killed and five wounded, before the force was withdrawn by sea to Vella Lavella.

In response to the landings, the Imperial Japanese Navy's 8th Base Force ordered 123 men to be dispatched via submarines to conduct a counter-landing. The submarines departed Rabaul on 1 February, reaching the Green Islands at 0300 hours on 3 February. Under the poor weather conditions, only a total of 77 men (26 men from the 86th Guard Unit and 51 Takasago Volunteers) commanded by IJN Lieutenant Kyuma Wada were able to land. Some of the watchkeepers later returned and by 15 February Wada reported a total of 102 men were under his command.

== Operation ==
Under the command of Admiral William Halsey Jr., the invasion of the islands commenced on 15 February 1944, codenamed "Operation Squarepeg". Staging out of Vella Lavella and the Treasury Islands, Allied forces invaded several islands, including Nissan Island, and recaptured them from heavily outnumbered Japanese forces (estimated at around 120 to 150 strong). The main ground combat elements came from the three infantry battalions of the New Zealand 14th Brigade, of Major General Harold Barrowclough's 3rd New Zealand Division.

Allied infantry were transported aboard US Navy high-speed transport (APDs). These were escorted by a strong naval task force of destroyers, minesweepers and motor torpedo boats, under the command of Rear Admiral Theodore Wilkinson, while American LSTs landed the 3rd NZ Division Special Army Tank Squadron's Valentine tanks. Logistical support was provided by several Seabee battalions (the 33rd, 37th and 93rd), as well as various other naval base and survey units. A US coastal artillery battalion was also landed to provide anti-aircraft defence, as were armoured, engineer, artillery, medical and other divisional logistic support units from the New Zealand 3rd Division.

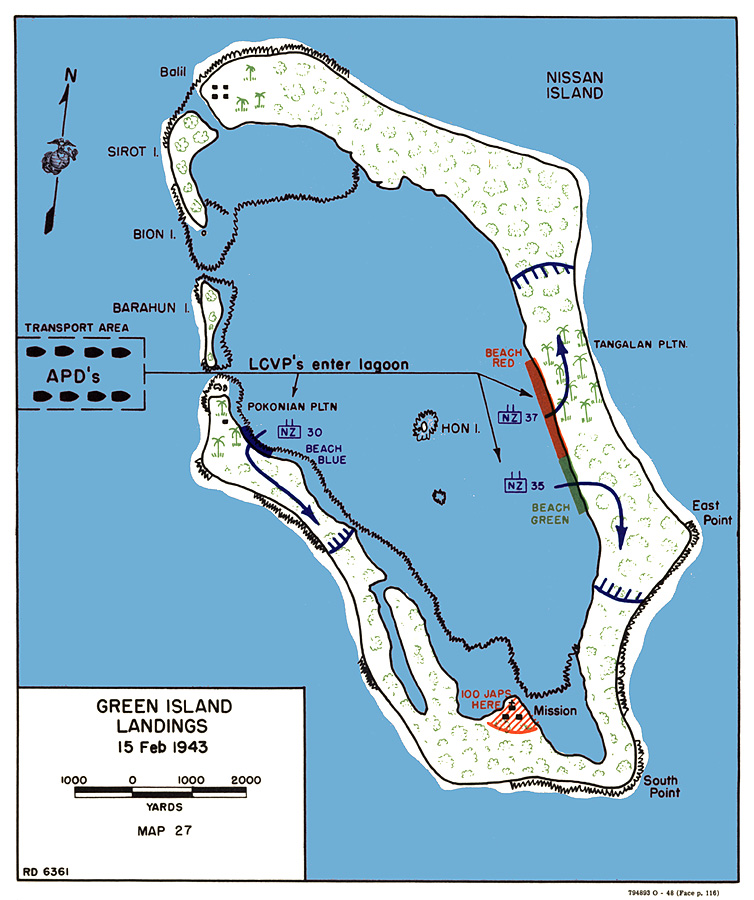
Map of the landing, 15 February 1944

The fighting was brief but sharp on land with heavier resistance in the air. Prior to the landing, as the assault force steamed towards the islands, a large group of Japanese aircraft were dispatched from Rabaul to attack the naval task force. The landing craft and transports escaped damage, but the cruiser St. Louis, which formed part of the southern covering force, was hit resulting in 23 killed and 28 wounded. Later, a group of dive bombers appeared over the landing craft as they were forming up to the west of the islands, but the Japanese aircraft were promptly dealt with by the escorting AirSols fighters from Cape Torokina, which quickly gained control of the air over Nissan Island. In all, the Japanese lost 12 aircraft. Apart from a near miss on LST-446, the landing proceeded quickly and smoothly. After being crossloaded from the transports, the infantry were ferried ashore in LCIs and LCP(R)s, which proceeded to enter the lagoon to the south of Barahun Island. Troops disembarked at several landing beaches around the Pokonian and Tangalan Plantations. In total 5,800 personnel were landed on 15 February, of which over 4,200 were New Zealanders.

As the beachhead was established, there was only a brief resistance from several Japanese barges around Sirot Island, before a perimeter was established. Elaborate measures were implemented to defend against a potential counterattack from Rabaul. Patrols were sent out, and carrying parties began moving stores off the beaches further inland. A brigade headquarters was established around Tangalan Plantation, while Barrowclough's divisional headquarters was set up around Pokonian. The perimeter was held throughout the night. On 16 February, the New Zealand infantrymen began to push inland across the island. The 30th Infantry Battalion cleared the eastern side of the island around the Pokonian Plantation, while the 37th cleared the northern area of the island from Tangalan Plantation, the 35th pushed south. Each infantry battalion was supported by a troop of Valentine tanks, which provided close support and helped clear tracks through the jungle. On the morning of 17 February, the Japanese Commander Wada reported frequent mortar fire towards his positions.

A series of minor patrol actions took place in the 30th Battalion's area of responsibility, while a group of around 70 Japanese was encountered around a Catholic mission around the southern end of the island near Tanaheran, having become caught between patrols from both the 30th and 35th Battalions. This group of Japanese were overwhelmed over the course of several days by New Zealand infantry, supported by several tanks, at the cost of three killed and 11 wounded, while 62 Japanese were killed. On 19 February at 0500 hours Wada issued a final telegram stating "We will storm the enemy's positions, cutting off communications." The island was finally secured by Allied forces the following day. On 23 February, the final action of the campaign took place when a company-sized patrol from the 37th Battalion cleared the small island of Sau, where 14 Japanese survivors had withdrawn. After refusing a call to surrender, the small Japanese force was destroyed in a brief firefight that resulted in four New Zealanders being wounded. On 24 February the 8th Base Force reported the Green Islands garrison had been annihilated.

Overall casualties for the entire operation amounted 13 killed and 26 wounded for the Allies, while almost all of the Japanese garrison was killed.

== Base development ==
Base development was the responsibility of the Seabees of the 22nd Naval Construction Regiment. This was activated on 15 January 1944 and consisted of the 15th, 3rd, 37th and 93rd Naval Construction Battalions. At the time, the 15th and 93rd were in the Russell Islands, the 33rd was en route there from New Zealand, and the 37th was at Ondonga Airfield on New Georgia. Units of the 22nd Naval Construction Regiment began moving to the Green Islands on 15 February 1944. Work commenced on the airstrip on 20 February. By 6 March, a 5,000-foot (1,500 m) long and 150-foot (46 m) airstrip was in operation, and fighters based there attacked targets in Kavieng and New Ireland. Work continued on roads, taxiways, hardstands and base facilities, and a 6,000-by-150-foot (1,829 by 46 m) bomber strip was completed by the end of the month. The work was hampered by bad weather, the need to clear away large trees and dense foliage, and the presence of rocks that required blasting. Coral used for the surfacing was obtained from distant quarries and then had to be transported to the airstrips. The airbase was supported by a fourteen-tank aviation gasoline farm.

The airstrips became home to United States Marine Corps fighters and bombers which participated in the Allied effort to isolate the Japanese bases on Rabaul and Kavieng, while New Zealand fighters also used the base to refuel during operations over Rabaul. A South Pacific Combat Air Transport Command (SCAT) detachment, which supplied materiel and mail to combat soldiers and evacuated the wounded, was also established on the island. Lieutenant Richard Nixon, who later became President of the United States, served as the officer-in-charge of the SCAT detachment on the Green Islands in early 1944. Other base facilities included a 450-by-250-foot (137 by 76 m) coral seaplane ramp, and three moorings with concrete anchors and oil drum buoys. A fuel pier was constructed, and an entire PT boat base with camps, workshops, a steel warehouse, and a T-shaped pontoon pier. Medical facilities were provided for a naval base hospital with four Quonset huts. Due to food shortages on the island as it was built up as a base by the Allies, a group of 1,147 natives were transferred from the island to Guadalcanal in March 1944.

When airstrips on Emirau Island were opened in May 1944, the importance of Nissan Island was reduced as aircraft were transferred there. Base construction was considered complete by July 1944, and responsibility for the installations was handed over to Construction Battalion Maintenance Units (CBMU) 552 and 553. They began dismantling the base in late 1944. CBMU 552 left in March 1945, but CBMU 553 remained until August 1945.
