= Robert Row (New Zealand soldier) =

NZ Army officer (1888-1959)

Robert Amos Row
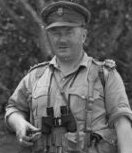
- Born: 30 July 1888; Christchurch, New Zealand
- Died: 7 January 1959 (aged 70); Lower Hutt, New Zealand
- Military career
- Allegiance: New Zealand
- Branch: New Zealand Army
- Service years: 1909–1944
- Rank: Brigadier
- Commands: 8th Brigade
- Conflicts: First World War; Gallipoli campaign; Western Front; Second World War; German invasion of Greece; North African campaign; Battle of the Treasury Islands
- Awards: Distinguished Service Order & Bar; Legion of Merit

Brigadier Robert Amos Row, DSO & Bar (30 July 1888 –7 January 1959) was a senior officer in the New Zealand Military Forces and a two-time recipient of the Distinguished Service Order. He served in the New Zealand Expeditionary Force during the First World War, commanding an infantry battalion. In the Second World War, he commanded the 8th Brigade during the Battle of the Treasury Islands.

== Early life ==
Robert Amos Row was born in Christchurch, New Zealand, on 30 July 1888. He was educated at Christchurch Boys' High School and then went onto Canterbury College. After completing his education, he worked as a commercial traveler.

In 1909, Row joined New Zealand's volunteer militia and served in the Imperial Rifles. When the Territorial Force was formed two years later, he enlisted in the 1st (Canterbury) Regiment. Already an experienced officer from his service in the militia, he was soon promoted to the rank of major.

== First World War ==
On the outbreak of the First World War, Row volunteered for service in the New Zealand Expeditionary Force (NZEF) and was appointed commander of the 1st Canterbury Company of the Canterbury Infantry Battalion. Along with the rest of the company, he embarked for the Middle East on 16 October 1914 aboard the Tahiti. He served in the Gallipoli campaign in 1915, during which he was wounded. Evacuated to Malta for treatment, he did not return to the frontlines until early 1917, by which time the New Zealanders were serving on the Western Front.

Promoted to lieutenant colonel, he commanded the 3rd Battalion of the Canterbury Regiment during the Battle of Messines and was later awarded the Distinguished Service Order (DSO) in recognition of his services in Flanders, the citation noting his leadership during fighting around Ploegsteert Wood. Early the following year, the 3rd Battalion was converted to a pioneer unit and he was temporarily placed in command of the 1st Battalion of the Canterbury Regiment. During the German spring offensive of 1918, Row was attached to brigade headquarters in a liaison role, resuming his battalion command towards the end of the year during the battles of the Hundred Days Offensive.

By the end of the war, he had been mentioned in despatches three times. He was presented with his DSO from King George V in a ceremony at Buckingham Palace on 13 February 1919. He was discharged from the NZEF in May 1919.

== Interwar period ==
At the end of the war Row took on professional soldiering and joined the New Zealand Staff Corps, a branch of the New Zealand Military Forces which assisted in the administration of the New Zealand Territorial Force. For the next several years, he held a series of staff positions, beginning with an attachment to the General Headquarters School at Trentham Military Camp. From 1933 to 1939, he served as a staff officer at Central Command in Wellington.

== Second World War ==
As a professional soldier with staff experience, in the Second World War Row was posted to the headquarters of the Second New Zealand Expeditionary Force (2NZEF) and served in the Middle East from January 1941. During the Battle of Greece, he was temporarily attached to Anzac Corps headquarters. He returned to Army Headquarters in New Zealand in June 1941 as tensions with the Japanese Empire escalated in the Pacific region. Soon after Japan's entry into the war, Row was appointed commander of the 8th Brigade.

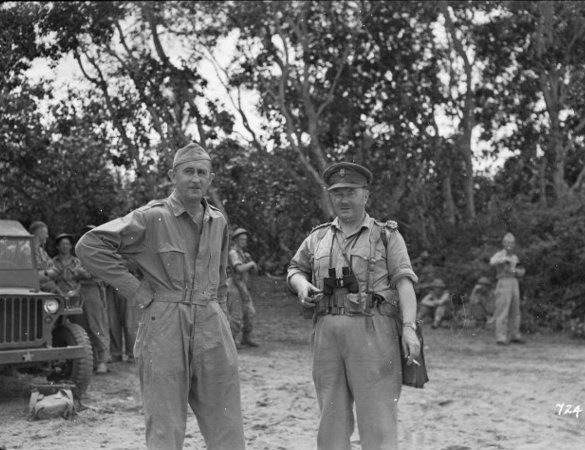
Brigadier Robert Row (right) with Brigadier General Neal C. Johnson of the US Army, Solomon Islands, 1943

At the time, 8th Brigade was stationed in Fiji having been sent there in late 1940 to guard against a possible attack in the event Japan entered the war and attacked the island nation. Shortly after taking command, Row implemented a test of his unit by holding an exercise under the guise of a Japanese invasion. This uncovered a variety of equipment and training deficiencies in the brigade. The brigade remained in Fiji in a defensive role until August 1942, when they returned to New Zealand and undertook home defence duties as part of the newly formed 3rd Division, under the command of Major General Harold Barrowclough.

In August 1943, the 3rd New Zealand Division was assigned a role in the ongoing Solomon Islands campaign, which was being directed by Vice Admiral William Halsey, the overall commander of Allied forces in the South Pacific area. Row's brigade did not participate in the first action the New Zealanders were involved in, the Battle of Vella Lavella. However, it played the major role in the following month's Battle of the Treasury Islands. The Treasuries, which consisted of two main islands, Mono and Stirling, were to the south of the larger island of Bougainville and were seen by the Allies as a stepping-stone towards landing forces there. The operation would be the first amphibious landing mounted under fire by New Zealand forces since the Gallipoli landing in 1915.

For the battle, Row's brigade was detached from the 3rd Division and placed under the operational command of the US 1st Marine Amphibious Corps. In addition to the three battalions of his brigade, Row had under his command US combat support and service support units including a naval construction battalion (the 87th), a signals unit, a naval base unit, and a coastal artillery battalion (the 198th) to provide anti-aircraft fire support. Having US personnel under foreign command was unusual for the Second World War and was a reflection of Halsey's confidence in Row's leadership.

Row's preparations for the Treasuries landings suffered from a lack of shipping, which was prioritised for the upcoming landings on Bougainville but despite this, on 27 October, the brigade's 29th and 36th Battalions landed on the south coast of Mono Island, while 34th Battalion landed on the much smaller Stirling Island while a company from 34th Battalion and US construction engineers landed on the north coast on Mono to establish a radar base there. The troops landing in the south of Mono experienced defensive fire but by midday had destroyed the artillery present there and were penetrating inland. Those landing at Stirling were unopposed and Row subsequently established his headquarters there; the Japanese garrison on the island had moved across to Mono. By the end of the day it was clear that the landings had been a success, achieved with few casualties. Over the next few days, the Japanese retreating from the south began attacking the defensive perimeter that had been established around the northern landing site. A heavy attack was fended off on the night of 1 November and after this, organised resistance by the Japanese faded away and Mono Island was considered secure by 12 November. The 8th Brigade remained in the Treasuries as a garrison force, having lost 40 men killed and another 145 wounded. They had killed 223 Japanese during the landings and occupation; eight prisoners of war were secured.

Despite the success of the Treasuries landings, Row was returned to New Zealand in December 1943, as part of Barrowclough's organisational strategy of replacing the older commanders within the 3rd Division with younger officers. Row's removal as commander of 8th Brigade came as a surprise to Halsey, who had established a good working relationship with him. He requested Barrowclough keep him informed of future changes in senior personnel in the 3rd Division. Row was rewarded for his leadership during the Battle of the Treasury Islands with a bar to his DSO. He was also awarded the United States Legion of Merit.

== Later life ==
No longer required for active service in the New Zealand Military Forces, Row was placed on the retired list in 1944. He died at the age of 70 in Lower Hutt on 7 January 1959.
