= 34th Battalion (New Zealand) =

- Active: 1940–1944
- Country: New Zealand
- Branch: New Zealand Military Forces
- Type: Infantry
- Size: ~700–900 personnel
- Part of: 8th Brigade, 3rd Division
- Engagements: Second World War: Battle of the Treasury Islands

Insignia
- Distinguishing Patch

The 34th Battalion was an infantry battalion of the New Zealand Military Forces, which served during the Second World War. Formed in Fiji in late 1940, it saw service in the Pacific against the Japanese.

The 34th Battalion was initially used for garrison duties on Fiji and New Caledonia before being committed to the fighting in the Solomon Islands, briefly seeing combat against the Japanese in the Treasury Islands in late 1943. Returned to New Zealand in mid-1944 and was disbanded later that year as part of a partial demobilisation of New Zealand forces. Many of its personnel returned to civilian employment while others were sent to Italy as reinforcements for the New Zealand 2nd Division. The battalion was awarded three battle honours for its service during the war.

== History ==
=== Formation ===
Anticipating the entry of the Japanese Empire into the Second World War, in September 1940 the New Zealand Military Forces raised the 8th Infantry Brigade Group for garrison duty in Fiji. Prior to the outbreak of the Second World War, it had been considered by the British Overseas Defence Committee that New Zealand would assume responsibility for the defence of Fiji, which was incapable of defending itself, in the event of war. The brigade group, made up of the 29th and 30th Battalions, arrived in Fiji in early November 1940. Shortly after the brigade group landed in Fiji, a further contingent of reinforcements arrived on 22 November 1940. It was intended that these would be distributed amongst the existing battalions. However, on arrival at Suva, Brigadier William Cunningham, the brigade commander, directed that a new battalion be formed from the reinforcements. This was to be the basis of the 34th Battalion.

Originally designated simply as Training Battalion, it was under the command of Major Francis Voelcker. The battalion was based at Samambula Camp where it would undergo training for the next several months. In May 1941, the bulk of the battalion's personnel returned to New Zealand and onwards to the Middle East to join the 2nd New Zealand Division. Fourteen soldiers volunteered for duty as coast watchers in the Gilbert and Ellice Islands and consequently left the battalion. (Note: These volunteers were later captured and executed by the Japanese in 1942.) Some others, including Voelcker who had been promoted to lieutenant colonel, remained in Fiji to form the cadre around which the battalion was to be reformed with newly arrived personnel. The battalion, now known as Reserve Battalion, resumed training and garrison duty. Many personnel had only received minimal military training in New Zealand before being shipped to Fiji and much time had to be spent on the basics of warfare and tactics.

Towards the end of 1941 the likelihood of hostilities commencing in the Pacific increased, so the battalion began work on defence emplacements in their sector along the coast. Coincidentally manning their defence emplacements on a training exercise when news of the Japanese attack on Pearl Harbor reached Fiji, extra supplies of ammunition were immediately handed out and the battalion remained on action stations for three days before being stood down. Training was stepped up in preparation for action against the Japanese and in late December 1941, the battalion was formally designated 34th Battalion. By now it was up to full strength having received a draft of reinforcements from New Zealand.

To supplement the defences of Fiji, the brigade group was reinforced from New Zealand with the 14th Brigade. (Note: The 14th Brigade was made up of the 30th Battalion, which was transferred from the 8th Brigade, and the 35th and 37th Battalions.) The 34th Battalion continued performing garrison duties and carrying out training exercises until, with the United States now taking responsibility for the defence of Fiji, it was relieved by American forces in July 1942. At this time, the 34th Battalion returned to New Zealand on board the SS President Coolidge. It arrived in Auckland on 6 July and its personnel went on leave before reassembling at Manurewa in early August.

By this stage of the war, the New Zealand government had authorised the raising of the 3rd Division for service in the Pacific against the Japanese. To be formed in New Zealand, the division was based around the recently returned 8th and 14th Brigades, and the battalions making up these formations, and commanded by Major General Harold Barrowclough. Barrowclough set about organising the new division and implemented training programs to prepare his new command for fighting against the Japanese in the Pacific. However, at the request of Vice Admiral Robert L. Ghormley, commander of the South Pacific Area, the 34th Battalion was selected in October 1942 to garrison Tonga. The move was to replace American forces that had moved to Guadalcanal. The battalion was withdrawn from divisional exercises in the Waikato region of the North Island and shipped to Tonga's main island of Tongatapu aboard the SS President Jackson. Now commanded by Lieutenant Colonel Richard Eyre, the battalion remained here under American control for a period of five months.

=== Solomon Islands ===
In the meantime, the rest of the 3rd Division had been progressively sent to New Caledonia where it underwent further combat training. The 34th Battalion, its duties on Tongatapu at an end, joined the division in March 1943. In July 1943, Barrowclough informed the New Zealand government that it was ready for combat duties, so in early September 1943, it moved to Guadalcanal for a combat role as part of the Solomon Islands campaign. However along the way, the troops stopped briefly at Port Vila in the New Hebrides to carry practice amphibious operations with landing craft before continuing onto Guadalcanal. Arriving off their destination on 14 September, the battalion was landed the same day. Jungle training remained the focus of the battalion although they also took the opportunity to work with Valentine tanks.

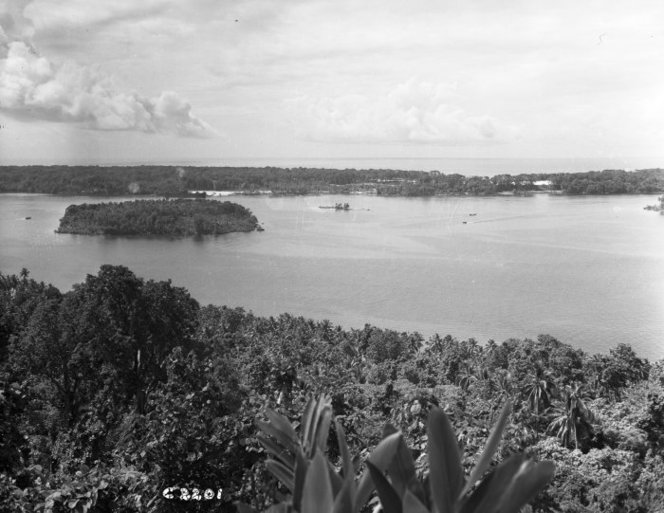
During the Battle of the Treasury Islands, the 34th Battalion was tasked with securing Stirling Island, seen here in the distance, while the 29th and 36th Battalions landed on Mono Island, the southern coast of which is in the immediate foreground

The following month, the 8th Brigade participated in the Battle of the Treasury Islands. This involved landings to secure the Treasury Islands from the Japanese in order to conduct future operations on Bougainville. It was to be the first opposed amphibious landing carried out by New Zealand troops since the Gallipoli campaign in 1915. The 34th Battalion was tasked with securing Stirling Island, which military intelligence believed to be unoccupied, while at around the same time the 29th and 36th Battalions would land on Mono Island to deal with the Japanese garrison. To assist the efforts on Mono Island, one company of 34th Battalion was detached to form part of Logan Force, commanded by Major Logan, formerly of 34th Battalion. This was a small battle group, which also included a section of machine gun troops, to provide security for American construction and technical personnel that would be landed at Soanotalu, on the north coast of Mono Island, to establish a radar station.

Prior to the landing, the battalion's training intensity was stepped up, including more practice landings, and on 27 October, at 6:25 am, the 34th Battalion landed on Stirling Island at two beaches, designated Purple 2 and Purple 3. As expected, the landing was unopposed. The initial landing involved two companies, one at each beach. These secured the perimeter of landing zones before a third company landed and moved into the interior of the island to confirm the absence of Japanese. With the island secure, a platoon moved over to nearby Mono Island to assist 36th Battalion in manning the perimeter it had established on that island. In the meantime, while the Japanese were not physically on the island, they still carried out bombing raids at the landing zones. On 29 October, the battalion detached another company to assist 29th Battalion and two days later a further company was sent to Mono Island to replace one of the hard pressed 36th Battalion's which in turn took over that company's positions on Stirling Island for a rest.

On Mono Island, the main landing along the south coast had been achieved with relative ease, with few casualties although they had to fend off some attacks that night. However, Logan Force which had landed as planned at Soanotalu, on the opposite side of the island to 29th and 36th Battalions, experienced some difficulty. Initially unopposed, a defensive perimeter had been established and the American technicians got to work. Over the next three days, some contact had been made with Japanese soldiers, which had evaded the New Zealanders to the south, looking to escape the island by seizing a barge. During the evening of 1 November, a party of 80 Japanese, began attacking Logan Force. A small group of six soldiers from 34th Battalion plus three Americans held a blockhouse throughout the night and by dawn, over 50 Japanese had been killed for the loss of five men. By early November, Japanese resistance had largely been overcome although patrols still made contact with small parties of Japanese and on 12 November, Mono Island was considered to be secure. By this stage, the battalion had reassembled on Mono Island. There were still isolated Japanese that needed to be captured or killed and patrols were ongoing well into January 1944. By this stage, the battalion was commanded by Lieutenant Colonel J. Reidy, taking over from Eyre who was now too old for active service and had returned to New Zealand.

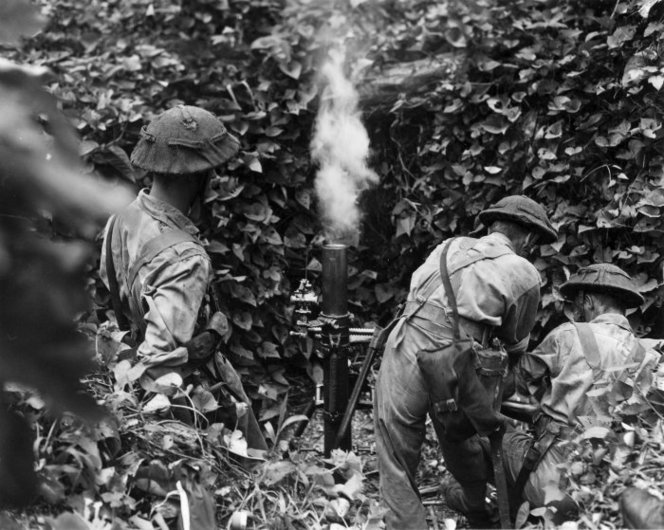
A mortar squad trains with a 3-inch mortar on Mono Island

=== Disbandment ===
In early January 1944, in order to rectify a shortage of labour in the primary production sector of the country's economy, the New Zealand government, in consultation with the United States and the United Kingdom, decided that it was necessary to release manpower from the military back into the civilian workforce. After some debate, it was decided that this manpower would come from the 3rd Division, while the 2nd New Zealand Division, which was fighting in Italy, would be allowed to remain intact.

Accordingly, the 3rd Division received orders to begin repatriating personnel back to New Zealand in April 1944 and shortly afterwards a first group of 1,800 soldiers from the division left the operational area. Returning to Nouméa in May, the battalion spent time here. There was little training and drafts of personnel began shipping back to New Zealand the following month. At the time, it was understood that this was simply a furlough and most were expected to return to military service, if not 34th Battalion, in due course. However, by the time those soldiers returning from furlough had assembled at Papakura Military Camp, it had been officially announced that the 3rd Division was to be disbanded and the 34th Battalion ceased to exist on 20 October 1944. Of the 1,949 men who are listed on the battalion's nominal roll the 34th Battalion lost four men killed in action, one died of wounds received in action, while two others died on active service.

== Honours ==
Two gallantry medals were awarded to personnel of the battalion; one officer received the American Legion of Merit while another soldier received the Military Medal, both for the operation with Logan Force on Mono Island during the Battle of the Treasury Islands. Four more personnel were mentioned in despatches. For its service in the war, the 34th Battalion received three battle honours: "Solomons", "Treasury Islands", and "South Pacific 1942–44". These honours were not perpetuated.

== Commanding officers ==
The following officers commanded the 34th Battalion during the war:

- Lieutenant Colonel Francis W. Voelcker (November 1940–June 1942); (Note: Voelcker was later awarded the Distinguished Service Order for his service with the Fijian Military Forces and was the Administrator of Western Samoa from 1946 to 1949.)
- Lieutenant Colonel John A. M. Clachan (June–August 1942);
- Lieutenant Colonel Richard J. Eyre (August 1942 –December 1943);
- Lieutenant Colonel J. M. Reidy (December 1943–January 1945).

== Notes ==
Footnotes

Citations
