= 36th Battalion (New Zealand) =

- Active: 1941–44
- Country: New Zealand
- Branch: New Zealand Military Forces
- Type: Infantry
- Size: ~700–900 personnel
- Part of: 8th Brigade, 3rd Division
- Engagements: Second World War: Battle of the Treasury Islands

Commanders
- Notable commanders: John Barry

Insignia
- Distinguishing Patch

The 36th Battalion was an infantry battalion of the New Zealand Military Forces, which served during the Second World War. Attached to the 8th Brigade, New Zealand 3rd Division, the battalion was formed in late 1941 and saw service in the Pacific against the Japanese. They were initially used for garrison duties on Fiji and Norfolk Island before being committed to the fighting in the Solomon Islands in 1943. The battalion was disbanded in late 1944 as part of a partial demobilisation of New Zealand forces, which saw some of its personnel being returned to civilian employment while others were sent to Italy as reinforcements for the New Zealand 2nd Division.

== History ==
=== Formation ===
The battalion was formed on 29 December 1941 at Papakura, (Note: Gillespie states that the 36th Battalion came into being at Burnham Camp.) under the command of Lieutenant Colonel John Barry, in response to Japan's entry into the war following the bombing of Pearl Harbor and the invasion of Malaya. With the possibility of a Japanese advance south through the Pacific, the New Zealand government decided to raise a force of three infantry battalions to bolster the garrison in Fiji. The 36th Battalion was one of these units; the others being the 35th and 37th Battalions. Upon formation, the majority of the battalion's other ranks were drawn from men from the Central Districts who were originally intended to be sent to the Middle East as reinforcements for the New Zealand 2nd Division, while officers were mainly sourced from armoured formations such as the Tank Brigade and the Divisional Cavalry Regiment. Upon establishment, the battalion consisted of a headquarters company, three rifle companies and a machine-gun/support company.

=== Fiji and Norfolk Island ===
After less than a month, the battalion began moving overseas. In early January 1942 they were sent to Fiji, where they were billeted outside of Suva. Shortly after their arrival, the 36th Battalion became part of the 8th Brigade along with the 29th and 34th Battalions. Later this brigade became part of the New Zealand 3rd Division. During their stay on Fiji, the 36th Battalion was employed in defensive duties, constructing fixed positions at key locations as the island was prepared for a possible Japanese invasion.

In early March, the battalion began nightly alerts and training exercises were undertaken as the threat of Japanese invasion increased. In May, following the Battle of the Coral Sea, the alerts came to an end but the exercises continued throughout the battalion's time on Fiji. These were punctuated by ceremonial duties in June when New Zealand, Fijian and Free French forces paraded together in Suva, Finally, in July, it was decided that the responsibility of the defence of Fiji would be passed to the United States and the majority of the New Zealand force would return to New Zealand. On 5 August, the 36th Battalion boarded the transport ship President Coolidge and departed five days later.

They disembarked at Waitematā Harbour on 14 August and after a brief return to Papakura, the battalion received 14 days' leave. Following this, the battalion was assigned to the role of mobile reserve and was moved to Avondale in Auckland. At this time the battalion received a draft of reinforcements as soldiers over the age of 40 were discharged from the service before the battalion was detached from the 8th Brigade and sent to Norfolk Island in October 1942, where they relieved Australian forces that had been stationed there. Supported by a number of attached artillery and engineer units, the 36th Battalion formed the core of N Force, tasked with the responsibility of defending the island. They remained there until late March 1943, when the 36th Battalion was relieved by the 1st Battalion, Wellington-West Coast Regiment and rejoined the rest of the New Zealand 3rd Division in New Caledonia.

=== New Caledonia, New Hebrides and Guadalcanal ===
The 36th Battalion disembarked at Noumea on 31 March 1943. After moving to Bouloupari, the battalion rejoined the 8th Brigade, now under the command of Brigadier Robert Row. An advanced party set up camp near the Ouenghi River and after the main body of the battalion arrived on 7 April they began to receive new equipment and stores and undertook jungle warfare training and a series of exercises in preparation for employment on future operations. At the end of May, the battalion was converted to a 'jungle establishment' which saw it lose a number of its heavy weapons to the brigade-level machine-gun company and the conversion of the support company ('D' Company) into the battalion's fourth rifle company.

In early June, the battalion took part in a week-long brigade-level exercise. Afterwards the news was announced that the commanding officer, Barry, was relinquishing command due to poor health. The battalion second in command took over temporarily before a new commanding officer, Lieutenant Colonel K. B McKenzie-Muirson, arrived in July. At the same time, a draft of 89 reinforcements arrived to replace men that had been transferred, discharged or promoted. Throughout August preparations were made for the battalion to move once again and it was at this time that they were formed into a "battalion combat team" with attached artillery, engineers and logistics support.

The task of packing stores and equipment then began and on 2 September the battalion boarded the American transport President Jackson at Noumea, bound for the New Hebrides. They arrived at Vila Harbour on 5 September and over the course of a week, they conducted a number of amphibious exercises before proceeding on to Guadalcanal in the Solomon Islands. They conducted a non-tactical landing on 14 September and unloaded stores before moving 4 miles (6.4 km) inland and began to set up camp. After the camp was established, for the next month the battalion was employed mainly in unloading stores from ships and carrying out training. During this time training was focused on patrolling and jungle survival techniques. They also spent some time learning how to conduct infantry operations with close armoured support.

In mid-October training came to an end and the battalion prepared to move again as orders were received that the 8th Brigade was finally to be committed to a combat role. A short time thereafter, they conducted a brigade-level landing rehearsal along with the 29th Battalion on Florida Island, about 20 miles (32 km) from Guadalcanal. Following this, the 36th Battalion was involved in the 8th Brigade's landing on Mono Island as part of the plan to secure the Treasury Islands in order to conduct future operations on Bougainville, in the first opposed amphibious landing carried out by New Zealand troops since the Gallipoli campaign in 1915.

=== Treasury Islands ===
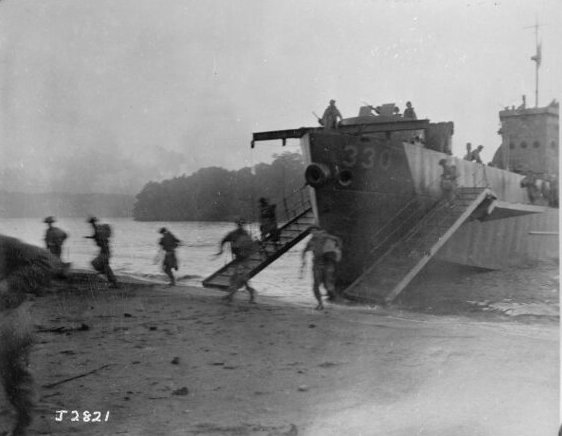
Soldiers landing on Mono Island from a Landing Craft Infantry while under fire

The embarkation was undertaken in two waves. 'C' and 'D' Companies boarded Landing Craft Infantry (LCI) vessels at Kukrum early on 25 October, while 'A' and 'B' Companies boarded High speed transports (known as APDs) the following day. In the early hours of 27 October, following a naval bombardment of the Japanese positions around the village of Falamai on the southern coast of Mono Island the 36th Battalion went ashore on the left flank of the 29th Battalion. 'A' and 'B' Companies landed unopposed to the west of Falamai in between the Saveke River and Cutler's Creek at 6:26 am and after organising themselves on the beach, they advanced inland in order to vacate the beach for the 'D' Company, which came ashore in the second wave at 6:46. While these forward companies moved inland, 'C' Company began the task of unloading stores on the beachhead. This was completed within 20 minutes.

The advance from the beachhead proved slow in the thick undergrowth, nevertheless 'A' Company managed to locate the Japanese headquarters about 500 yards (460 m) west of the Saveke River, and while the defenders' fire was suppressed with mortars, the company commander, Captain K. E. Loudon, led the New Zealanders across the river and undertook a series of flanking moves in order to surround, and subsequently capture, the Japanese position. For this action Loudon later received the Military Cross.

Following this a perimeter was established about 250 yards (230 m) from the beach and the Landing Ship Tank (LST) vessels arrived to begin unloading more stores and equipment. While this occurred, small details of New Zealanders set about the task of rooting out individual Japanese soldiers that had remained hidden during the initial advance inland. Shortly after 7:00 am, the Japanese began to attack the beach with artillery and mortar fire, while a group of Japanese in previously undetected pillboxes began pouring machine-gun fire on to the LSTs, causing a number of casualties amongst the 36th Battalion. By mid-morning the location of the Japanese observation post was discovered and two platoons were sent out by the carrier platoon and 'A' Company. One of these platoons, under Second Lieutenant L. T. G. Booth, subsequently managed to capture two 75 mm guns and a 90 mm mortar after fighting their way up a high point west of the river. Booth was subsequently awarded the Military Cross for his leadership.

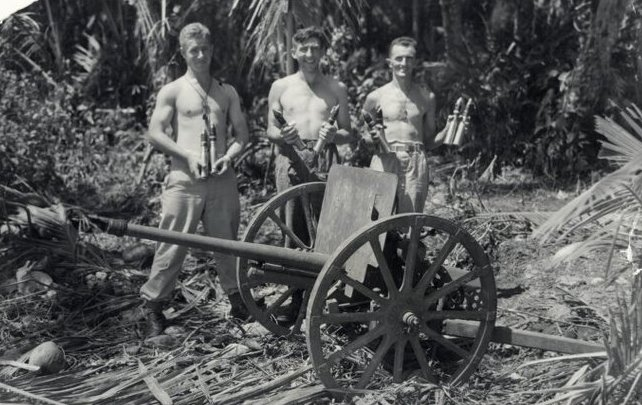
New Zealand soldiers with a Japanese mountain gun captured at the Treasury Islands

Meanwhile, the rest of the battalion continued the slow advance inland. By 2:30 pm they had advanced 600 yards (550 m) north of Falamai and the decision was made to establish the battalion perimeter, set up headquarters and send out patrols. The attached engineers began cutting roads and supplies were subsequently brought up as the battalion prepared for its first night ashore. During the night, the battalion's position was attacked from the air and by indirect fire, while small parties of Japanese attempted to infiltrate the perimeter in an effort to reach the food stores that they had left behind during their retreat inland.

Following this, the 36th Battalion settled into a routine of patrolling operations as they searched the immediate vicinity for the Japanese who had withdrawn following the initial assault. There were no clashes during this time, however, and by the end of October, the battalion received orders to prevent the Japanese from attempting to effect an evacuation and to begin deliberate search operations. On 1 November, the rest of the 8th Brigade arrived, and after a Japanese counterattack on elements of the 34th Battalion at Soanotalu was beaten off on the night of 1/2 November, throughout early November, the 36th Battalion sent a number of reconnaissance patrols further afield; the coastal area near Laifa Point was cleared by the carrier platoon and a 37 mm mountain gun was captured, along with a quantity of ammunition, although its crew managed to escape. Later, a patrol was sent to the point itself, contact was made and fire exchanged, but no casualties were received or inflicted. At the same time, a larger patrol, under Major I. G. O'Neill, was sent north towards Ulapu, where they rendezvoused with a resupply barge. After continuing on to Soanatalu and crossing the Besara River, the patrol's local guide found signs of recent Japanese presence and later a raft was located, and was later destroyed. After continuing the patrol, the New Zealanders were suddenly engaged from a number of caves and over the course of a two-hour fire fight, 10 Japanese were killed and one was captured, while one New Zealander was killed. The following day, O'Neill's patrol used a barge to make their return to the main battalion position at Falamai. This was the last "significant action" on Mono. For his actions during the engagement around the cave complex, Corporal F. A. Armstrong, was awarded the Military Medal.

Meanwhile, 'A' Company, after returning from a short break on Stirling Island, conducted patrols around Malsi and Soanatalu, killing one Japanese and capturing two others, while 'B' Company patrolled the western coast of the island. By 7 November, the battalion's casualties amounted to 77 men, including 14 killed in action. Upon the arrival of more permanent stores and equipment, the majority of the 36th Battalion was re-established at various locations on Stirling Island; 'B' Company, however, remained on Mono Island and was detached to the Avon River. In December, the battalion received a draft of reinforcements while the second in command, Major B. H. Pringle, was promoted to lieutenant colonel and took over command of the battalion from McKenzie-Muirson.

Throughout December and into January 1944, the only contact with the Japanese came in the form of air raids over the islands, and the men were kept busy undertaking labouring tasks in between regular patrolling operations and training sessions. In late February the air raids stopped and as the main fighting bypassed the Treasuries the 8th Brigade was relegated to relatively routine tasks. Nevertheless, until April 1944 the battalion remained spread throughout Mono and Stirling Islands to defend against a possible Japanese counterattack from the Shortland Islands, and to continue the work of loading and unloading stores and equipment.

=== Disbandment ===
In early January 1944, in order to rectify a shortage of labour in the primary production sector of the New Zealand economy, the New Zealand government, in consultation with the United States and the United Kingdom, decided that it was necessary to release manpower from the military back into the civilian workforce. After some debate, it was decided that this manpower would come from the 3rd Division, while the 2nd Division, which was fighting in Italy, would be allowed to remain intact.

For the battalion, the result was that a number of its personnel, including the commanding officer, Pringle, were repatriated to New Zealand for discharge. As the battalion's numbers dwindled, in April the furthest positions were abandoned, with 'B' Company being moved to Stirling Island alongside 'A' Company at Soala Lakes and 'D' Company moved to Lakemba Cove where it was co-located with 'C' Company. In May the battalion was relieved by an American unit from the US 93rd Division and was withdrawn back to New Caledonia on board the USS Tryon. Command of the battalion then passed between the second in command, Major H. F. Allen, and then when he departed, to Major I. G. O'Neill. Throughout June and July, the battalion's existence on New Caledonia was largely devoted to inter-unit sporting contests as further drafts of personnel were returned to New Zealand, Finally, on 13 August 1944, the last group of men departed New Caledonia and returned to New Zealand via Noumea. Shortly thereafter, the 36th Battalion was disbanded, although a number of battalion personnel were subsequently sent to Italy as reinforcements for units of the 2nd Division.

During the war, the 36th Battalion lost 14 men killed in action, while seven others died on active service. (Note: 10 ex-members of the battalion were killed in action while serving in other units on New Georgia and in Italy, while two others died on active service in Egypt.) 1,338 men are listed on the battalion's nominal roll. Two members of the battalion received the Military Cross, while one received the Military Medal.

For its service, the 36th Battalion received three battle honours: "Solomons", "Treasury Islands" and "South Pacific 1942–44". In 1957, these honours were passed to the battalion's successor units: the Wellington Regiment, the Wellington West Coast and Taranaki Regiment and the Hawke's Bay Regiment.

== Notes ==
Footnotes

Citations
