= Battle of the Treasury Islands =

1943 WWII battle

Coordinates: 7°23′15″S 155°33′30″E

- Part of the Pacific Theatre of the Second World War
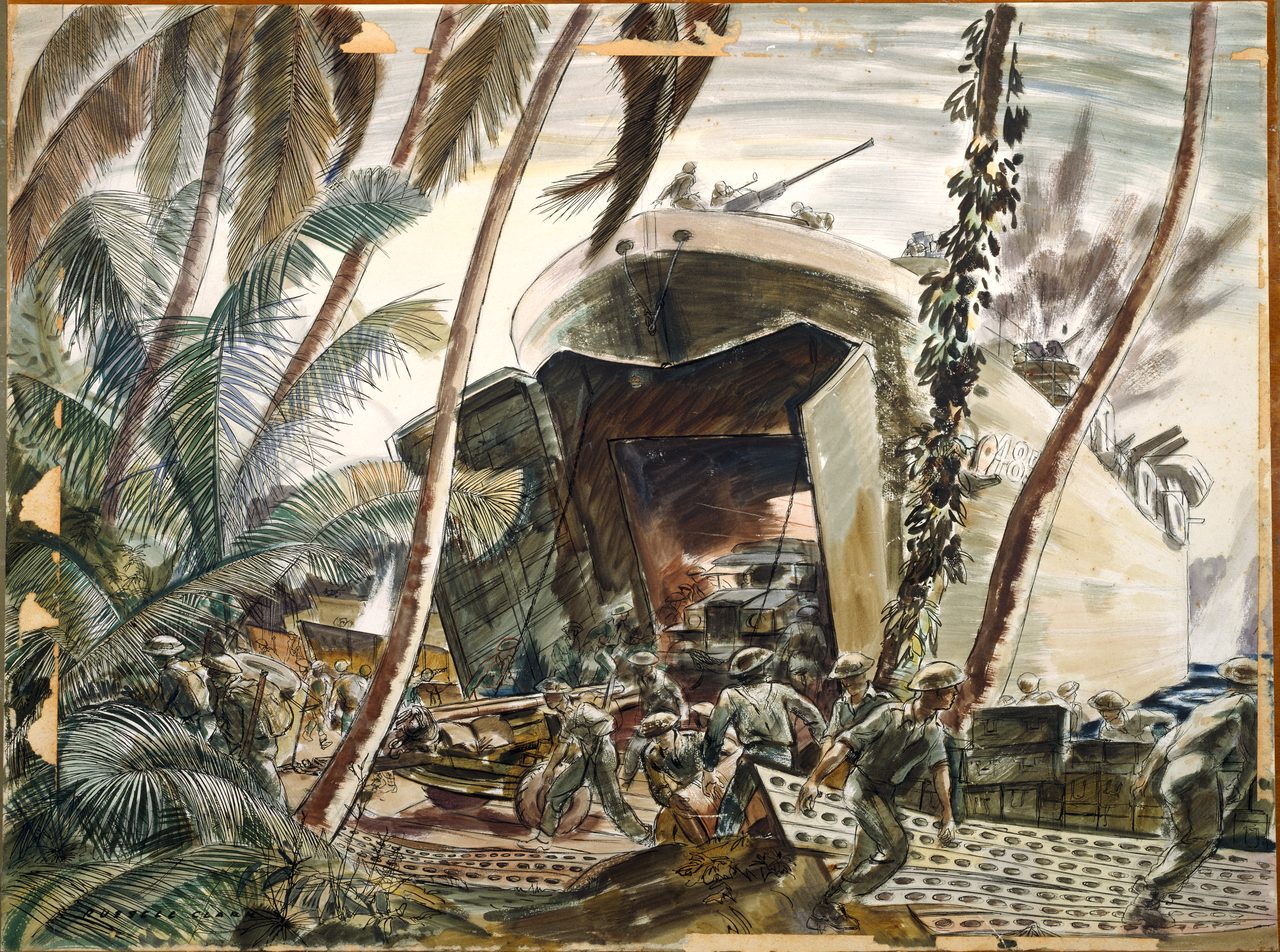
- Russell Clark's painting Landing ships under fire, Treasury Island (3rd NZ Division), 27 October 1943
Date	27 October–12 November 1943
Location	Treasury Islands in the Solomon Islands
Result	Allied victory

Belligerents
New Zealand; United States	Japan

Commanders and leaders
(Dominion of New Zealand) Robert A. Row (United States) George Fort	(Empire of Japan) Toyosaku Nakaseko † (Note: In 1946 Nakaseko was given a posthumous promotion backdated to 11 November 1943.)

Strength
6,574 men (Note: Consisting of 4,608 New Zealanders and 1,966 Americans.); 6 destroyers 32 aircraft	231+ men (Note: Strength is based on the Japanese casualty figure however occasional Japanese holdouts were sighted within the island's jungles though to December and January leaving a definite figure unknown.); 49 planes

Casualties and losses
52 dead 174 wounded (Note: New Zealand casualties: 40 killed and 145 wounded. United States casualties: 12 killed and 29 wounded.); 1 destroyer damaged	223 dead 8 POW (Note: 205 Japanese soldiers were killed by 12 November, the figure rising to 223 by the end of the month. 8 Japanese soldiers were taken prisoner.); 12 planes

The Battle of the Treasury Islands was a Second World War battle that took place between 27 October and 12 November 1943 on the Treasury Islands group, part of the Solomon Islands. The battle formed part of the wider Pacific War and involved New Zealand and US forces fighting against Japanese troops. The majority of the ground forces were provided by the New Zealand 3rd Division.

The Allied invasion of the Japanese-held island group intended to secure Mono and Stirling Islands so that a radar station could be constructed on the former and the latter be used as a staging area for an assault on Bougainville. The attack on the Treasury Islands would serve the long term Allied strategy of isolating Bougainville and Rabaul and the elimination of the Japanese garrison in the area.

== Background ==
As part of the Allied strategy of isolating Bougainville and Rabaul and eliminating the large Japanese garrison in the area, in late 1943, as the Solomon Islands campaign progressed, the Allies decided to launch an attack on the Treasury Islands. The invasion, to be conducted primarily by the New Zealand Army, supported by American forces, was codenamed Operation Goodtime. For the operation, the New Zealand 8th Infantry Brigade Group, commanded by Brigadier Robert Row and part of the New Zealand 3rd Division, was assigned to the United States' III Amphibious Force, which assigned its Southern Force under Rear Admiral George H. Fort for the operation.

Consisting of two islands, Mono and Stirling, the Treasuries are located 300 miles (480 km) northwest of Guadalcanal, 60 miles (97 km) west-northwest of Vella Lavella, and 18 miles (29 km) south of the Shortland Islands. The Japanese had dispatched 133 men from the Kure 7th Special Naval Landing Force (SNLF) from Buin to Mono on September 8 1943. An additional 24 troops from the Sasebo 6th SNLF were sent on the evening of October 22 and by October 27 a total of 189 men were garrisoned the island. These forces were commanded by Naval Ensign Toyosaku Nakaseko (中瀬古豊作) and subordinate to the 1st Base Force in Bougainville.

At the time of the battle, the islands offered the Allies further opportunities to bypass large groups of Japanese forces as they advanced through the Solomons towards the main Japanese base around Rabaul, the reduction of which was a key part of the overarching Allied strategy developed under the guise of Operation Cartwheel. The islands were endowed with a deep natural harbour – Blanche Harbour – which the Allies determined would be useful for supporting landing operations at Cape Torokina on Bougainville. Mono Island, with its high features, offered the prospect of serving as a radar station to provide early warning for aerial and naval surface attacks during the Cape Torokina operation. The Allies also hoped that the landing would convince the Japanese that their next move would be on the Shortlands or at Buin on the southern tip of Bougainville, instead of the Cape Torokina – Empress Augusta Bay area.

== Operation ==
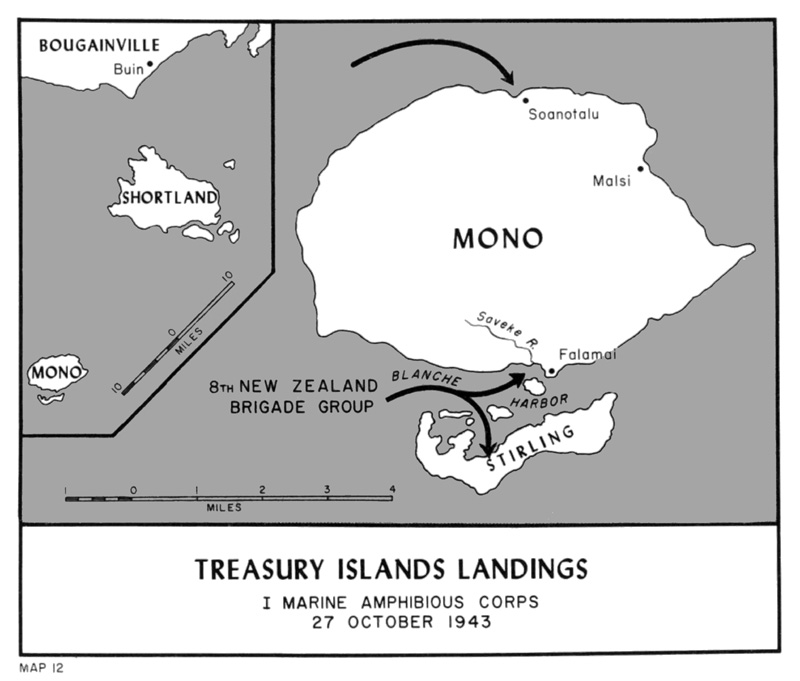
Treasury Islands landings, October 1943

The Allies launched the invasion of the Treasury Islands at 06:06 on 27 October. Three echelons of high speed transports, totalling eight vessels, were assembled for the operation. In addition, there were eight LCIs; two LSTs and three LCTs allocated. Several minor reconnaissance operations were undertaken prior to the landing, firstly on 22–23 August and then 21–22 October. Meanwhile, the assaulting force conducted rehearsals off Florida Island in the lead up.

Commencing on 27 October, following a short naval and aerial bombardment, seven APDs arrived in the transport area west of Cummings Point on Stirling Island and began disgorging their smaller landing craft, which were assigned to land forces on either side of the harbour. Despite heavy rain which reduced visibility, the destroyers USS Philip and Pringle laid down a heavy but ultimately ineffective pre-landing bombardment. Following this, two infantry battalions—the 29th and 36th—landed around Falamai on the southern coast of Mono Island, approximately 2 miles (3.2 km) away from Blanche Harbour's western entrance. Meanwhile, a detachment from the 34th Infantry Battalion landed on Stirling Island, while another detachment of 200 personnel from the 34th, supported by the APD USS McKean, skirted around the western side of the island and landed to the north around Soanotalu, to provide security for a radar station that would be installed there.

A total 3,795 men landed in the assault wave with the remainder of the Allied force landing in four waves during the following 20 days, to reach 6,574 men. The operation was the first amphibious assault launched by New Zealand troops since the Gallipoli campaign in 1915. It was the second combat operation undertaken by the New Zealanders in the Pacific, following the Land Battle of Vella Lavella, which had taken place the previous month. The New Zealand infantry were supported by US combat support and service support units including a naval construction battalion (the 87th), a signals unit, a naval base unit, and a coastal artillery battalion (the 198th) to provide anti-aircraft fire support.

The Japanese Garrison issued a telegram stating "The enemy commenced landing at 0340 hours, we are in the midst of resisting." Communications with the garrison were subsequently lost at 7:20 AM. Caught by surprise, the Japanese were unable to scramble aircraft to attack the assault craft until after the troops had landed. Subsequently, late on 27 October, a force of 25 dive bombers attacked two US destroyers, USS Cony and Philip. In the ensuing melee, 12 Japanese aircraft were shot down by supporting AirSols fighters and naval gunfire, while Cony was hit aft twice, resulting in the death of eight of her crew and the wounding of 10 others. The destroyer was taken under tow and taken back to Tulagi for repairs.

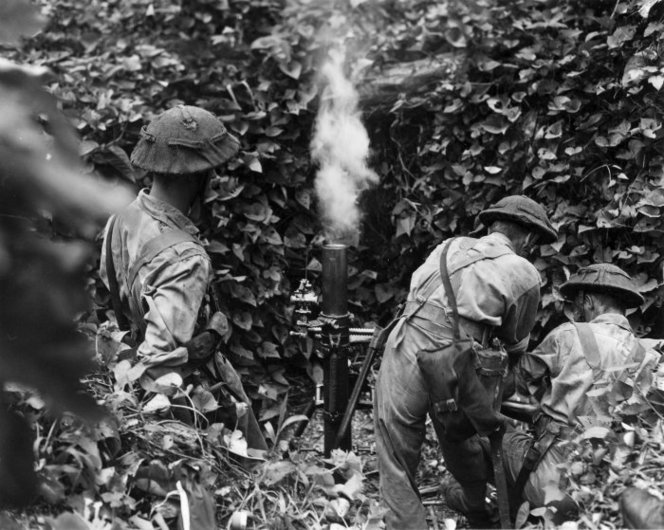
A New Zealand mortar squad on Mono Island

Meanwhile the fighting continued on shore. Resistance to the initial landing was light and was quickly overcome with only a small number of casualties, which came exclusively in the first wave of the assault. Over the course of several hours, a beachhead around Falamai was secured amidst sporadic resistance from the Japanese, and then over the following days patrols were sent out to clear the island. Meanwhile, the force holding Soanotalu fought off several attacks between 29 October and 2 November, including one attack by a company-sized element that resulted in about 40 Japanese being killed. On Stirling Island, the New Zealanders had been virtually unopposed and after landing had settled down to a routine of patrolling and base development. There were a few minor Japanese raids, but largely Japanese air assets were focused on responding to the landing around Cape Torokina, which commenced on 1 November.

The British flag was raised over the ruins of Falamai, the islands' capital, and civil administration was restored on 1 November. Mopping up operations began, and over the course of 11 days several minor engagements took place as patrols sought to flush out Japanese troops that were hiding out mainly in caves on the northern coast. These engagements resulted in further casualties on both sides, with several groups of Japanese being killed in firefights with New Zealand patrols.

== Aftermath ==
On 12 November, the islands were declared clear of Japanese forces, although Japanese holdouts were sighted in the jungles into January 1944. The operation, in conjunction with a raid on Choiseul, served to divert the attention of the Japanese Seventeenth Army from the next major Allied target in the Solomon Islands campaign. The success of the operation also helped to improve the planning of subsequent landings in the Pacific. The New Zealanders' next combat operation would be the Battle of the Green Islands, in early 1944. Casualties during the operation amounted to 226 for the Allies, consisting of 40 New Zealanders killed and 145 wounded, and 12 Americans killed and 29 wounded. The Japanese lost 223 killed and eight captured.

Seabees from Company A of the 87th Naval Construction Battalion, along with a 25-man detachment from its Headquarters Company, landed on 27 October. One Seabee raised the blade on his bulldozer to use it as a shield and attacked a Japanese machine gun nest with it. The Seabees built 21 miles (34 km) of roads and established a PT boat base on Stirling Island. They were joined by the rest of the 87th Naval Construction Battalion on 28 November. It then commenced construction of an airstrip 5,600 feet (1,700 m) long and 200 feet (61 m) wide, along with taxiways, hardstands and an aviation gasoline farm with five 1,000-barrel (160,000 L) storage tanks. The job was handed over to the 82nd Naval Construction Battalion in December, and it was joined by the 88th Naval Construction Battalion in January. The airstrip was subsequently extended to 7,000 by 300 feet (2,134 by 91 m).

The 87th Naval Construction Battalion turned to construction of wharf facilities to accommodate large ocean-going vessels. Four 6-by-18-foot (1.8 by 5.5 m) pontoon barges were secured to 16-by-16-foot (4.9 by 4.9 m) timber crib piers, which were connected to the shore by ramps made of girders covered with wooden planks. The first ship docked on 30 January 1944. A naval base was developed with workshops and stage facilities, and a 100-bed hospital.

PT boats based in the Treasury Islands helped protect Allied forces landing at Torokina, while a radar site was established around Soanotalu, which played an important part in the success of that operation. The airbase was used by the medium bombers of the USAAF's 42d Bombardment Group and the U.S. Marine Corps' VMB-413, while the base facilities were utilised by the U.S. Navy's Acorn 12. Base development was considered complete by July 1944, and responsibility for the base was handed over to Construction Battalion Maintenance Units (CBMU) 569 and 587. Some of the base facilities were shipped to Leyte in December 1944 and January 1945, and the base closed when CBMU 569 departed in June 1945.
