= 29th Battalion (New Zealand) =

- Active: 1940–45
- Country: New Zealand
- Branch: New Zealand Military Forces
- Type: Infantry
- Size: ~700–900 personnel
- Part of: 8th Brigade, 3rd Division
- Engagements: Second World War: Battle of the Treasury Islands

Insignia
- Distinguishing Patch

The 29th Battalion was an infantry battalion of the New Zealand 3rd Division, raised for service during the Second World War. Serving in the Pacific, the battalion mainly undertook garrison duties and labouring tasks in Fiji and New Caledonia, but saw brief combat against the Japanese in the Treasury Islands in late 1943. In late 1944, the battalion returned to New Zealand and was broken up to provide reinforcements for the New Zealand 2nd Division in Italy. It was eventually disbanded in January 1945.

== History ==
=== Formation ===
In 1941, and anticipating the entry of the Japanese Empire into the Second World War, the New Zealand Military Forces raised a formation initially known as B Force, later to be designated the 8th Brigade, for garrison duty in Fiji. It had been considered for several years that New Zealand would assume responsibility for the defence of the Fijian colony, which lacked the military capability to defend itself, in the event of war. The infantry component of the brigade was to consist of the 29th Battalion in addition to 30th Battalion.

The 29th Battalion was formed in September 1940, under the command of Lieutenant Colonel H. J. Thompson. The battalion was originally based at Hopuhopu Military Camp but a measles outbreak there forced the military authorities to shift it to Te Rapa, on the outskirts of Hamilton. Many of its personnel had been expecting to be posted to the Middle East to join the 2nd New Zealand Division but instead found themselves sent to Fiji. After travelling to Wellington by train, the battalion departed for Fiji aboard the Rangatira on 27 October 1940.

=== Fiji ===
The 29th Battalion arrived in Fiji in early November 1940 and was put to work on fortifying strategic areas of the colony. It was assigned to the area east of Viti Levu while 30th Battalion, once it arrived in mid-November was positioned to the west. The men struggled to acclimatise to the tropics and their equipment and uniforms were substandard. The battalion's personnel had been advised that their stay in Fiji was to be for six months but it was not until late-May that men from Auckland and Poverty Bay districts were returned to New Zealand. Over the course of the next few months, apart from senior officers, the entire battalion's personnel were replaced, with most of the original members being eventually posted to the Middle East. In the meantime, a stream of replacements from New Zealand maintained the ranks of the battalion.

On 7 December 1941, the entry of Japan into the war prompted the New Zealanders to action stations although they were shortly stood down. The 8th Brigade had been expanded with the arrival of 34th Battalion and its headquarters was the basis for the raising of the 3rd Division. The new division, to be led by Major General William Cunningham, the commander of all Allied forces on Fiji at the time, consisted of 8th Brigade and 14th Brigade. By mid-January 1942, the division was largely complete with 35th, 36th and 37th Battalions now all in Fiji. The New Zealanders remained in Fiji, performing garrison duties and carrying out training exercises until, with the Americans now taking responsibility for the defence of Fiji, they were relieved by US troops in July 1942. At this time, the 29th returned to New Zealand. It arrived in Auckland on 6 July and its personnel enjoyed a period of leave before reassembling at Papakura Military Camp in early August. It resumed training which included a period of learning bush and mountain warfare and as well as an intensive exercise, as part of 3rd Division, in the Kaimai Ranges.

=== Solomon Islands ===
In July 1943, Major General Harold Barrowclough, having taken over command of the division from Cunningham, advised the New Zealand Government that it was ready for combat duties. Accordingly, it was sent to New Caledonia. Here it underwent further combat training and during this time, one member of the battalion died from food poisoning. In early September 1943, it then moved to Guadalcanal as the 3rd Division was given a combat role as part of the Solomon Islands campaign. Within this, the 29th Battalion took part in the 8th Brigade's landing on Mono Island as part of the plan to secure the Treasury Islands from the Japanese in order to conduct future operations on Bougainville, in the first opposed amphibious landing carried out by New Zealand troops since the Gallipoli campaign in 1915. Coming ashore near Falamai in late October, on the island's southern coast, the 29th landed alongside the 36th Battalion, amidst light opposition from Japanese defenders. After the beachhead was secured, patrols were sent inland towards Malsi as Japanese opposition began to grow. By early November, Japanese resistance had largely been overcome following the repulse of a heavy Japanese counter-attack on 2–3 November, although patrol clashes continued throughout December 1943 and into January 1944.

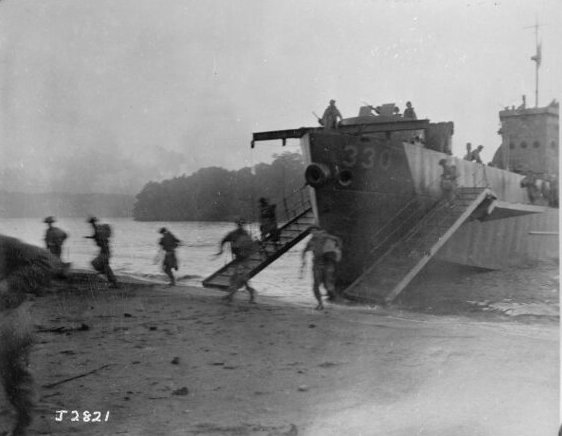
Soldiers landing on Mono Island from a Landing Craft Infantry while under fire

=== Disbandment ===
By 1944, the New Zealand government had become concerned by the country's reduced industrial manpower and it was decided to recall the 3rd Division. This was done piecemeal by progressively reducing the number of men in each battalion so that if necessary, the division could be quickly rebuilt. The first draft of returnees from 29th Battalion intended for priority industries began returning to New Zealand in June 1944 while the battalion itself arrived back in New Zealand later that year. Much reduced in number, after a period of leave, the remaining members of the battalion engaged in labour in the area about its camp in Papakura. The headquarters of 29th Battalion was eventually disestablished in January 1945. While some of the men from the now disbanded 3rd Division remained in New Zealand on home service, many others were sent to Italy as reinforcements for the 2nd New Zealand Division.

During the war, the 29th Battalion lost six men killed in action. A total 2,251 men are listed on the battalion's nominal roll. One member of the battalion received the Military Medal, for actions during the landing on Mono Island. Five members of the battalion were Mentioned in Despatches. For their service, the 29th Battalion received three battle honours: "Solomons", "Treasury Islands" and "South Pacific 1942–44". In 1957, these honours were passed to the battalion's successor units: the Northland Regiment, the Auckland Regiment and the Hauraki Regiment.

== Commanding officers ==
The following officers commanded the 29th Battalion during the war:

- Lieutenant Colonel H. J. Thompson (1940–1942);
- Lieutenant Colonel A. J. Moore (1942–1943);
- Lieutenant Colonel F. L. H. Davis (1943–1945).
