= VMF-413 =

Marine Fighting Squadron 413
- Active: 1 March 1943 – 30 November 1945; unknown – January 1963
- Country: United States
- Allegiance: United States of America
- Branch: United States Marine Corps
- Type: Fighter squadron
- Role: Air interdiction Close air support
- Part of: Inactive
- Nicknames: "Flying Nightmares" "Night Hecklers" "Shamrocks"
- Engagements: World War II

Aircraft flown
- Bomber: PBJ-1D
- Fighter: F-8 Crusader

Marine Fighting Squadron 413 (VMF-413) was a fighter squadron of the Marine Forces Reserve during the Cold War. It descended from bombing squadron VMB-413, which was the Marine Corps' first medium bomber squadron and had fought during World War II. Best known as "Night Hecklers" and the "Shamrocks", the squadron fought in many areas of the Pacific War.

Following the surrender of Japan, the squadron was deactivated on 30 November 1945. VMF-413 reactivated in the Marine Forces Reserve and was based out of Naval Air Station Dallas, Texas, until its deactivation in January 1963.

== History ==
The squadron was activated on 1 March 1943, as Marine Bombing Squadron 413 (VMB-413) at Marine Corps Air Station Cherry Point, North Carolina. On 1 December 1943, the squadron completed their training at MCAS Cherry Point and from there moved to the West Coast until finally leaving from Naval Air Station North Island on 3 January 1944. They arrived at Espiritu Santo on 27 January 1944, and remained there until 7 March 1944, when they were sent to Stirling Island in the Treasury Islands. While stationed there the squadron flew a few night-time heckling missions against the Japanese garrisons at Kahili, Bougainville and Rabaul until July 1944 when they moved back to Espiritu Santo. During that time the squadron lost five aircraft along with 32 crewmen.

In July 1944, VMB-413 began operating from Munda from where they began to raid both Kahili and Choiseul on a regular basis until 18 October 1944 when they moved to Emirau. From there they ran missions against Japanese forces in New Ireland and New Britain until the surrender of Japan in August 1945.

Following the end of the war, the squadron was reactivated in the reserves at Naval Air Station Dallas. During this time, they shared aircraft with VMF-111 and VMF-112 until they were deactivated in January 1963.

== Unit awards ==
A unit citation or commendation is an award bestowed upon an organization for the action cited. Members of the unit who participated in said actions are allowed to wear on their uniforms the awarded unit citation. VMB-413 was presented with the following awards:

Ribbon	Unit Award
	Asiatic-Pacific Campaign Medal
	World War II Victory Medal
	National Defense Service Medal with one Bronze Star

== See also ==
- United States Marine Corps Aviation
- List of active United States Marine Corps aircraft squadrons
- List of decommissioned United States Marine Corps aircraft squadrons
