= Brian Warner =

Brian Warner may refer to:

- Marilyn Manson, born Brian Hugh Warner, American rock musician
- Brian Warner (cricketer), New Zealand cricketer
- Brian Warner (astronomer), British South African astronomer
- Brian D. Warner, American amateur astronomer and computer programmer

== See also ==
- Bryan Warner, Cherokee Nation politician
