= 35th Battalion (New Zealand) =

- Active: 1941–44
- Country: New Zealand
- Branch: New Zealand Military Forces
- Type: Infantry
- Size: ~700–900 personnel
- Part of: 14th Brigade, 3rd Division
- Engagements: Second World War: Battle of Vella Lavella; Battle of the Green Islands

Insignia
- Distinguishing Patch

The 35th Battalion was an infantry battalion of the New Zealand Military Forces, which served in the Pacific theatre of the Second World War from 1941 to 1944. Attached to the 14th Brigade, the battalion was formed in late 1941 and saw service in the Pacific against the Japanese as part of the New Zealand 3rd Division. It initially performed garrison duties on Fiji and New Caledonia before being committed to the fighting in the Solomon Islands in 1943. Returned to New Zealand in late 1944, the battalion was disbanded in early 1945 during a partial demobilisation of New Zealand forces. Many of its personnel returned to civilian employment while others were sent to Italy as reinforcements for the New Zealand 2nd Division. The battalion was awarded four battle honours for its various engagements during the war.

== History ==
=== Formation ===
Anticipating the entry of the Japanese Empire into the Second World War, the New Zealand Military Forces raised the 8th Infantry Brigade Group for garrison duty in Fiji. It had been considered for several years that New Zealand would assume responsibility for the defence of the colony, which was incapable of defending itself, in the event of war. The brigade group, commanded by Brigadier William Cunningham, arrived in Fiji in November 1940 and was put to work on fortifying strategic areas of the colony.

The 35th Battalion, shortly to be one of three battalions of the 14th Brigade, was formed in December 1941 to reinforce the Fiji garrison following New Zealand's declaration of war on Japan after the attack on Pearl Harbor. Based initially at Papakura Military Camp under the command of Lieutenant Colonel W. Murphy, formerly of the New Zealand Staff Corps, its personnel were men from the Northern Military District, many of whom had been expecting to be posted to the Middle East to join the 2nd New Zealand Division. The battalion was organised into three infantry companies, plus support and headquarters companies.

=== Fiji ===
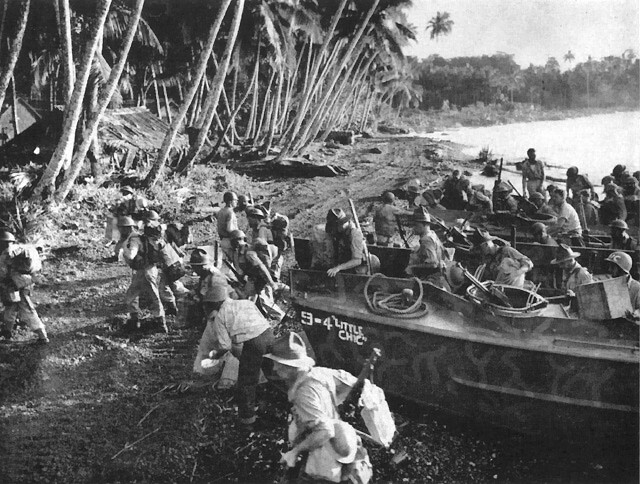
Soldiers of 3rd New Zealand Division land on Vella Lavella, in the Solomon Islands, 17 September 1943

On arrival in Fiji in January 1942, the battalion was tasked with the defence of Nadi Bay and the Royal New Zealand Air Force airbase positioned there. The battalion was now under the command of Lieutenant Colonel G. H. Tomline as Murphy had been assigned to the headquarters of the newly formed 3rd New Zealand Division, to which 14th Brigade had been made subordinate. It commenced the preparation of defences, including digging weapon pits, building tank traps and laying 16,000 metres (17,000 yd) of barbed wire. Once adequate defences had been prepared, training commenced in April. Lieutenant Colonel C. F. Seaward took over from Tomline at this time. The battalion was relieved by the 37th Division of the United States Army in June and returned to New Zealand the following month.

=== Solomon Islands ===
The battalion spent the next several months in training at locations about the central North Island before embarking for New Caledonia in December as part of the New Zealand 3rd Division, which was working up for operations in the tropics. On New Caledonia, the New Zealanders replaced units of the United States Army, which were moved onto Guadalcanal. While on New Caledonia, the battalion carried out jungle training before departing for Guadalcanal in August 1943. By this time, the support company had been converted to an infantry role, with its machine-guns being brought under brigade control and the mortars assigned to the headquarters company. The battalion spent a month on Guadalcanal, establishing camps and conducting patrols to monitor for any surprise landings by the Japanese.

In September, the 35th Battalion departed for the island of Vella Lavella, west of Guadalcanal. The southern part of the island was held by the United States Army while the Japanese continued to hold coastal positions in the north. The New Zealanders were to clear the island of the remaining Japanese, of which there were believed to be about 500 to 700. The battalion, which was landed on the island on 17 September, was reinforced with an artillery battery, an engineer section, and a field ambulance in what was designated the 35th Battalion Combat Team. Four days later, it struck out for the north. A series of amphibious landings along the western side of the island was planned while the 37th Battalion did the same around the eastern side.

After an initial landing was made on 23 September at Mundi Mundi and the area secured, a second landing was made the following day at Matu Suroto. After a series of patrols observed Japanese soldiers, but without engaging them to avoid disclosing the presence of the New Zealanders, the battalion attacked a Japanese camp at Timbala Bay on 28 September. After securing the camp without incident, patrols were ambushed by the enemy. Over the following week a series of platoon and company sized actions took place amid isolated tracks in the jungle, as a multitude of snipers and machine gun posts were dealt as patrols probed further inland of Timbala Bay. By 5 October, 37th Battalion had reached the bay on the other side of Timbala, effectively trapping the Japanese, which numbered about 500 according to a captured prisoner, between it and the 35th Battalion. On the night of 6 October the New Zealanders were bombed and it was later found that this was a cover for the evacuation of the remaining Japanese. Several days later, battalion personnel were subject to a friendly fire incident when a Corsair strafed a barge carrying some soldiers on a supply run. One soldier was killed and two were wounded.

The battalion remained on the island until February 1944. It initially set up company camps along the northern coast to keep watch for any attempts to land Japanese and later practiced amphibious landings. In December, following a directive from the 3rd Division commander, Major General Harold Barrowclough, that officers over the age of 41 were to be retired, the battalion's commanding officer, Seaward, was replaced by Lieutenant Colonel J. F. Moffat. During its time on Vella Lavella, the battalion lost 22 men who were killed in action or died later of wounds. Another 20 were wounded.

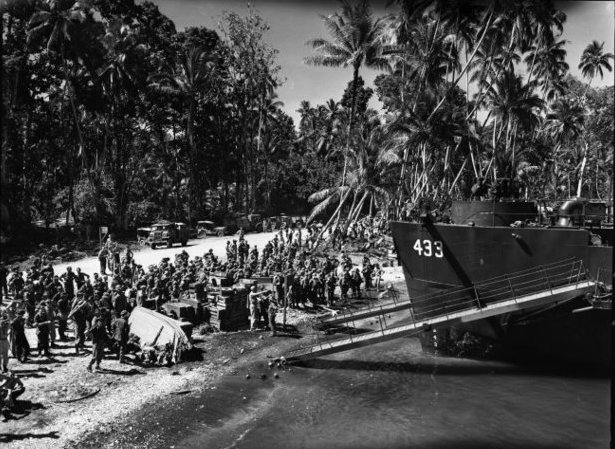
Soldiers of 3rd New Zealand Division loading 'Landing Craft, Infantry' ships on Vella Lavella, in preparation for landing at Nissan Island, 1944

On 16 February 1944, the 35th Battalion landed on Nissan Island, in what would become known as the Battle of the Green Islands. It conducted numerous advances inland and around the island, largely a coral reef, but was mostly unopposed apart from one patrol which contacted a Japanese force of 60 men. The patrol withdrew without losses after inflicting some casualties on the Japanese. It remained on Nissan Island until 31 May 1944 and returned to New Zealand by way of Guadalcanal and New Caledonia.

=== Disbandment ===
By 1944, the New Zealand government had become concerned by the country's reduced industrial manpower and it was decided to recall the 3rd Division. This was done piecemeal by progressively reducing the number of men in each battalion so that if necessary, the division could be quickly rebuilt. The first draft of returnees from the 35th Battalion intended for priority industries began returning to New Zealand in April while the battalion itself arrived back in New Zealand later that year. Much reduced in number, after a 40-day leave, upon reporting to mobilisation centres the remaining members of the battalion found it had been effectively disbanded. While some of the men from the now disbanded 3rd Division remained in New Zealand on home service, many others were posted to the 2nd New Zealand Division as reinforcements.

== Honours ==
Several awards for gallantry were made to members of 35th Battalion, all for actions performed during the Battle of Vella Lavella. Seaward was awarded the Distinguished Service Order for his leadership of the battalion during the battle while Sergeant Thomas Walsh was awarded the Distinguished Conduct Medal for his leadership of patrols on Vella Lavella from late September to early October 1943 that identified several machine gun posts for later targeting by artillery. The battalion chaplain was awarded the Military Cross while a private received the Military Medal. The battalion's regimental quartermaster, Warrant Officer II Robert Buckland, was appointed to the Order of the British Empire for his service during the war.

For its service in the war, the 35th Battalion received four battle honours: "Solomons", "Vella Lavella", "Green Islands", and "South Pacific 1942–44". These honours were never formally awarded as the battalion was not perpetuated.
