= Brian Warner (cricketer) =

New Zealand cricketer

Personal information
- Full name: Brian Henry Warner
- Born: 9 September 1919; Auckland, New Zealand
- Died: 24 January 1968 (aged 48); Auckland, New Zealand
- Batting: Right-handed
- Bowling: Medium
- Role: Batsman
- Source: CricInfo, 26 June 2016

Brian Henry Warner (1919 – 24 January 1968) was a New Zealand cricketer. He played one first-class match for Auckland during the 1944–45 season.

Warner was born at Auckland in 1919 and educated at Auckland Grammar School where he played cricket. Considered both a "fine" wicket-keeper and useful batsman at school, he was selected for Auckland side in the 1937–38 Brabin Cup age-group competition whilst still at school, two centuries in school matches securing his selection. He was one of the first two players from the school to be selected for the age-group side whilst still at school. He played club cricket for Parnell Cricket Club in Auckland where he was considered a "fluent" batsman who could score runs quickly.

Professionally Warner worked as a bank clerk. During World War II he enlisted in the New Zealand Army, reporting for training in early 1941. He served first as a non-commissioned officer before being commissioned in 34 battalion and ending the war with the rank of lieutenant. Whilst serving he played both cricket and rugby for army sides, playing full-back for the Papakura Military Camp side which won the Auckland Rugby Football Union's Gallaher Shield in 1941. Later in the war he played full-back for the Combined Services side and, after the war, for Auckland's B side.

Warner's only first-class cricket match was a wartime fixture between the Auckland representative side and Wellington played in December 1944. With a number of players unavailable, Warner, who was described as a "stylish bat" who could act as reserve wicket-keeper, scored eight runs in his first innings and recorded a duck in his second at the end of a close run chase. Although he did not appear again for Auckland, acting as twelfth man for the following match against Canterbury before being posted overseas towards the end of the 1944–45 season, Warner played Hawke Cup cricket for Nelson during the 1956–57 season.

Warner died at Auckland in 1968. He was aged 48.
