= 8th Brigade (New Zealand) =

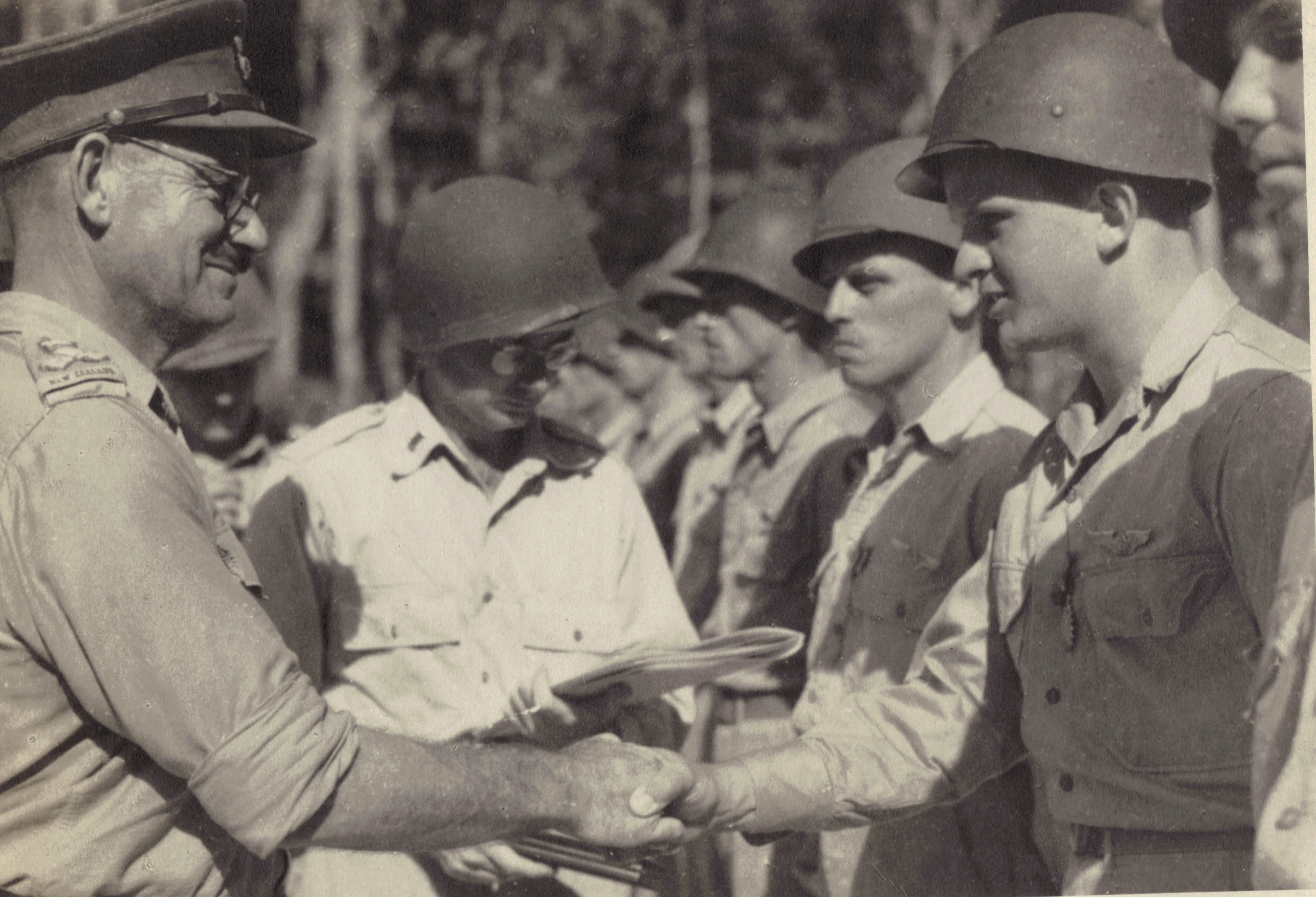
- Brigadier Leonard Goss awards US Staff Sergeant Harry Stickel an Air Medal on Stirling Island, 2 March 1944.
- Active: 1940–44 (Note: Mills' website lists the 8th Brigade as having existed between 1940 and 1943, however, Gillespie specifically mentions the brigade as existing throughout 1944.)
- Country: New Zealand
- Branch: New Zealand Military Forces
- Type: Infantry
- Size: ~3,000 – 3,500 personnel
- Part of: 3rd Division
- Engagements: Second World War: Battle of the Treasury Islands

Commanders
- Notable commanders: William Cunningham; Leonard Goss; Robert Row

The 8th Brigade was a formation of the New Zealand Military Forces, which served during the Second World War as part of the 2nd New Zealand Expeditionary Force. Eventually forming part of the 3rd Division, the brigade served in the Pacific Ocean theatre of the war. Raised in late 1940, initially the brigade was employed on garrison duties on Fiji before returning to New Zealand in mid-1942. In December 1942, it was sent to New Caledonia where they remained until early September 1943, when they moved to Guadalcanal to prepare for operations in the Solomon Islands. The brigade's only combat operation of the war came in October–November 1943, when it captured the Treasury Islands. It was disbanded in late 1944 due to manpower shortages in the New Zealand economy.

== History ==
Established on 20 September 1940, the brigade was raised as a garrison force for the island of Fiji, after New Zealand assumed responsibility for the defence of the island from the United Kingdom. Deploying in October 1940 under the command of Brigadier William Cunningham, it was initially known as "Force B" or the "8th Brigade Group", and consisted of about 3,000 personnel organised into two infantry battalions – the 29th and 30th Battalions – as well as a number of support units. Later, these battalions were joined by the 34th Battalion. Following Japan's entry into the war after the attack on Pearl Harbor and the invasion of Malaya in December 1941, the brigade headquarters was used to raise a divisional headquarters and a new 8th Brigade headquarters was raised in Trentham. On 6 January 1942, now under the command of Brigadier Leonard Goss, it was established at Samambula, in Fiji. At this time, the brigade's composition was altered. The 30th Battalion was transferred to the newly raised 14th Brigade, and the 36th Battalion arrived to join the 29th and 34th Battalions. Elements of the Fiji Defence Force were also attached, as were artillery, engineer and medical support units.

In February, command of the brigade passed to Brigadier Robert Row, although Brigadier F.L Hunt took temporary command for a brief period of time in Row's absence in May 1942. The brigade remained on Fiji to defend it against a possible Japanese invasion until August 1942, when they returned to New Zealand and undertook home defence duties as part of the 3rd Division.

In October 1942, the 34th Battalion was detached from the brigade to garrison Tonga, while 36th Battalion was sent to Norfolk Island as part of N Force; they were replaced by two Territorial Force battalions: the 1st Battalion, New Zealand Scottish Regiment and the Ruahine Regiment. In December 1942, the brigade moved to New Caledonia with the rest of the 3rd Division. In March 1943, the 36th Battalion rejoined the brigade and it reverted to a three battalion formation, consisting of the 29th, 34th and 36th Battalions. In May, these battalions were converted to 'jungle establishments', which saw the reorganisation of most of their heavy weapons into a brigade machine-gun company and the conversion of the support companies into rifle companies. As a result of experience gained through various training exercises conducted during this time, in early August, the decision was made to attach engineer, anti-tank and field artillery support at operational level to each battalion, as they were formed into "battalion combat teams".

The 8th Brigade remained on New Caledonia until early September when they moved to Guadalcanal as the 3rd Division was assigned a combat role in the Solomon Islands campaign. As a part of this campaign, the 8th Brigade – with supporting Royal New Zealand Air Force fighter aircraft as well as engineers and anti-tank, anti-aircraft and field artillery units – took part in the capturing the Treasury Islands in October–November 1943. The Treasuries were a small group of islands that were south of the larger island of Bougainville and were seen by the Allies as a stepping-stone towards landing forces there. For the operation, the brigade was detached from the New Zealand 3rd Division and placed under the operational command of the US 1st Marine Amphibious Corps.

On 27 October, the brigade conducted two amphibious landings on Mono and Stirling Islands. Stirling Island was found to be completely undefended and, as a result, the main landing focused on Mono, where the main part of the estimated 200-man Japanese garrison was believed to be located. Coming ashore around the village of Falamai, the lead battalions – the 29th and 36th – experienced only limited opposition from the islands' defenders as they moved inland through thick scrub. Due to thorough planning by the brigade commander, Row, and effective resourcing, this was quickly overcome and after a determined Japanese counterattack on the 34th Battalion's positions was turned back on the night of 1/2 November, organised Japanese resistance came to an end by 2/3 November. By 12 November, the island was effectively cleared, however, patrols and mopping up actions continued after this. By the end of November the New Zealanders had lost 40 men killed and another 145 wounded, while Japanese losses were 223 killed and eight captured as prisoners of war. After this the brigade garrisoned the islands against a possible Japanese counterattack from the Shortland Islands. On 16 November, the 8th Brigade returned to the operational command of the New Zealand 3rd Division.

In December 1943, Row, who had reached retirement age, was repatriated back to New Zealand and subsequently placed on the retired list. He was replaced as brigade commander by Brigadier L.G Goss, who had previously served as brigade commander before Row. In early 1944, manpower shortages in the New Zealand economy resulted in the decision to disband the units of the 3rd Division. As a result, the 8th Brigade's battalions were slowly reduced as drafts were returned to New Zealand for demobilisation. In early March plans were made for the brigade to undertake a landing at Kavieng, however, this was cancelled. Finally, in May 1944 the brigade was withdrawn back to New Caledonia, where the 3rd Division was being concentrated while its future was being decided. On 20 October 1944, the 3rd Division, along with its various subunits, was disbanded.

== Notes ==
Footnotes

Citations
