= Blanche Harbour =

Natural harbour in the Solomon Islands

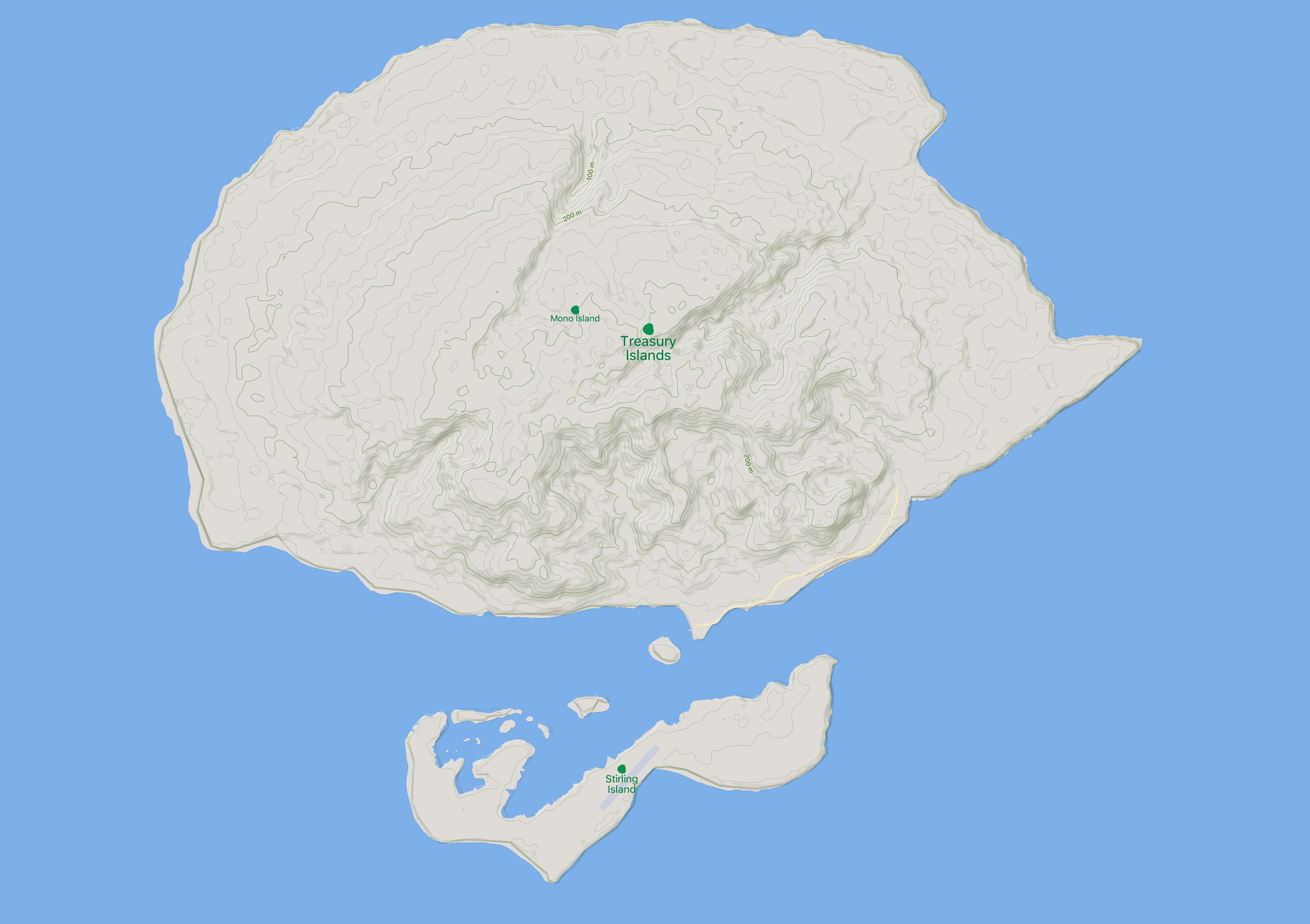
Treasury Islands map, Blanche Harbour is in Blanche Bay between Mono and Stirling islands

Blanche Harbour is a natural harbour between Mono Island and Stirling Island of the Treasury Islands archipelago, located in the Western Province of Solomon Islands, at 7.4°S 155.55°E.
