= Crown prosecutor (New Zealand) =

Legal profession

In New Zealand, a Crown prosecutor is a private lawyer appointed to prosecute indictable offences on behalf of the Crown. Unique for western democracies, New Zealand is the only country to outsource prosecution of serious crimes to the private sector.

== Structure ==
New Zealand, unlike many other jurisdictions, does not directly employ many lawyers to lay prosecutions. The chief law officer, the Attorney-General, is responsible for prosecuting offenders. However, as a Government minister, the Attorney-General will conventionally not involve themself in individual cases. Instead, the work of prosecution has been delegated to the Crown Law Office, headed by the Solicitor-General, who is a senior civil servant rather than a politician. The Crown Law Office, among other duties, supervises the prosecution of major criminal offences. Much of the prosecution work itself is performed by the Crown Solicitors, 17 senior lawyer partners in private law firms, each appointed for a particular district, and lawyers working for them.

Crown prosecutors appear for all prosecutions in the High Court and those in the District Court where the defendant has elected trial by jury; along with all prosecutions which involve crown schedule offences under the Crown Prosecution Regulations 2013, regardless of whether the defendant elects trial by Judge or trial by jury. In most other cases, the Government is often represented by Police prosecutors, or by prosecutors working for the Government department administering the law involved; for example, cases involving tax are often prosecuted by lawyers working for the Inland Revenue Department.
