= N Force =

Military unit of New Zealand during the Second World War

N Force was a small New Zealand Army unit of infantry and artillery that garrisoned the Australian territory of Norfolk Island between October 1942 and February 1944, during the Second World War. The island was considered strategically important due to the cable station there that linked Australia and New Zealand. N Force was formed by detaching units from the 3rd New Zealand Division. An airfield was also constructed for use by Royal New Zealand Air Force (RNZAF) personnel.

At its peak in October 1942, N Force consisted of 1,488 New Zealanders under the command of Lieutenant-Colonel J. W. Barry. At this time N-Force consisted of:

- 36th Battalion (Infantry)
- 152nd Heavy Battery (four 155mm guns)
- Independent Field Artillery Troop (four 25 pounder guns)
- 215th Composite Anti-Aircraft Battery (four 3.7-inch anti-aircraft and eight 40-millimetre guns)
- Engineer, Army Service Corps and Ordnance detachments

The 36th Battalion left Norfolk Island to rejoin the 3rd New Zealand Division on New Caledonia at the end of March 1943. The battalion was replaced by the 2nd Battalion, Wellington-West Coast Regiment. Meanwhile, the strength of N Force was subsequently reduced, and in February 1944 responsibility for Norfolk Island was taken over by the RNZAF. The last New Zealand forces were withdrawn from Norfolk Island in July 1946.
