= 3rd Division (New Zealand) =

WW2 New Zealand Army unit

3rd New Zealand Division
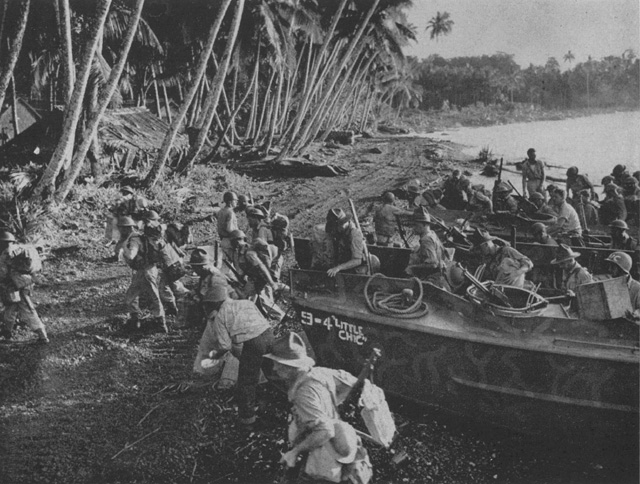
- Soldiers from the New Zealand 3rd Division land on Vella Lavella
- Active: 1942–1944
- Country: New Zealand
- Branch: New Zealand Military Forces
- Size: 17,637 men all ranks
- Engagements: Second World War: Land Battle of Vella Lavella; Battle of the Treasury Islands; Battle of the Green Islands

Commanders
- Notable commanders: Harold Eric Barrowclough; Robert Row

The 3rd New Zealand Division was a division of the New Zealand Military Forces. Formed in 1942, it saw action against the Japanese in the Pacific Ocean Areas during the Second World War. The division saw action in the Solomon Islands campaign during 1943–1944, during which it undertook landings on Vella Lavella, the Treasury Islands and the Green Islands. Due to manpower shortages, for most of its existence the division consisted of only two infantry brigades in addition to support personnel, with its third brigade being disbanded shortly after formation. In 1944, manpower shortages in the New Zealand economy became acute, leading to the disbandment of the division. The majority of its manpower was returned to civilian employment, although around 4,000 men were sent to Italy to reinforce the 2nd Division, seeing further action before the end of the war in May 1945.

== History ==
=== Formation ===
The 3rd New Zealand Division began forming from New Zealand Military Forces units in Fiji in May 1942 and moved to New Zealand in the middle of the year. Major-General Harold Barrowclough was appointed to command the division on 12 August. By October the division consisted of the 8th and 14th Brigades, each of which consisted of three infantry battalions, along with artillery including the 33rd Heavy Coast Regiment, the 28th HAA Regiment, the 29th Light Anti-Aircraft Regiment and anti-tank batteries, two field companies plus a field park of engineers, medical, Army Service Corps and support units.

In October 1942, the 34th and 36th Battalions were detached from the division to garrison Tonga and Norfolk Island respectively. The 36th Battalion was accompanied by detachments from the divisional engineer, artillery and service units as N Force. After completing its initial training in New Zealand the 3rd NZ Division moved to New Caledonia for garrison duty and further training in December 1942 and January 1943. At that time, the third brigade, the 15th, came into being. Each of the brigades consisted of only two battalions, initially, although in March 1943 the New Zealand government approved the expansion of the division to 17,637 men all ranks and decided that the two battalions on Norfolk Island and Tonga would be assigned to the division. Almost immediately, however, manpower became an issue and during the early months of 1943 it became clear that it would not be possible to raise the division to full strength. Indeed, for a while it seemed that the division might be disbanded before it saw active service but its commander, Barrowclough urged the government to allow the division to see active service before any decision was made.

This request was accepted, however, on 30 June 1943 the government announced that the 15th Brigade would be disbanded along with its heavy artillery and anti-aircraft regiments (the 33rd Heavy Coast Regiment and the 28th Heavy Anti-Aircraft Regiment, Royal New Zealand Artillery). This was effected by 10 July 1943, after which the 1st Battalion, Ruahine Regiment, and 1st Battalion, New Zealand Scottish Regiment, were disbanded. Subsequently, the division became a two-brigade division again, although due to Barrowclough's requests, the division retained all three of its engineer companies.

=== Campaign in the Solomon Islands ===
The 3rd NZ Division moved to Guadalcanal in August 1943. From this base, as part of the U.S. I Marine Amphibious Corps (I MAC), the division provided the ground component for three campaigns against small island groups in the Northern Solomons (in all operations the United States Navy provided the naval forces while squadrons from the Royal New Zealand Air Force formed only a small part of the US dominated air forces). While the islands were only lightly held by the Japanese and New Zealand casualties were relatively light, the Kiwi ground troops had to overcome challenging terrain and climatic conditions in these operations.

==== Vella Lavella ====
The 3rd NZ Division's operations on Vella Lavella ran from 21 September to 9 October 1943. The Americans had landed on the island in August, establishing a beachhead in the south. The division's 14th Brigade Group, under Brigadier Leslie Potter, landed at the US base a month later as a follow-on force. Upon arrival, they were given the task of clearing the remaining Japanese forces from the north of the island so that it could be used to establish a radar station and a motor torpedo boat base. The New Zealanders were outnumbered by the defenders, nevertheless, they had been well trained and this training ultimately led to their success. The 35th and 37th Battalions were dispatched along with supporting elements on two axes of advance: one up the east coast, the other up the west. The tactic proved successful and by early October the Japanese defenders were caught in a small pocket by the two New Zealand forces, having killed between 200 and 300 Japanese. Potter, however, failed to capitalise on the situation and due to overcaution the remaining 589 Japanese were able to escape the island on the night of 6/7 October aboard ships of the Imperial Japanese Navy. Total New Zealand casualties in this operation were 32 killed and 32 wounded.

The main units involved were:

- 3rd NZ Division Headquarters
- 14th Brigade Group
  - 30 Battalion
  - 35 Battalion
  - 37 Battalion
  - 17 Field Regiment
  - 207 Light AA Battery
  - 53 Anti-Tank Battery
  - 20 Field Company

==== Treasury Islands ====
The 3rd NZ Division's operations in the Treasury Islands ran from 25 October to 26 November 1943. The 8th Brigade Group, under the command of Brigadier Robert Row, landed on the islands on 27 October in New Zealand's first opposed amphibious operation since Gallipoli in 1915. The initial landing took place on Mono Island, the largest in the group, and after the landing the New Zealanders encountered only scattered opposition from the Japanese defenders, who withdrew to the northern coast of the island. On the night of 1/2 November the Japanese attempted a counterattack, launching a determined attack on the Allied line at Soanotalu. The attack was unsuccessful, however, as reinforcements had just arrived and the Japanese assault was beaten back. The last organised Japanese units were defeated on the night of 2/3 November. New Zealand casualties were 40 killed and 145 wounded.

The main units involved were:

- 8th Brigade Group
  - 29 Battalion
  - 34 Battalion
  - 36 Battalion
  - 38 Field Regiment
  - 29 Light AA Regiment
  - 54 Anti-Tank Battery
  - 23 Field Company

==== Green Islands ====
The 3rd NZ Division's operations in the Green Islands ran from 15 February to 27 February 1944. Like the operation in the Treasury Islands, the heavily reinforced 14th Brigade made an opposed landing on Nissan Island against light Japanese resistance on 15 February. The small Japanese garrison resisted the invasion strongly but was overwhelmed by the much larger New Zealand force, with organised resistance coming to an end on 23 February. New Zealand casualties were 10 killed and 21 wounded.

The main units involved were:

- 3rd NZ Division Headquarters
- Divisional Signals Regiment
- 3rd NZ Division Tank Squadron (Valentine tanks)
- Divisional Artillery
  - 17 Field Regiment
  - 29 Light AA Regiment
  - 144 Independent Battery
  - 53 Anti-Tank Battery
- Divisional Engineers
  - 20 Field Company
  - 26 Field Company
- 14th Infantry Brigade
  - 30 Battalion
  - 35 Battalion
  - 37 Battalion

=== Disbandment ===
In early 1944, the New Zealand Government faced a manpower crisis caused by the demands of maintaining two divisions overseas while simultaneously maintaining agricultural and industrial production to meet the needs of the Allied countries. In order to cope with this crisis the NZ Government saw no option other than to disband one of the country's two infantry divisions. The decision to disband the 3rd NZ Division was made after consulting with the British and United States governments, who were of the view that 2nd NZ Division's contribution to the campaign in Italy was of greater importance than 3rd NZ Division's contribution in the Pacific.

The 3rd NZ Division was withdrawn to New Caledonia in June 1944 and returned to New Zealand in August. The division was rapidly downsized and was formally disbanded on 20 October 1944. About 4,000 veterans of the 3rd NZ Division were dispatched to Italy to reinforce the 2nd NZ Division with the remaining men of the division returning to civilian employment.

== Order of battle ==
In October 1942, the main elements of the 3rd NZ Division were:

- Divisional Headquarters
- 8 Infantry Brigade
  - 29 Battalion
  - 34 Battalion
  - 36 Battalion
- 14 Infantry Brigade
  - 30 Battalion
  - 35 Battalion
  - 37 Battalion
- Divisional Artillery
  - 17 Field Regiment
  - 33 Heavy Coast Regiment
  - 28 Heavy Anti-Aircraft Regiment
  - 29 Light Anti-Aircraft Regiment
  - 144 Independent Battery
  - 53 Anti-Tank Battery
  - 54 Anti-Tank Battery
- Divisional Engineers
  - 20 Field Company
  - 23 Field Company
  - 37 Field Park
- No. 1 Signals Company
- Army Service Corps
  - 4 ASC Company
  - 16 ASC Company
  - 10 Reserve Mechanical Transport Company
- Medical
  - 7 Field Ambulance
  - 22 Field Ambulance
  - 4 General Hospital

This organisation was altered for the campaign in the Solomon Islands. Most notably, an armoured regiment was added to the division in December 1942 (this unit was reduced to a squadron in June 1943) and the heavy coast artillery regiment was replaced by a field artillery regiment.

== Histories ==
Thirteen unofficial histories of New Zealand in the Pacific were produced by the Third Division Histories Committee and published by A.H. & A.W. Reed, Wellington. The number is on the first page before title page (in a numbering error, there were two of No 4 and no No 6). They are all online at the New Zealand Electronic Texts website. The titles are as follows:

- 1. Shovel, Sword and Scalpel: A Record of Service of Medical Units of the Second New Zealand Expeditionary Force in the Pacific (1945)
- 2. Pacific Pioneers: The Story of the Engineers of the New Zealand Expeditionary Force in the Pacific
- 3. Base Wallahs: The Story of the Units of the Base Organisation, NZEF IP
- 4. Headquarters: A Brief Outline of the Activities of Headquarters of the Third Division and the 8th and 14th Brigades During their Service in the Pacific
- 4. Stepping Stones to the Solomons: The Unofficial History of the 29th Battalion with the Second New Zealand Expeditionary Force in the Pacific (1947)
- 5. The 35th Battalion
- 7. Story of the 34th: The Unofficial History of a New Zealand Infantry Battalion with the Third Division in the Pacific (1947)
- 8. Pacific Service: The Story of the New Zealand Army Service Corps Units with the Third Division in the Pacific
- 9. Pacific Kiwis: Being the Story of the Service in the Pacific of the 30th Battalion, Third Division, Second New Zealand Expeditionary Force
- 10. Pacific Saga: The Personal Chronicle of the 37th Battalion and its Part in the Third Division's Campaign
- 11. The Gunners: An Intimate Record of Units of the 3rd New Zealand Divisional Artillery in the Pacific from 1940 until 1945 (1948)
- 12. Tanks, MMGs and Ordnance
- 13 The 36th Battalion: A Record of Service of the 36th Battalion with the Third Division in the Pacific (1946)

A further work, Pacific Commandos: New Zealanders and Fijians in Action: A History of Southern Independent Commando and First Commando Fiji Guerrillas, was rejected for publication as part of the series, but was later accepted for publishing as a one-off work.
