= SS President Jackson =

SS President Jackson may refer to:

- SS President Jackson (1921), a Design 1029 ship originally launched as SS Silver State; renamed President Jackson in 1923; became United States Navy transport USS Zeilin (AP-9/APA-3) during World War II; scrapped in 1948
- SS President Jackson (1950); served as USNS Barrett (T-AP-196) during the Korean and Vietnam Wars; renamed TS Empire State V as a training ship for State University of New York Maritime College (1973–1990); scrapped in 2007
