= Harold Barrowclough =

New Zealand general and judge

Major General The Right Honourable Sir Harold Barrowclough KCMG CB DSO & Bar MC ED
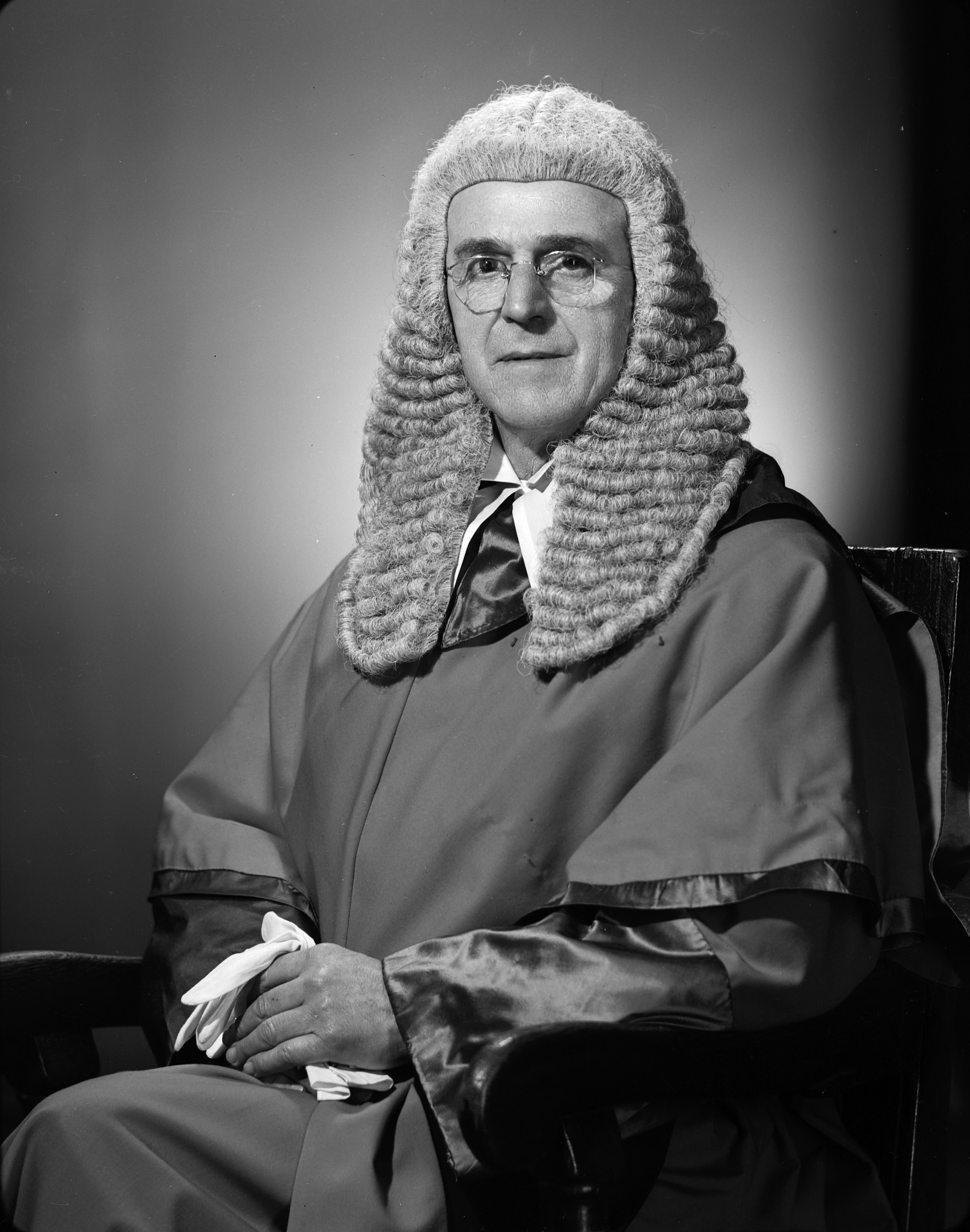
- Barrowclough, c. 1954

8th Chief Justice of New Zealand
- In office 17 November 1953 – 17 January 1966
- Nominated by: Sidney Holland
- Appointed by: The Lord Norrie
- Preceded by: Humphrey O'Leary
- Succeeded by: Richard Wild

Personal details
- Born: 23 June 1894 Masterton, New Zealand
- Died: 4 March 1972 (aged 77) Auckland, New Zealand

Military service
- Branch/service: New Zealand Military Forces
- Years of service: 1913–1931; 1940–1945
- Rank: Major General
- Commands: Northern Division; 3rd Division
- Battles/wars: First World War; Western Front; Second World War; Battle of Greece; Operation Crusader; Solomon Islands campaign
- Awards: Knight Commander of the Order of St Michael and St George; Companion of the Order of the Bath; Distinguished Service Order & Bar; Military Cross; Efficiency Decoration; Mentioned in dispatches (2); Croix de Guerre (France); War Cross (Greece); Legion of Merit (United States)

Major General Sir Harold Eric Barrowclough KCMG, CB, DSO & Bar, MC, ED, PC (23 June 1894 – 4 March 1972) was a New Zealand military leader, lawyer and Chief Justice from 1953 to 1966.

Born in Masterton, Barrowclough commenced legal studies in 1913 and joined the Territorial Force the same year. In 1915, partway through his law degree, he volunteered for service abroad with the New Zealand Expeditionary Force and fought on the Western Front. He finished the First World War in command of a battalion in the New Zealand Rifle Brigade. After the war he finished his law studies and became a successful lawyer. He also resumed duty in the Territorial Force, serving until 1931 when he moved to Auckland to join a law firm based there.

Following the outbreak of the Second World War Barrowclough volunteered for service with the Second New Zealand Expeditionary Force (2NZEF). He commanded an infantry brigade in the 2nd New Zealand Division during the campaign in Greece and Operation Crusader. In 1942, he was recommended for divisional command by his superior officer, Major General Bernard Freyberg, and was given the 3rd Division, which he led through the Solomon Islands campaign. When the division was disbanded in late 1944, he was left without a command and was eventually discharged from the 2NZEF. He returned to the legal profession, and in 1953 was appointed Chief Justice of New Zealand. He established a permanent Court of Appeal for New Zealand and also served on the Privy Council for a time. He retired in 1966 and died in Auckland in 1972 at the age of 77.

== Early life ==
Harold Eric Barrowclough was born at Masterton, New Zealand, on 23 June 1894, the son of a civil engineer, Alfred Barrowclough, and his wife. In later life, his father took up teaching. Educated at Palmerston North Boys' High School, he performed well both academically and in sports. He was prefect and won a university scholarship in 1912. The following year he began law studies at the University of Otago. He also joined the Territorial Force.

== First World War ==
In the early stages of the First World War, Barrowclough volunteered for service in the New Zealand Expeditionary Force (NZEF), enlisting as a private in January 1915. He showed leadership potential and within four months had been commissioned as a second lieutenant. He departed for overseas service in October 1915 having been promoted to lieutenant and posted to the New Zealand Rifle Brigade. He saw brief service during the Senussi campaign in the Middle East with the 2nd Battalion of the brigade.

In 1916, with the Rifle Brigade now serving on the Western Front as part of the New Zealand Division, Barrowclough was regarded as an outstanding officer and in March was promoted to captain. Three months later he was appointed commander of a company in the battalion. In September 1916, he won a Military Cross for his actions during the Battle of the Somme when he led a party in an attack on a German strong point and linked up with the neighbouring British 47th Division. He was also awarded the Croix de Guerre for the same action.

Wounded in the back in June 1917, he was invalided to England to convalesce. Upon recovery, he commanded reserve battalions at the NZEF bases in England. He returned to France in March 1918 as a temporary major and took up command of a company. By this stage of the war, he had been recommended for command of a battalion. In August 1918, he was promoted to the rank of lieutenant colonel and appointed commander of 4th Battalion, New Zealand Rifle Brigade. A month later, during the Hundred Days Offensive, he was awarded a Distinguished Service Order (DSO) for his leadership when dealing with a German counterattack near Havrincourt Wood. The citation for his DSO appeared in The London Gazette in January 1919 and reads as follows:

For conspicuous gallantry and able leadership near Havrincourt Wood from 8th to 13th September, 1918. He was in command of a battalion up against a strong position stoutly defended by the enemy. He gained good information from personal reconnaissances, during one of which the enemy counter-attacked. He rallied his men, and, leading them forward, drove back the enemy with bomb and bayonet.

In the capture of Le Quesnoy, the New Zealand Division's last action of the war, he led his battalion over the ramparts of Le Quesnoy. He was later mentioned in dispatches for his role in this engagement. While the New Zealand Division was on occupation duty in Germany, he coordinated an education programme for its soldiers until he returned to New Zealand and was discharged from the NZEF.

== Interwar period ==
Resuming his legal studies at Otago, Barrowclough graduated with a law degree in 1921 and set up practice in Dunedin. He later lectured part-time in law. He rejoined the Territorial Force, and from 1924 to 1929 commanded the 1st Battalion, Otago Regiment. In 1930, he was promoted to colonel and given command of the 3rd Infantry Brigade. He resigned from the Territorial Force in 1931 when he accepted an offer of a partnership in the Auckland law firm Russell, McVeagh, Bagnall and Macky. He quickly developed a high profile in the Auckland law establishment.

By the mid-1930s, Barrowclough was disenchanted with the state of New Zealand's military forces, which was in decline due to a lack of resources and the discontinuation of compulsory military training. In 1936, he encouraged the reformation of the National Defence League of New Zealand (NDL), a defence lobby group which aimed to encourage and revitalise New Zealand's defence preparations for war. The country's defence arrangements were in a poor state of affairs at the time but the NDL gained little traction with the Labour Government.

== Second World War ==
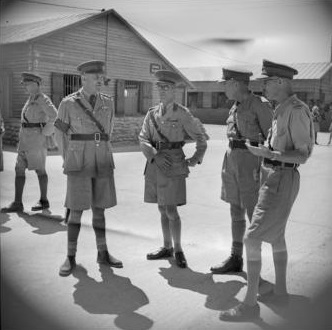
Brigadier Reginald Miles (left front, with arm band), Harold Barrowclough (centre) and Graham Parkinson (2nd right) await a medal ceremony, Maadi, Egypt. Major General Bernard Freyberg is at the extreme left.

=== Greece and North Africa ===
Prior to the outbreak of the Second World War, Barrowclough volunteered his services for the New Zealand Military Forces and his offer was duly taken up when the Second New Zealand Expeditionary Force (2NZEF), commanded by Major General Bernard Freyberg, was raised for service in the war. When the 2nd New Zealand Division was formed in 1940, he was promoted to brigadier and appointed commander of its 6th Infantry Brigade. Embarking from New Zealand in May 1940, he spent the next four months in England, commanding elements of the 2nd New Zealand Division which had been diverted there while en route to the Middle East, his own brigade continuing to Egypt as planned.

Barrowclough rejoined the 6th Infantry Brigade in October 1940 and, disappointed with its quality, put considerable emphasis on training. This meant that it generally performed well during the campaign in Greece in April 1941. After the conclusion of the fighting in Greece, he refused to join in the criticism directed by some senior officers of the 2nd New Zealand Division at Freyberg's leadership during the battle. He later fought in Operation Crusader, the campaign to lift the siege of Tobruk. At one point in the battle, his brigade captured elements of the headquarters of the Afrika Korps. However, he was impetuous in his efforts to capture Point 175, a strategically important hill to the south of Tobruk, and this led to heavy losses in one of the battalions of his brigade. Although Point 175 was seized, Barrowclough's brigade was only able to hold it for a few days before being forced to withdraw due to German attacks. He received a bar to his DSO for his leadership during the Crusader offensive, having already been awarded the Greek War Cross and a mention in despatches for his work in Greece.

=== Pacific ===
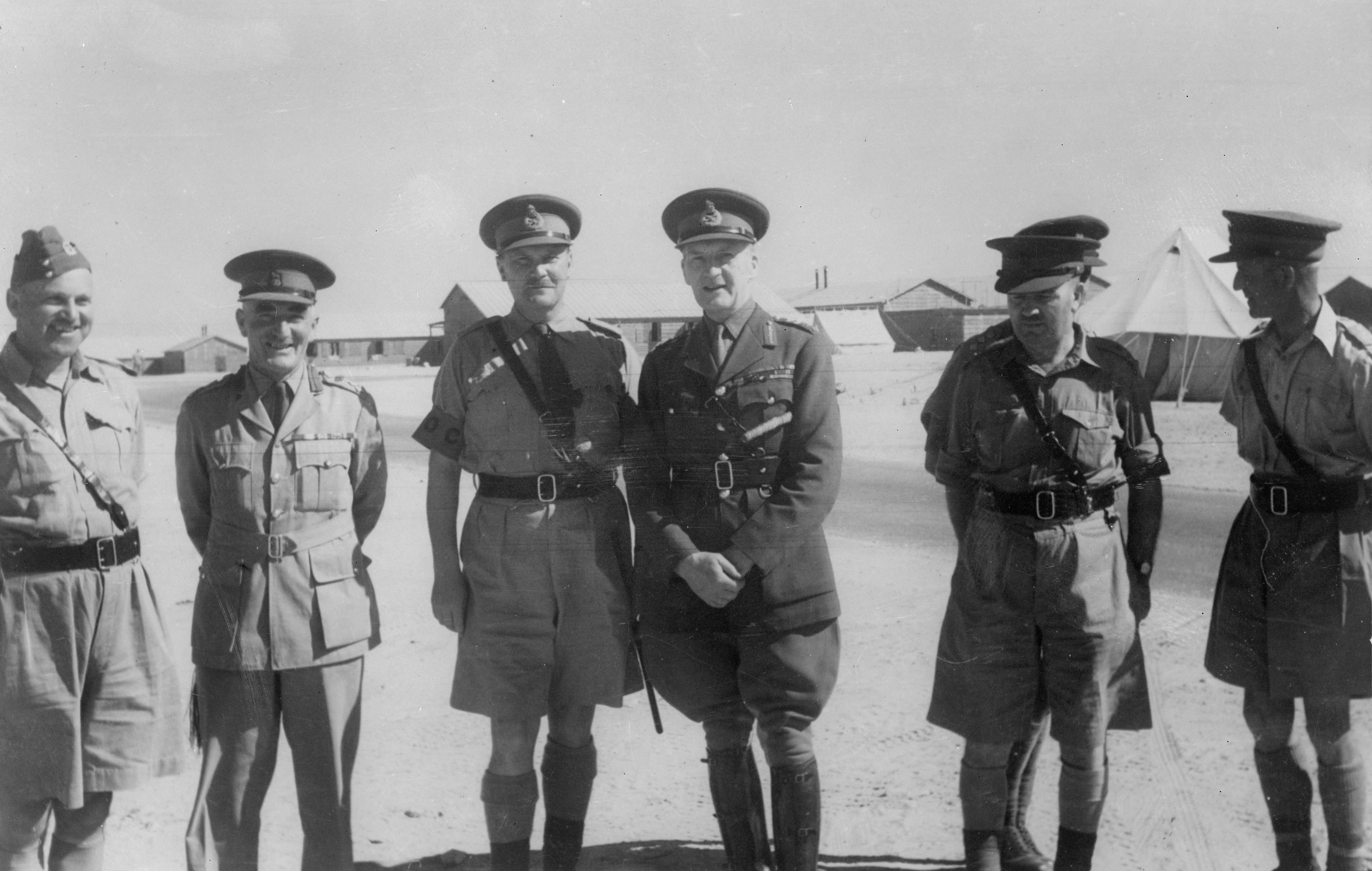
General Sir John Dill, British Chief of the Imperial General Staff, visits Maadi Camp, Egypt. From left to right: Brigadiers R. Miles and E. Puttick, Major General Freyberg and General Dill, Brigadiers J. Hargest and H. E. Barrowclough

In response to a request from the New Zealand government, Barrowclough was nominated by Freyberg for command of the Pacific Section of 2NZEF, which was based in Fiji. With the entry of Imperial Japan into the war, this was an important command as Fiji was the last line of defence for mainland New Zealand. Barrowclough embarked for New Zealand in early 1942 but during his transit, the commanding officer of the Pacific Section became seriously ill and was invalided home to be immediately replaced by Major General Owen Mead. On Barrowclough's arrival in New Zealand, he was disappointed to find that his expected command was no longer available. He was eventually posted as the commander of the Northern Division with the rank of major general. He was responsible for the defence of the upper North Island, and for the next few months oversaw the reorganisation and training of his new command.

Barrowclough's opportunity for a return to duty overseas came following the death of Mead in an aircraft crash in July 1942. At the time of Mead's death, the Pacific Section was being recalled to New Zealand for reorganisation into a division for offensive operations in the South Pacific. In August, Barrowclough was named as commander of what was now known as the 3rd New Zealand Division. He immediately overhauled its structure and removed many officers who he considered too old for frontline duty, replacing them with personnel who had experience with the 2NZEF in Greece, Crete or North Africa. He also implemented training programs for his new command; most of its personnel had been engaged in the construction of fortifications while in Fiji, which had left little opportunity for intensive tactical training and exercises.

In response to a request from Vice Admiral Robert L. Ghormley, the American commander of the South Pacific Area, the 3rd Division moved to New Caledonia on garrison duty while the American forces previously stationed there fought in the Battle of Guadalcanal. Conscious that his division was the only sizeable non-American unit in a theatre of operations having an overall American command structure, Barrowclough requested, and received, a charter that allowed him to seek instructions from the New Zealand Government if he felt the division was to be involved in operations that could result in significant casualties.

Although Barrowclough arrived in New Caledonia with his divisional headquarters in November 1942, the main body of his command was not in place until January 1943. Once on the island, his division began training in amphibious landings and jungle warfare to prepare it for forthcoming offensive operations while he set about dealing with the administrative and logistical problems of integrating the division into the American command structure. The 3rd Division was a division in name only, consisting of two infantry brigades – the 8th and 14th – instead of the three of a conventional infantry division, and he unsuccessfully agitated for expansion. New Zealand could not supply enough manpower to have two full infantry divisions in the field, and the government's preference was to retain the 2nd New Zealand Division, still in North Africa, at full strength. Barrowclough was unhappy at this decision and his relationship with Army headquarters in Wellington and its chief of staff, Lieutenant General Edward Puttick, became strained. The two brigade divisional structure also constrained how the 3rd Division could be employed in offensive operations, as it could not be used as a replacement for an American division due to its reduced number of personnel. Being the only unit in the South Pacific Area outside of the American supply chain also caused logistical problems as the division used British equipment.

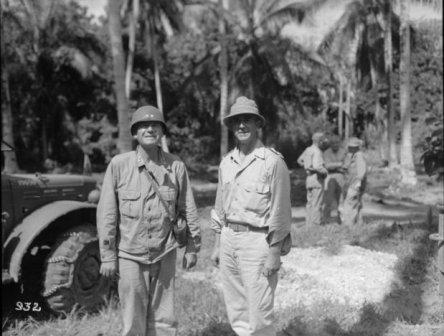
Barrowclough (right), with Major General Oscar Griswold, commander of U. S. XIV Corps, Vella Lavella, 1943.

In August 1943, Barrowclough was advised that his division was to participate in the Solomon Islands campaign. It would eventually participate in three major amphibious operations. The first of these was in September 1943, when the 14th Brigade conducted a series of landings around the coast of Vella Lavella during the Battle of Vella Lavella. It was a satisfactory performance by the New Zealanders and Barrowclough was congratulated by American commanders for the division's work.

This was followed in October 1943 by the Battle of the Treasury Islands, involving the 8th Brigade and which was the first amphibious landing mounted under fire by New Zealand forces since the Gallipoli landing in 1915. This, like the operations at Vella Lavella, was a success with the Japanese opposition being quickly suppressed. In early 1944, Barrowclough commanded a force of nearly 16,500 men during the Battle of the Green Islands, only a third of which were elements of his own division. The remainder were American forces.

Ever since the formation of the 3rd Division, Barrowclough had been aware that New Zealand's ability to keep it and the 2nd New Zealand Division in the field was limited. However, so long as the Japanese posed a threat to New Zealand's security, there was still political will for the 3rd Division to be maintained. With the Japanese no longer a meaningful concern to the country, New Zealand's increasing shortage of manpower resulted in the disbandment of the 3rd Division. As well as providing reinforcements for the 2nd New Zealand Division, at the time engaged in fighting in Italy, it allowed men to return to vital industries in New Zealand.

Despite protests from Barrowclough, the disbandment began in April 1944, with a contingent of nearly 1,900 men returning to New Zealand with more following over the next few months. By June 1944, what was left of the division was in New Caledonia, having been withdrawn there after the Battle of the Green Islands. In September, the disbandment was made official and was officially completed the following month. This left a demoralised Barrowclough without a command. He hoped for a suitable position with the 2nd New Zealand Division, possibly taking over from Freyberg. This did not eventuate and instead he was sent to the British Army's 21st Army Group as an observer. In late 1945, he was discharged from the military. His service in the Pacific theatre of operations was rewarded with several decorations, which included the United States Legion of Merit and appointment as a Companion of the Order of the Bath.

== Later life ==
After he left the military, Barrowclough returned to his legal career. His law firm had suffered during the war years through a lack of manpower and the rebuilding of his practice occupied much of his time. In 1953, he moved to Wellington to take up an appointment as Chief Justice of New Zealand, and was awarded the Queen Elizabeth II Coronation Medal. The following year, he received an honorary doctorate in law from Otago. He also became a member of the Privy Council, was appointed a Knight Commander of the Order of St Michael and St George and was knighted by Queen Elizabeth II during her visit to New Zealand in 1954. While Chief Justice, he established the permanent Court of Appeal of New Zealand. After his retirement in January 1966, Barrowclough returned to Auckland where he died on 4 March 1972 at the age of 77. His cremation took place at Purewa Cemetery and Crematorium. He was survived by three children. His wife, Mary, who he had married in 1921, predeceased him in 1964.

In his will Barrowclough left money to the University of Otago, to establish a scholarship for law students. In 2009, Palmerston North Boys' High School, Barrowclough's former school, implemented leadership and achievement programs named in his honour.

== Notes ==
Legal offices
Preceded by Humphrey O'Leary	Chief Justice of New Zealand; 1953–1966	Succeeded by Richard Wild
