= Treasury Islands =

Island group in Solomon Islands

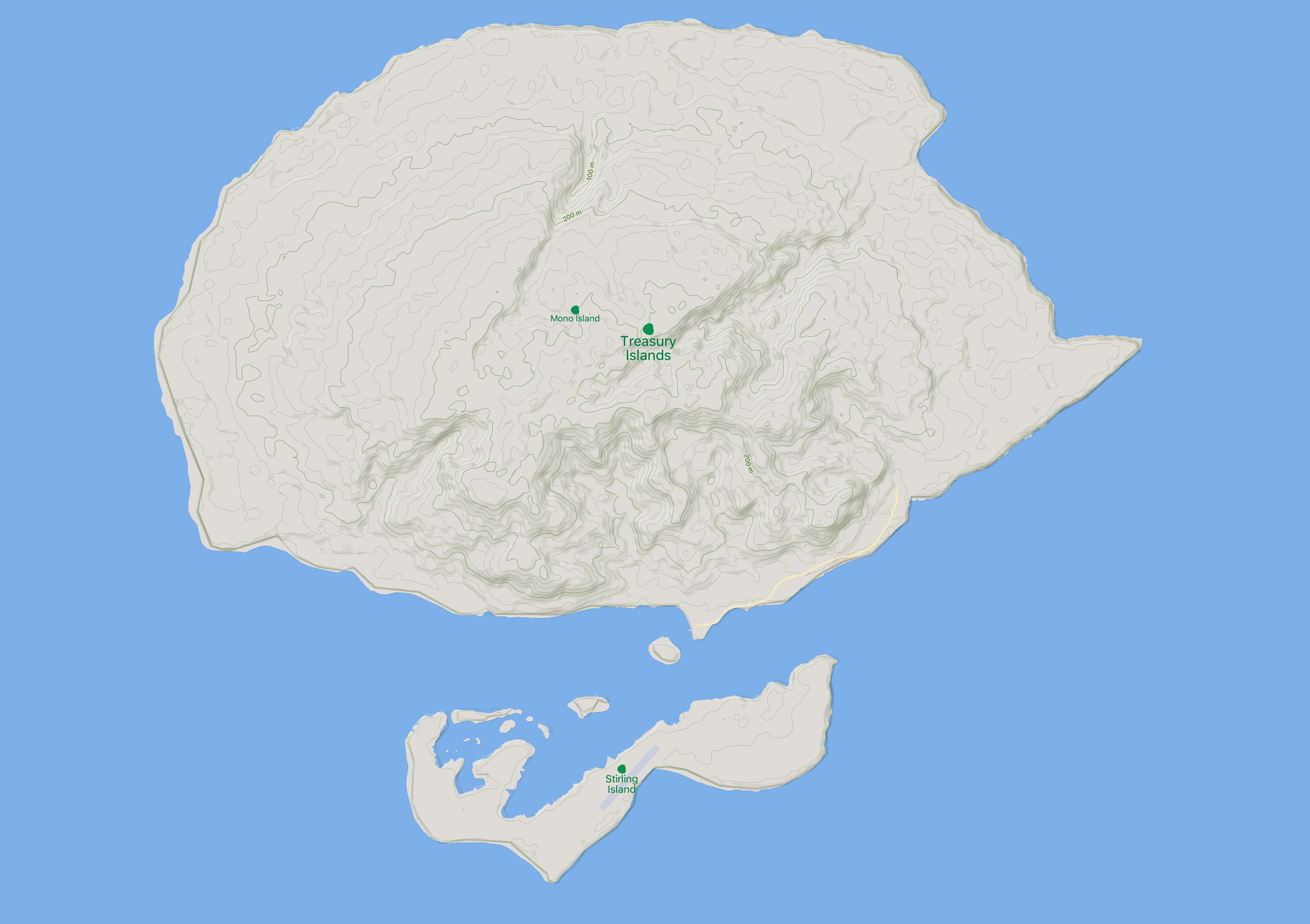
Treasury Islands, showing Mono at top, Stirling under.

Treasury Islands (7°23′15″S 155°33′30″E) are a small group of islands a few kilometres to the south of Bougainville and 24 kilometres (15 miles) from the Shortland Islands. They form part of the Western Province of the country of Solomon Islands. The two largest islands in the Treasuries are Mono Island and the smaller Stirling Island. The deep water strait between these two islands is called Blanche Harbour.

== History ==
=== Early history ===
These islands were first discovered in 1788 by British Royal Navy officer Lieutenant John Shortland. In 1886, the islands were included in German New Guinea save for Mono Island, which the Britain claimed as its naval coaling base. In 1899, the islands were included in the British Solomon Islands Protectorate to be administered as part of Western District.

=== World War II ===
During World War II the islands were held by the Japanese until 25–27 October 1943, when the islands were invaded via amphibious assault by units of the New Zealand 8th Brigade. Following the invasion, an airstrip was built on the flatter Stirling Island by the USN 87th Construction battalion. This airfield was then used to support a campaign to neutralize Japanese air power at Rabaul. Stirling airfield is still in use today by Solomon Airlines.
