= Mono Island =

Island of the Treasury Islands, Solomon Islands

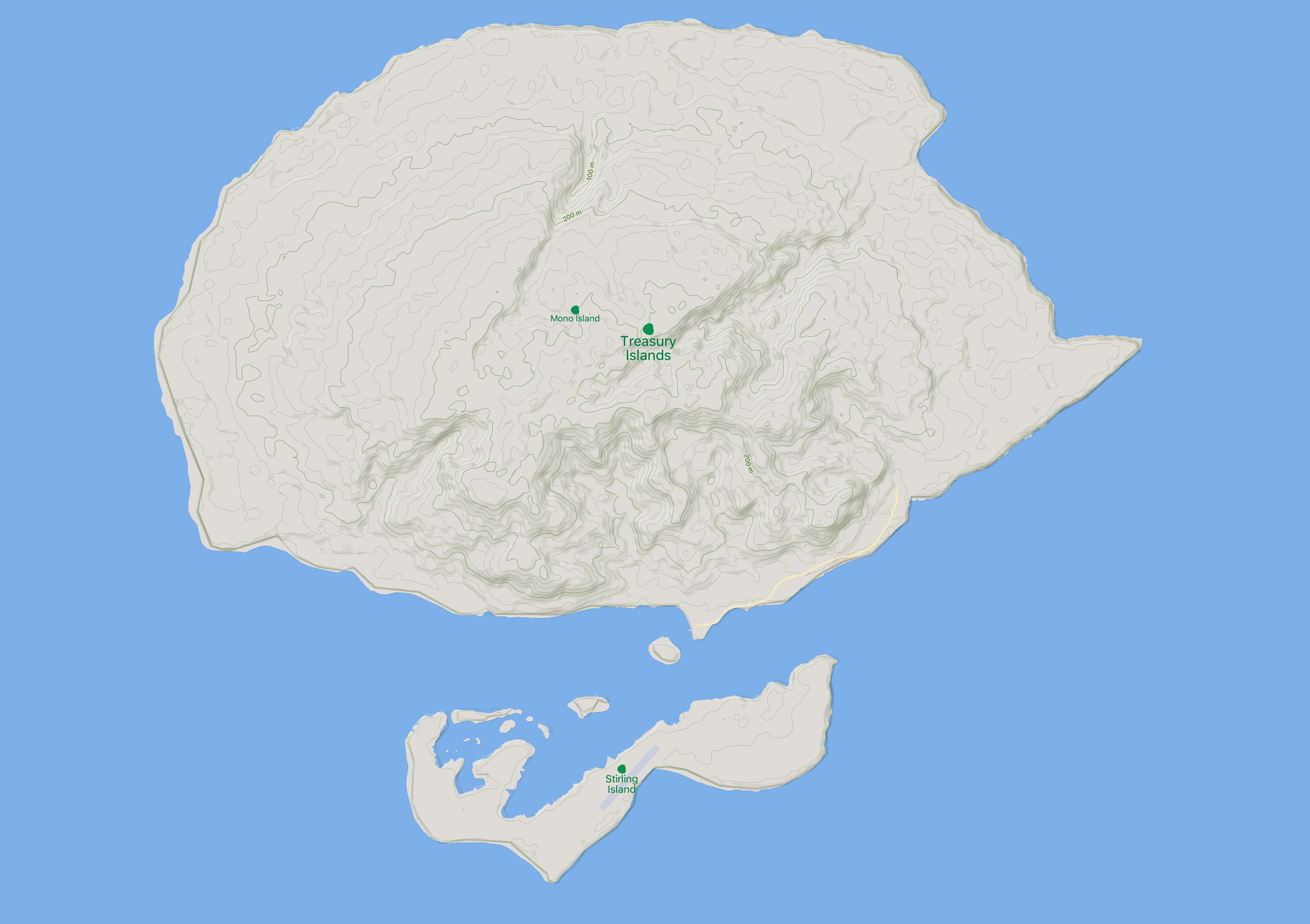
Treasury Islands, Mono at top, Stirling bottom

Mono Island is the largest island of the Treasury Islands, Solomon Islands, at 7°21′S 155°34′E.

== Geography ==
Mono island is a volcanic island in the northwest of Solomon Islands. It is separated by the Blanche Harbour from Stirling Island and the other coral islands surrounding it. The village of Falamai is the main population centre of the island. The island is rimmed by limestone cliffs of more than twenty metres in height. The island's population is around 1,800.

The earthquake of April 1, 2007, and the tsunami following the earthquake caused considerable damage in Mono. Five houses and all school buildings collapsed and four people were reported missing.

== History ==
=== European discovery ===
The island is thought to have been sighted by Bougainville on 28 June 1768.

Mono and Stirling Island were encountered in 1788 by Shortland who named them the Treasury Islands.

Whaling vessels sometimes visited the islands in the nineteenth century.

By the 1880s, the native population of Mono was about 500. Apart from their own language, some spoke Fijian and a little English was also spoken. Many of the men at that time left the island on labour vessels to work on plantations at Fiji and elsewhere in the Pacific.

=== World War II ===
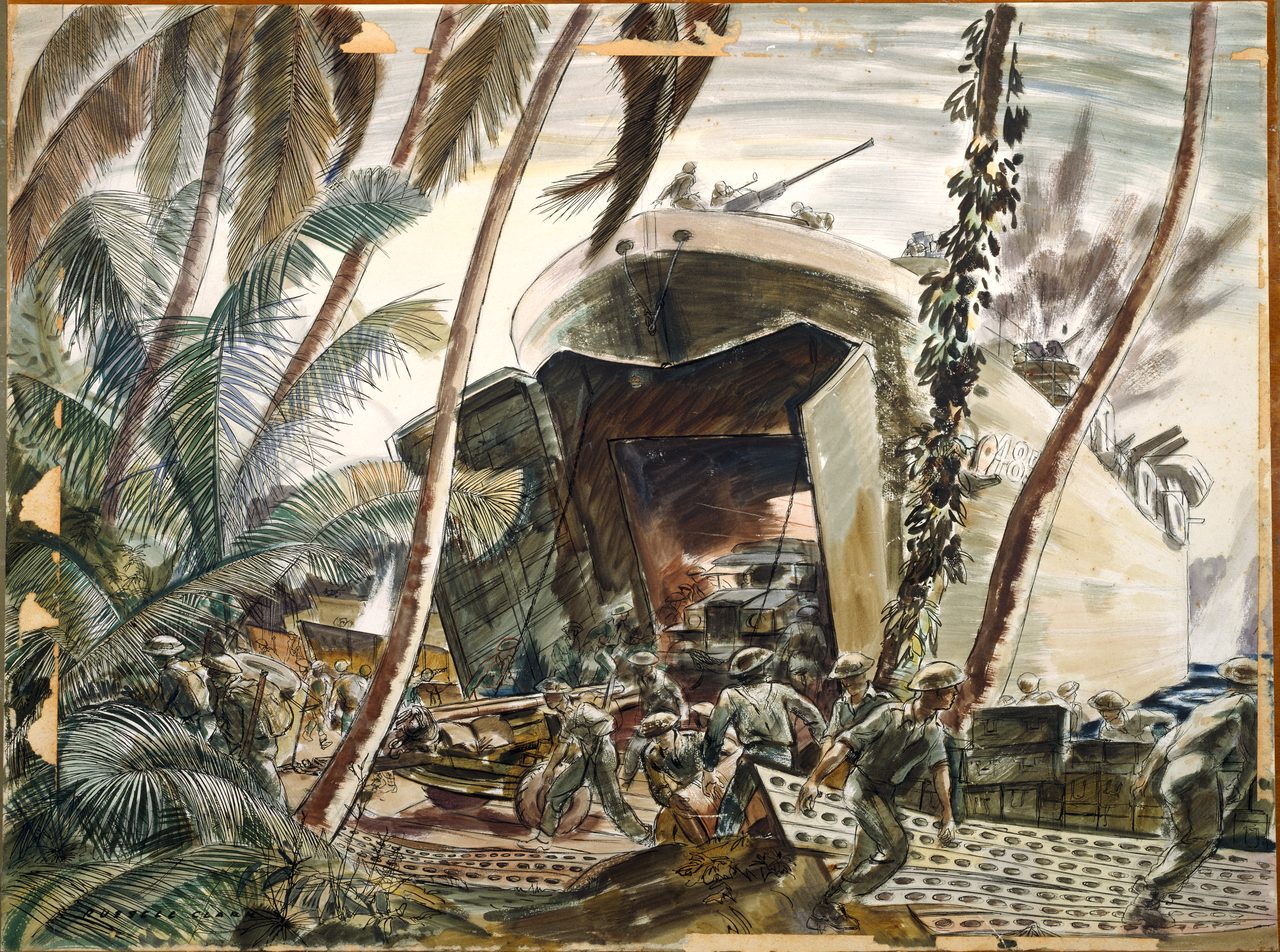
Landing Ships Under Fire, Treasury Island, 1943, by Russell Clark.

The Japanese had occupied Mono during their invasion of the Solomons. On October 27, 1943, the 8th Brigade of the Third New Zealand Division and the U.S. 87th Navy Construction Battalion landed at two locations: at Falamai (site of the Japanese HQ on the island) in the south, and at Purple Beach at Soanotalu in the north. By November 7 the island was under Allied control. Twelve Americans and forty New Zealanders were killed during the campaign. For the New Zealanders, it was the first opposed amphibious operation since Gallipoli.

Stirling Island was turned into a huge airstrip by the Allies, which was left deserted after the war ended.

== Tourism ==
Mono Island is a diving paradise and is from time to time a port of call for cruising ships.
