= Stirling Island =

Island in Solomon Islands

Coordinates: 7.411944°S 155.575278°E

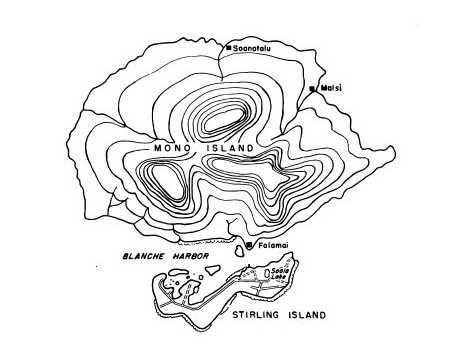
Map of the Treasury Islands with Stirling on the bottom

Stirling Island (also Sterling Island) is the smaller island of the two main Treasury Islands, which form part of the Solomon Islands.

== Geography ==
Stirling is about four miles (6.4 km) long and located some 17 miles (27 km) south of Shortland. The estimated terrain elevation above sea level is 35 metres (115 ft). Stirling Island is separated from the largest Mono Island by Blanche Harbour. Stirling Island is composed of coral which was once part of the barrier reef surrounding Mono Island.

== Population ==
Stirling Island has no permanent population. However an airfield and other remnants of World War II Allied base still remain here.

== Air base ==
Stirling Island airfield, Treasury Island

After the Allied Forces landed on Stirling, it became evident that the island was perfect for an airfield because the island was naturally flat, coral surfaced, with fresh water and good landing beaches locating nearby. A reconnaissance team from the 87th Naval Construction Battalion "Seabees" arrived on Stirling on November 1, 1943, to study the site, and four days later filed a favorable report about the area. Based on this report, a construction of a bomber strip "W", originally planned for Bougainville Island was initiated here.

In May 2011, Solomon Islands Prime Minister Danny Phillip repeated offers to the Australian Government to make the disused air base available to host the processing of asylum seekers. It is believed that negotiations reached a reasonably advanced state before being discontinued.
