= Nessadiou =

- Neighborhood
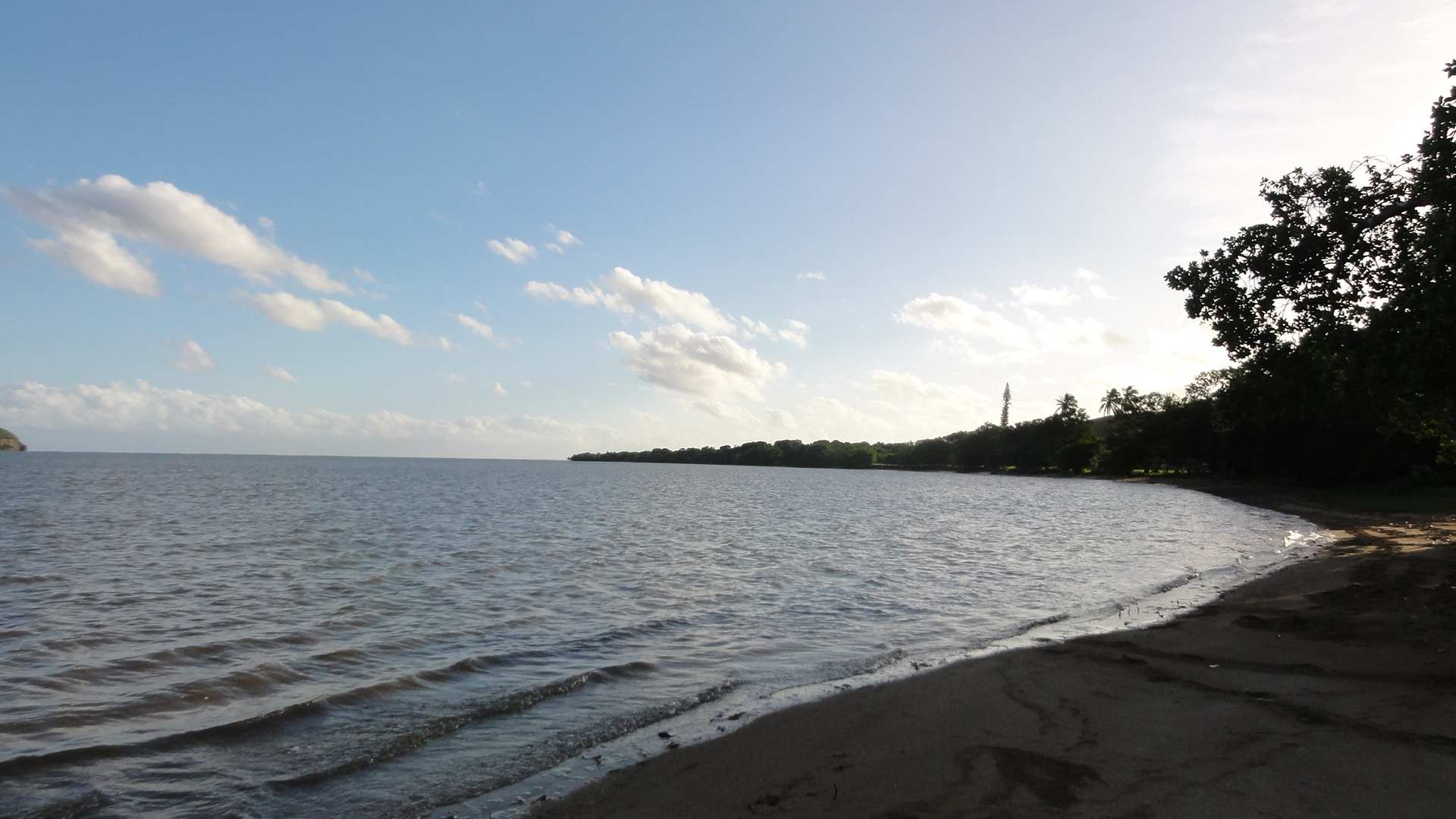
- Interactive map of Nessadiou
- Coordinates: 21°37′46″S 165°31′19″E
- Country: France
- Sui generis collectivity: New Caledonia
- Province: South Province
- Commune: Bourail
- Postal code: 98870

Nessadiou is a neighborhood of the commune Bourail in the South Province of New Caledonia.

The residents are mostly from Algeria. Between 1867 and 1869, 200 convicts sentenced to forced labor stayed on the Isle of Pines, Isle of Ducos, and Nessadiou. Around one hundred people from Kabylia were deported to the Isle of Pines in 1873. From 1887 to 1897, 1,200 convicts, mostly Algerians, were sent to New Caledonia. The largest community is concentrated in Nessadiou. Following the amnesty of 1895, few remained in the colony. At that time, five former Arab deportees were recorded in Bourail, three of whom had settled in Nessadiou.

== Gallery ==
Some views of Nessadiou

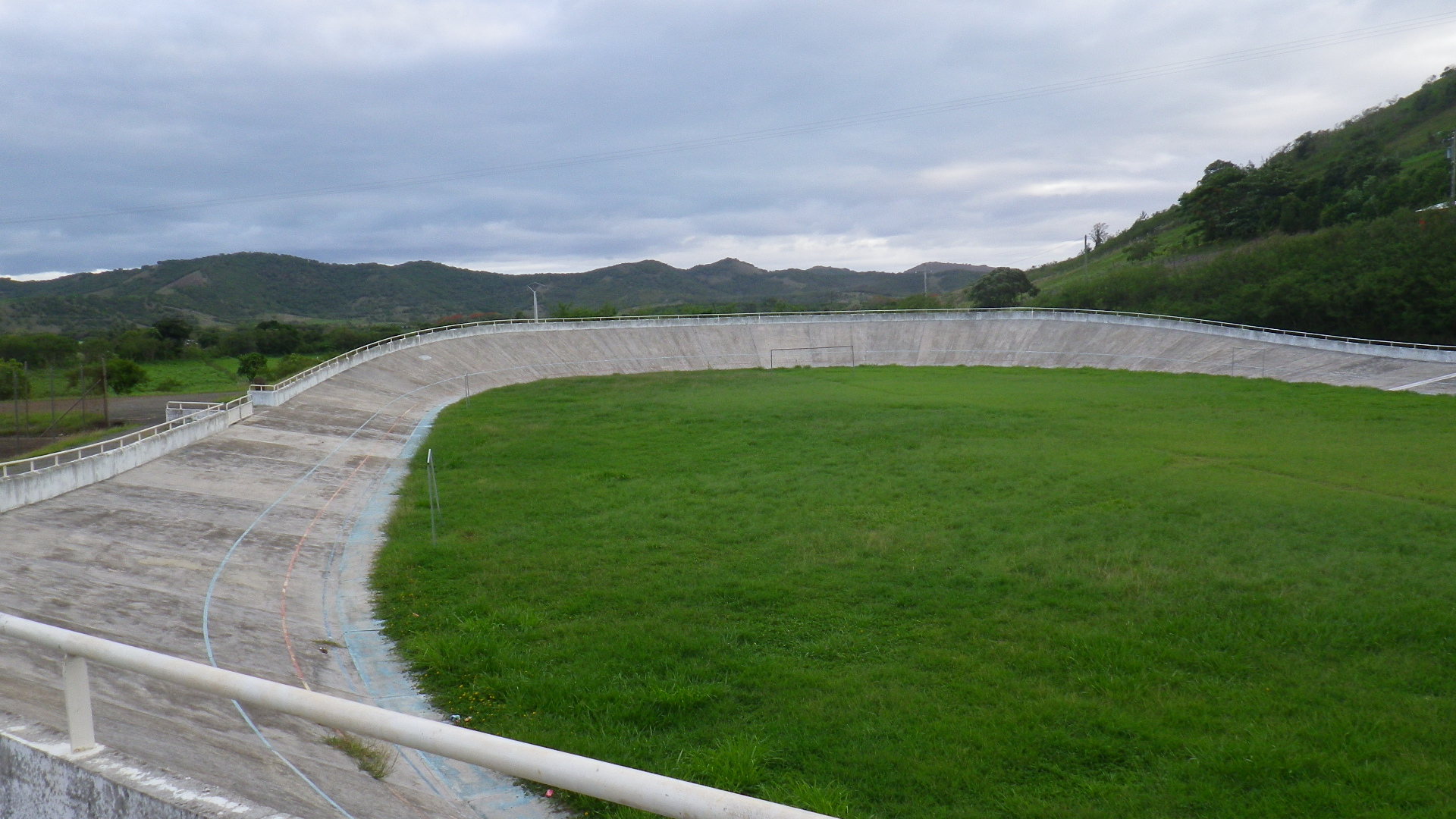
Velodrome of Nessadiou.

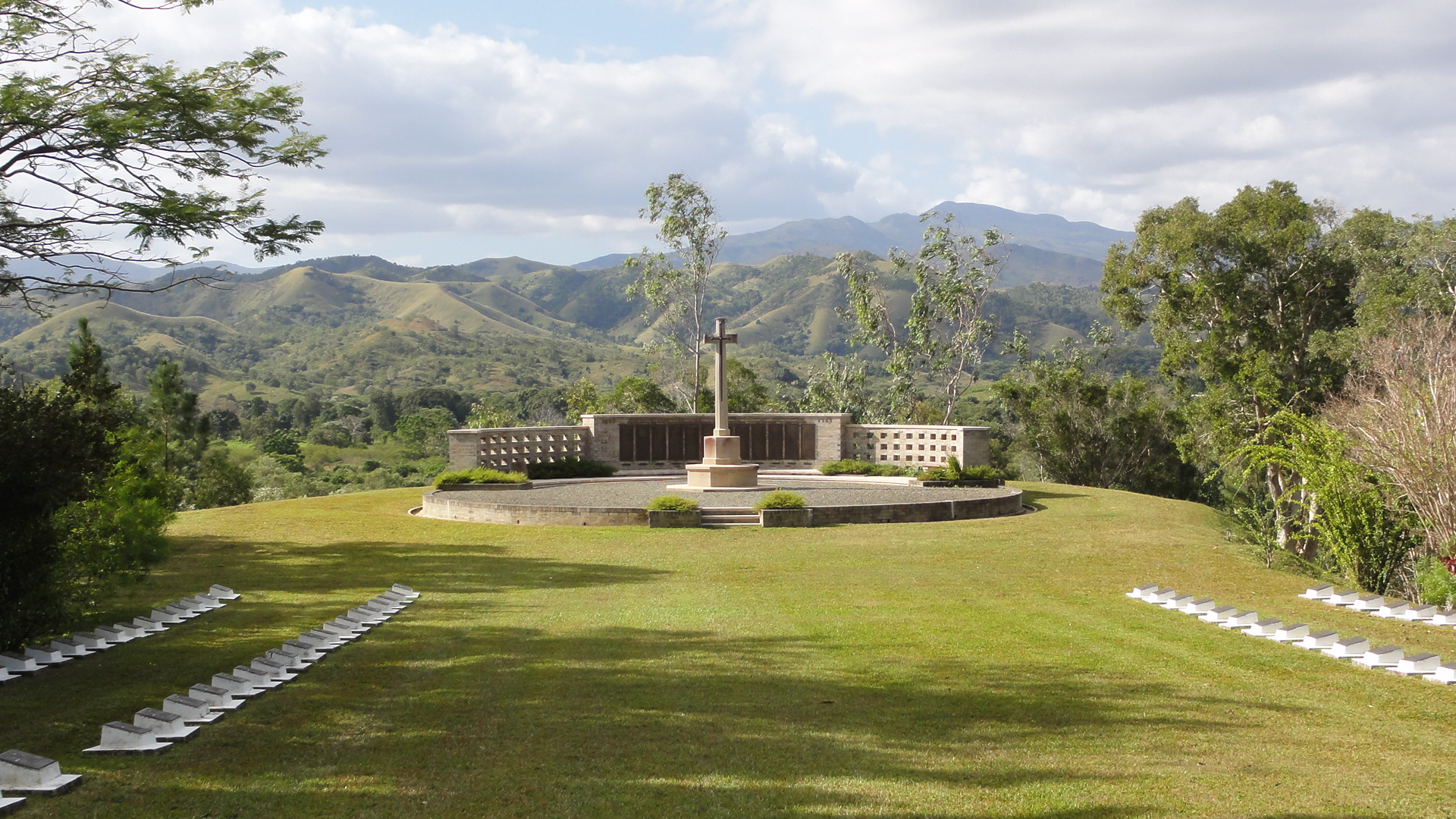
Bourail New Zealand War Cemetery.

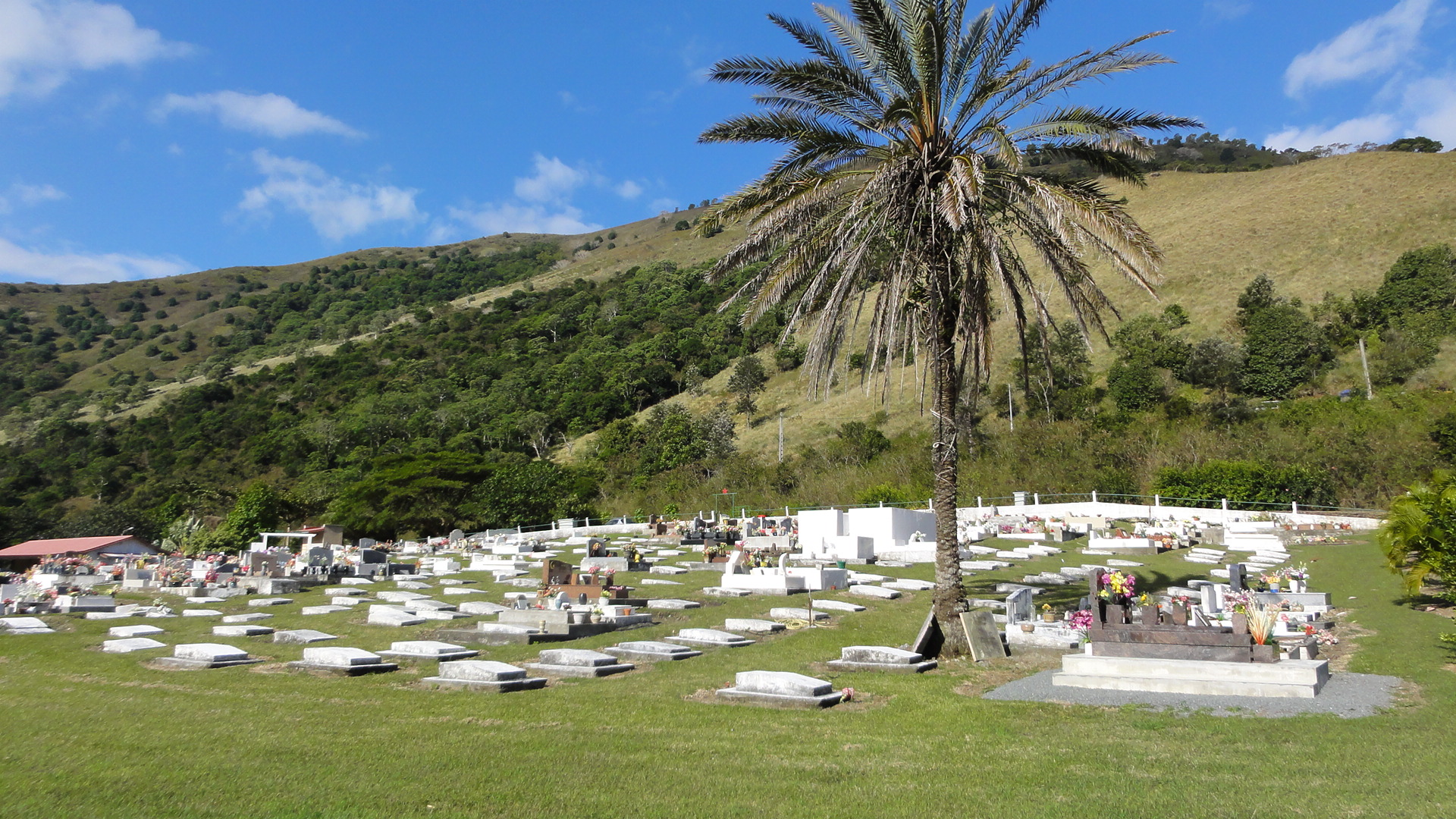
Nessadiou Arab Cemetery.

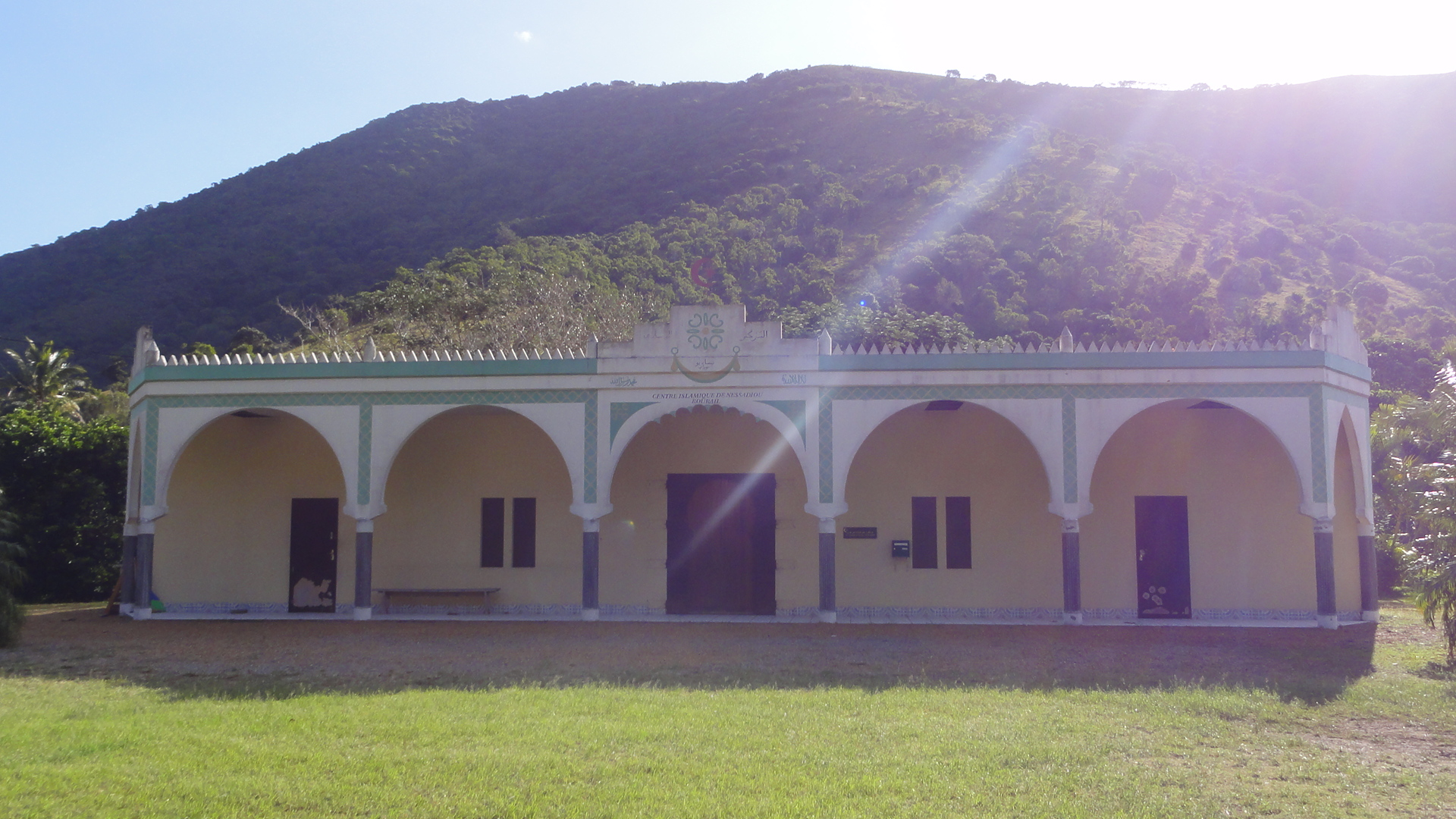
Nessadiou Islamic Cultural Center.

== See also ==
- Algerians of the Pacific
- Islam in New Caledonia
