= Loire (disambiguation) =

The Loire is a river in east-central France.

Loire may also refer to:

== Places ==
- Loiré, a commune in western France
- Six French departments get their name from the river:
  - Loire (department)
  - Indre-et-Loire
  - Haute-Loire
  - Loire-Atlantique
  - Maine-et-Loire
  - Saône-et-Loire

== Other uses ==
- Loire Mk, a French army tank
- Loire Aviation, a French aircraft manufacturer of the 1920s–1930s
- French ship Loire, various ships of the French navy
- Loire (musician), an American vocalist

== See also ==
- Loir (disambiguation)
