= Owen Mead =

New Zealand Army general (1892–1942)

Owen Herbert Mead
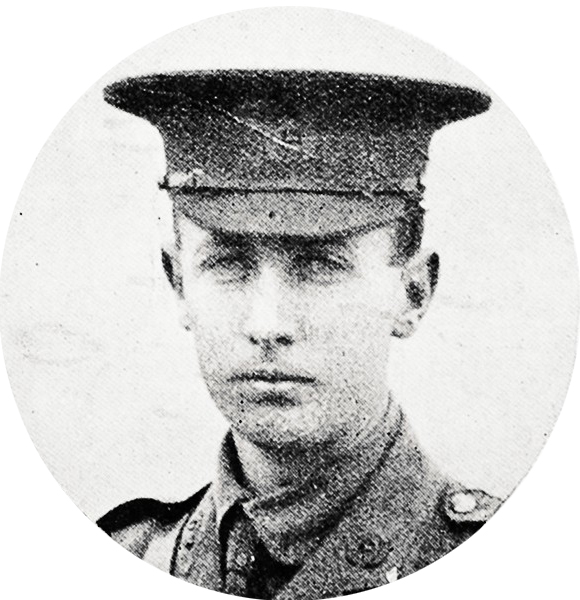
- Mead during the First World War
- Born: 24 January 1892
- Died: 25 July 1942 (aged 50)
- Military career
- Allegiance: New Zealand
- Branch: New Zealand Military Forces
- Service years: 1914–1942
- Rank: Major General
- Commands: Pacific Section, 2NZEF; 1st Battalion, Canterbury Regiment
- Conflicts: First World War; Gallipoli campaign; Western Front; Second World War; Home Front; Defence of Fiji
- Awards: Commander of the Order of the British Empire; Distinguished Service Order; Mentioned in Despatches (2)

Major General Owen Herbert Mead, CBE, DSO (24 January 1892 – 25 July 1942) was an officer in the New Zealand Military Forces who served during the First and Second World Wars.

Mead joined the New Zealand Expeditionary Force (NZEF) following the outbreak of the First World War. He participated in the Gallipoli campaign and served on the Western Front. After the war he joined the New Zealand Staff Corps and held a number of staff positions in the military. During the Second World War he commanded the Pacific Section of the Second New Zealand Expeditionary Force, which was responsible for the defence of Fiji. He went missing, presumed killed, on 25 July 1942, when the aircraft he was a passenger on was lost at sea while en route to Tonga. He was the highest ranked New Zealand soldier killed on active service during the war.

== Early life ==
Owen Mead was born in Dunedin, New Zealand on 24 January 1892. After completing his education at Marlborough High School, he was employed by a banking institution. He also joined the Territorial Force and by 1914 was in charge of senior cadets. Upon the outbreak of the First World War, Mead volunteered for the New Zealand Expeditionary Force (NZEF) which was being raised for service overseas.

== Military career ==
=== First World War ===
Commissioned as a lieutenant, Mead was assigned to the 2nd Company of the Canterbury Battalion and served in the Gallipoli Campaign as the battalion's provost marshal. He was lightly wounded soon after the landings at Anzac Cove on 25 April 1915 but was only out the lines briefly for medical attention before returning to the front. He later fought in actions at Cape Helles but became unwell with dysentery and was evacuated to England.

When the New Zealand Division was formed in Egypt in early 1916, Mead, now recovered, was a company commander, and went to France with the division for service on the Western Front. He participated in the Battle of Flers-Courcelette in September 1916, during which he was wounded, and was mentioned in despatches for his leadership of his company during the Battle of Flers-Courcelette in September 1916.

In England for recovery from his wounds, Mead was involved in the raising of the 4th Infantry Brigade. Promoted to the rank of major in March 1917, he went with the 4th Brigade to France, having been posted to its 3rd Battalion. He participated in the Battle of Messines and afterwards was made second-in-command of his battalion. In September 1917, he was made a temporary lieutenant colonel and given command of a battalion in the 2nd Infantry Brigade. The following month his rank was made substantive and he was appointed commander of the 1st Battalion of the 1st Infantry Brigade, which he led during the latter stages of Battle of Passchendaele. For his services during this battle, and the German spring offensive in March 1918, he was appointed to the Distinguished Service Order in the 1919 King's Birthday Honours. He finished the war as commander of the training battalion for the Canterbury Regiment, and was again mentioned in despatches.

=== Interwar period ===
Mead's service with the NZEF ceased in 1920 but he chose to remain in the military, and subsequently joined the New Zealand Staff Corps. Initially a captain, he received a promotion to major in 1925. He attended the Staff College in Camberley, England, from 1927 to 1928. After completing his courses, he served briefly in the War Office in London. In 1930, he returned to New Zealand, where he held a number of staff positions, which included the area officer for Palmerston North and the brigade major of the 3rd Infantry Brigade, a Territorial Force formation. In 1936, he was promoted to colonel and appointed adjutant general of the New Zealand Military Forces for a two-year term.

=== Second World War ===
Mead was a brigadier and in command of the Northern Military District at the start of the Second World War in September 1939. Not selected for a brigade command in the Second New Zealand Expeditionary Force (2NZEF), he was instead reappointed for a second term as adjutant general. He was appointed a Commander of the Order of the British Empire in the 1940 King's Birthday Honours. From October 1940, he commanded the Southern Military District.

In March 1942, Mead was promoted to major general and made commander of the Pacific Section, 2NZEF, replacing its former commander, Major General William Cunningham. Mead's new command consisted of two brigades, the 8th and 14th Infantry Brigades, which at the time were responsible for the defence of Fiji. His new role also entailed his appointment to the Executive Council of the Colony of Fiji.

In July 1942, the American 37th Division relieved the New Zealand forces in Fiji and assumed responsibility for the defence of the island. The bulk of the two New Zealand brigades began returning to New Zealand that same month. Mead stayed in Fiji to observe the American preparations for the Guadalcanal landings before leaving on 25 July in a Royal New Zealand Air Force Hudson aircraft for a final inspection trip to Tonga. The Hudson went missing en route. Despite extensive searches, no wreckage or trace of any survivors were found and it was presumed to have been lost at sea. Mead's date of death is recorded as 25 July 1942 and he is memorialised on the Bourail Memorial at the Bourail New Zealand War Cemetery at Bourail in New Caledonia. He was the highest-ranking officer of the New Zealand Military Forces to be killed on active service.
