= Algerians of the Pacific =

Algerians deported after the 1871–1872 Mokrani Revolt

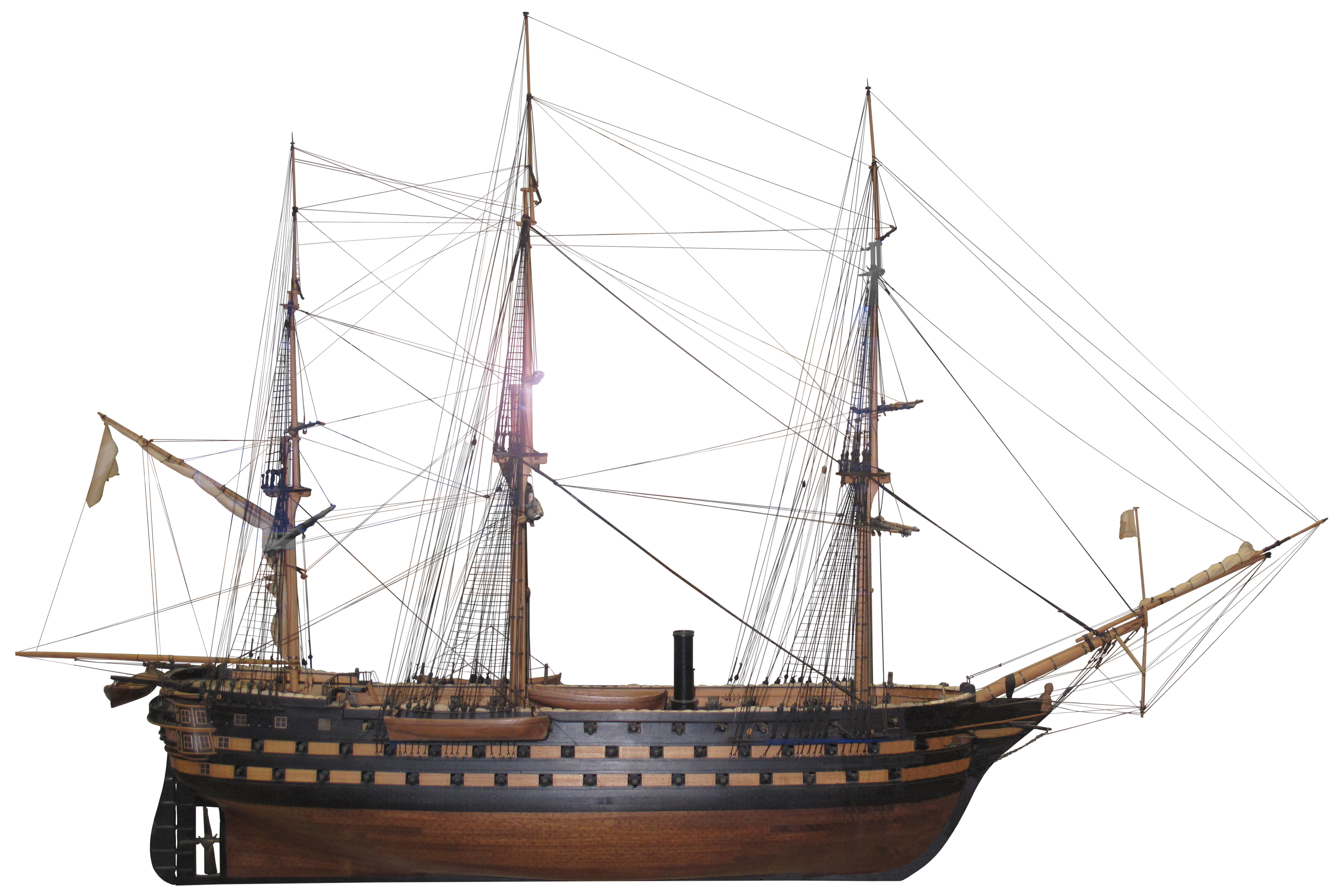
1/75th-scale model of Prince Jérôme alias La Loire, on display at the Swiss Museum of Transport.

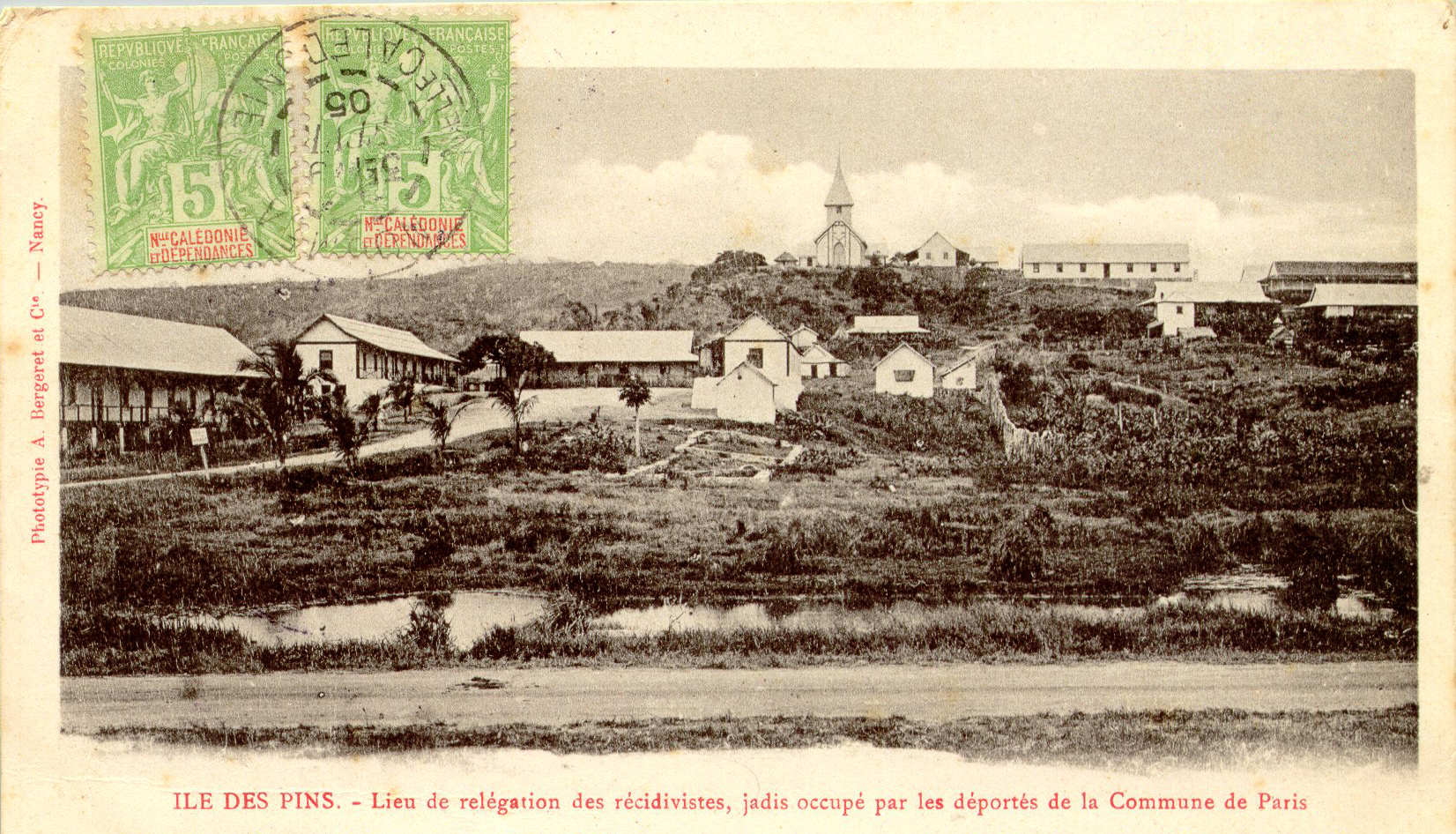
Prison on the L'Île-des-Pins

The Algerians of the Pacific (French: Algériens de Nouvelle-Calédonie) were a group of Algerian men deported by French authorities to labour camps on the island of New Caledonia, after taking part in the 1871–1872 Mokrani Revolt against colonial rule in Algeria.

Their arrest took place in 1871, and 212 persons were tried together in 1873, in the city of Constantine. Most were sent over to prisons in metropolitan France – Oléron and Saint-Martin-de-Ré (on Île de Ré) – then, as these were due to be closed, to Quélern (near Brest). At the same time, 29 of them were kept in Oran; Antoine Chanzy, the Governor-General, attempted to have them removed from the public's eye by proposing they should be sent to the Marquesas Islands. They too were ultimately transported to Quélern, through Marseille. A third group was imprisoned together with former Communards in Thouars.

Due to malfunctions in the communication between ministries, the distinction between sentences to transportation (traditionally, to French Guiana) and deportation (to New Caledonia) was no longer made – all were sent to New Caledonia in the end.

Their arrival on the island coincided with transports of Communards, who were to leave precious testimonies of the Kabyles' presence. However, the Kabyles were left behind when the Communards were granted amnesty in 1879, and remained in exile despite campaigns to raise sympathy among the French public. An amnesty was awarded only in 1895, and they were not able to return to Algeria until after 1904.

Some descendants of the deported still live in New Caledonia. One of them, Taïeb Aïfa, served as the mayor of Bourail from 1977 to 2001. In Nessadiou, south of Bourail, there is a Cimetière des Arabes, or "Cemetery of the Arabs"; over time, the community began to identify as "Arabs" rather than with a Kabyle or local designation. One elderly Algerian-Caledonian traces this to an occasion when the Algerians arrived to perform labour during Ramadan dressed in white robes, whereupon the native Caledonians decided that they must be "Arabs".

== Notable deportees ==
- Cheikh Boumerdassi

== See also ==
- French ship Loire (1827)
- Kabyle diaspora
