= Antoni Berezowski =

Polish nationalist

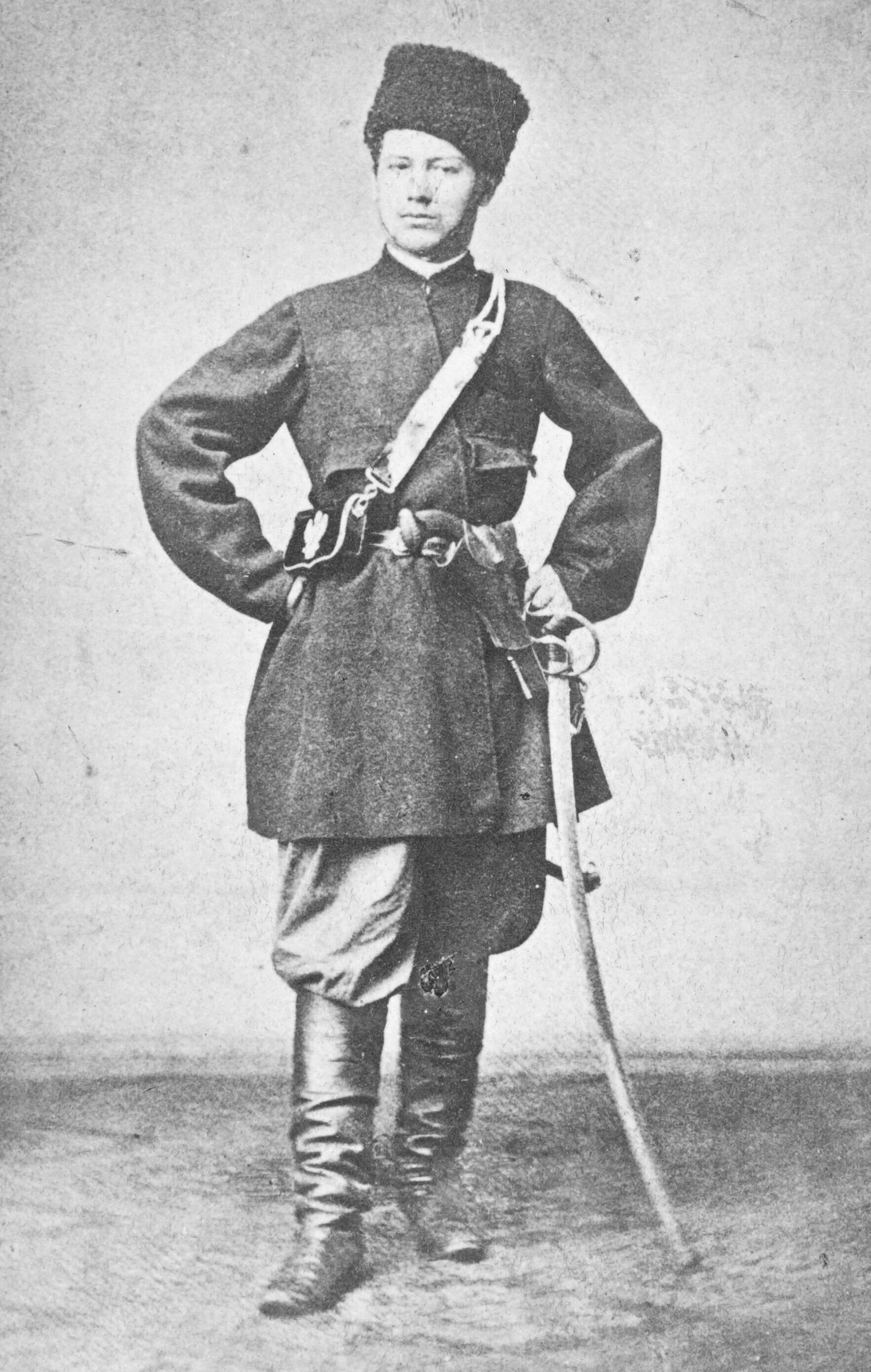
- Born: 9 May 1847; Avratin, Volhynian Governorate, Russian Empire
- Died: 1916 (aged 69-70 years); Bourail, New Caledonia
- Known for: Attempted 1867 regicide of Alexander II of Russia

Antoni Berezowski (May 9, 1847 in Avratin, Volhynian Governorate, Russian Empire – 1916 in Bourail, New Caledonia) was a Polish patriot who made an unsuccessful attempt to assassinate the Russian emperor Alexander II.

== Biography ==
Anton Berezowski (Russian: Антон Иосифович Березовский) was the son of an impoverished Polish nobleman from the Volyn region of north west Ukraine. His parents taught music. As a 16 year old, in 1863, he took part in the Polish revolt against Russian rule. He emigrated to Paris in 1865 where he worked in a metalwork workshop.

In 1867 when Tsar Alexander II arrived to Paris for the World's fair, Berezowski conceived the idea to kill him to liberate his native land. On June 6 at 5:00 p.m. at Longchamp Racecourse (in Bois de Boulogne) he shot at the tsar who had just come back from a military review (together with the tsar there were two of his sons and Napoleon III, Emperor of the French). His double-barrelled pistol broke off at the shot, and the bullet, having deviated, wounded a horse of an accompanying Russian. Berezovsky, whose hand was wounded by the explosion, was seized by the crowd and arrested. In court on July 15 Berezovsky declared that his purpose in shooting at the tsar was to release his native land; he only expressed one regret, that it occurred in Poland-friendly France. Berezovsky avoided the death penalty and was sentenced to lifelong hard labor in New Caledonia on the island of Grand Terre. In 1886 hard labor was commuted to life. In 1906 he was pardoned, but did not wish to come back from New Caledonia, remaining there until his death in 1916.
