= French ship Loire =

Seventeen ships of the French Navy have borne the name Loire, after the longest river in France:

- Loire (1668), a 6-gun flute
- Loire (1686), a 30-gun flute
- Loire (1720), a flute
- Loire (1780), a scow
- Loire (1796), a 44-gun frigate
- Loire (1803), a 20-gun flute, lead ship of her two-vessel her class; destroyed with her classmate in 1809 to avoid capture by the Royal Navy
- Loire (1809), a scow
- Loire (1814), a flute broken up in 1838
- Loire (1827), a three-masted propeller-sail mixed transport vessel with a wooden hull.
- Loire (1840), a scow
- Loire (1855), a Dordogne-class troopship
- Prince Jérôme (1854), a Hercule-class ship of the line, was converted into a transport in 1872 as Loire
- Loire (1915), a commandeered four-masted barque
- Loire (1915), a requisitioned steam ship
- Loire (1916), a requisitioned cargo ship
- Loire, an oiler
- Loire (A615), (1965–2009) a mine countermeasures support ship
- Loire (A602), (2018-present) lead ship of her class of four offshore support and assistance vessels deployed in Metropolitan France
Ships named Loire
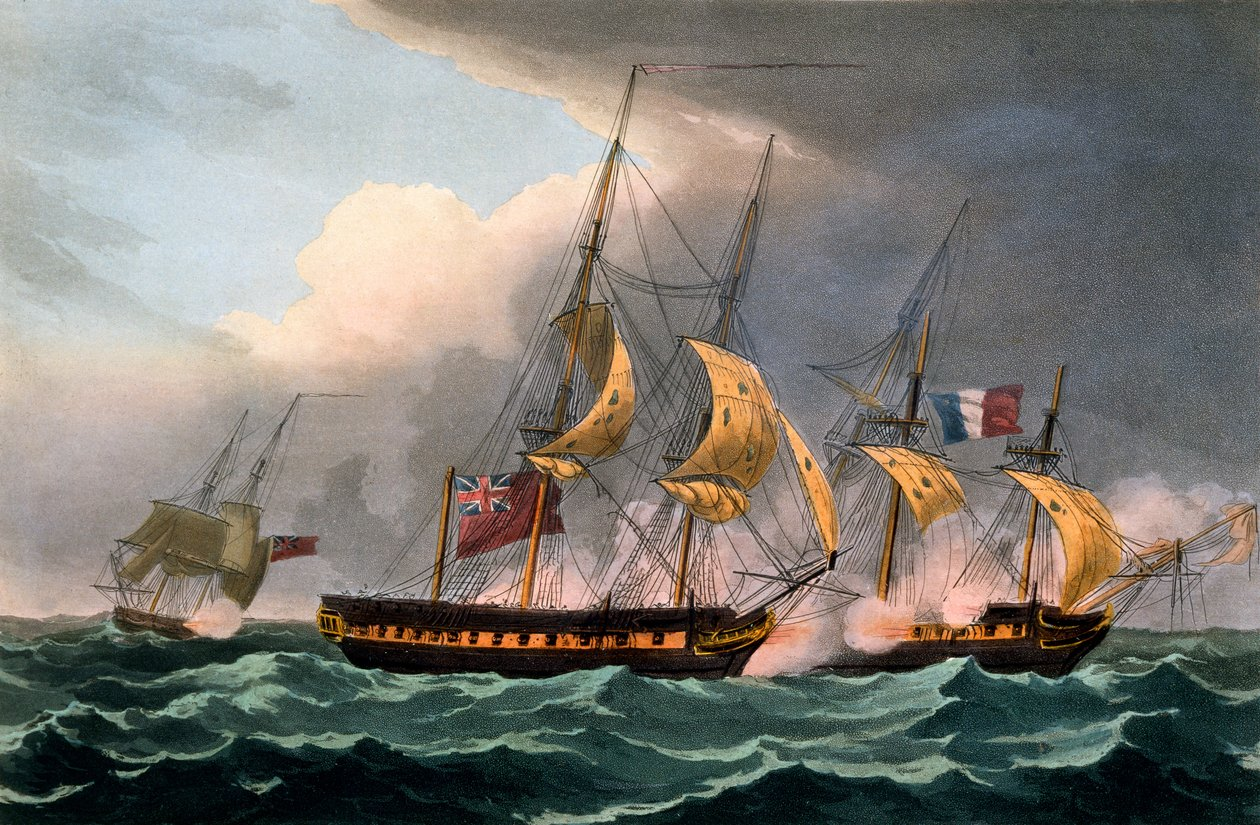
Loire (1796) battling HMS Kangaroo and Anson.

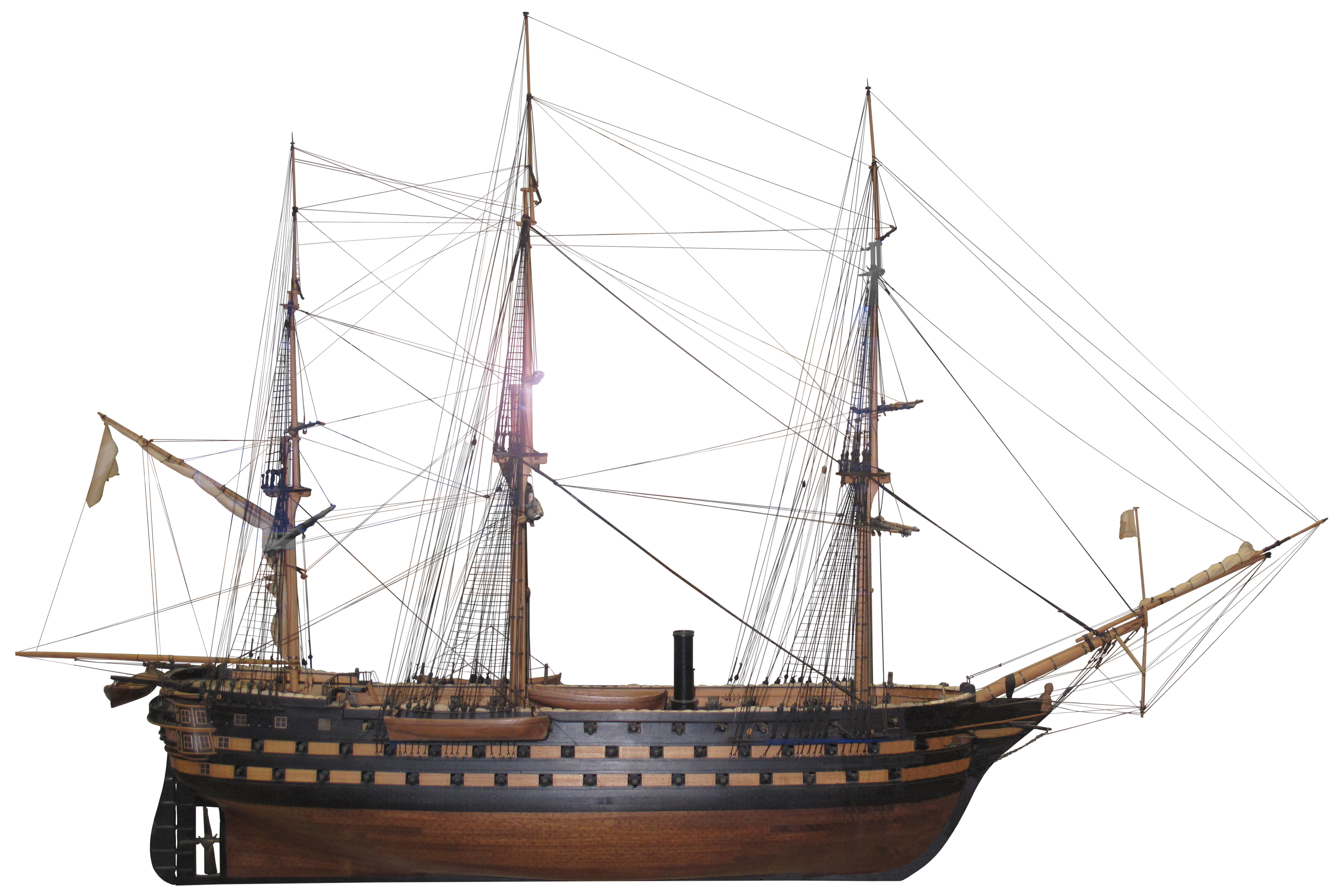
Prince Jérôme (1854)

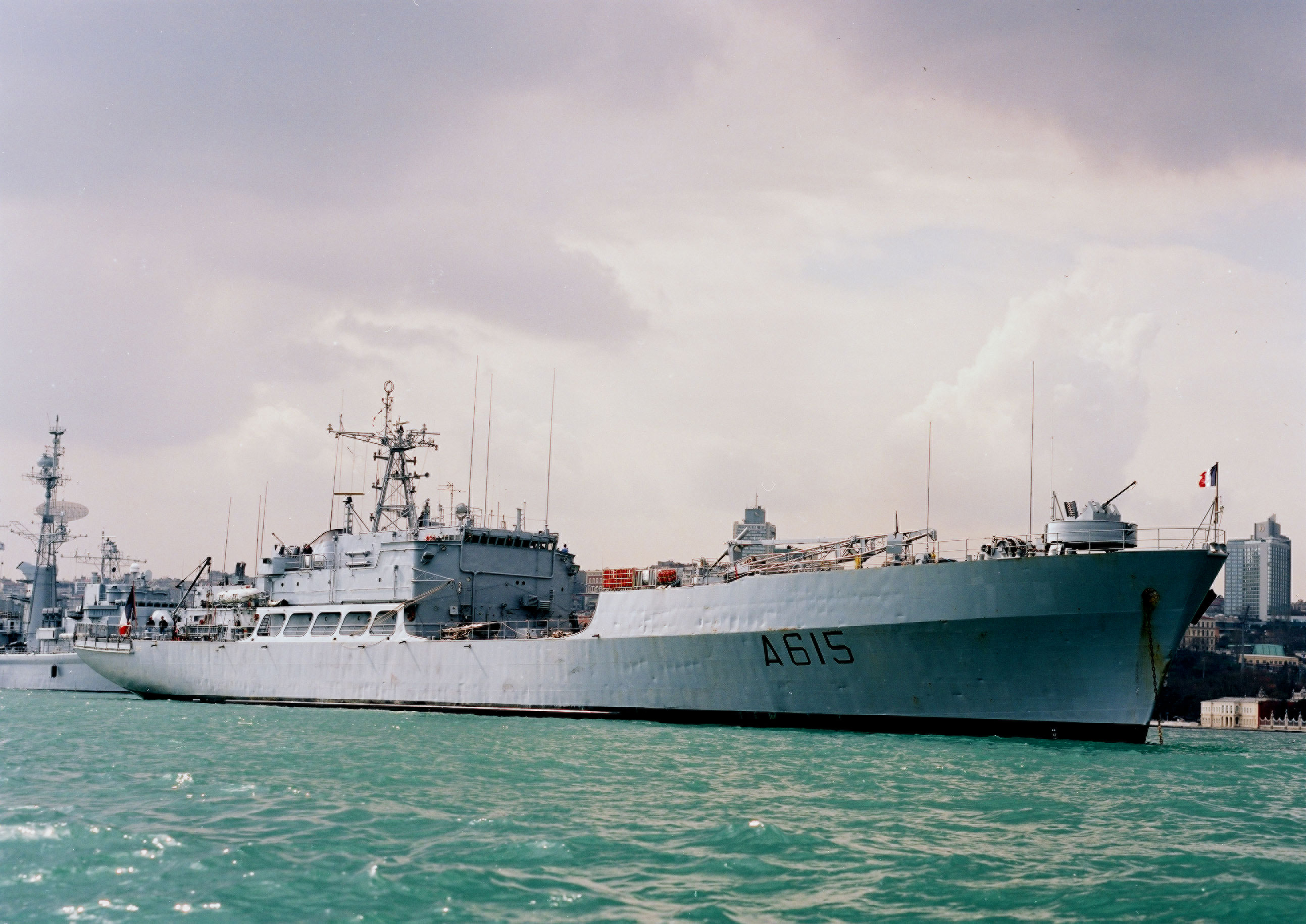
Loire (A615)

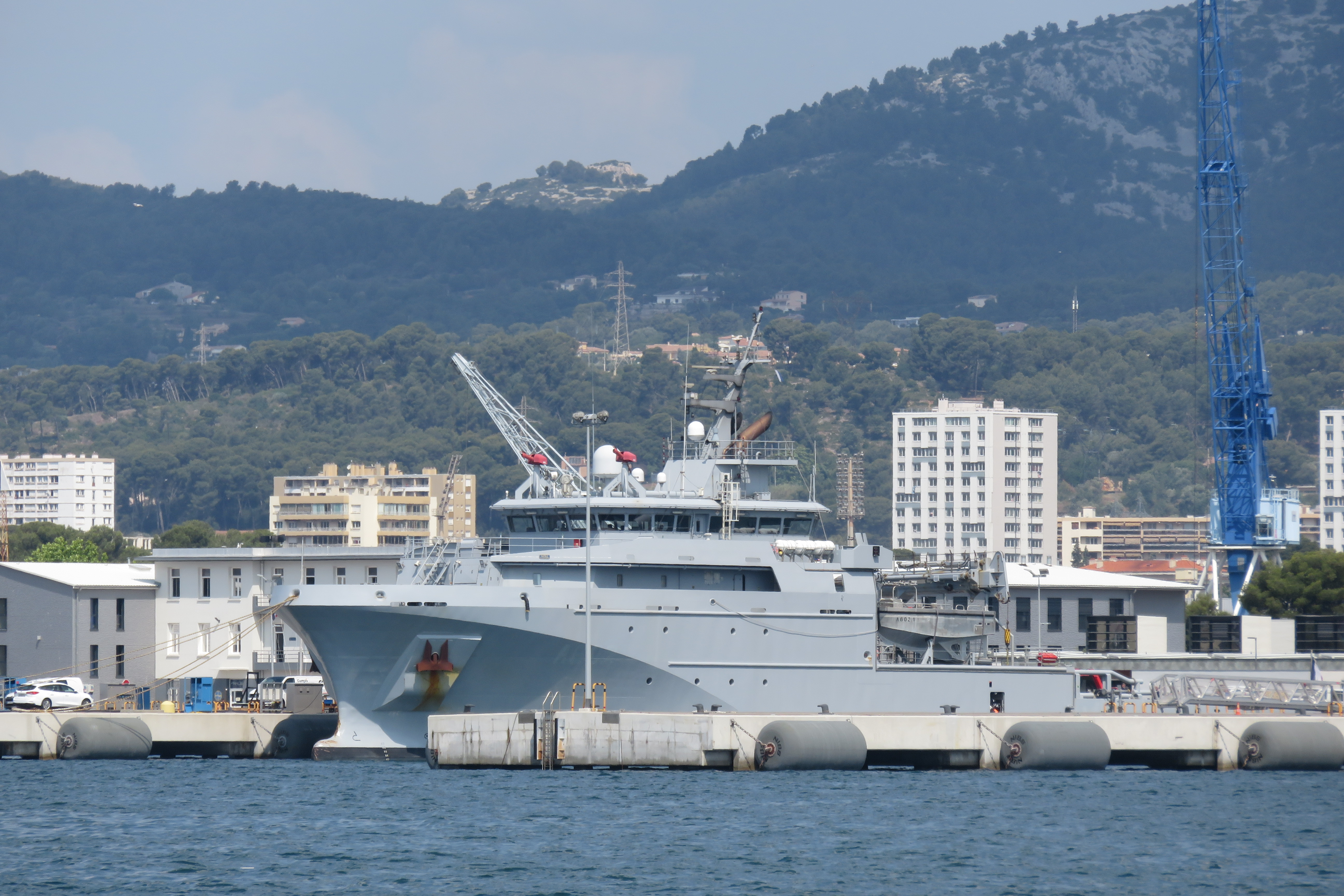
Loire (A602)
