= Bourail New Zealand War Cemetery =

WWII CWGC cemetery in New Caledonia

- Commonwealth War Graves Commission
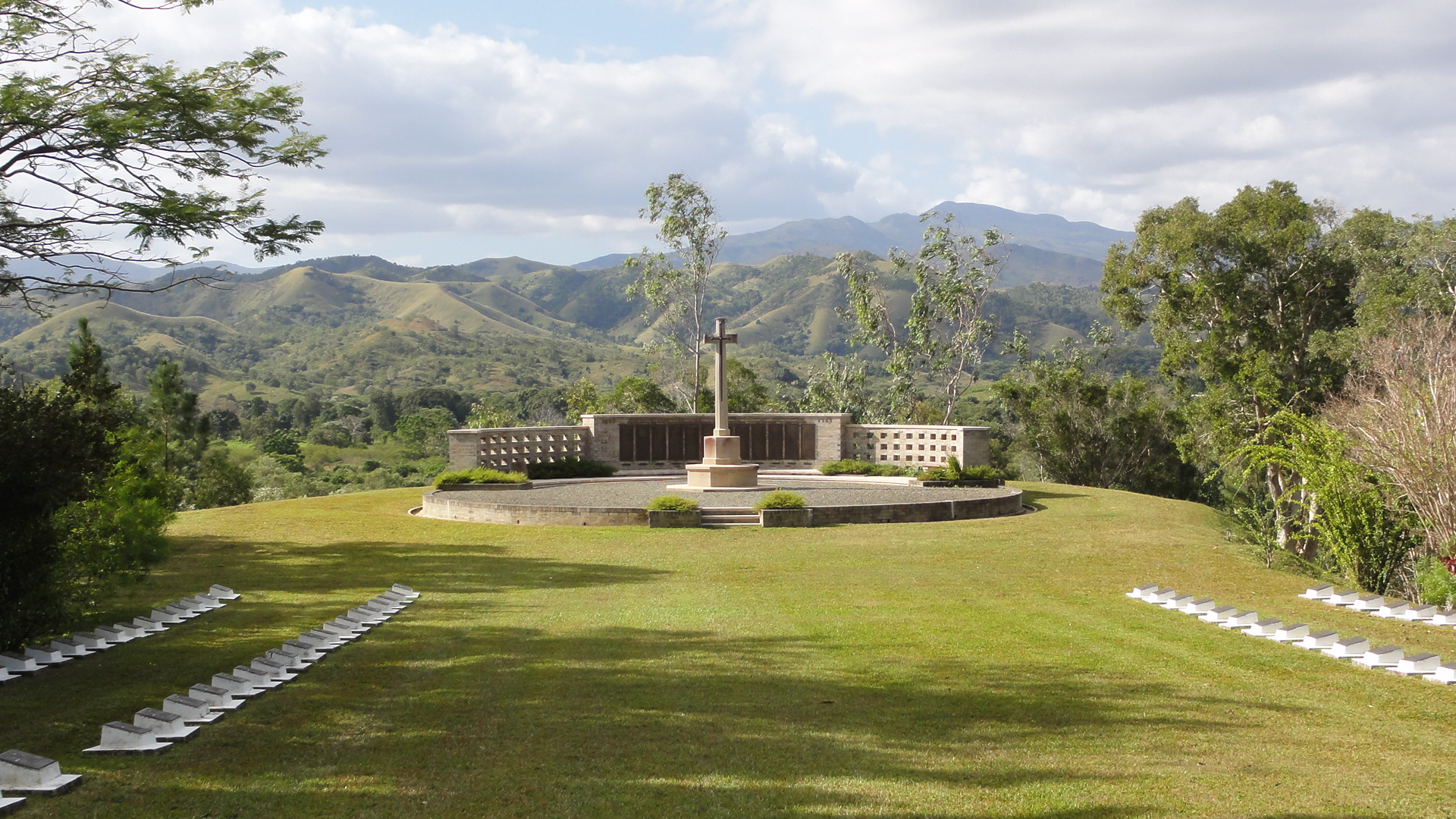
- A view of the Cross of Sacrifice at the Bourail New Zealand War Cemetery, with the Bourail Memorial at the rear
- Used for those deceased 1943–1945
- Established: 1943
- Location: 21°37′12.212″S 165°32′51.698″E near Bourail, New Caledonia
- Designed by: C.P. Vize

Burials by nation
- Allied Powers: New Zealand: 235; United Kingdom: 7

Burials by war
- Second World War: 242

Bourail New Zealand War Cemetery is a Commonwealth War Graves Commission burial ground for the dead of the Second World War located near the town of Bourail, in New Caledonia. It is also the location of the Bourail Memorial, commemorating New Zealand and Western Pacific Local Forces military personnel killed in the South Pacific and who have no known grave.

== History ==
During the Second World War, New Caledonia was a major base for the Allied forces in the South Pacific. The island, which had been under French control since 1854, was used to train personnel prior to being them being transferred to combat areas. New Zealand's presence on New Caledonia commenced in late 1942, when the headquarters of the 3rd New Zealand Division, designated for operations in the Solomon Islands campaign, was established at the town of Bourail. The cemetery that became the Bourail New Zealand War Cemetery was established in 1943 to receive the bodies of New Zealand personnel who died while on active service on the island. By September 1944, after the disbandment of the 3rd New Zealand Division and repatriation of its personnel back to New Zealand, around 40 to 50 personnel were buried there.

After the war, the remains of some 200 New Zealand casualties killed on other islands in the South Pacific including Guadalcanal, Vella Lavella and Bougainville among others, were relocated to the cemetery. The Bourail New Zealand War Cemetery was officially dedicated in October 1945.

== Cemetery ==
Located 9 kilometres (5.6 mi) from Bourail, on the main road running south from the town, the cemetery was designed by C.P. Vize. The entrance is on the southwest side of the cemetery, and has a dogleg configuration, extending initially to the northwest before being pivoting north. The interments are arranged either side of an avenue extending to a Cross of Sacrifice at the northern end of the cemetery. The Cross of Sacrifice was unveiled by Major General Harold Barrowclough, the former commander of the 3rd New Zealand Division, on 8 May 1955.

The cemetery has 242 interments. Most are New Zealand military personnel but seven are from the United Kingdom.

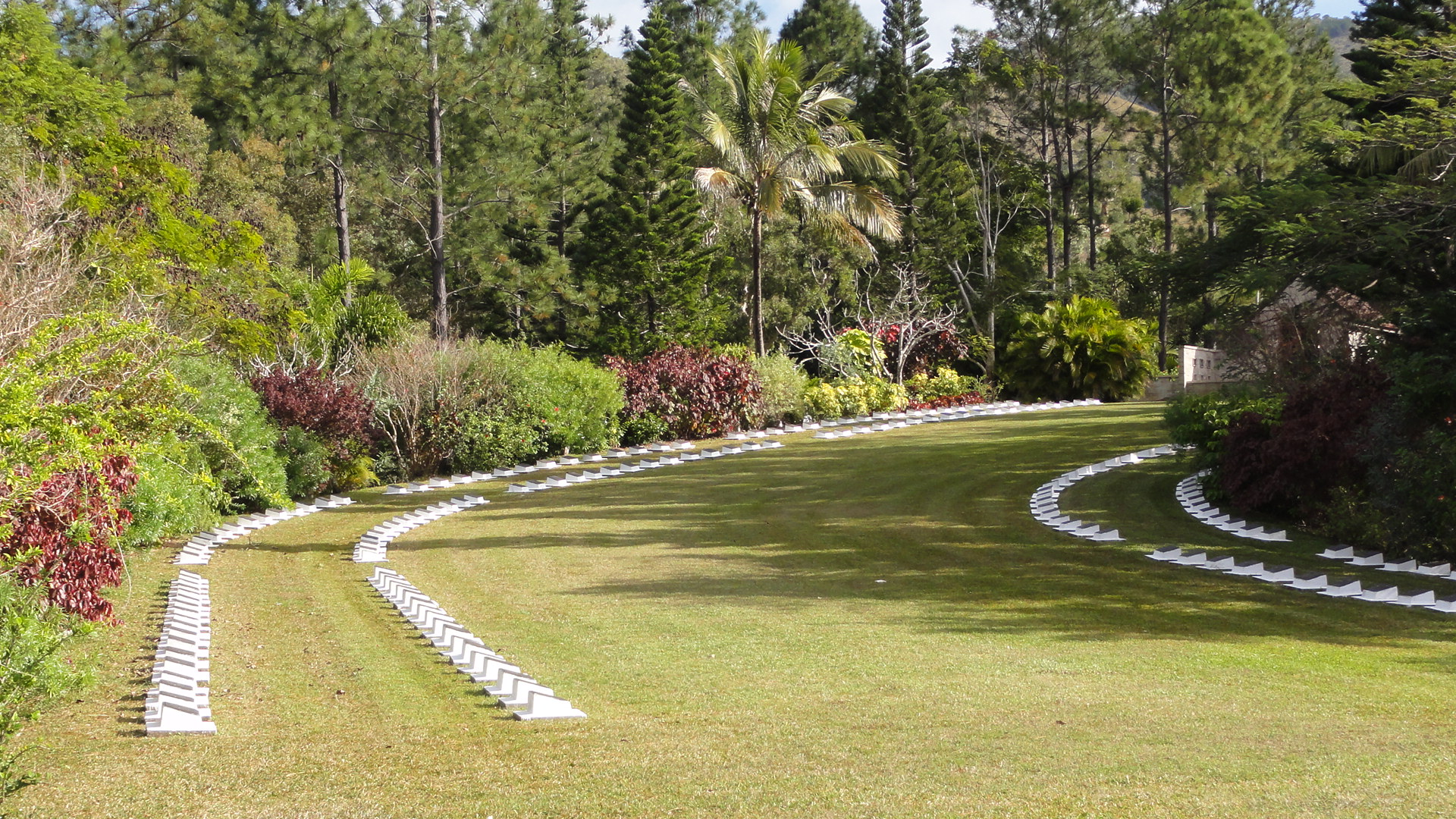
A view of some of the graves at the Bourail New Zealand War Cemetery

=== Bourail Memorial ===
Positioned behind the cemetery's Cross of Sacrifice is the Bourail Memorial. This commemorates New Zealand military personnel and those of the Western Pacific Local Forces killed while on active service in the South Pacific and who have no known grave. The names of the 449 personnel honoured are listed on twelve bronze plaques, nine for the 304 New Zealanders and the remaining three for those of the Western Pacific Local Forces. Among the personnel identified on the Bourail Memorial is Major General Owen Mead, the highest-ranking officer of the New Zealand Military Forces to be killed on active service.
