= Bourail =

Commune of New Caledonia

- Commune
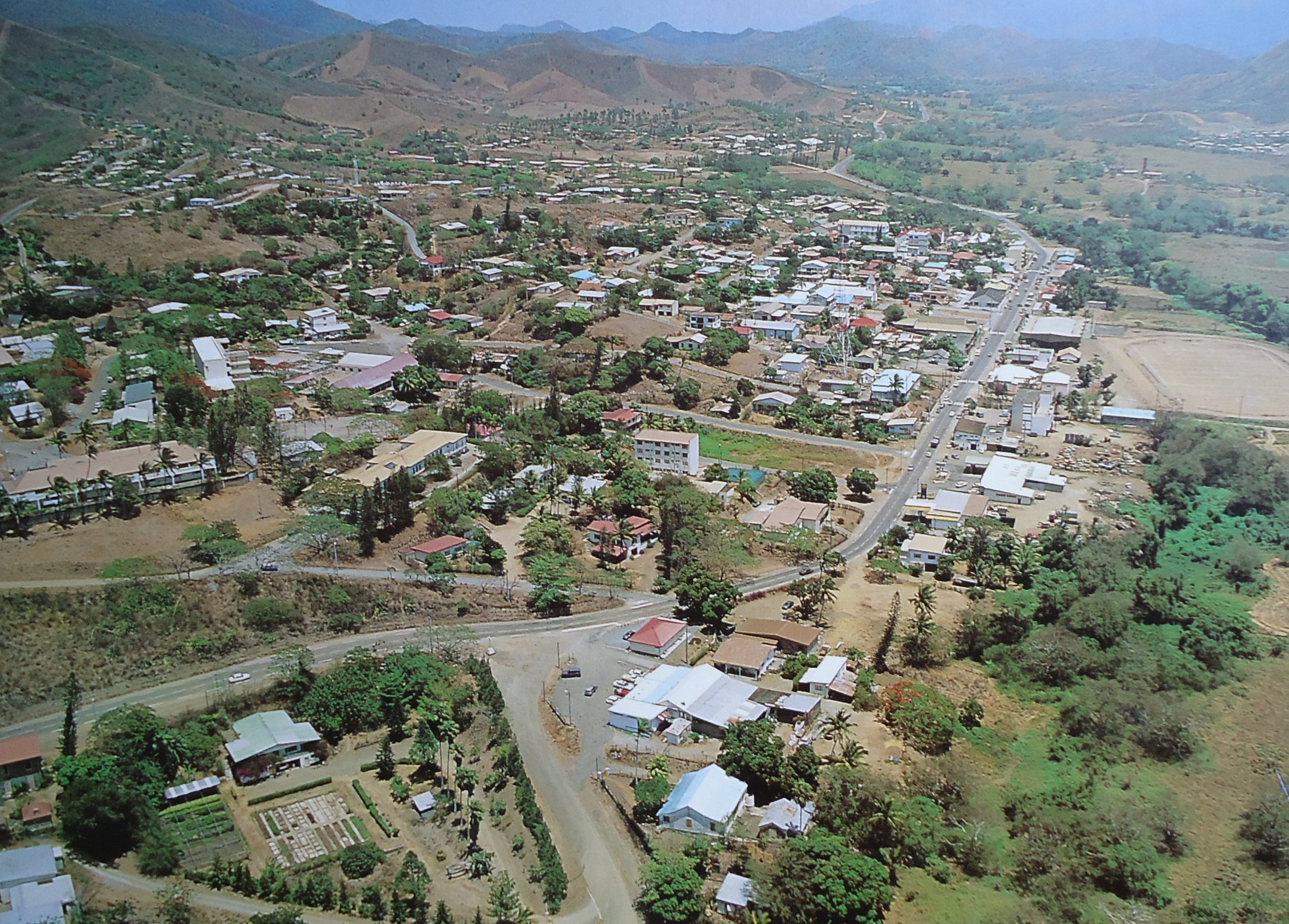
- An aerial view of the centre of Bourail

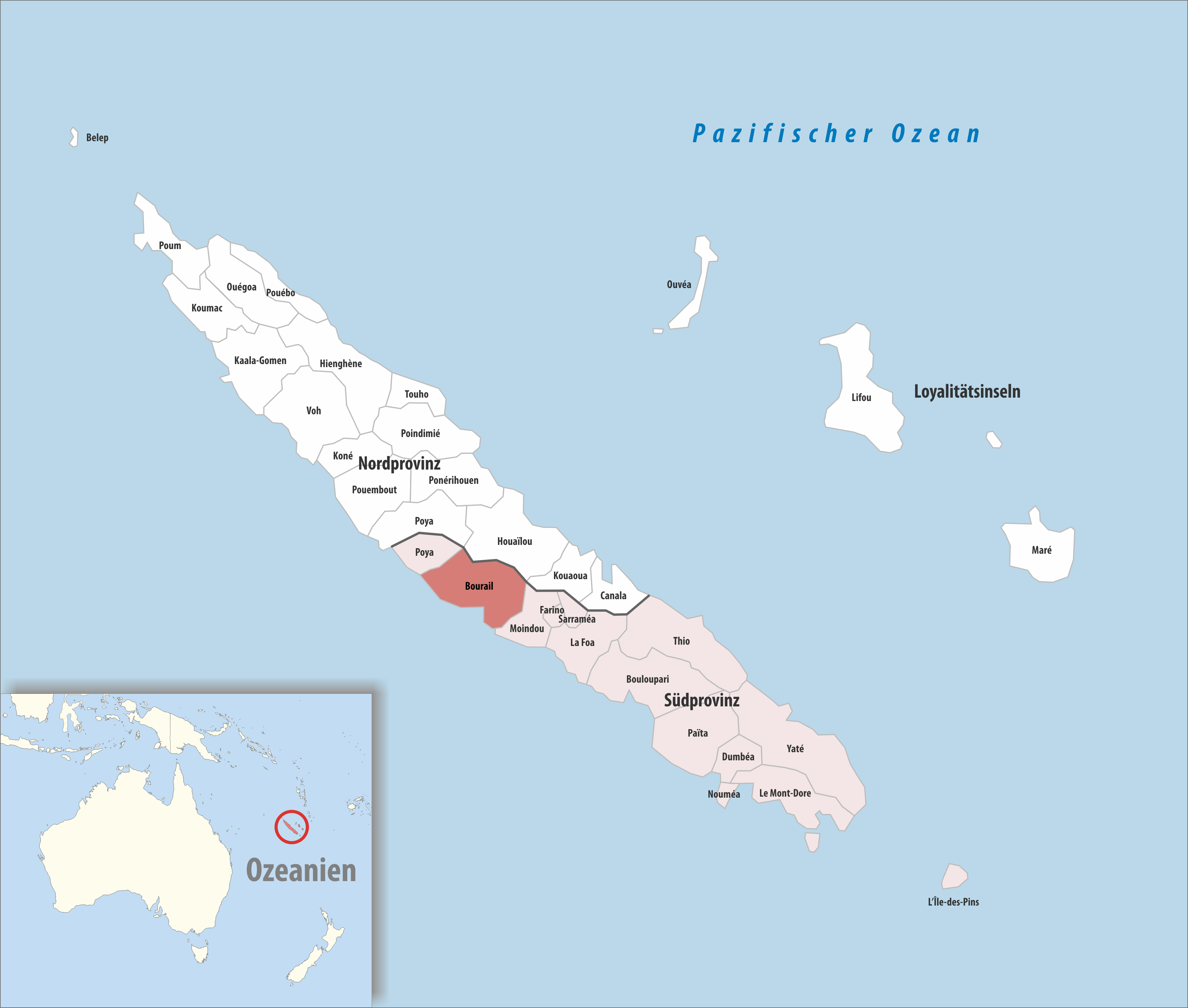
- Location of the commune (in red) within New Caledonia
- Location of Bourail
- Location within France
- Coordinates: 21°34′12″S 165°28′49″E
- Country: France
- Sui generis collectivity: New Caledonia
- Province: South Province

Government
  - Mayor (2020–2026): Patrick Robelin
- Area^{1}: 797.6 km^{2} (308.0 sq mi)
- Elevation: 10 m (33 ft)
- Highest elevation: 1,438 m (4,718 ft)
- Lowest elevation: 0 m (0 ft)
- Population (2019 census): 5,531
  - Density: 6.935/km^{2} (17.96/sq mi)

Ethnic distribution
  - 2019 census: Kanaks 35.4% Europeans 30.68% Wallisians and Futunans 2.21% Mixed 12.31% Other 19.4%
- Time zone: UTC+11:00
- INSEE/Postal code: 98803 /98870
- ^{1} New Caledonia Land Register (DITTT) data, which exclude lakes and ponds larger than 1 km² (0.386 sq mi or 247 acres) as well as the estuaries of rivers.

Bourail (French: [buʁaj], Ajië: Bu Rhaï) is a commune in the South Province of New Caledonia, an overseas territory of France in the Pacific Ocean.

== Geography ==
Bourail is a rural town of Grande Terre, New Caledonia's main island. The municipality stretches between the mountain ranges running the length of New Caledonia down to the sea. Beaches attract tourists but have retained their natural landscapes, and are popular with surfers. The town lies at the confluence of several rivers, is the crossroads of many valleys including Boghen, Bacouya, Nessadiou, Nera, Tene and La Pouéo.

The territory of the municipality has various natural landscapes:

- Mining landscapes
- Landscapes of valleys and alluvial plains making Bourail the capital of rural New Caledonia
- Coastal mangroves
- The coastline also includes surf beaches and calmer beaches protected by the outer coral reef
- seascapes including reefs and passes

With a density of 6 inhabitants / km ², Bourail has a mix rural and town life.

=== Climate ===
Bourail has a tropical savanna climate (Köppen climate classification Aw). The average annual temperature in Bourail is 22.9 °C (73.2 °F). The average annual rainfall is 1,167.6 mm (45.97 in) with March as the wettest month. The temperatures are highest on average in February, at around 26.6 °C (79.9 °F), and lowest in July, at around 19.1 °C (66.4 °F). The highest temperature ever recorded in Bourail was 38.0 °C (100.4 °F) on 17 February 1980; the coldest temperature ever recorded was 2.3 °C (36.1 °F) on 17 June 1965.

Climate data for Bourail (1991−2020 normals, extremes 1962−present)
Month	Jan	Feb	Mar	Apr	May	Jun	Jul	Aug	Sep	Oct	Nov	Dec	Year
Record high °C (°F)	37.9 (100.2)	38.0 (100.4)	36.4 (97.5)	35.8 (96.4)	34.0 (93.2)	33.0 (91.4)	30.9 (87.6)	31.5 (88.7)	34.2 (93.6)	35.3 (95.5)	37.1 (98.8)	36.9 (98.4)	38.0 (100.4)
Mean daily maximum °C (°F)	31.6 (88.9)	31.6 (88.9)	30.7 (87.3)	29.3 (84.7)	27.3 (81.1)	25.8 (78.4)	24.9 (76.8)	25.2 (77.4)	27.0 (80.6)	28.8 (83.8)	30.0 (86.0)	31.1 (88.0)	28.6 (83.5)
Daily mean °C (°F)	26.2 (79.2)	26.6 (79.9)	26.0 (78.8)	24.2 (75.6)	22.0 (71.6)	20.3 (68.5)	19.1 (66.4)	19.2 (66.6)	20.4 (68.7)	22.1 (71.8)	23.7 (74.7)	25.4 (77.7)	22.9 (73.2)
Mean daily minimum °C (°F)	20.8 (69.4)	21.7 (71.1)	21.3 (70.3)	19.2 (66.6)	16.6 (61.9)	14.9 (58.8)	13.3 (55.9)	13.1 (55.6)	13.7 (56.7)	15.5 (59.9)	17.3 (63.1)	19.7 (67.5)	17.3 (63.1)
Record low °C (°F)	12.5 (54.5)	12.4 (54.3)	12.1 (53.8)	9.9 (49.8)	5.2 (41.4)	2.3 (36.1)	3.8 (38.8)	2.5 (36.5)	4.5 (40.1)	4.0 (39.2)	8.2 (46.8)	9.1 (48.4)	2.3 (36.1)
Average precipitation mm (inches)	136.7 (5.38)	185.9 (7.32)	205.0 (8.07)	105.7 (4.16)	75.5 (2.97)	78.8 (3.10)	60.4 (2.38)	63.1 (2.48)	35.0 (1.38)	36.8 (1.45)	63.9 (2.52)	120.8 (4.76)	1,167.6 (45.97)
Average precipitation days (≥ 1.0 mm)	9.9	12.7	12.7	9.1	7.4	7.8	6.8	6.8	4.2	4.1	6.2	9.2	97.0
Source 1: Météo-France
Source 2: Service de la météorologie de la Nouvelle-Calédonie

== Toponymy ==
Bourail means "lizard's tail".

This comes from bu rhaï in the Ajie language, bu meaning "tail" and rhaï "the lizard".

== Coat of arms ==
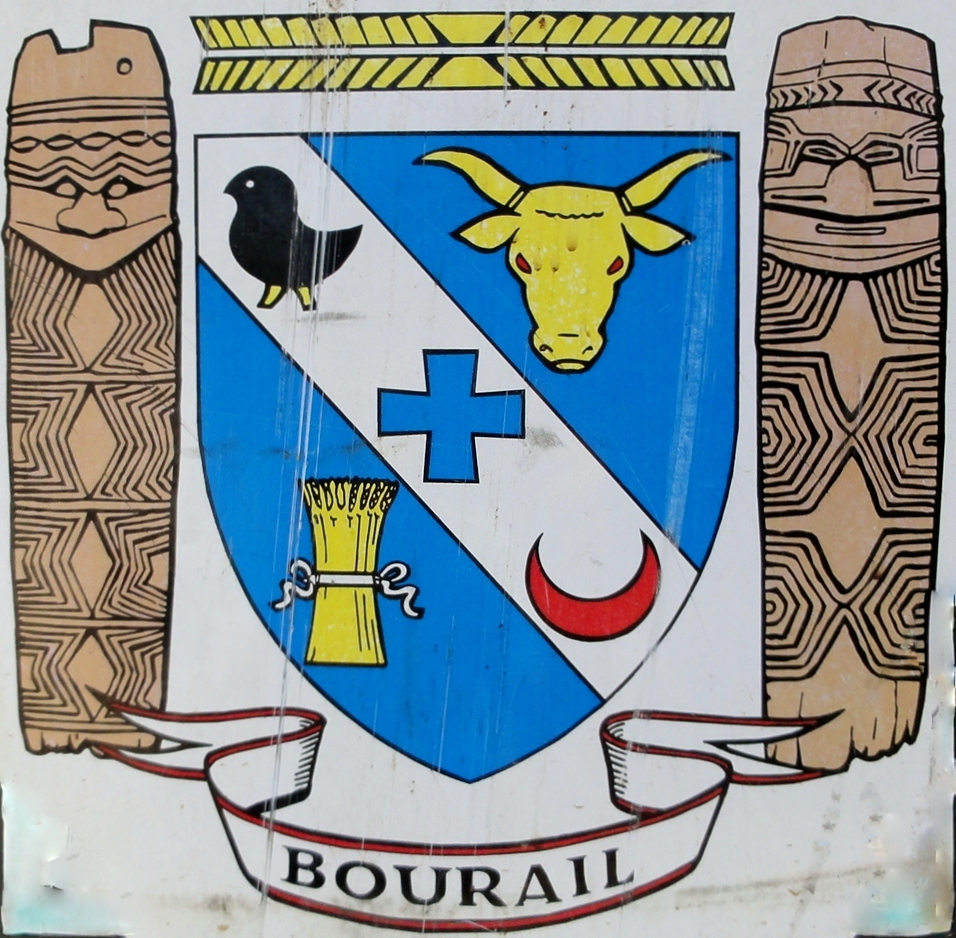
Coat of Arms of Bourail

- The two casings represent the Kanak population
- The crescent moon represents the Muslim population
- Blue Cross is the cemetery of New Zealand
- The Bird is the yellow-legged Thrush Moluccan imported control such invasions of locusts
- head of livestock and the Sheaf of Wheat represents the farming community

== Slogan ==
The slogan of Bourail used for tourism is "Bourail, land of emotions."

== Population and Society ==
=== Demography ===
5,531 inhabitants (2019)

The average age of the population is under 30 years.

Most young people from Bourail continue their studies in Nouméa. To mitigate this requirement, the town has seen several more schools built. There are about 2,000 children attending schools up to high school level, but there is no university.

The inhabitants are called Bouraillais(es), they are nicknamed "Pattes Jaunes", literally "yellow legs" (referring to one of the birds of the region: common Mynas).

=== Schools ===
- College Louis-Léopold Djiet
- Private College Sacré-Coeur
- Private vocational school Père Guéneau (LPPG-mechanical) and François d'Assise (LPFA-sector)
- Saint-Joseph school (private elementary school)
- Lys d'eau school (maternal + CP-CE1)
- Louise-Michel school (primary school)

=== Culture ===
- Church of Bourail
- Museum of Bourail
- Cinema
- Library
- The Colisé (theater)
- Music school

=== Sports grounds ===
- Football stadium
- Sports hall
- Gymnasium
- Tennis courts

=== People related to Bourail ===
The Pole Antoni Berezowski, who in 1867 tried in Paris to assassinate the emperor Alexander II of Russia, lived in exile in Bourail from 1886 until his death in 1916.

== Policy and administration ==
=== Kanak tribes ===
- Pothé tribe
- Azareu tribe
- Bouirou tribe
- Ny tribe
- Boregahou tribe
- Gouaro tribe
- Oua-Oué tribe

=== Districts ===
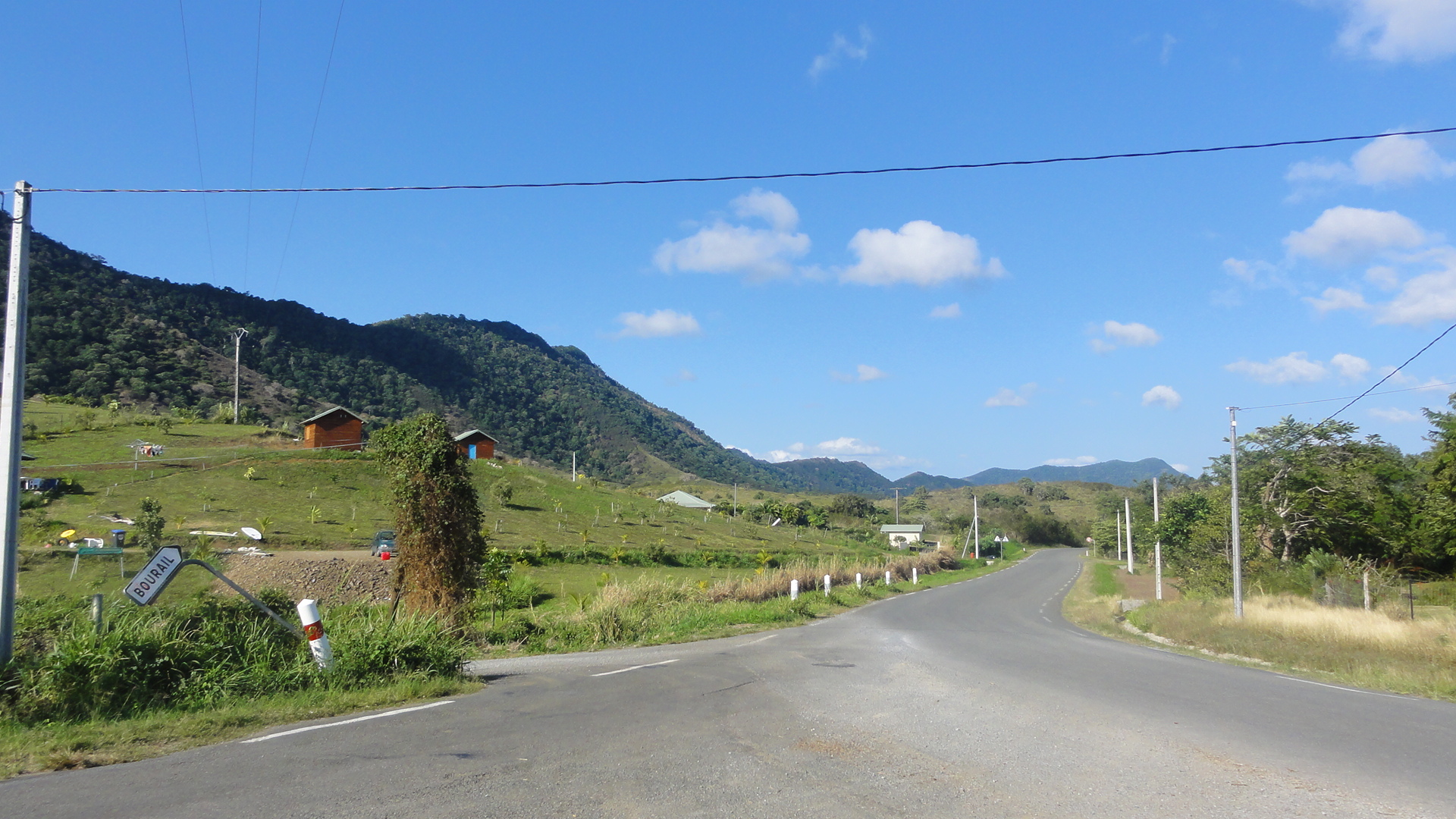
Gouaro district

- Roche Percée
- Poé
- Gouaro
- Téné
- FSH (Bourail)
- Nandai
- Nessadiou
- Boghen

== Sister cities ==
- Waimate, New Zealand

== Economy ==
=== Agriculture ===
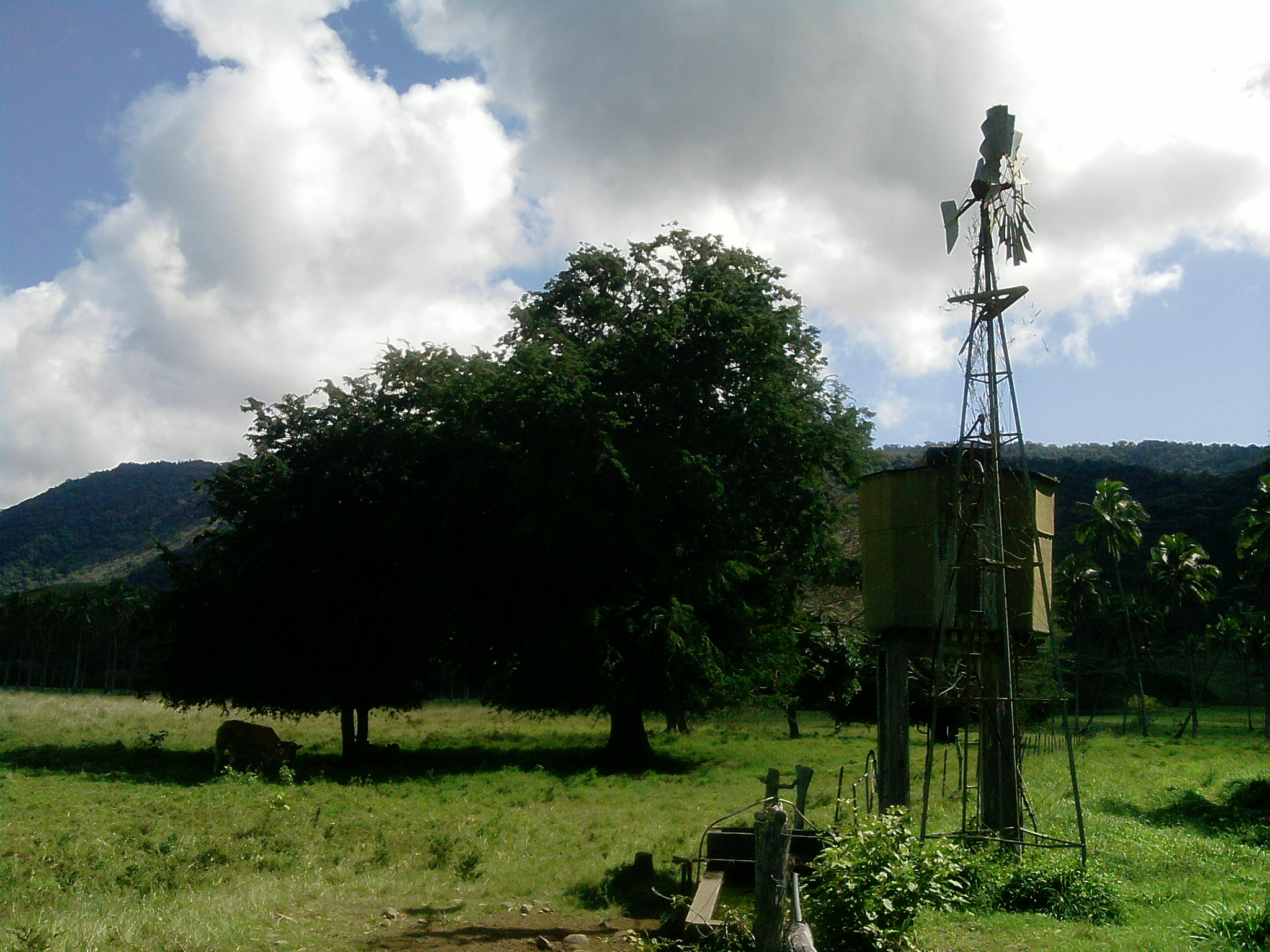
Gabé station

Agriculture has historically been the mainstay of the community. Livestock consists mainly of cattle but also pigs, deer, poultry and beekeeping. Maize and potatoes are the main arable crops, while subsistence farming is also common. The town is often considered the "capital of the Bush" (referring to the rural area of New Caledonia outside of Nouméa and its satellite towns), particularly through the annual Bourail Agricultural Fair.

=== Tourism ===
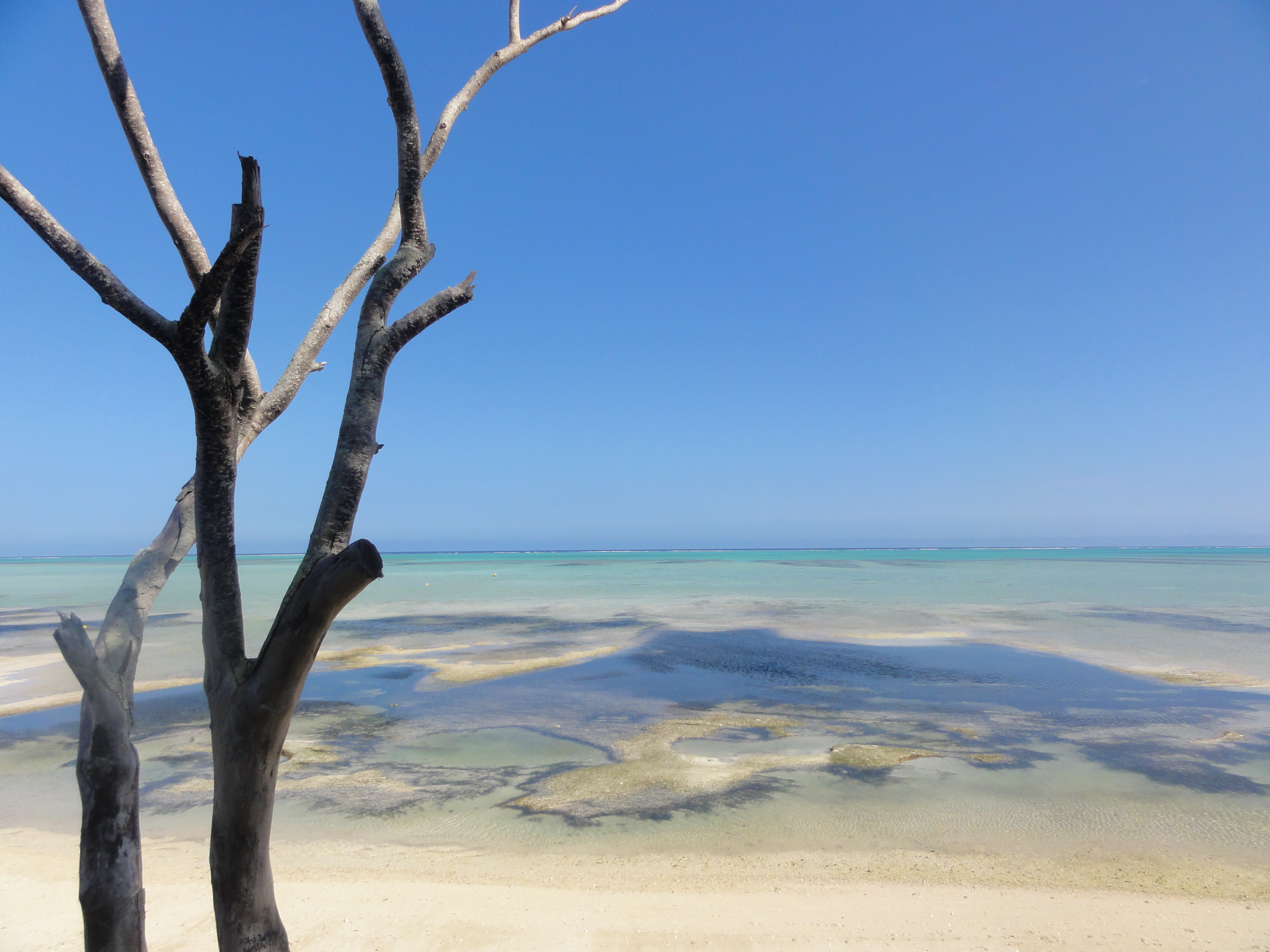
Poe beach

The beaches are open to all activities of the sea and the lagoon. During spawning season, several species of turtles nest on the beaches, and the nests are tagged and guarded. On the beach of Roche Percee, crates are arranged in nests by volunteers to protect the eggs until they hatch. On this coast there are both surf beaches and areas of water sheltered by reefs. Divers can explore the underwater wonders that are now a UNESCO World Heritage of Humanity.

In the provincial domain of Gouaro Deva, a huge project combining business, ecology and tourism aims to create, in the northern reaches of the South Province, a hub of integrated and sustainable development. While a Sheraton hotel and golf course have been constructed, as well as walking and mountain bike tracks, development is continuing as of 2015 with several projects at various stages of completion.

== Sites and monuments ==
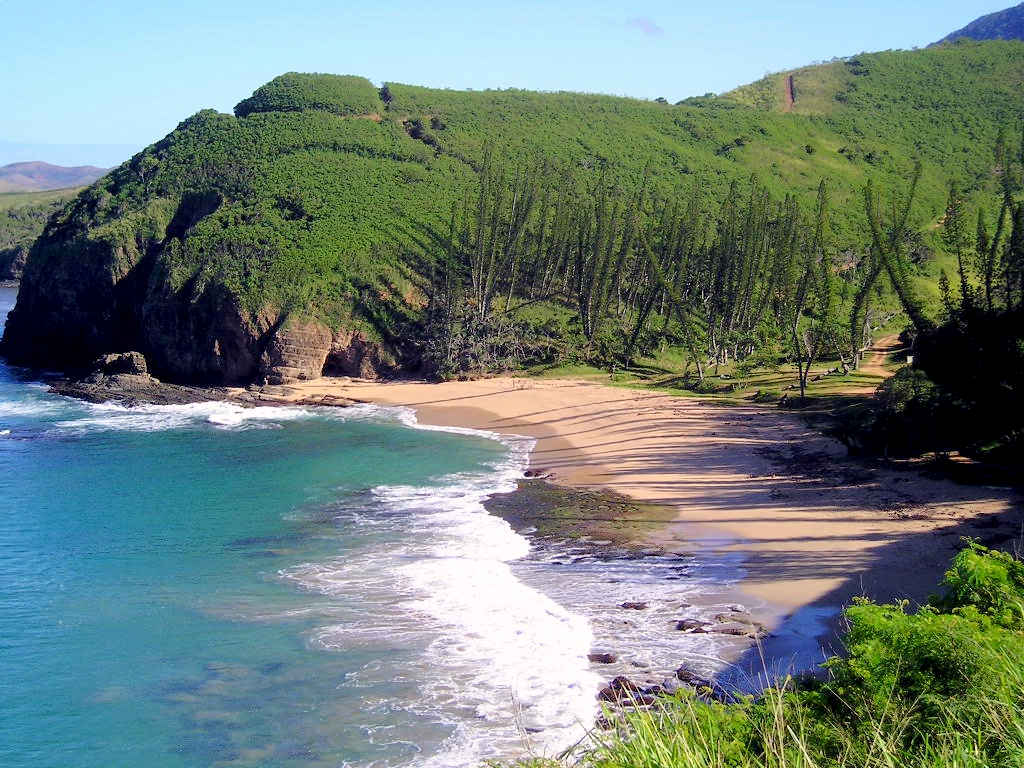
Turtle Bay

- Museum of Bourail
- Fellow of Bourail
- Turtle Bay
- Gouaro Deva
- Arab Cemetery
- Bourail New Zealand War Cemetery for deceased New Zealand personnel of the Second World War

== Events ==
=== Agricultural fair of Bourail ===
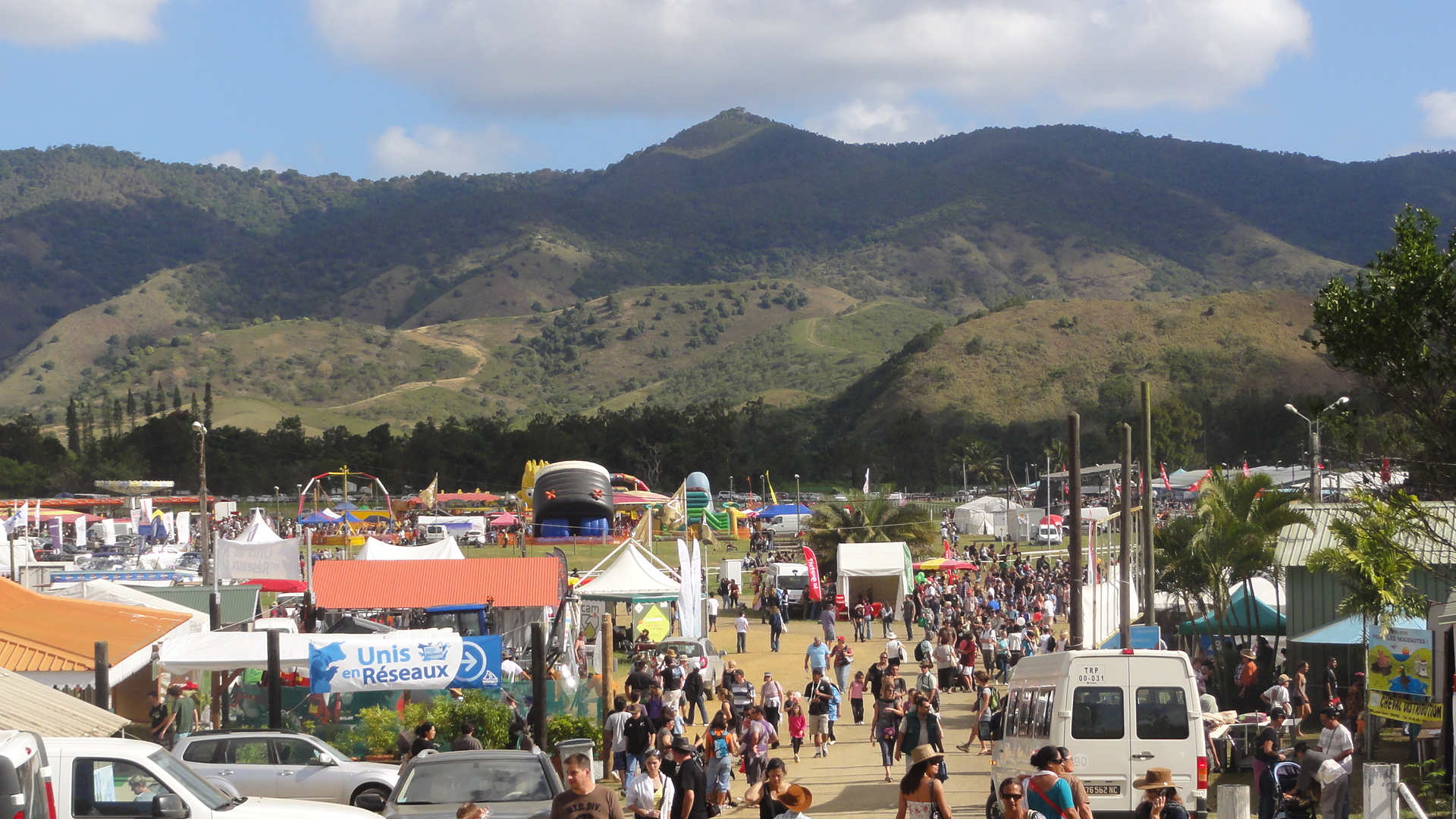
Agricultural fair Bourail

The Bourail Agricultural Fair (FEAAB) takes place every year in mid August, and is the largest annual event in New Caledonia. The event is best known for its rodeo, but also features arts and crafts, equestrian events, livestock judging, woodchopping, as well as farm machinery and commercial stands. The fair takes place on the racecourse at Téné, outside the village of Bourail, and generally attracts 20-25,000 visitors over its 3 days.

=== Fireworks ===
A fireworks display takes place every year on or about July 14 at the public square in the village.

=== Torch Pacific Games 2011 NC ===
Following the organization of the Pacific Games in New Caledonia, the "flame of the Games' passed through several municipalities of the island, including Bourail August 21, 2011. Jean-Pierre AIFA, then Mayor of Bourail, was present and the committee chair Pascale Bastien-Thiry and torchbearers. The flame arrived on horseback and was positioned on the podium near the stadium where speeches and a balloon release took place. Several events and booths were present at the Sports Hall during this special day.

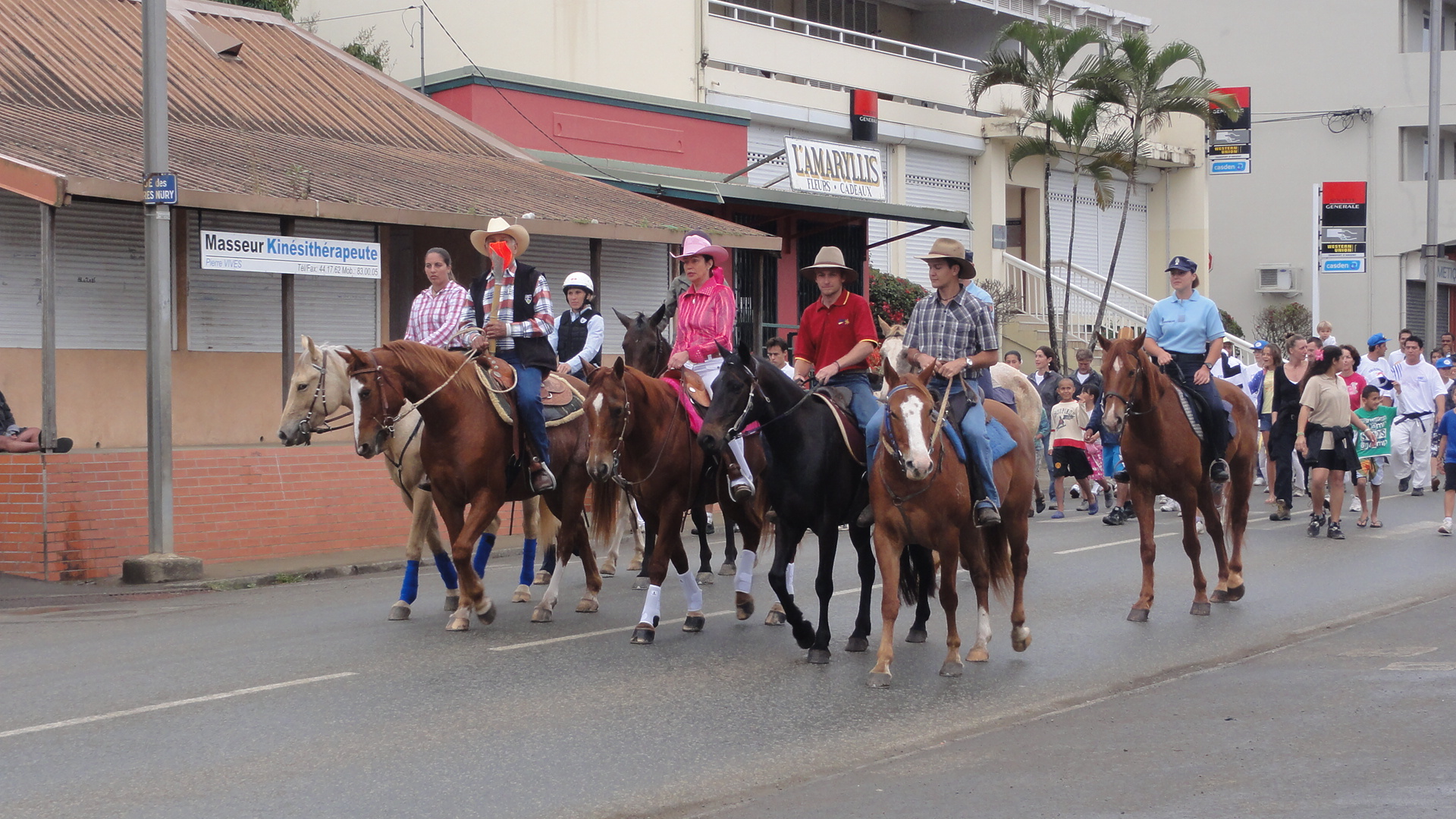

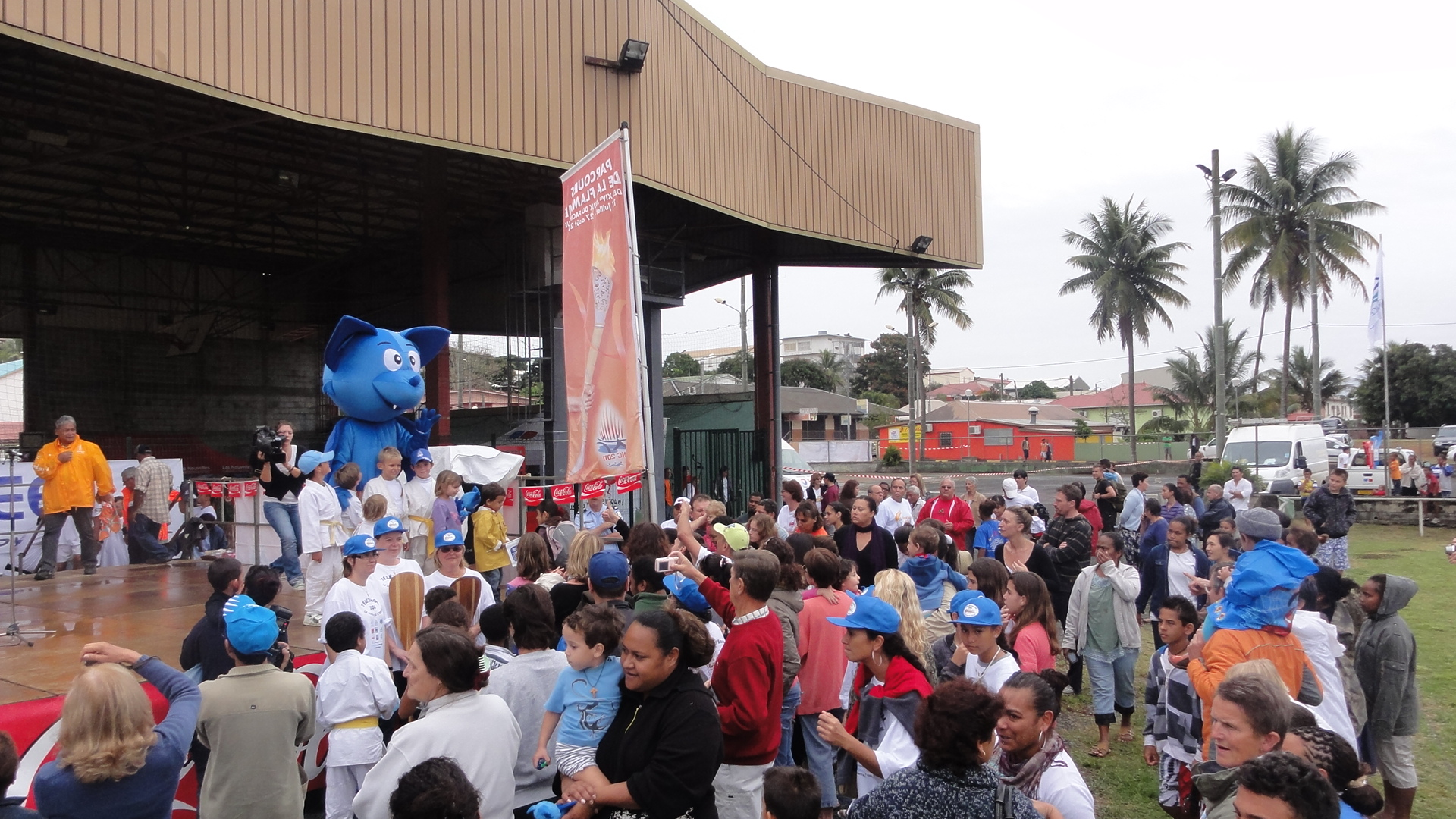

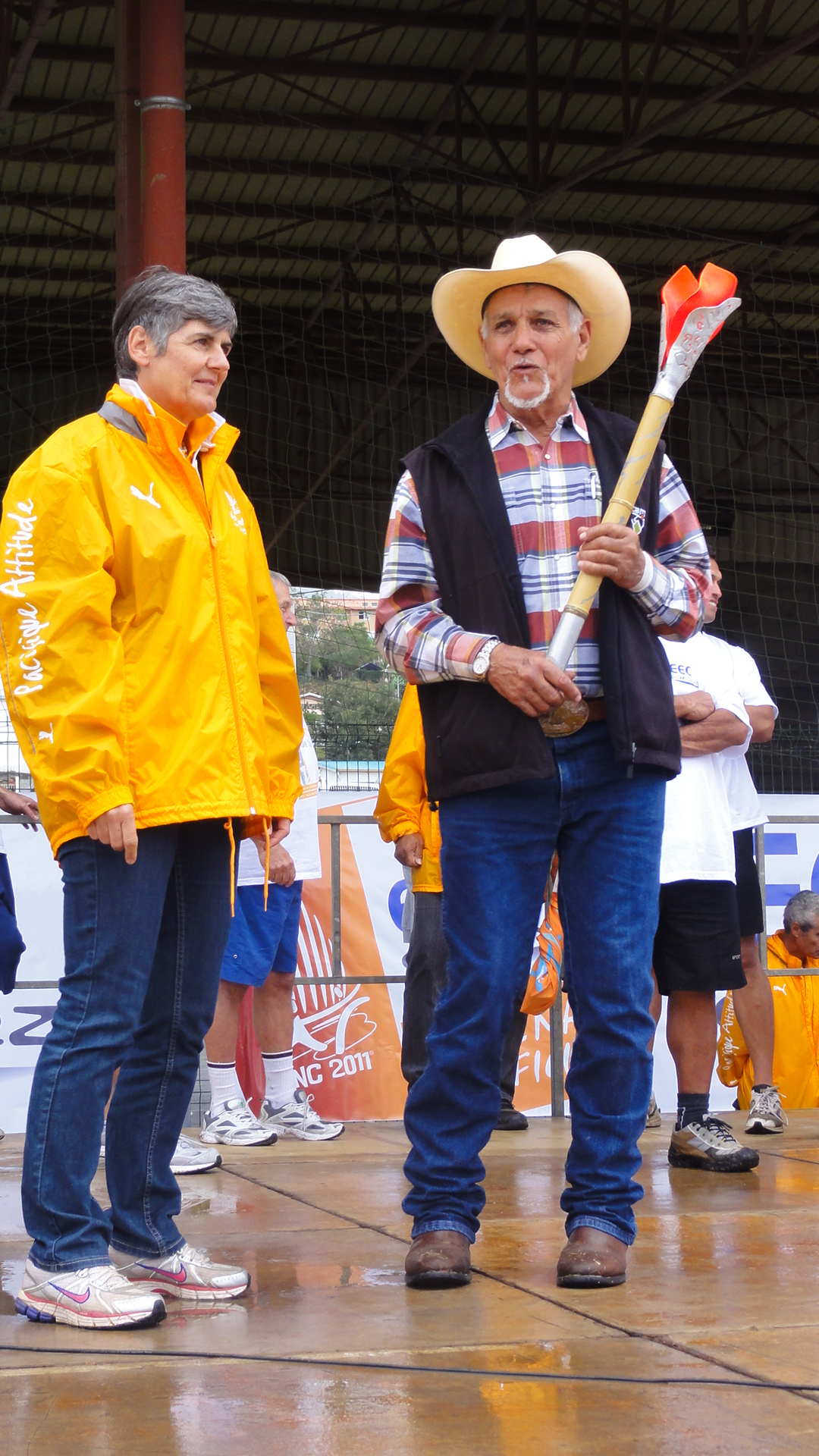

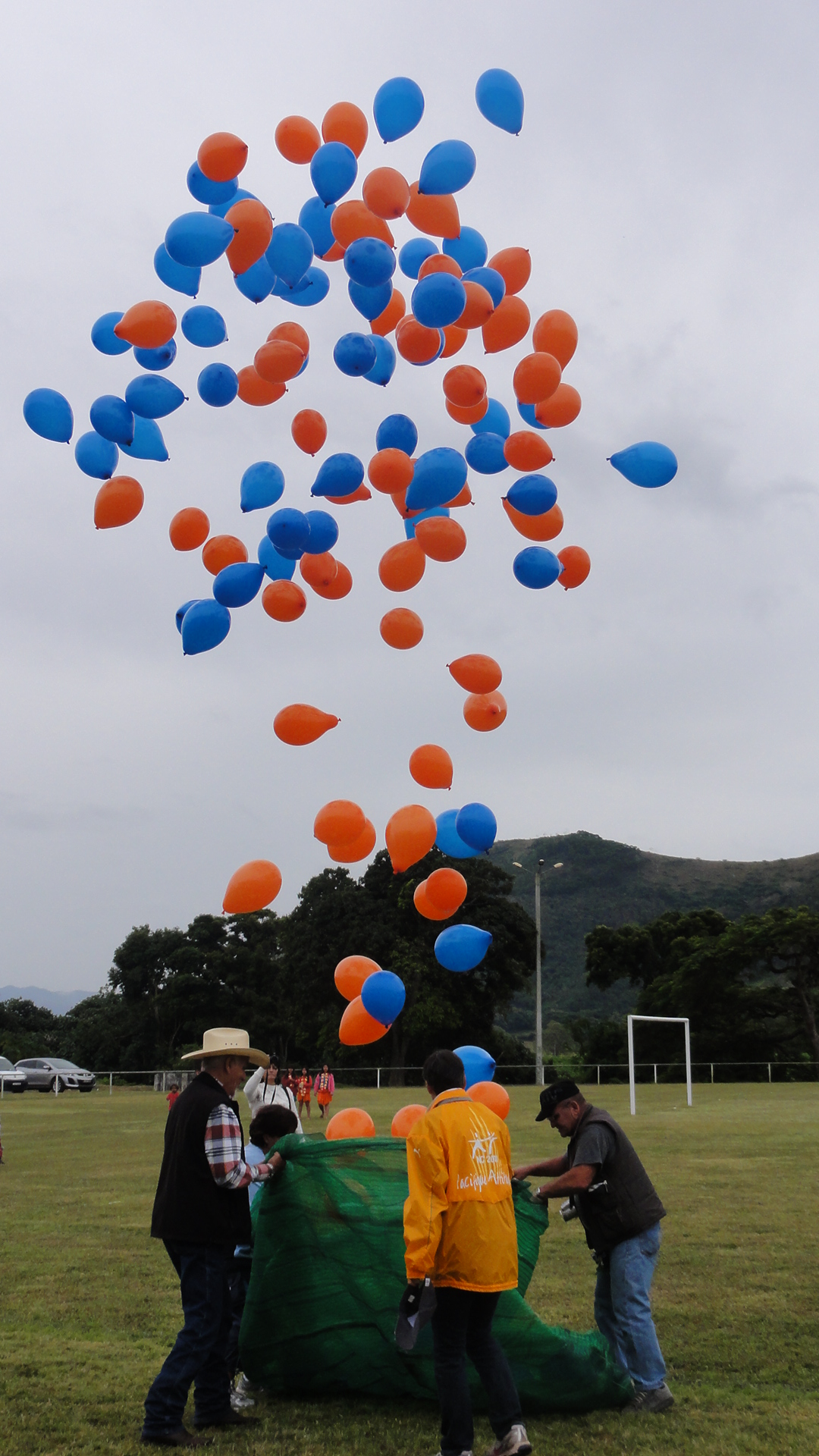
