= 2022 French presidential election in New Caledonia =

- 10 April 2022 (first round); 24 April 2022 (second round)
- Turnout: 33.35% (first round) ▼14.79pp 34.80% (second round) ▼18.01pp
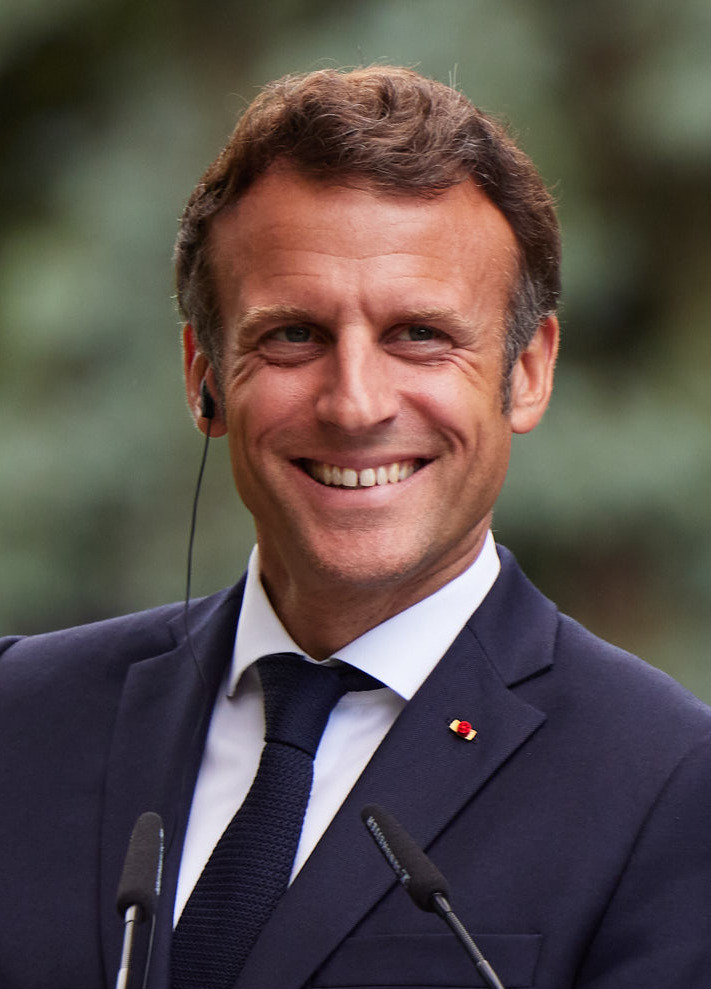

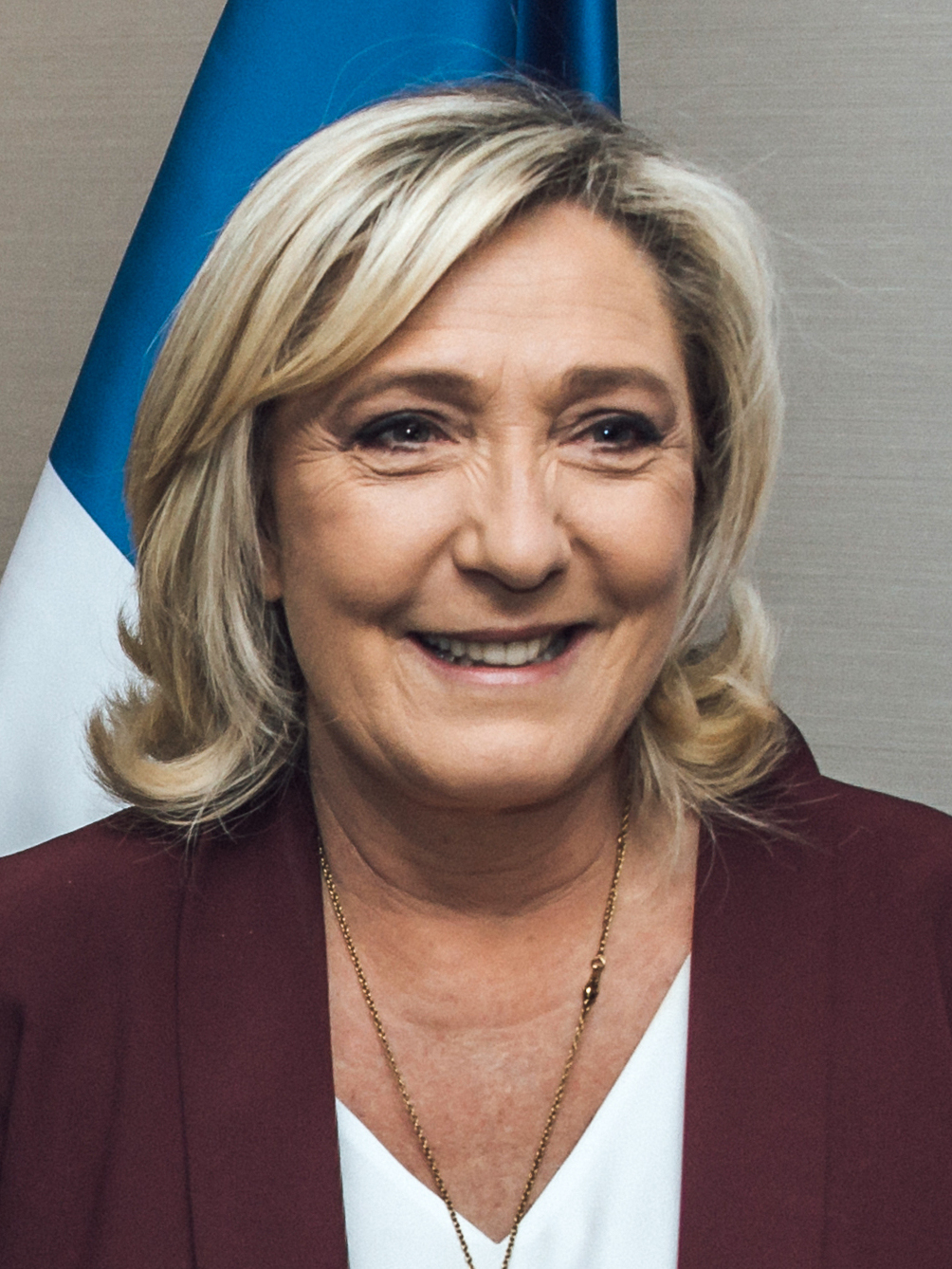

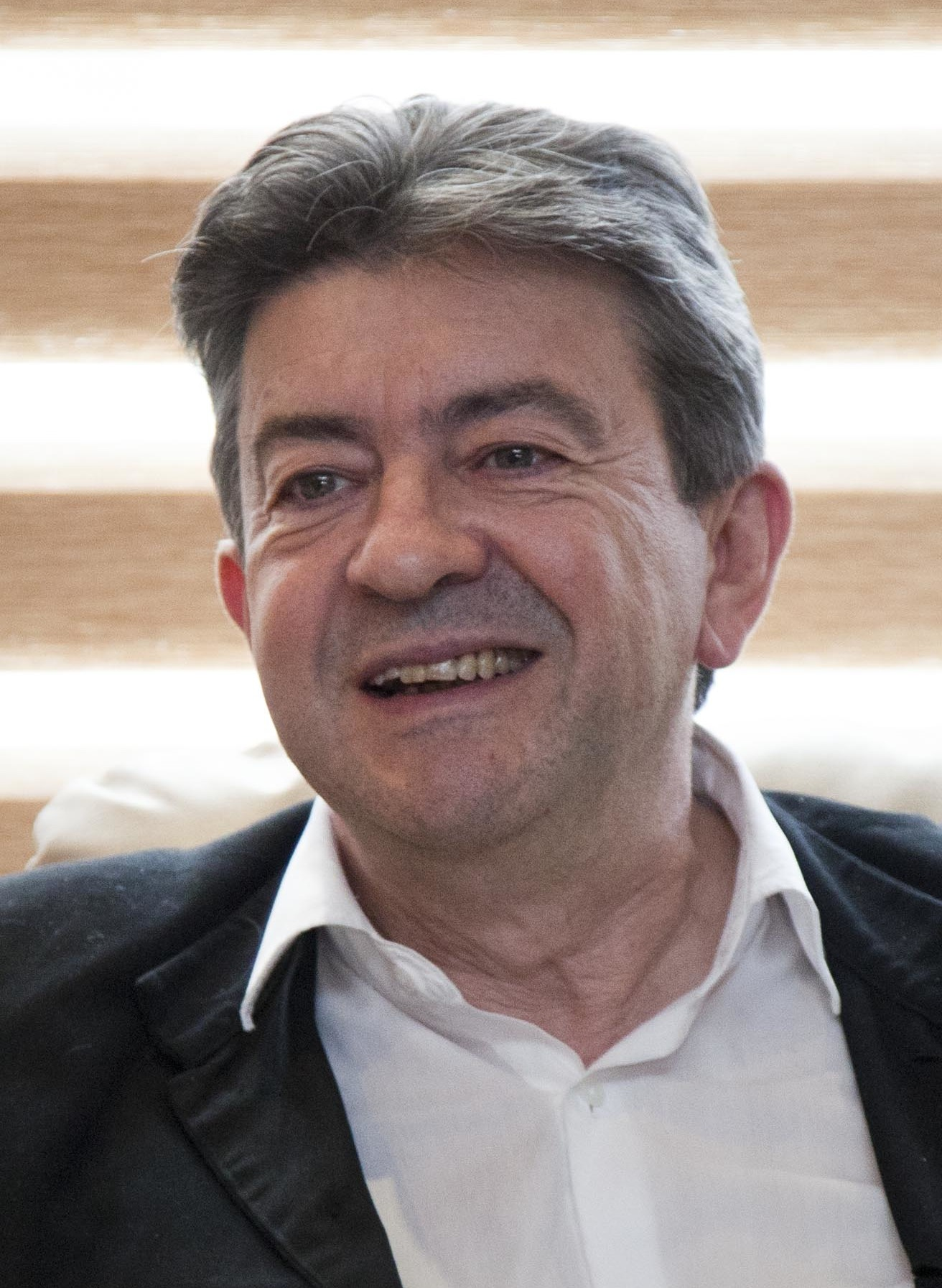

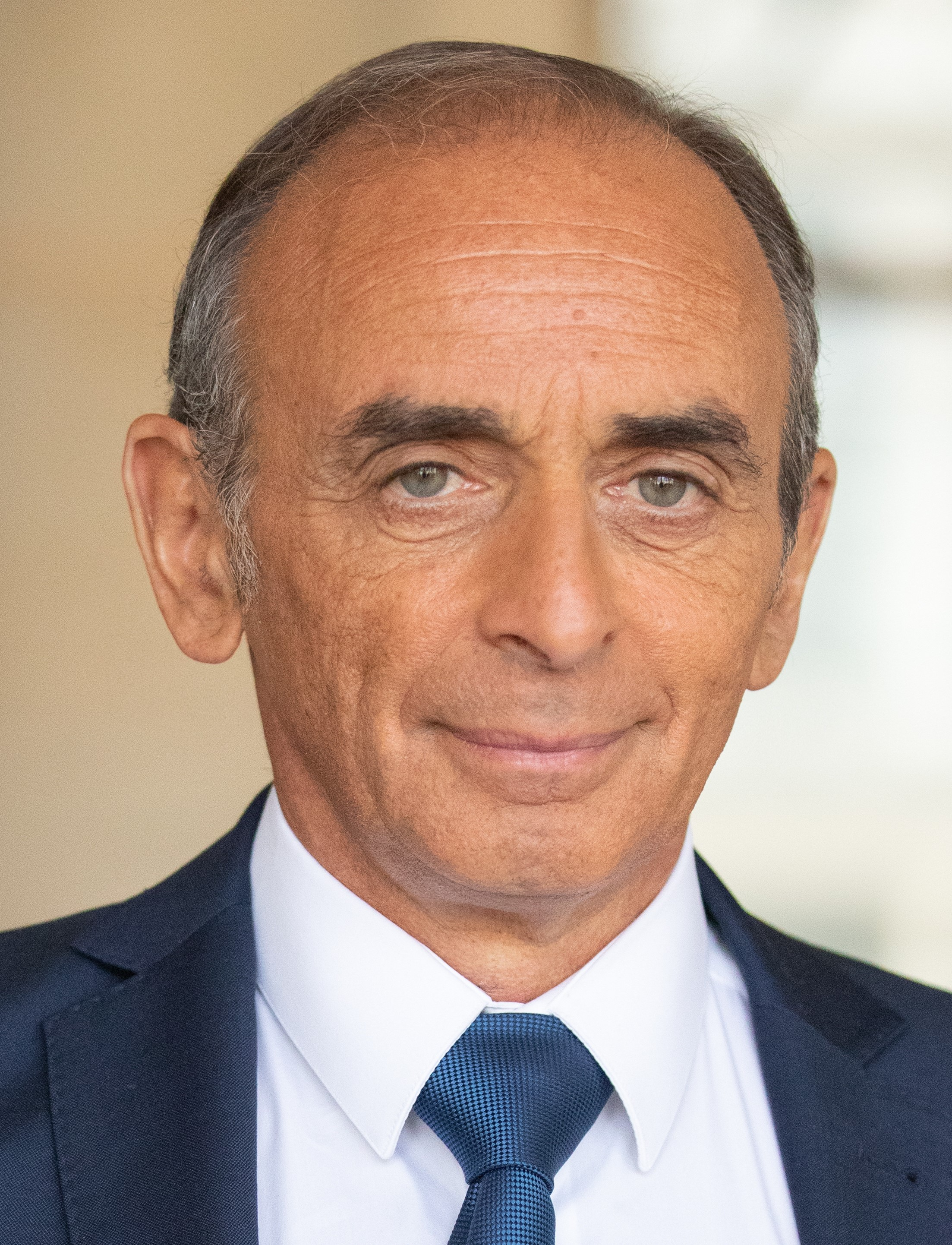

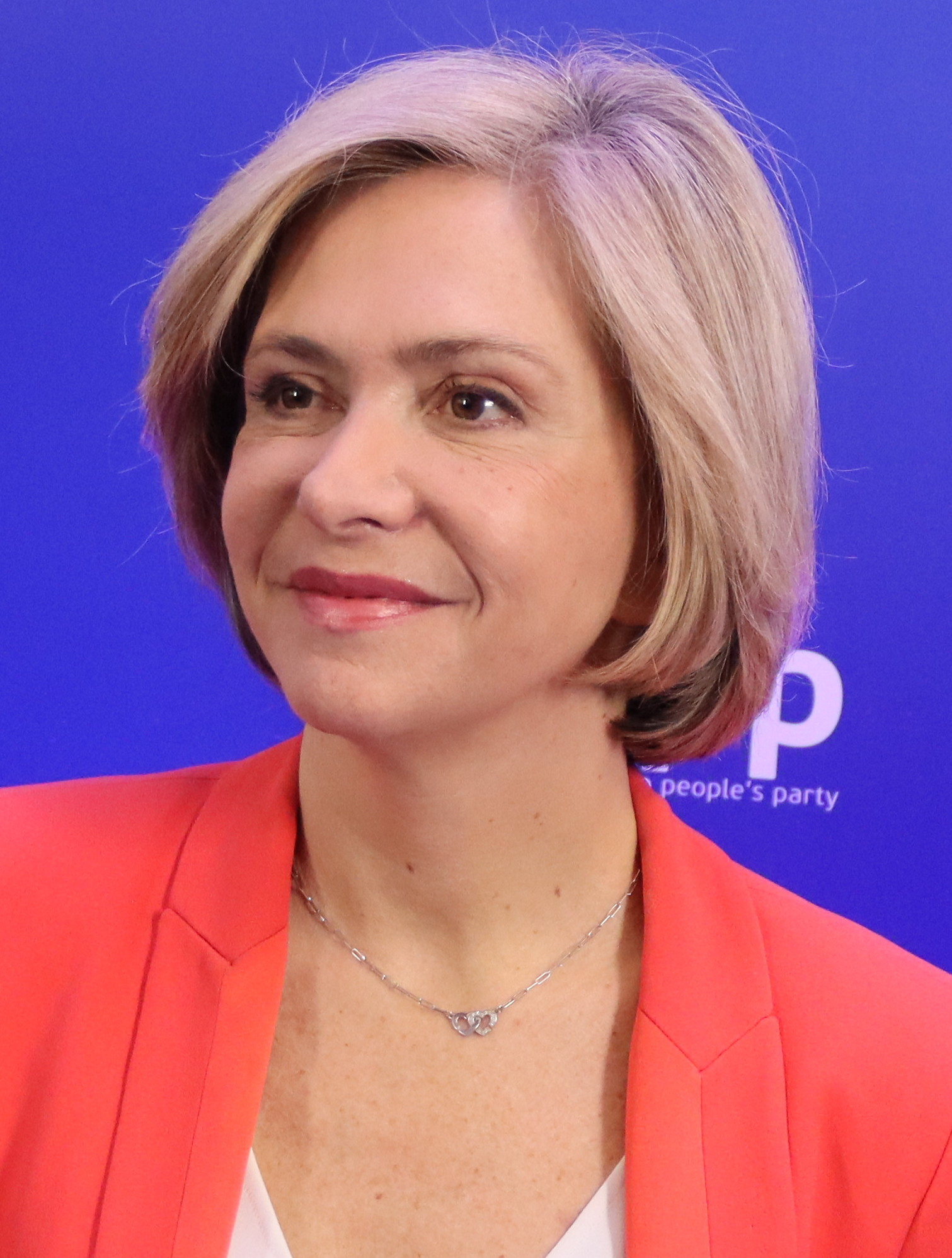
Candidate	Emmanuel Macron	Marine Le Pen	Jean-Luc Mélenchon
Party	LREM	RN	LFI
First round	28,561; 40.51%	13,273; 18.83%	9,711; 13.77%
Second round	43,795; 61.03%	27,960; 38.97%
Candidate	Éric Zemmour	Valérie Pécresse
Party	REC	LR
First round	6,435; 9.13%	4,144; 5.88%
- Results of the second round by commune
President before election
Emmanuel Macron
LREM
Elected President
Emmanuel Macron
LREM

The 2022 French presidential election in New Caledonia took place on 10 and 24 April 2022, as part of the 2022 French presidential election. As part of Overseas France (being classed as a sui generis collectivity), residents of New Caledonia are eligible to vote in French elections (including presidential elections), though a significant portion of eligible voters choose not to vote for various reasons (such as support for independence and disconnection with French politics).

With a very sharp decline in voter turnout, incumbent President Emmanuel Macron of the centre to centre-right La République En Marche ! (LREM) won a plurality of the vote in the first round and a landslide majority in the second round over Marine Le Pen of the right-wing National Rally, with Macron carrying the territory by a margin of 22.06%.

Despite a nationwide swing towards Le Pen from Macron in the second round compared to Macron's landslide victory in 2017, Macron significantly increased his margin of victory in New Caledonia by 16.92%. Additionally, New Caledonia was Macron's strongest department or territory in the first round and his second-strongest overseas territory in the second round after Wallis and Futuna. Macron also won every single commune in the territory, flipping all of the nine communes that voted for Le Pen in 2017, including the capital city of Nouméa (which Le Pen very narrowly won in 2017).

The election saw a large swing on the centre-right away from The Republicans and towards LREM. This was the first election since 1981 that neither The Republicans nor one of its predecessors (the Union for a Popular Movement (UMP) and previously Rally for the Republic (RPR)) won the most first round votes in the territory. Furthermore, the traditional centre-left party, the Socialist Party, also performed poorly in the territory, with left-leaning voters flocking to La France Insoumise (LFI), a left-wing party, as well as LREM. The shift was inline with a broader nationwide collapse in the support for the two parties, considered France's two major parties until 2017.

== Background ==
As New Caledonia is a sui generis collectivity of France, residents of the archipelago are eligible to vote in both local and French elections. However, like many residents of other overseas territories, many New Caledonians choose not to vote in French elections, so voter turnout is lower than in Metropolitan France.

In the 2017 presidential election, The Republicans (whose nominee was former Prime Minister François Fillon) won the most votes in the territory, continuing a long historical pattern of voting for centre-right parties, though they were closely challenged by the right-wing National Rally (whose nominee was Marine Le Pen, the party's leader and president). Nationwide, however, the top two candidates were former Economics and Finance Minister Emmanuel Macron of the centrist to centre-right En Marche ! party and Le Pen of the National Rally, the latter party narrowly overtaking The Republicans nationwide to reach the runoff. The second round in New Caledonia saw Macron narrowly carry the territory with 52.57% of the vote. However, Le Pen won several communes, including the capital city of Nouméa (albeit with a narrow 50.90% of the vote).

For the 2022 election, Macron and Le Pen were again nominated for their respective parties, with En Marche ! renaming themselves to La République En Marche ! (LREM; French for "The Republic on the Move!"). The Republicans nominated former Budget Minister Valérie Pécresse, while the main left-wing opposition, La France Insoumise (LFI), nominated former Minister Delegate for National Education Jean-Luc Mélenchon. Other smaller parties also nominated candidates, such as the right-wing Reconquête party, who nominated party president Éric Zemmour. In the second round between Le Pen and Macron, Zemmour endorsed Le Pen, Pécresse endorsed Macron and Mélenchon urged voters to vote against Le Pen without directly endorsing Macron.

== Results ==
Candidate	Party	First round		Second round	
Candidate	Party	Votes	%	Votes	%
Emmanuel Macron	La République En Marche!	28,561	40.51	43,795	61.03
Marine Le Pen	National Rally	13,273	18.83	27,960	38.97
Jean-Luc Mélenchon	La France Insoumise	9,711	13.77		
Éric Zemmour	Reconquête	6,435	9.13		
Valérie Pécresse	The Republicans	4,144	5.88		
Nicolas Dupont-Aignan	Debout la France	2,697	3.83		
Yannick Jadot	Europe Ecology – The Greens	2,161	3.07		
Jean Lassalle	Résistons!	1,031	1.46		
Anne Hidalgo	Socialist Party	963	1.37		
Nathalie Arthaud	Workers' Struggle	565	0.80		
Philippe Poutou	New Anticapitalist Party	560	0.79		
Fabien Roussel	French Communist Party	399	0.57		
Total		70,500	100.00	71,755	100.00
Valid votes		70,500	96.62	71,755	94.26
Invalid votes		689	0.94	1,337	1.76
Blank votes		1,777	2.44	3,030	3.98
Total votes		72,966	100.00	76,122	100.00
Registered voters/turnout		218,773	33.35	218,713	34.80
Source: Minister of the Interior

=== First round ===
==== Results by commune ====
Commune	Province	Emmanuel Macron		Marine Le Pen		Jean-Luc Mélenchon		Éric Zemmour		Valérie Pécresse		Nicolas Dupont-Aignan		Yannick Jadot		Jean Lassalle		Anne Hidalgo		Nathalie Arthaud		Philippe Poutou		Fabien Roussel		Turnout		
Commune	Province	Votes	%	Votes	%	Votes	%	Votes	%	Votes	%	Votes	%	Votes	%	Votes	%	Votes	%	Votes	%	Votes	%	Votes	%	Votes	%	±
Belep	North	10	19.23%	3	5.77%	30	57.69%	2	3.85%	2	3.85%	0	0.00%	1	1.92%	0	0.00%	1	1.92%	1	1.92%	2	3.85%	0	0.00%	53	5.67%	–17.73%
Boulouparis	South	606	42.41%	359	25.12%	90	6.30%	153	10.71%	96	6.72%	63	4.41%	19	1.33%	13	0.91%	10	0.70%	8	0.56%	9	0.63%	3	0.21%	1,463	44.60%	–14.93%
Bourail	South	808	45.09%	404	22.54%	162	9.04%	136	7.59%	87	4.85%	81	4.52%	36	2.01%	27	1.51%	13	0.73%	9	0.50%	19	1.06%	10	0.56%	1,840	39.49%	–15.87%
Canala	North	47	19.92%	9	3.81%	106	44.92%	4	1.69%	20	8.47%	14	5.93%	11	4.66%	0	0.00%	5	2.12%	10	4.24%	4	1.69%	6	2.54%	264	7.36%	–13.33%
Dumbéa	South	3,729	40.02%	2,028	21.76%	1,067	11.45%	788	8.46%	663	7.12%	366	3.93%	212	2.28%	135	1.45%	119	1.28%	86	0.92%	76	0.82%	49	0.53%	9,691	42.61%	–18.80%
Farino	South	178	45.29%	110	27.99%	20	5.09%	26	6.62%	23	5.85%	15	3.82%	4	1.02%	9	2.29%	6	1.53%	0	0.00%	2	0.51%	0	0.00%	409	61.32%	–9.41%
Hienghène	North	45	13.27%	20	5.90%	210	61.95%	10	2.95%	12	3.54%	5	1.47%	9	2.65%	4	1.18%	7	2.06%	8	2.36%	5	1.47%	4	1.18%	354	14.14%	–31.16%
Houaïlou	North	92	29.68%	21	6.77%	140	45.16%	10	3.23%	12	3.87%	7	2.26%	3	0.97%	3	0.97%	9	2.90%	0	0.00%	11	3.55%	2	2.65%	344	9.18%	–22.22%
Isle of Pines	South	77	30.80%	16	6.40%	83	33.20%	2	0.80%	46	18.40%	5	2.00%	5	2.00%	0	0.00%	5	2.00%	8	3.20%	2	0.80%	1	0.40%	261	14.17%	–10.38%
Kaala-Gomen	North	88	33.08%	58	21.80%	60	22.56%	17	6.39%	20	7.52%	3	1.13%	1	0.38%	3	1.13%	6	2.26%	5	1.88%	5	1.88%	0	0.00%	278	15.86%	–5.29%
Koné	North	411	37.30%	215	19.51%	262	23.77%	46	4.17%	52	4.72%	20	1.81%	24	2.18%	16	1.45%	21	1.91%	12	1.09%	13	1.18%	10	0.91%	1,172	23.03%	–18.93%
Kouaoua	North	63	30.14%	12	5.74%	73	34.93%	7	3.35%	33	15.79%	5	2.39%	0	0.00%	0	0.00%	6	2.87%	3	1.44%	6	2.87%	1	0.48%	221	18.54%	–16.51%
Koumac	North	347	38.47%	254	28.16%	98	10.86%	67	7.43%	55	6.10%	27	2.99%	18	2.00%	10	1.11%	9	1.00%	9	1.00%	4	0.44%	4	0.44%	931	29.84%	–20.51%
La Foa	South	653	46.21%	271	19.18%	167	11.82%	107	7.57%	91	6.44%	41	2.90%	26	1.84%	15	1.06%	10	0.71%	12	0.85%	15	1.06%	5	0.35%	1,465	42.65%	–17.58%
Le Mont-Dore	South	3,549	40.10%	1,825	20.62%	1,041	11.76%	774	8.75%	581	6.56%	362	4.09%	232	2.62%	143	1.62%	119	1.34%	95	1.07%	78	0.88%	51	0.58%	9,224	41.76%	–15.65%
Lifou	Loyalty Islands	187	18.42%	41	4.04%	602	59.31%	29	2.86%	54	5.32%	19	1.87%	10	0.99%	8	0.79%	24	2.36%	17	1.67%	16	1.58%	8	0.79%	1,467	9.60%	–4.54%
Maré	Loyalty Islands	66	19.64%	18	5.36%	183	54.46%	6	1.79%	23	6.85%	5	1.49%	7	2.08%	2	0.60%	14	4.17%	7	2.08%	4	1.19%	1	0.30%	342	4.93%	–4.09%
Moindou	South	144	46.75%	73	23.70%	45	14.61%	14	4.55%	11	3.57%	6	1.95%	3	0.97%	3	0.97%	4	1.30%	0	0.00%	3	0.97%	2	0.65%	343	41.78%	–15.48%
Nouméa	South	13,839	42.98%	5,635	17.50%	3,259	10.12%	3,540	10.99%	1,750	5.43%	1,295	4.02%	1,383	4.29%	519	1.61%	424	1.32%	175	0.54%	200	0.62%	183	0.57%	33,123	45.63%	–17.32%
Ouégoa	North	140	41.92%	62	18.56%	99	22.64%	17	5.09%	7	2.10%	2	0.60%	1	0.30%	0	0.00%	3	0.90%	2	0.60%	0	0.00%	1	0.30%	340	15.30%	–10.27%
Ouvéa	Loyalty Islands	25	17.36%	2	1.39%	71	49.31%	26	18.06%	2	1.39%	4	2.78%	2	1.39%	0	0.00%	4	2.78%	2	1.39%	5	3.47%	1	0.69%	149	3.38%	–6.60%
Païta	South	2,398	41.08%	1,331	22.80%	606	10.38%	509	8.72%	343	5.88%	272	4.66%	92	1.58%	81	1.39%	66	1.13%	60	1.03%	44	0.75%	36	0.62%	6,080	38.35%	–20.48%
Poindimié	North	136	26.20%	47	9.06%	237	45.66%	17	3.28%	22	4.24%	13	2.50%	18	3.47%	5	0.96%	8	1.54%	4	0.77%	9	1.73%	3	0.58%	539	12.37%	–19.84%
Ponérihouen	North	50	23.26%	18	8.37%	117	54.42%	6	2.79%	7	3.26%	3	1.40%	1	0.47%	3	1.40%	4	1.86%	3	1.40%	2	0.93%	1	0.47%	230	8.54%	–16.23%
Pouébo	North	15	13.16%	4	3.51%	71	62.28%	5	4.39%	3	2.63%	0	0.00%	2	1.75%	2	1.75%	7	6.14%	0	0.00%	1	0.88%	4	3.51%	118	4.89%	–15.19%
Pouembout	North	241	38.81%	116	18.68%	116	18.68%	40	6.44%	30	4.83%	18	2.98%	21	3.38%	7	1.13%	18	2.90%	5	0.81%	5	0.81%	4	0.64%	635	35.01%	–14.68%
Poum	North	41	25.15%	13	7.98%	76	46.63%	7	4.29%	5	3.07%	1	0.61%	3	1.84%	6	3.68%	3	1.84%	2	1.23%	4	2.45%	2	1.23%	167	11.23%	–7.04%
Poya	North	257	42.41%	122	20.13%	112	18.48%	39	6.44%	36	5.94%	11	1.82%	2	0.33%	6	0.99%	10	1.65%	5	0.83%	1	0.17%	5	0.83%	628	24.67%	–10.63%
Poya	South	257	42.41%	122	20.13%	112	18.48%	39	6.44%	36	5.94%	11	1.82%	2	0.33%	6	0.99%	10	1.65%	5	0.83%	1	0.17%	5	0.83%	628	24.67%	–10.63%
Sarraméa	South	25	26.60%	19	20.21%	40	42.55%	1	1.06%	2	2.13%	7	7.45%	0	0.00%	0	0.00%	0	0.00%	0	0.00%	0	0.00%	0	0.00%	99	18.61%	–13.18%
Thio	South	70	35.90%	25	12.82%	61	31.28%	4	2.05%	9	4.62%	7	3.59%	3	1.54%	3	1.54%	6	3.08%	5	2.56%	2	1.03%	0	0.00%	205	9.22%	–14.59%
Touho	North	56	20.07%	31	11.11%	141	50.54%	10	3.58%	18	6.45%	5	1.79%	3	1.08%	1	0.36%	2	0.72%	6	2.15%	5	1.79%	1	0.36%	288	14.36%	–13.56%
Voh	North	136	25.81%	109	20.68%	208	39.47%	13	2.47%	17	3.23%	12	2.28%	7	1.33%	4	0.76%	13	2.47%	1	0.19%	6	1.14%	1	0.19%	545	22.27%	–14.24%
Yaté	South	32	24.81%	2	1.55%	58	44.96%	3	2.33%	12	9.30%	3	2.33%	2	1.55%	3	2.33%	7	5.43%	5	3.88%	2	1.55%	0	0.00%	136	7.56%	–18.48%
Total		28,561	40.51%	13,273	18.83%	9,711	13.77%	6,435	9.13%	4,144	5.88%	2,697	3.83%	2,161	3.07%	1,031	1.46%	963	1.37%	565	0.80%	560	0.79%	399	0.57%	72,966	33.35%	–14.79%
Source: Ministry of Interior (in French)

==== Analysis ====
For the first time since the party's foundation in 2016, La République En Marche ! (LREM) won a plurality of the vote in New Caledonia. The party's nominee, President Emmanuel Macron, received 40.51% of the vote, making New Caledonia one of three overseas territories that voted for him (the other two being the fellow Pacific Island territories of French Polynesia and Wallis and Futuna). Additionally, Macron received a higher vote percentage in New Caledonia than in any other overseas territory, region and department in the entirety of France. Macron polled strongly in communes that opposed independence at the 2018 and 2020 referendums (mostly located in the South Province), centre-right strongholds that, in 2017, voted for either the centre-right Republicans (who nominated former Prime Minister François Fillon) or the right-wing National Rally (who nominated party leader and president Marine Le Pen, doing so again in this election). Macron also won the most votes in three communes that voted for independence, those being (in order of highest to lowest margin) Koné, Thio and Kaala-Gomen, as well as the split commune of Poya (where the northern half voted firmly for independence while the southern half almost universally voted against it, with the votes reported separately for Poya-Nord and Poya-Sud). Koné, Poya and Thio were three of the six communes in the North Province that voted for Macron in the first round, the other three being Ouégoa, Pouembout and Koumac. Additionally, Macron came second in every commune that he did not win except for Ouvéa in the Loyalty Islands, where right-wing Reconquête candidate Éric Zemmour narrowly outpolled him. Overall, the commune that Macron polled best in was Moindou in the South, where he received 46.75% of the vote.

Unlike in 2017, Le Pen failed to win the most votes in a single commune in 2022. Her support was mostly concentrated in rural communes and on the outskirts of Greater Nouméa, reflecting her party's conservative, French nationalist and predominantly Caldoche (White French) supporter base in the territory. However, she polled below average in Nouméa (the capital city) itself, which is a moderate and ethnically diverse city that tends to vote for The Republicans, but voted for Macron for the first time in 2022. Overall, the commune that Le Pen polled best in was Koumac in the North, despite being strongest in the South. Zemmour's Reconquête, regarded as further right of Le Pen's National Rally but targeting similar demographics and voters, took some of Le Pen's vote from 2017 and polled fairly well, coming fourth in New Caledonia. His best commune was Ouvéa in the Loyalty Islands, which was the only commune in which Macron did not come second or first, with Zemmour receiving an unusual 18.06% of the vote and just one more vote than Macron (26 to 25), allowing him to come second in the commune.

Jean-Luc Mélenchon of La France Insoumise (LFI), then-president of La France Insoumise Group (LFI Group) in the National Assembly, was the main left-wing candidate. He managed to claim the vast majority of the vote that went to the centre-left Socialist Party's nominee in 2017, former National Education Minister and former Social Economy Minister Benoît Hamon. Mélenchon won the most votes in every single commune that voted for independence in 2018 and 2022 (which are majority or plurality Kanak) other than the four that Macron won, including a clean sweep of the three Loyalty Islands communes (Lifou, Maré and Ouvéa) as well as all but six communes in the North (the same six Macron won). However, the votes in two of these (both of being Kanak-majority areas that voted for Fillon in 2017) were quite close, with Mélenchon only defeating Macron by just 10 votes in Kouaoua and just seven on the Isle of Pines, which was the most marginal commune in the territory and among the closest in the country. The Isle of Pines was also one of only three communes in the South that Mélenchon won, the other two being Yaté and Sarraméa.

The popularity of the two traditional major parties, the Socialist Party on the centre-left and The Republicans on the centre-right, collapsed across France, with both parties receiving their worst ever presidential election results. The Socialists, who nominated Parisian Mayor Anne Hidalgo, suffered a huge swing away from them at the cost of Mélenchon's LFI and to an lesser extent Macron's LREM. Meanwhile, The Republicans, who nominated former Budget Minister Valérie Pécresse, mostly lost their votes at the expense of Macron's LREM and Le Pen's National Rally. In New Caledonia, Macron clearly won the majority of Republican voters, with Le Pen's vote remaining stable and decreasing in the second round. Hidalgo's best commune was Pouébo in the North (where she won 6.14% of the vote). By far Pécresse's two best communes were Isle of Pines in the South (18.40%) and Kouaoua in the North (15.79%), with Pécresse's double digit vote in these two communes (both Kanak-majority communes that Fillon won) having prevented Macron from winning the most votes in them.

While voter turnout is normally lower in New Caledonia, largely due to the major independence movement on the archipelago, turnout in 2022 was extraordinarily low, with just 33.35% of registered voters voting in the first round, a drop of 14.79%. Double digit drops in turnout percentages were recorded in most communes, and even anti-independence voters largely abstained. The only commune were the majority of voters cast ballots was Farino, a landlocked, rural and predominantly Caldoche commune in the South that staunchly opposes independence and supports conservative parties, having overwhelmingly voted for Le Pen in 2017 before a huge swing delivered the commune to Macron in 2022. In Farino, 61.32% of voters turned out to vote, reflecting the commune's longstanding high voter turnout. Ouvéa in the Loyalty Islands had the lowest turnout, at just 3.38%.

=== Second round ===
==== Results by commune ====
Commune	Province	Emmanuel Macron			Marine Le Pen			Turnout		
Commune	Province	Votes	%	±	Votes	%	±	Votes	%	±
Belep	North	39	86.67%	–6.01%	6	13.33%	+6.01%	48	5.14%	–27.31%
Boulouparis	South	820	53.84%	+22.67%	703	46.16%	–22.67%	1,580	48.17%	–15.16%
Bourail	South	1,170	59.24%	+20.84%	805	40.76%	–20.84%	2,073	44.51%	–20.42%
Canala	North	123	84.25%	–5.87%	15.75%	15.75%	+5.87%	164	4.57%	–30.93%
Dumbéa	South	5,686	58.06%	+16.38%	4,107	41.94%	–16.38%	10,381	45.68%	–17.41%
Farino	South	229	54.52%	+28.65%	191	45.48%	–28.65%	432	64.77%	–15.26%
Hienghène	North	142	83.53%	–12.38%	28	16.47%	+12.38%	193	7.71%	–37.59%
Houaïlou	North	192	78.37%	–6.95%	53	21.63%	+6.95%	290	7.74%	–29.04%
Isle of Pines	South	224	80.87%	–2.08%	53	19.13%	+2.08%	302	16.40%	–17.29%
Kaala-Gomen	North	147	60.74%	–10.28%	95	39.26%	+10.28%	254	14.49%	–25.00%
Koné	North	693	63.52%	–5.00%	398	36.48%	+5.00%	1,172	23.03%	–28.92%
Kouaoua	North	140	77.78%	–5.76%	40	22.22%	+5.76%	205	17.20%	–29.69%
Koumac	North	597	53.49%	+17.14%	519	46.51%	–17.14%	1,183	37.92%	–20.23%
La Foa	South	961	58.60%	+16.46%	679	19.77%	–16.46%	1,711	49.83%	–17.63%
Le Mont-Dore	South	5,288	57.38%	+14.98%	3,927	42.62%	–14.98%	9,899	44.84%	–15.65%
Lifou	Loyalty Islands	454	76.95%	–11.84%	136	23.05%	+11.84%	664	6.05%	–15.06%
Maré	Loyalty Islands	225	72.12%	–14.88%	87	27.88%	+14.88%	331	4.77%	–8.83%
Moindou	South	216	65.45%	+12.39%	114	34.55%	–12.39%	343	41.78%	–22.40%
Nouméa	South	20,588	63.35%	+14.25%	11,912	36.65%	–14.25%	34,291	47.24%	–15.61%
Ouégoa	North	210	63.64%	+11.00%	120	36.36%	–11.00%	347	15.62%	–23.51%
Ouvéa	Loyalty Islands	84	73.04%	–18.32%	31	26.96%	+18.32%	128	2.90%	–10.82%
Païta	South	3,678	56.20%	+14.80%	2,866	43.80%	–14.80%	6,886	43.48%	–18.84%
Poindimié	North	336	70.00%	–13.19%	144	30.00%	+13.19%	558	12.80%	–31.76%
Ponérihouen	North	102	73.91%	–10.31%	36	26.09%	+10.31%	152	5.64%	–34.85%
Pouébo	North	35	83.33%	–8.35%	7	16.67%	+8.35%	48	1.99%	–24.40%
Pouembout	North	396	60.46%	+4.31%	259	39.54%	–4.31%	702	38.74%	–21.87%
Poum	North	77	69.37%	–4.56%	34	30.63%	+4.56%	118	7.94%	–22.23%
Poya	North	341	59.00%	+2.26%	237	41.00%	–2.26%	624	24.51%	–21.67%
Poya	South	341	59.00%	+2.26%	237	41.00%	–2.26%	624	24.51%	–21.67%
Sarraméa	South	146	57.14%	–12.72%	63	30.14%	+12.72%	102	19.17%	–26.30%
Thio	South	96	58.18%	–14.52%	69	41.82%	+14.52%	176	7.91%	–24.51%
Touho	North	130	73.03%	–10.90%	48	26.97%	+10.90%	205	10.22%	–34.21%
Voh	North	249	58.45%	–6.08%	177	41.55%	+6.08%	447	18.27%	–31.91%
Yaté	South	75	81.52%	–11.00%	17	18.48%	+11.00%	113	6.28%	–32.67%
Total		43,795	61.03%	+8.46%	27,969	38.97%	–8.46%	76,122	34.80%	–18.01%
Source: Minister of the Interior (in French)

===== Communes that flipped =====
Commune	Province	Previous winner		Swing	Subsequent winner	
Commune	Province	Candidate	%	Swing	%	Candidate
Boulouparis	South	Marine Le Pen	68.83%	22.67%	53.84%	Emmanuel Macron
Bourail	South	Marine Le Pen	61.60%	20.84%	59.24%	Emmanuel Macron
Dumbéa	South	Marine Le Pen	58.32%	16.38%	58.06%	Emmanuel Macron
Farino	South	Marine Le Pen	74.13%	28.65%	54.52%	Emmanuel Macron
Koumac	North	Marine Le Pen	63.65%	17.14%	53.49%	Emmanuel Macron
La Foa	South	Marine Le Pen	57.86%	16.46%	58.60%	Emmanuel Macron
Le Mont-Dore	South	Marine Le Pen	57.60%	14.98%	57.38%	Emmanuel Macron
Nouméa	South	Marine Le Pen	50.90%	14.25%	63.35%	Emmanuel Macron
Païta	South	Marine Le Pen	58.60%	14.80%	56.20%	Emmanuel Macron

==== Analysis ====
In the second round, Emmanuel Macron and La République En Marche ! (LREM) carried all of New Caledonia's 33 communes. This made New Caledonia the only region of France in which Marine Le Pen and the National Rally failed to win a single commune other than Wallis and Futuna (which is not split into communes). Macron's strongest commune was Belep, a remote and almost entirely Kanak island in the North. Belep was also the most pro-independence commune in the 2018 and 2020 referendums. Meanwhile, Le Pen's strongest commune was Koumac, a primarily Kanak commune in the North where she received 46.51% of the vote (but still failed to retain the commune after winning it in 2017).

Communes with majority Kanak populations (mostly located in the two more remote provinces, the Loyalty Islands and the North Province) are in favour of independence, while communes with lower Kanak populations (mostly located in the more urban South Province) tend to oppose independence and instead favour autonomy within the French Republic. Communes that voted Yes to independence in the 2018 and 2020 referendums had extraordinarily low voter turnout, with the lowest being in Pouébo in the North (where just 1.99% of eligible voters cast a ballot in the second round), as well as almost universal abstinence from Loyalty Islanders. Independence supporters (especially Kanaks) also boycotted the 2021 independence referendum, leading to its almost universal rejection. However, turnout also sharply declined in anti-independence communes, with more than half of eligible voters in almost every commune in the territory abstaining from voting. In fact, the only commune where more than half of voters cast a ballot was Farino in the South, where 64.77% of voters voted in the election (by far the highest turnout in the territory, but still much lower than in 2017). A landlocked rural commune predominantly inhabited by Caldoches (descendants of White French settlers), Farino is a politically conservative and loyalist commune known for its consistently high voter turnout and overwhelmingly opposition to independence, having been the most anti-independence commune in the 2017 and 2020 referendums and voting strongly for Le Pen in 2017 (though an enormous swing saw Macron win it in 2022).

Of those that did vote, support for Macron skyrocketed in communes that voted either for Le Pen or only narrowly voted for Macron in 2020, allowing Macron to flip every single commune that voted for Le Pen in 2017 whilst simultaneously holding onto every commune he won in 2017. Macron gained significant ground in multicultural and predominantly Caldoche urban and rural areas in the South, many of which voted for Le Pen in 2017 and opposed independence in the 2018 and 2020 referendums. Le Pen did manage to gain significant ground in various Kanak-majority and pro-independence communes, which voted heavily for Macron in the second round and predominantly for La France Insoumise (LFI) nominee Jean-Luc Mélenchon in the first round. However, the small populations and extremely low turnout in these communes meant that these gains were nowhere near enough to offset the overall swing to Macron in the more populous communes, nor was it anywhere near enough to overturn Macron's huge majorities in Kanak-majority communes.

The swing to Macron was unique given the overall trend towards Le Pen in the rest of France, with New Caledonia being the only region or department in the entire country where Macron increased his vote share in the second round. It was even more unique for Overseas France, which voted primarily for Le Pen in the second round and swung heavily against Macron. The three Pacific territories (French Polynesia, New Caledonia and Wallis and Futuna) and Saint-Barthélemy were the only overseas territories that Macron won, despite winning all of them in 2017 and despite all but four of them (Mayotte and the three Pacific territories) voting for Mélenchon in the first round (with Mélenchon having endorsed against Le Pen). The swing on the right to Macron has been credited to his economic and pro-business policies as well as his loyalist stances, despite the major local centre-right to right-wing party The Rally refusing to directly endorse him.

== Aftermath ==
The low voter turnout was a major point of discussion for the election results in New Caledonia. While turnout is traditionally lower in the territory than in Metropolitan France, especially in Kanak-majority areas that continue to wish for independence from France, the turnout reached record low levels, with even most urban voters abstaining. While the desire for independence remained a reason for not voting, with separatist parties and some trade unions organising a boycott of the election, other reasons for abstention included the COVID-19 pandemic, a lack of interest, voter fatigue and a feeling of rejection after voters rejected three independence referendums, including a third referendum in 2021 which most Kanaks and independence supporters boycotted due to the pandemic (which put the fairness of the vote into dispute).
