= List of French communes by surface area =

This is a list of the largest communes in France in terms of the surface area of their municipalities.

== Largest communes in France and overseas departments and territories ==
	Commune	Department	Surface area (km²)
1	Maripasoula	Guyane	18,360
2	Régina	Guyane	12,130
3	Camopi	Guyane	10,030
4	Mana	Guyane	6,339
5	Saint-Élie	Guyane	5,680
6	Saint-Laurent-du-Maroni	Guyane	4,830
7	Saül	Guyane	4,475
8	Roura	Guyane	3,903
9	Iracoubo	Guyane	2,762
10	Papaichton	Guyane	2,628
11	Saint-Georges	Guyane	2,320
12	Kourou	Guyane	2,160
13	Grand-Santi	Guyane	2,112
14	Apatou	Guyane	2,020
15	Yaté	New Caledonia	1,356
16	Sinnamary	Guyane	1,340
17	Rémire-Montjoly	Guyane	1,181
18	Lifou	New Caledonia	1,170
19	Ouanary	Guyane	1,080
20	Thio	New Caledonia	1,007
21	Hienghène	New Caledonia	1,002
22	Houaïlou	New Caledonia	945
23	Bouloupari	New Caledonia	905
24	Poya	New Caledonia	884
25	Voh	New Caledonia	842
26	Bourail	New Caledonia	825
27	Arles	Bouches-du-Rhône	759
28	Kaala-Gomen	New Caledonia	738
29	Païta	New Caledonia	726
30	Ponérihouen	New Caledonia	708
31	Pouembout	New Caledonia	691
32	Ouégoa	New Caledonia	678
33	Poindimié	New Caledonia	675
34	Maré	New Caledonia	670
35	Le Mont-Dore	New Caledonia	649
36	Montsinéry-Tonnegrande	Guyane	600
37	Koumac	New Caledonia	563
38	Poum	New Caledonia	529
39	La Foa	New Caledonia	506
40	Canala	New Caledonia	448
41	Koné	New Caledonia	406
42	Kouaoua	New Caledonia	391
43	Nuku Hiva	French Polynesia	388
44	Macouria	Guyane	378
45	Saintes-Maries-de-la-Mer	Bouches-du-Rhône	375
46	Moindou	New Caledonia	346
47	Hiva Oa	French Polynesia	327
48	Touho	New Caledonia	290
49	Dumbéa	New Caledonia	258
50	Laruns	Pyrénées-Atlantiques	249

Source: Institut géographique national

== Largest communes in Metropolitan France ==
	Commune	Department	Surface area (km²)
1	Arles	Bouches-du-Rhône	758,93
2	Saintes-Maries-de-la-Mer	Bouches-du-Rhône	374,61
3	Laruns	Pyrénées-Atlantiques	248,96
4	Chamonix-Mont-Blanc	Haute-Savoie	245,46
5	Marseille	Bouches-du-Rhône	240,62
6	Saint-Christophe-en-Oisans	Isère	237,5
7	Saint-Martin-de-Crau	Bouches-du-Rhône	214,87
8	Lacanau	Gironde	214,02
9	Saint-Paul-sur-Ubaye	Alpes-de-Haute-Provence	205,55
10	Sartène	Corse-du-Sud	202,31
11	Carcans	Gironde	201,76
12	Biscarrosse	Landes	193,14
13	Névache	Hautes-Alpes	191,35
14	Hourtin	Gironde	190,5
15	Aix-en-Provence	Bouches-du-Rhône	186,08
16	Calenzana	Haute-Corse	185,02
17	Haguenau	Bas-Rhin	182,79
18	Bressuire	Deux-Sèvres	182,31
19	Bourg-Saint-Maurice	Savoie	182,17
20	Termignon	Savoie	180,47
21	La Teste-de-Buch	Gironde	178,61
22	Tende	Alpes-Maritimes	178,12
23	Narbonne	Aude	172,85
24	Saint-Étienne-de-Tinée	Alpes-Maritimes	173,81
25	Fontainebleau	Seine-et-Marne	172,05
26	Millau	Aveyron	168,23
27	Porto-Vecchio	Corse-du-Sud	169,93
28	Prads-Haute-Bléone	Alpes-de-Haute-Provence	167,29
29	Auzat	Ariège	163,46
30	Saint-Martin-de-Belleville	Savoie	162,91

- Paris has a surface area of 105.40 km².

== Smallest communes in France ==
	Commune	Department	Surface area (ha)
1	Castelmoron-d'Albret	Gironde	4
2	Plessix-Balisson	Côtes-d'Armor	8
3	Vaudherland	Val-d'Oise	10
4	Lannoy	Nord	16
5	Saint-Antoine	Gironde	20
6	Mallièvre	Vendée	22
7	La Ferrière-sur-Risle	Eure	25
8	Sainte-Marie	Hautes-Pyrénées	25
9	Bourg-le-Roi	Sarthe	37
10	Mont-Louis	Pyrénées-Orientales	39

== See also ==
- World's largest cities
