= Farino =

Commune of New Caledonia

- Commune
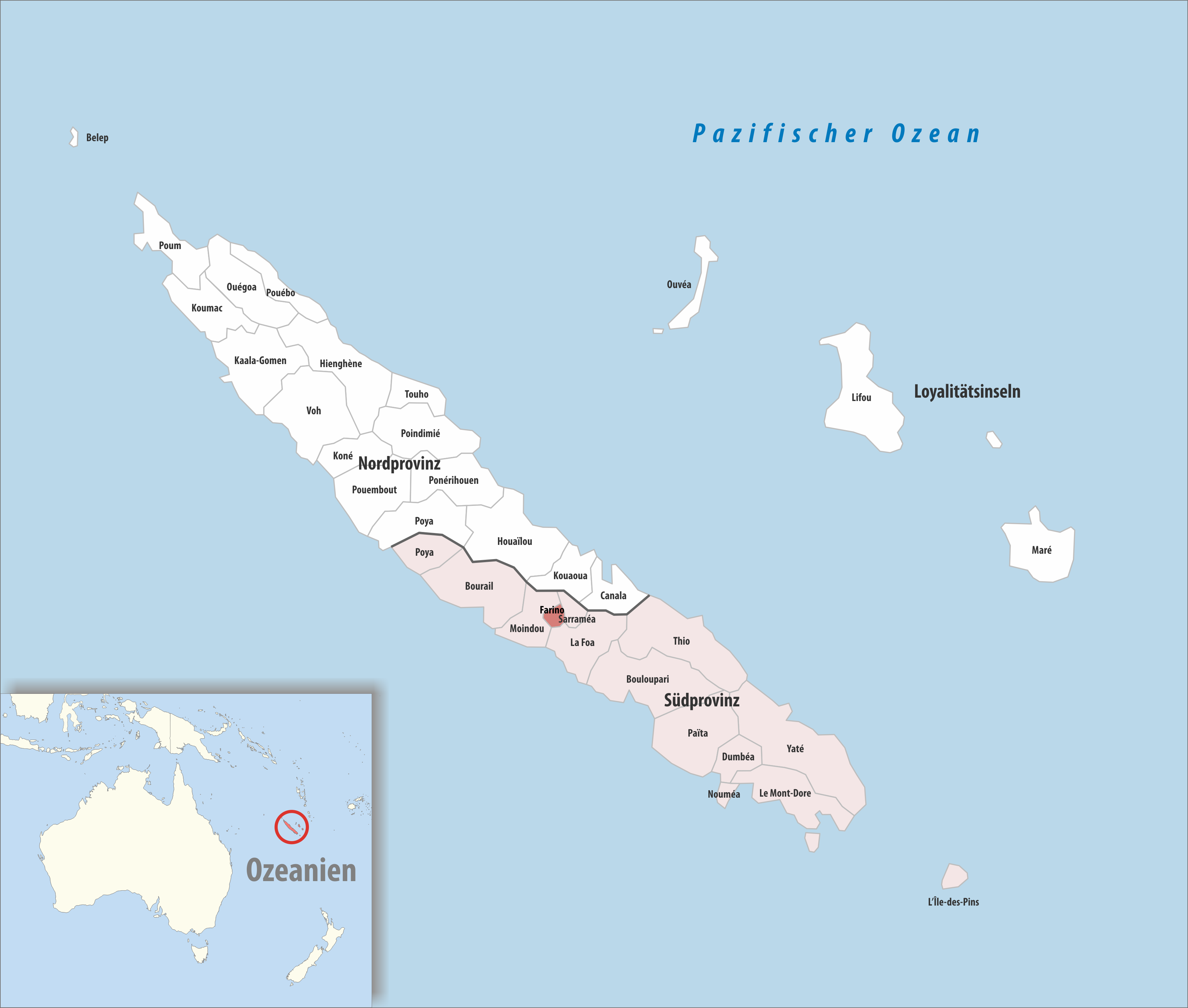
- Location of the commune (in red) within New Caledonia
- Location of Farino
- Coordinates: 21°40′06″S 165°45′55″E
- Country: France
- Sui generis collectivity: New Caledonia
- Province: South Province

Government
  - Mayor (2020–2026): Régis Roustan
- Area^{1}: 48.0 km^{2} (18.5 sq mi)
- Elevation: 250 m (820 ft)
- Highest elevation: 701 m (2,300 ft)
- Lowest elevation: 15 m (49 ft)
- Population (2019 census): 712
  - Density: 14.8/km^{2} (38.4/sq mi)

Ethnic distribution
  - 2019 census: Europeans 46.35% Kanaks 10.81% Wallisians and Futunans 4.92% Mixed 22.47% Other 15.45%
- Time zone: UTC+11:00
- INSEE/Postal code: 98806 /98880
- ^{1} New Caledonia Land Register (DITTT) data, which exclude lakes and ponds larger than 1 km² (0.386 sq mi or 247 acres) as well as the estuaries of rivers.

Farino (French: [faʁino]; Xârâcùù: Udi Pwee) is a landlocked commune in the South Province of New Caledonia, an overseas territory of France in the Pacific Ocean. Located on the main island of Grand Terre, it and neighbouring Sarraméa are the only two communes in the territory that do not border the sea.

== Politics ==
Being a landlocked, agricultural, rural and predominantly Caldoche (White French) commune, Farino is politically conservative and agrarian, being regarded as the most conservative commune in New Caledonia. It regularly votes for centre-right or right-wing candidates and parties in local and French elections. It is known for its high voter turnout and anti-independence and loyalist politics, having overwhelmingly rejected independence in the 2018 and 2020 referendums, and virtually universally doing so in the largely-boycotted 2021 referendum. In 2018 and 2020, the percentages of voters rejecting independence were 90.82% and 88.54%, respectively, on both occasions the highest percentage in any whole commune (with only Poya-Sud, the part of Poya located in the South Province, having a higher "no" percentage in both referendums). In the 1998 referendum that soundly approved the Nouméa Accord, only 55.35% of voters approved of the accord, a lower percentage than in any other commune except Koumac.
