= Grevillea nepwiensis =

Conservation status
- Vulnerable (IUCN 3.1)

Scientific classification
- Kingdom: Plantae
- Clade: Tracheophytes
- Clade: Angiosperms
- Clade: Eudicots
- Order: Proteales
- Family: Proteaceae
- Genus: Grevillea
- Species: G. nepwiensis

Binomial name
- Grevillea nepwiensis Majourau & Pillon

Species of shrub endemic to New Caledonia

Grevillea nepwiensis is a large shrub or small tree of the Proteaceae family and is endemic to the Pouembout region of New Caledonia. It grows up to a maximum of 6 metres (20 ft) tall and produces pink inflorescences. Like all other grevillea species of New Caledonia, it is a manganese accumulator.

== Description ==
Grevillea nepwiensis is a small tree or shrub, averaging 1–5 metres (3.3–16.4 ft) tall to a maximum of 6 metres (20 ft) tall. The branchlets are angular to rounded and subsericeous to pubescent.

The leaves are simple with entire margins and are broadly elliptical to obovate in shape, arranged alternately along the branchlets. The petioles are 0.7–1.2 cm (0.28–0.47 in) long, the leaves on average 1.8–3.9 cm (0.71–1.54 in) wide and 5–8.5 cm (2.0–3.3 in) long. The upper surface of the leaf is glabrous or sparsely covered in silver hairs while the underside is densely covered in ruddy-brown to silver indumentum, depending on the leaf age.

The flowers are arranged on a dense, cylindrical inflorescence with an average of between 140 and 175 individual flowers per inflorescence.

== Taxonomy ==
Grevillea nepwiensis was described as a new species in a taxonomic revision published in 2020 in the academic journal Phytotaxa after formerly being regarded as a subspecies of Grevillea gillivrayi. The specific epithet is named after the village of Nepoui (Nepwi in the local Paicî language) which is located in the central area of the species' distribution.
