= AS Poya =

- Full name: L'Association Sportive Poya
- Ground: Poya, New Caledonia
- League: New Caledonia Division Honneur
- 2007–2008: 7th
Home colours	Away colours

AS Poya is a New Caledonian football team playing at the top level. It is based in Poya.
