= Poya, New Caledonia =

Commune of New Caledonia

Poya
- Commune
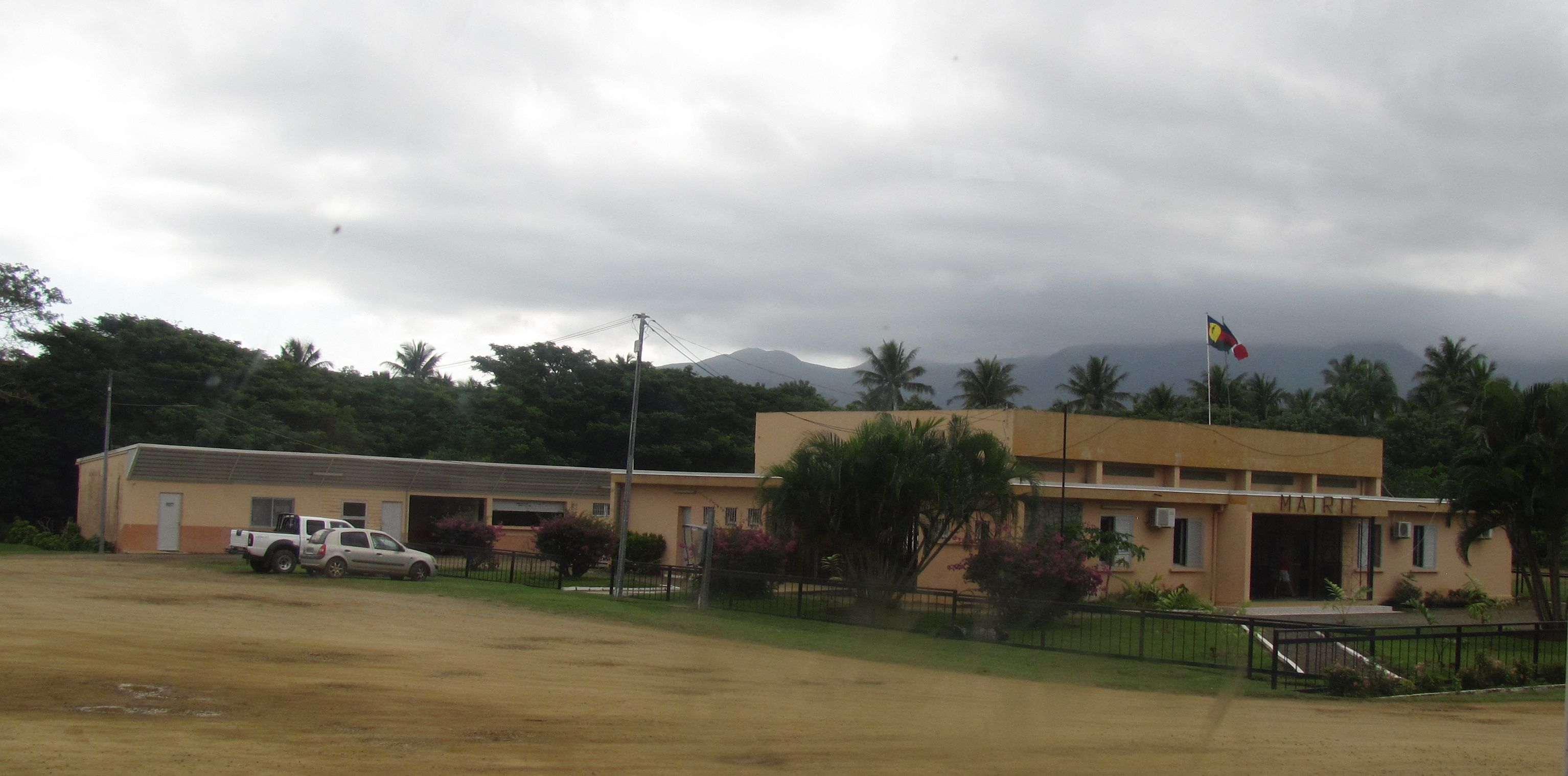
- The town hall in Poya

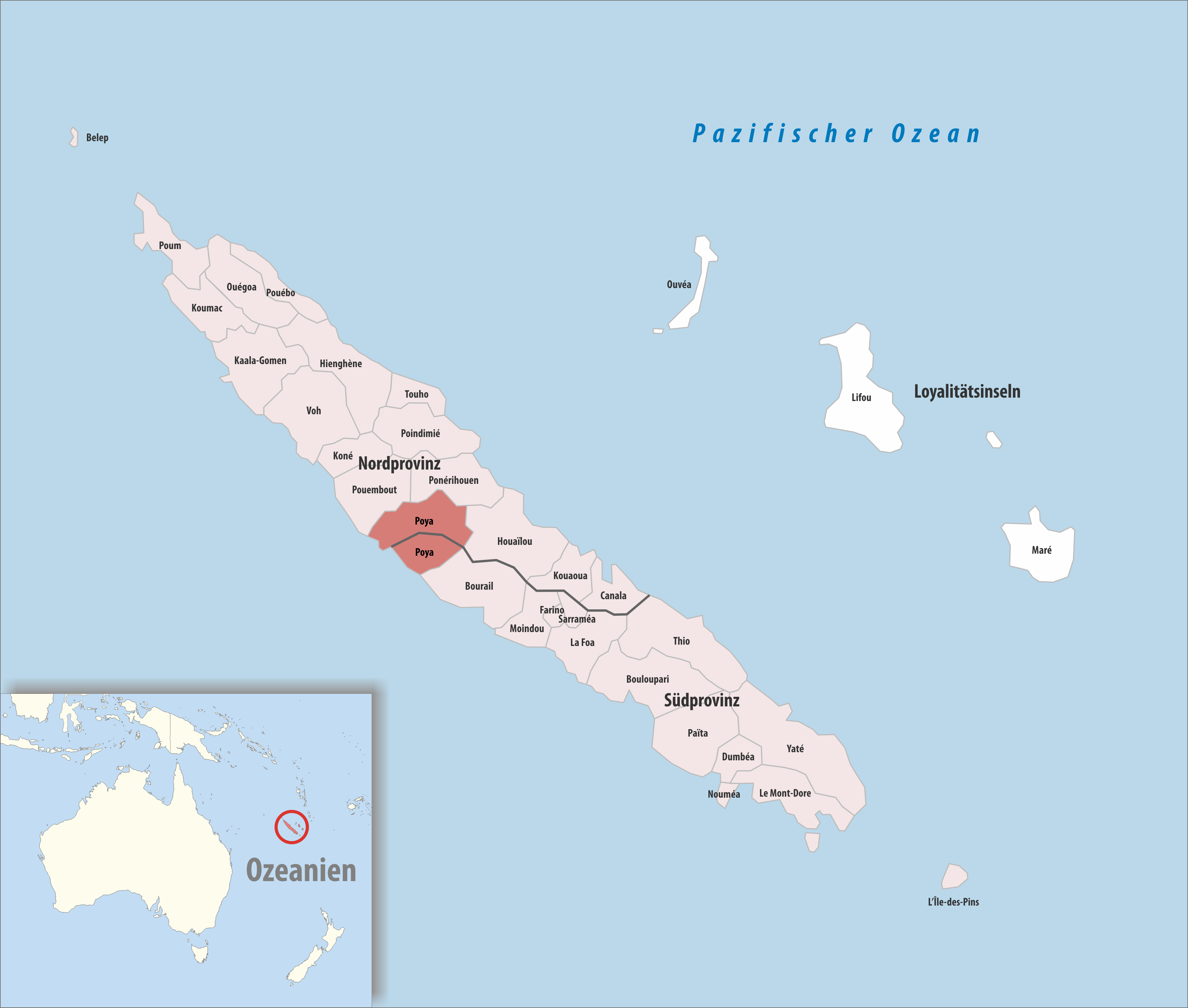
- Location of the commune (in red) within New Caledonia
- Location of Poya
- Coordinates: 21°20′55″S 165°09′04″E
- Country: France
- Sui generis collectivity: New Caledonia
- Province: North Province and South Province

Government
  - Mayor (2020–2026): Évelyne Goro-Atu
- Area^{1}: 845.8 km^{2} (326.6 sq mi)
- Elevation: 20 m (66 ft)
- Highest elevation: 1,508 m (4,948 ft)
- Lowest elevation: 0 m (0 ft)
- Population (2019 census): 2,802
  - Density: 3.313/km^{2} (8.580/sq mi)

Ethnic distribution
  - 2019 census: Kanaks 58.85% Europeans 13.95% Wallisians and Futunans 5.03% Mixed 13.67% Other 8.49%
- Time zone: UTC+11:00
- INSEE/Postal code: 98827 /98827
- ^{1} New Caledonia Land Register (DITTT) data, which exclude lakes and ponds larger than 1 km² (0.386 sq mi or 247 acres) as well as the estuaries of rivers.

Poya (French: [pɔja], Paicî: Nèkö) is a commune in New Caledonia, an overseas territory of France in the Pacific Ocean. The largest part of the commune (including the main settlement of Poya itself), known as Poya-Nord, lies in the North Province of New Caledonia, and a smaller part of the commune, known as Poya-Sud, lies in the South Province, an odd situation resulting from the creation of New Caledonia's provinces in 1989. At the 2019 census, 2,592 of the 2,802 inhabitants of Poya lived on the North Province's side of the commune, while only 210 inhabitants lived on the South Province's side.

== Climate ==
Poya has a tropical savanna climate (Köppen climate classification Aw). The average annual temperature in Poya is 23.8 °C (74.8 °F). The average annual rainfall is 1,050.0 mm (41.34 in) with March as the wettest month. The temperatures are highest on average in February, at around 27.3 °C (81.1 °F), and lowest in July, at around 20.0 °C (68.0 °F). The highest temperature ever recorded in Poya was 38.8 °C (101.8 °F) on 19 November 1968; the coldest temperature ever recorded was 6.1 °C (43.0 °F) on 24 May 1957.

Climate data for Poya (1991−2020 normals, extremes 1955−present)
Month	Jan	Feb	Mar	Apr	May	Jun	Jul	Aug	Sep	Oct	Nov	Dec	Year
Record high °C (°F)	38.0 (100.4)	37.6 (99.7)	37.1 (98.8)	35.0 (95.0)	33.6 (92.5)	32.0 (89.6)	31.0 (87.8)	32.0 (89.6)	33.9 (93.0)	36.2 (97.2)	38.8 (101.8)	38.1 (100.6)	38.8 (101.8)
Mean daily maximum °C (°F)	31.6 (88.9)	31.7 (89.1)	30.8 (87.4)	29.6 (85.3)	27.6 (81.7)	26.0 (78.8)	25.2 (77.4)	25.4 (77.7)	27.0 (80.6)	28.7 (83.7)	30.0 (86.0)	31.2 (88.2)	28.7 (83.7)
Daily mean °C (°F)	26.9 (80.4)	27.3 (81.1)	26.6 (79.9)	25.1 (77.2)	22.8 (73.0)	21.3 (70.3)	20.0 (68.0)	20.1 (68.2)	21.4 (70.5)	23.3 (73.9)	24.7 (76.5)	26.3 (79.3)	23.8 (74.8)
Mean daily minimum °C (°F)	22.3 (72.1)	23.0 (73.4)	22.5 (72.5)	20.6 (69.1)	17.9 (64.2)	16.5 (61.7)	14.9 (58.8)	14.8 (58.6)	15.7 (60.3)	17.8 (64.0)	19.5 (67.1)	21.5 (70.7)	18.9 (66.0)
Record low °C (°F)	14.9 (58.8)	14.0 (57.2)	14.0 (57.2)	11.0 (51.8)	6.1 (43.0)	6.2 (43.2)	7.0 (44.6)	7.2 (45.0)	6.7 (44.1)	8.2 (46.8)	9.6 (49.3)	12.0 (53.6)	6.1 (43.0)
Average precipitation mm (inches)	141.4 (5.57)	163.5 (6.44)	187.7 (7.39)	93.9 (3.70)	68.9 (2.71)	67.9 (2.67)	52.5 (2.07)	57.9 (2.28)	30.9 (1.22)	35.4 (1.39)	53.2 (2.09)	96.8 (3.81)	1,050 (41.34)
Average precipitation days (≥ 1.0 mm)	10.0	11.6	12.0	7.0	7.0	6.3	5.4	5.6	3.4	3.7	5.3	8.2	85.5
Source: Météo-France

== See also ==
- AS Poya
