= Kouaoua =

Commune of New Caledonia

- Commune
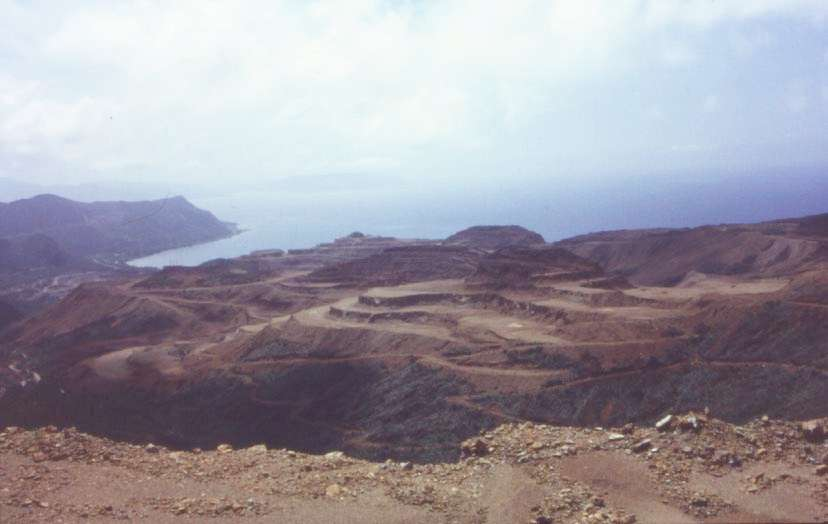
- Kouaoua opencast mine

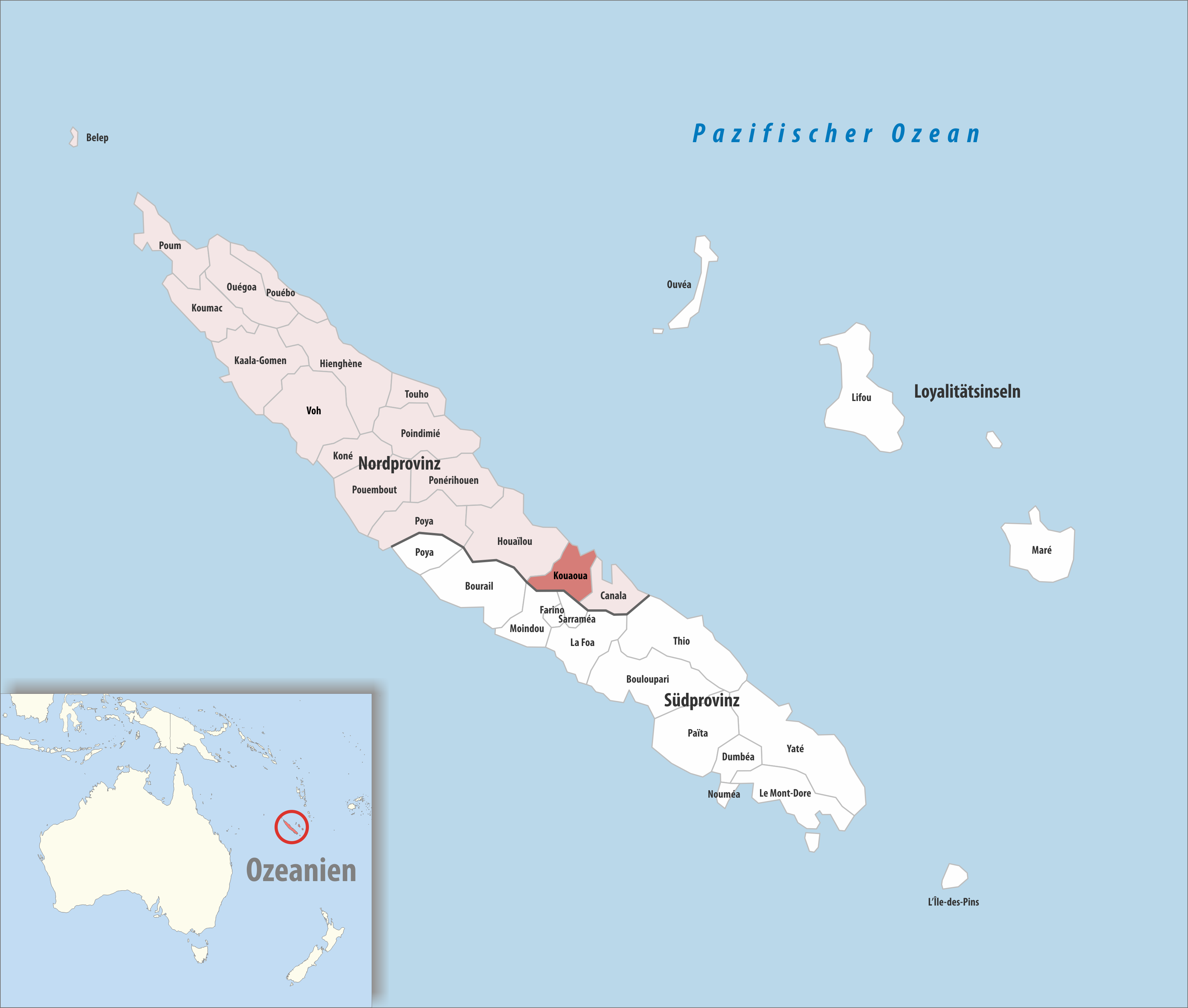
- Location of the commune (in red) within New Caledonia
- Location of Kouaoua
- Coordinates: 21°23′53″S 165°49′05″E
- Country: France
- Sui generis collectivity: New Caledonia
- Province: North Province

Government
  - Mayor (2025–2026): Patrick Hari
- Area^{1}: 383.0 km^{2} (147.9 sq mi)
- Elevation: 5 m (16 ft)
- Highest elevation: 1,058 m (3,471 ft)
- Lowest elevation: 0 m (0 ft)
- Population (2019 census): 1,304
  - Density: 3.405/km^{2} (8.818/sq mi)

Ethnic distribution
  - 2019 census: Kanaks 89.34% Europeans 2.07% Wallisians and Futunans 0.38% Mixed 4.91% Other 3.3%
- Time zone: UTC+11:00
- INSEE/Postal code: 98833 /98818
- ^{1} New Caledonia Land Register (DITTT) data, which exclude lakes and ponds larger than 1 km² (0.386 sq mi or 247 acres) as well as the estuaries of rivers.

Kouaoua (French: [kwawa], Ajië: Kaa Wi Paa) is a commune in the North Province of New Caledonia, an overseas territory of France in the Pacific Ocean. Nickel mining is operated in Kouaoua.

== History ==
The commune of Kouaoua was created on 25 April 1995 by detaching its territory from the commune of Canala.
