= Thio, New Caledonia =

Commune of New Caledonia

Thio
- Commune
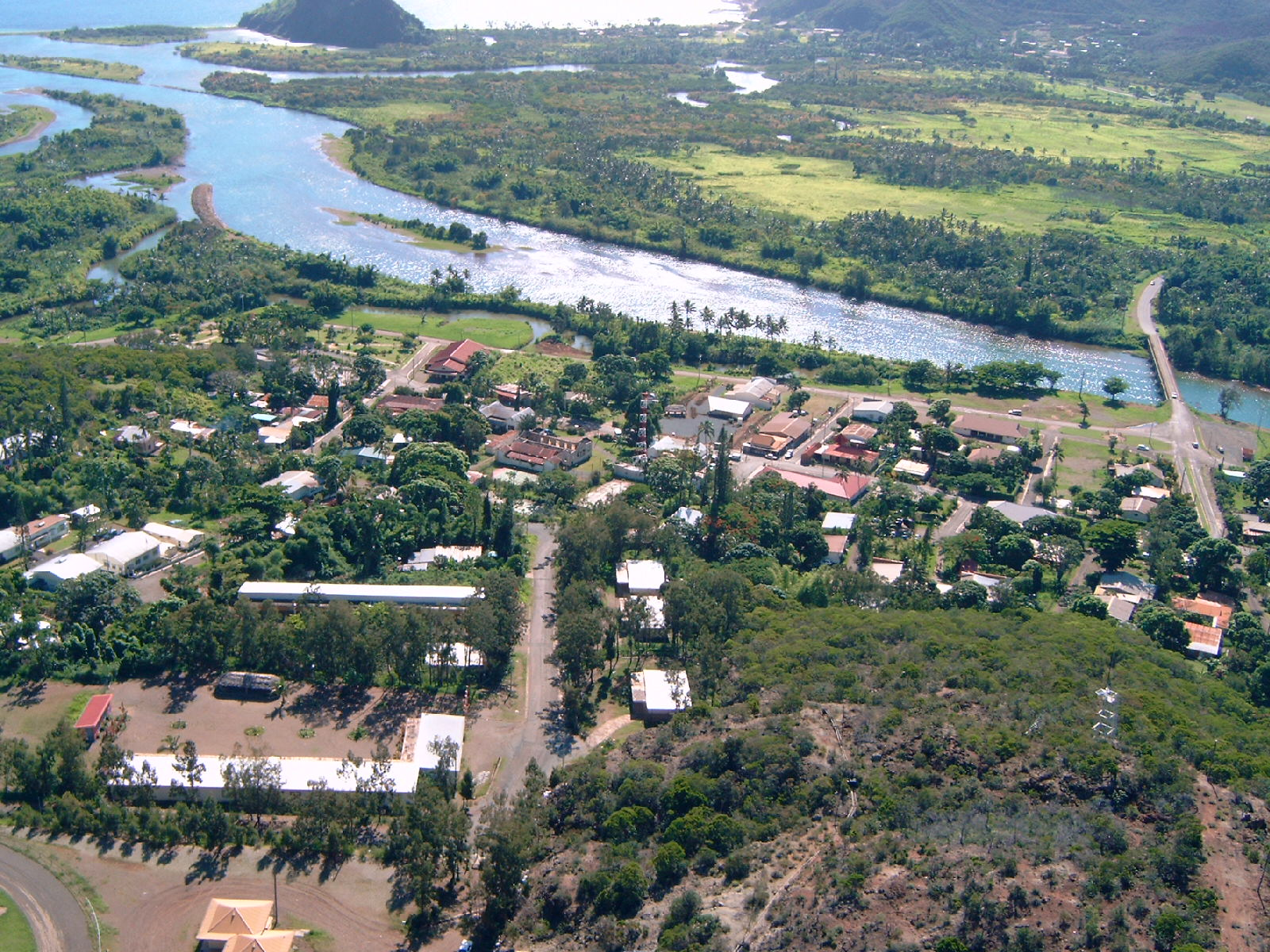
- An aerial view of the village of Thio

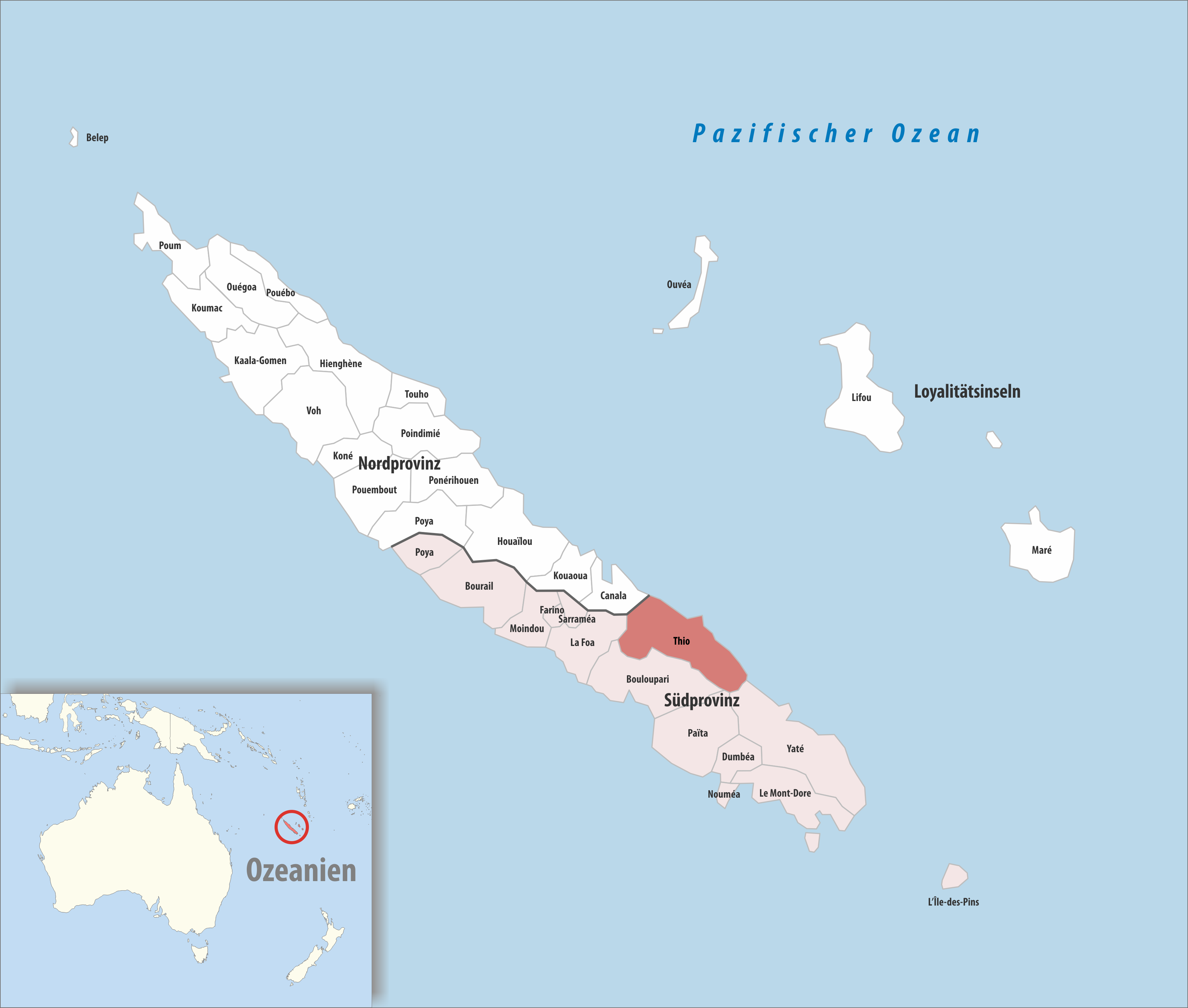
- Location of the commune (in red) within New Caledonia
- Location of Thio
- Coordinates: 21°37′S 166°13′E
- Country: France
- Sui generis collectivity: New Caledonia
- Province: South Province

Government
  - Mayor (2020–2026): Jean-Patrick Toura
- Area^{1}: 997.6 km^{2} (385.2 sq mi)
- Elevation: 10 m (33 ft)
- Highest elevation: 1,618 m (5,308 ft)
- Lowest elevation: 0 m (0 ft)
- Population (2019 census): 2,524
  - Density: 2.530/km^{2} (6.553/sq mi)

Ethnic distribution
  - 2019 census: Kanaks 76.58% Europeans 3.8% Wallisians and Futunans 3.45% Mixed 10.14% Other 6.02%
- Time zone: UTC+11:00
- INSEE/Postal code: 98829 /98829
- ^{1} New Caledonia Land Register (DITTT) data, which exclude lakes and ponds larger than 1 km² (0.386 sq mi or 247 acres) as well as the estuaries of rivers.

Thio (French: [tjo], Xârâcùù and Xârâgurè: Cöö) is a commune in the South Province of New Caledonia, an overseas territory of France in the Pacific Ocean.

A novel Aerial tramway built by Adolf Bleichert & Co. company in 1906 existed here at the start of the 20th century to facilitate loading ore ships offshore.

== 2024 New Caledonia unrest ==
During the 2024 New Caledonia unrest, an alleged gunman was shot dead by French police in the village.
