= Boulouparis =

Commune of New Caledonia

- Commune
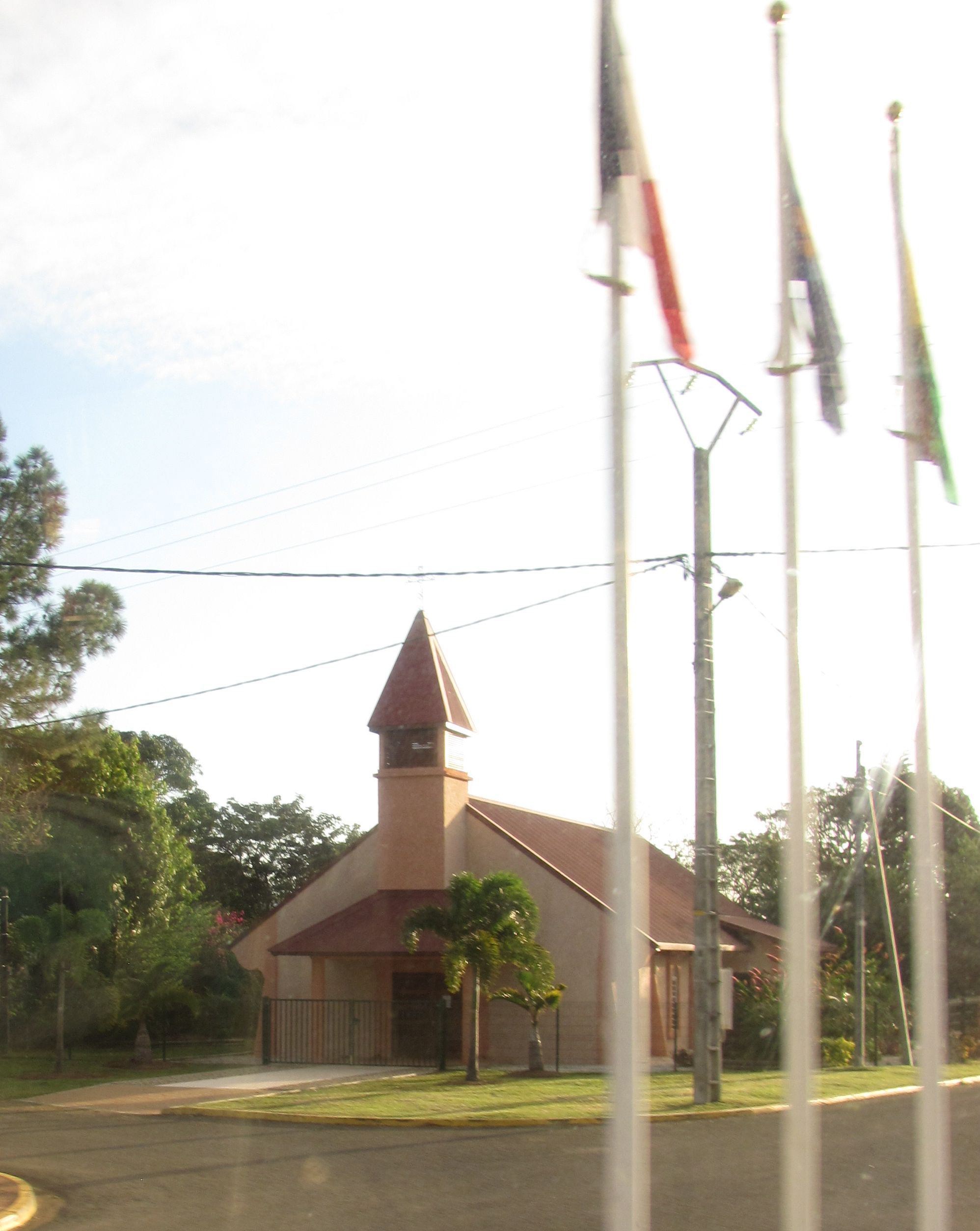
- The church of Bouloupari

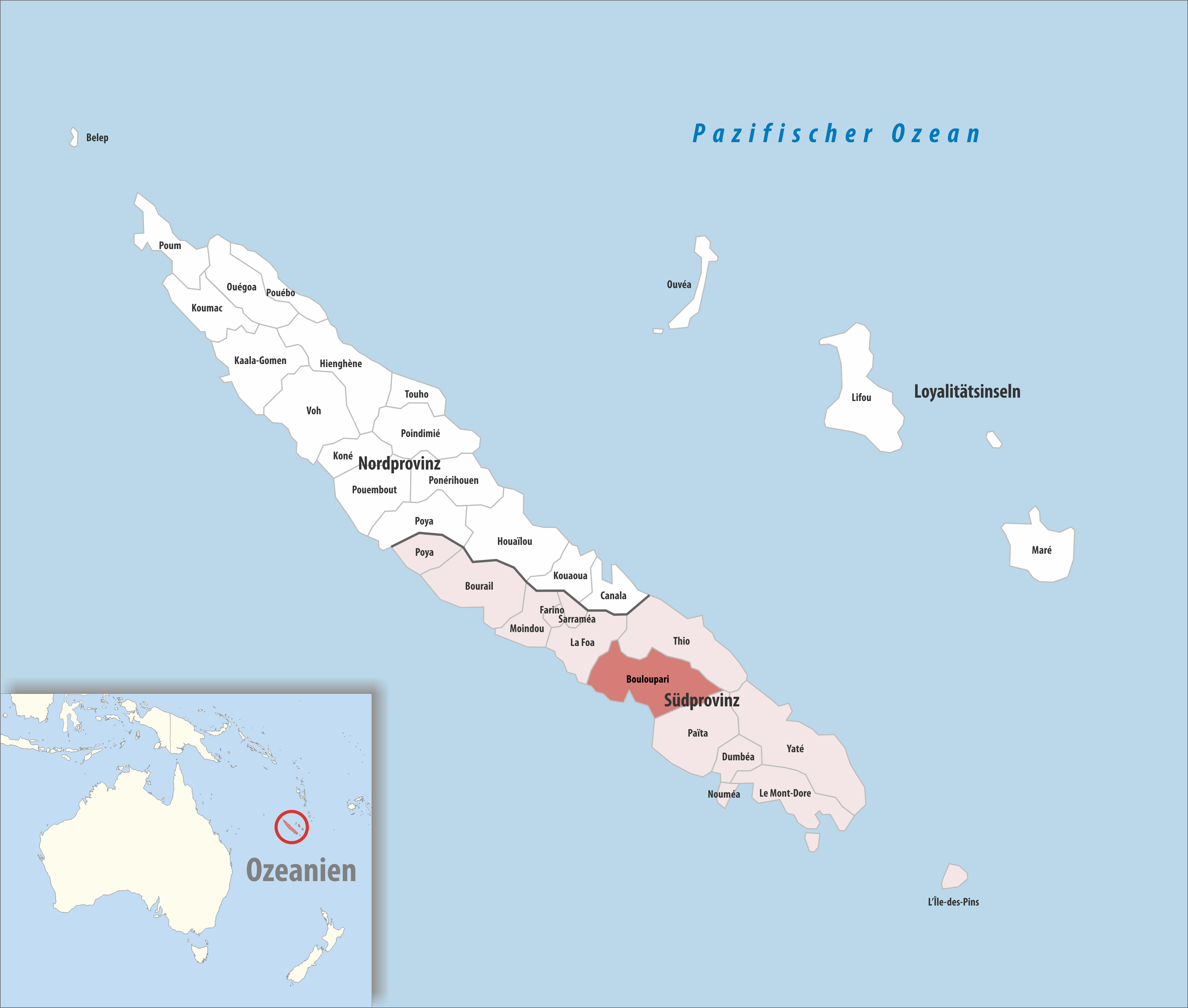
- Location of the commune (in red) within New Caledonia
- Location of Boulouparis
- Location within France
- Coordinates: 21°52′02″S 166°02′39″E
- Country: France
- Sui generis collectivity: New Caledonia
- Province: South Province

Government
  - Mayor (2020–2026): Pascal Vittori
- Area^{1}: 865.6 km^{2} (334.2 sq mi)
- Elevation: 20 m (66 ft)
- Highest elevation: 1,441 m (4,728 ft)
- Lowest elevation: 0 m (0 ft)
- Population (2019 census): 3,315
  - Density: 3.830/km^{2} (9.919/sq mi)

Ethnic distribution
  - 2019 census: Kanaks 30.17% Europeans 27.66% Wallisians and Futunans 2.23% Mixed 16.08% Other 23.86%
- Time zone: UTC+11:00
- INSEE/Postal code: 98802 /98812
- ^{1} New Caledonia Land Register (DITTT) data, which exclude lakes and ponds larger than 1 km² (0.386 sq mi or 247 acres) as well as the estuaries of rivers.

Boulouparis (French: [bulupaʁi]; Xârâcùù: Berepwari) is a commune in the South Province of New Caledonia, an overseas territory of France in the Pacific Ocean.

== Geography ==
=== Climate ===
Boulouparis has a hot semi-arid climate (Köppen BSh), though closely bordering on the tropical savanna climate (Aw) more typical of the west coast of Grande Terre. The average annual temperature in Boulouparis is 24.3 °C (75.7 °F). The average annual rainfall is 694.0 mm (27.32 in) with March as the wettest month. The temperatures are highest on average in February, at around 27.7 °C (81.9 °F), and lowest in July, at around 20.9 °C (69.6 °F). The highest temperature ever recorded in Boulouparis was 39.1 °C (102.4 °F) on 8 January 2002; the coldest temperature ever recorded was 11.7 °C (53.1 °F) on 12 August 2015.

Climate data for Boulouparis (Bouraké, 1991−2020 normals, extremes 2000−present)
| Month | Jan | Feb | Mar | Apr | May | Jun | Jul | Aug | Sep | Oct | Nov | Dec | Year |
|---|---|---|---|---|---|---|---|---|---|---|---|---|---|
| Record high °C (°F) | 39.1 (102.4) | 38.7 (101.7) | 37.4 (99.3) | 34.3 (93.7) | 32.9 (91.2) | 32.2 (90.0) | 32.8 (91.0) | 31.3 (88.3) | 33.9 (93.0) | 34.9 (94.8) | 37.4 (99.3) | 38.2 (100.8) | 39.1 (102.4) |
| Mean daily maximum °C (°F) | 31.7 (89.1) | 31.9 (89.4) | 30.8 (87.4) | 29.1 (84.4) | 27.2 (81.0) | 25.8 (78.4) | 24.9 (76.8) | 25.4 (77.7) | 27.1 (80.8) | 28.8 (83.8) | 30.0 (86.0) | 31.4 (88.5) | 28.7 (83.7) |
| Daily mean °C (°F) | 27.4 (81.3) | 27.7 (81.9) | 26.8 (80.2) | 25.2 (77.4) | 23.2 (73.8) | 21.8 (71.2) | 20.7 (69.3) | 20.9 (69.6) | 22.2 (72.0) | 23.9 (75.0) | 25.2 (77.4) | 26.9 (80.4) | 24.3 (75.7) |
| Mean daily minimum °C (°F) | 23.0 (73.4) | 23.5 (74.3) | 22.9 (73.2) | 21.4 (70.5) | 19.2 (66.6) | 17.8 (64.0) | 16.4 (61.5) | 16.4 (61.5) | 17.1 (62.8) | 19.1 (66.4) | 20.5 (68.9) | 22.3 (72.1) | 20.0 (68.0) |
| Record low °C (°F) | 18.7 (65.7) | 18.4 (65.1) | 17.8 (64.0) | 16.5 (61.7) | 13.4 (56.1) | 12.1 (53.8) | 11.9 (53.4) | 11.7 (53.1) | 12.8 (55.0) | 13.9 (57.0) | 15.8 (60.4) | 17.7 (63.9) | 11.7 (53.1) |
| Average precipitation mm (inches) | 92.8 (3.65) | 77.4 (3.05) | 101.3 (3.99) | 63.9 (2.52) | 54.5 (2.15) | 52.1 (2.05) | 48.4 (1.91) | 56.4 (2.22) | 24.8 (0.98) | 22.9 (0.90) | 35.1 (1.38) | 64.4 (2.54) | 694.0 (27.32) |
| Average precipitation days (≥ 1.0 mm) | 6.4 | 7.8 | 8.7 | 5.5 | 6.9 | 5.7 | 5.7 | 5.4 | 2.8 | 2.8 | 3.4 | 5.2 | 66.2 |
Source: Météo-France

== Twin towns – sister cities ==
Boulouparis is twinned with:

- Biloela, Australia
- Huahine, French Polynesia
