= Canala =

Commune of New Caledonia

- Commune
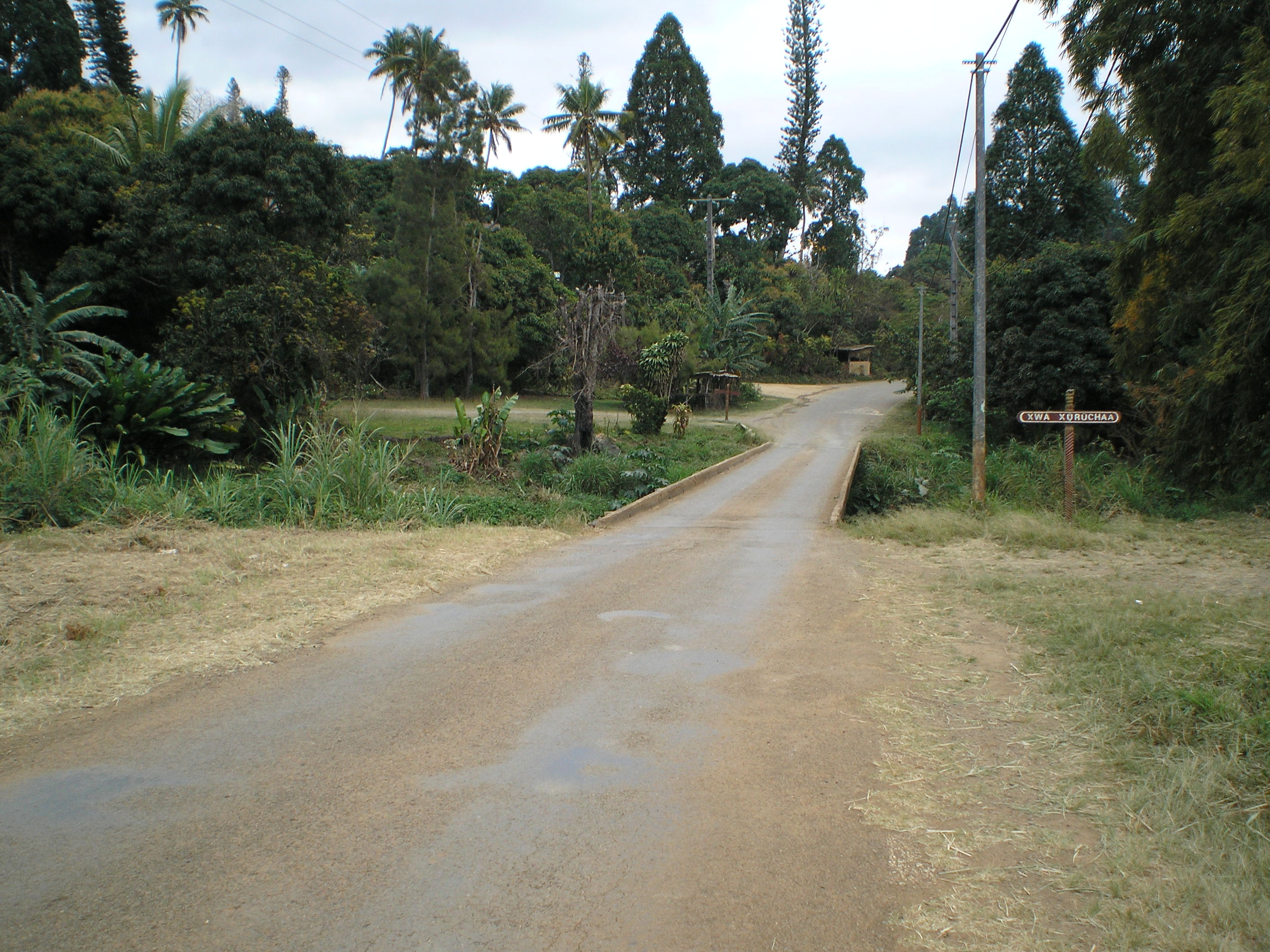
- The bridge of Gélima, in Canala

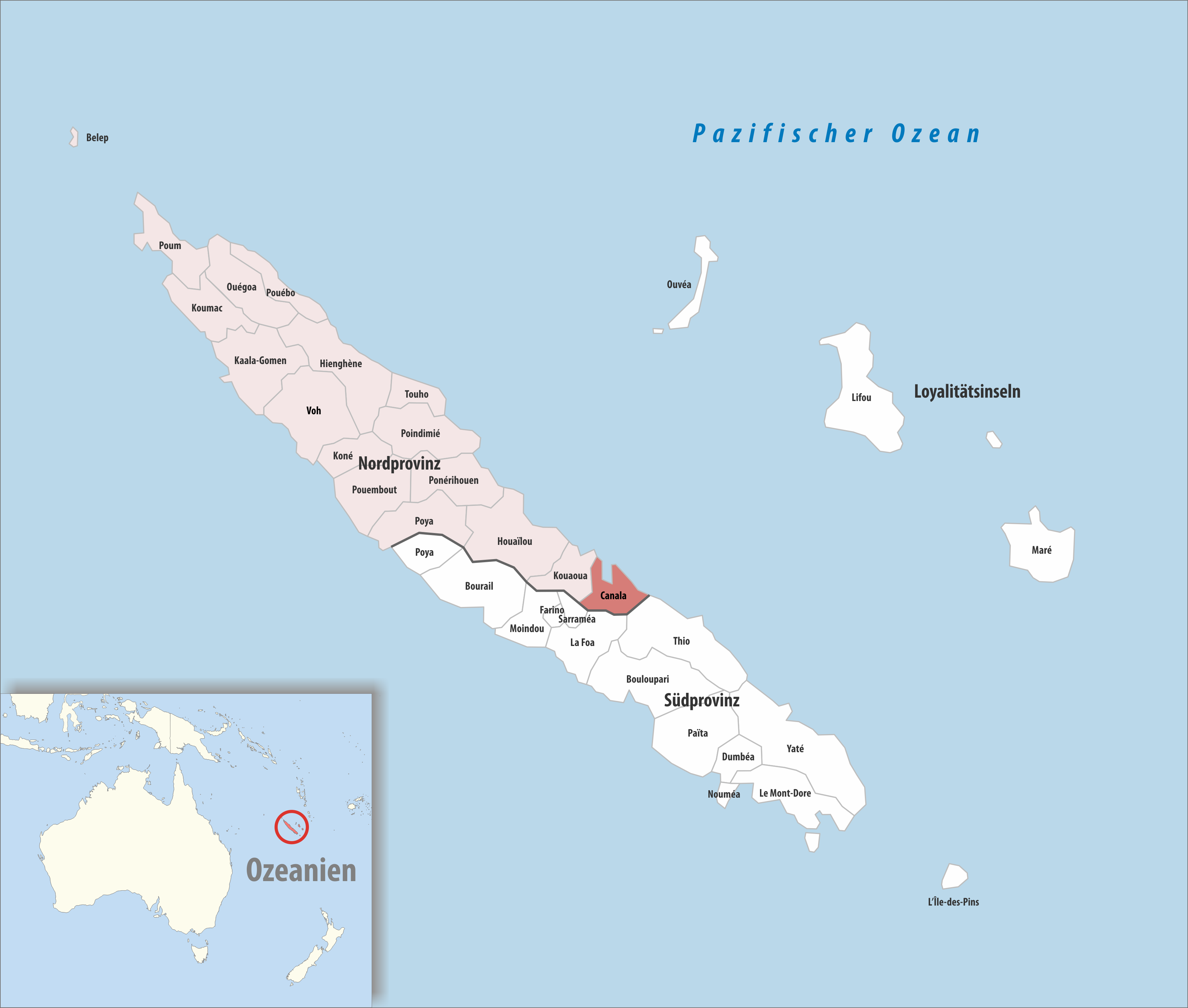
- Location of the commune (in red) within New Caledonia
- Location of Canala
- Location within France
- Coordinates: 21°31′13″S 165°57′11″E
- Country: France
- Sui generis collectivity: New Caledonia
- Province: North Province

Government
  - Mayor (2020–2026): Gilbert Tyuienon
- Area^{1}: 438.7 km^{2} (169.4 sq mi)
- Elevation: 20 m (66 ft)
- Highest elevation: 1,098 m (3,602 ft)
- Lowest elevation: 0 m (0 ft)
- Population (2019 census): 3,701
  - Density: 8.436/km^{2} (21.85/sq mi)

Ethnic distribution
  - 2019 census: Kanaks 95.24% Europeans 0.84% Wallisians and Futunans 0.14% Mixed 2.62% Other 1.16%
- Time zone: UTC+11:00
- INSEE/Postal code: 98804 /98813
- ^{1} New Caledonia Land Register (DITTT) data, which exclude lakes and ponds larger than 1 km² (0.386 sq mi or 247 acres) as well as the estuaries of rivers.

Canala (French: [kanala]; Xârâcùù: Xârâcùù) is a commune in the North Province of New Caledonia, an overseas territory of France in the Pacific Ocean.

== History ==
On 25 April 1995 about 47% of the territory of Canala was detached and became the commune of Kouaoua.
