= Hienghène =

Commune of New Caledonia

- Commune
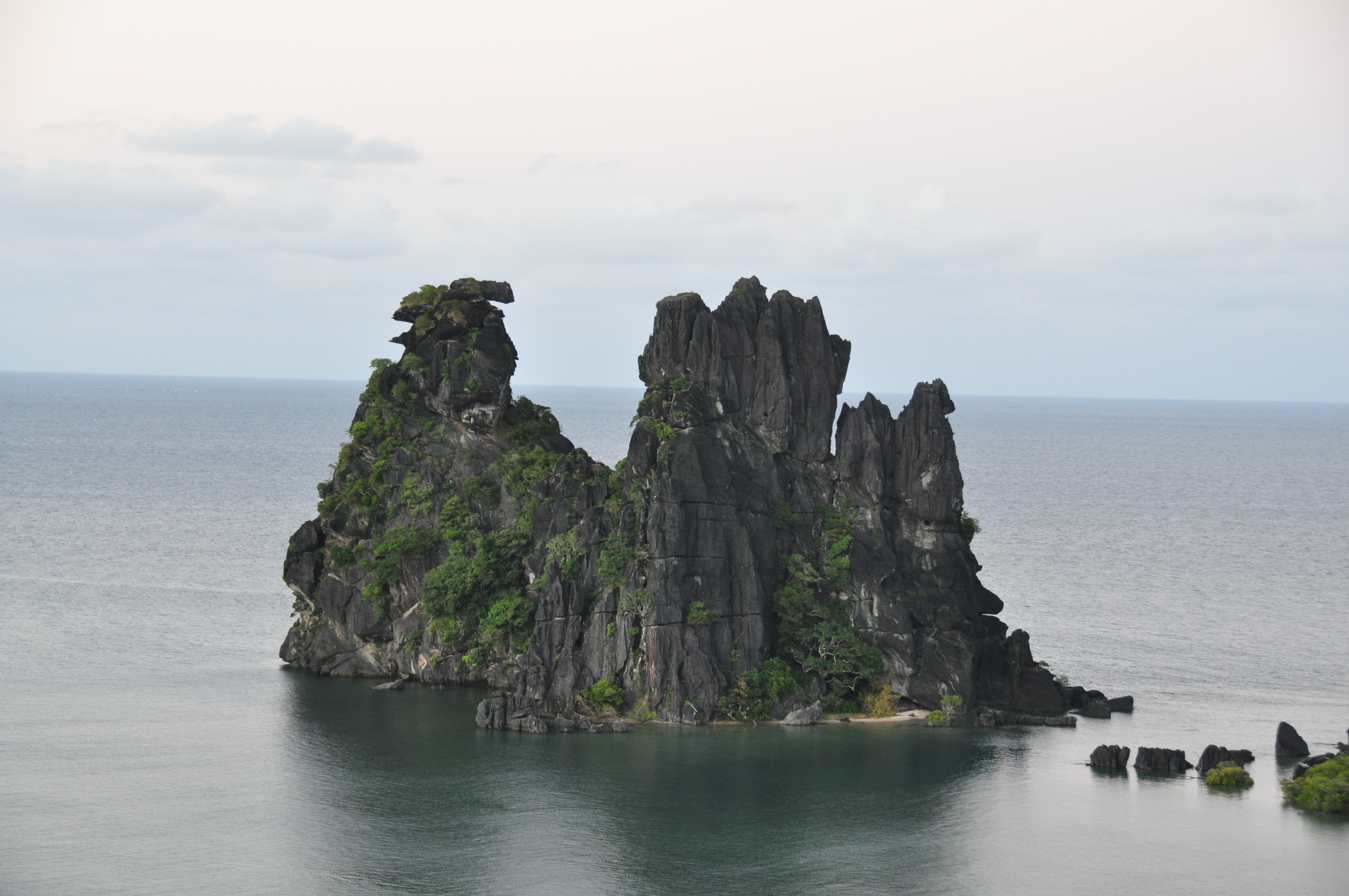
- "La Poule" (the hen) cliff in Hienghène

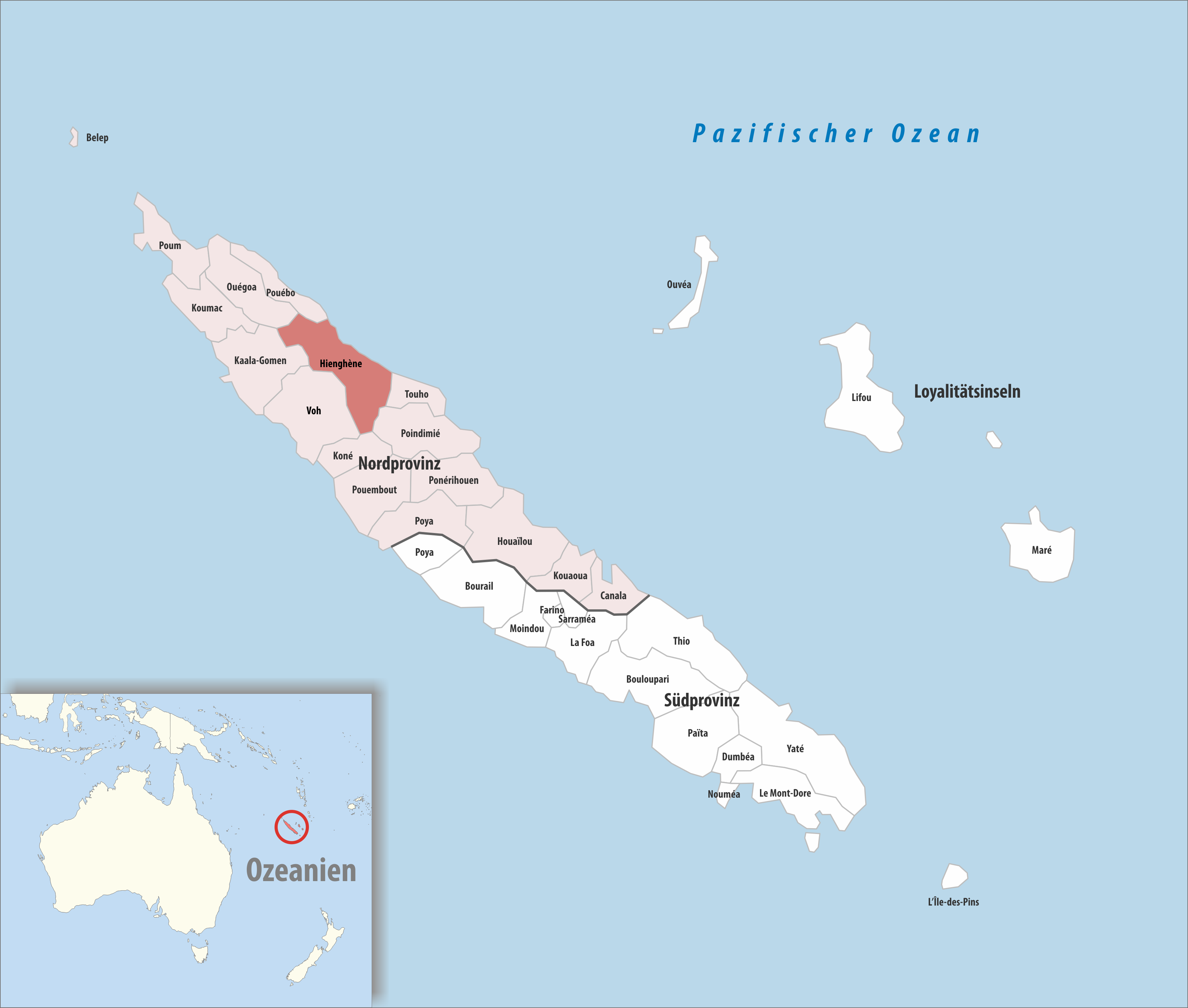
- Location of the commune (in red) within New Caledonia
- Location of Hienghène
- Coordinates: 20°41′39″S 164°55′20″E
- Country: France
- Sui generis collectivity: New Caledonia
- Province: North Province

Government
  - Mayor (2020–2026): Bernard Ouillatte
- Area^{1}: 1,068.8 km^{2} (412.7 sq mi)
- Elevation: 20 m (66 ft)
- Highest elevation: 1,628 m (5,341 ft)
- Lowest elevation: 0 m (0 ft)
- Population (2019 census): 2,454
  - Density: 2.296/km^{2} (5.947/sq mi)

Ethnic distribution
  - 2019 census: Kanaks 94.17% Europeans 2.36% Wallisians and Futunans 0.12% Mixed 2.61% Other 0.73%
- Time zone: UTC+11:00
- INSEE/Postal code: 98807 /98815
- ^{1} New Caledonia Land Register (DITTT) data, which exclude lakes and ponds larger than 1 km² (0.386 sq mi or 247 acres) as well as the estuaries of rivers.

Hienghène (French pronunciation: [jɛ̃ɡɛn],; Fwâi: Hyehen) is a commune in the North Province of New Caledonia, an overseas territory of France in the Pacific Ocean. It is located on a bay called Hienghène Bay, known for its eroded limestone islets.

The islets are remnants of a limestone and silica formation that once covered the whole of the bay, some 40 million years ago. Erosion from wind and water carved away the softer limestone, leaving the harder silica behind in eye-catching formations. Several of these formations have been given fanciful names, such as the Sphinx, the Towers of Notre Dame, and the Hen (pictured).

The commune is home to New Caledonia Super Ligue football club Hienghène Sport.
