= Administrative divisions of New Caledonia =

The French sui generis collectivity of New Caledonia is divided into three provinces, which in turn are divided into 33 communes. There is also a system of eight tribal areas for the indigenous Kanak people, and three decentralized subdivisions.

== Provinces ==
New Caledonia is divided into three provinces. The North and South Provinces are located on the New Caledonian mainland, while the Loyalty Islands Province is a series of islands off the mainland.

Province name (name in French)	Capital city	Population (2019)
Loyalty Islands Province (Province des îles Loyauté)	Lifou	18,353
North Province (Province Nord)	Koné	49,910
South Province (Province Sud)	Nouméa	203,144

Each province has its own flag and emblem and has considerable powers, including all powers that are not explicitly the prerogative of either the territorial Congress of New Caledonia in Nouméa or parliament of the French Republic in Paris. The borders and powers of the provinces were outlined in 1988 as part of the Matignon Accords.

The Loyalty Islands Province has its seat at Wé in the commune of Lifou, and the provincial seat of the North Province is at Koné (although physically located closer to the town of Pouembout). The South Province has its provincial seat at Nouméa, although La Foa also serves as the seat of some administrations (see subdivisions section below).

== Communes ==
New Caledonia is subdivided into 33 communes (municipalities), which in most cases predate the provinces. One commune, Poya, was divided between the two mainland provinces as part of the Matignon Accords. On the list below, communal seats are shown in parentheses if different from the commune name.

Key
South Province
North Province
Loyalty Islands Province
part of both provinces
provincial capital
capital of New Caledonia

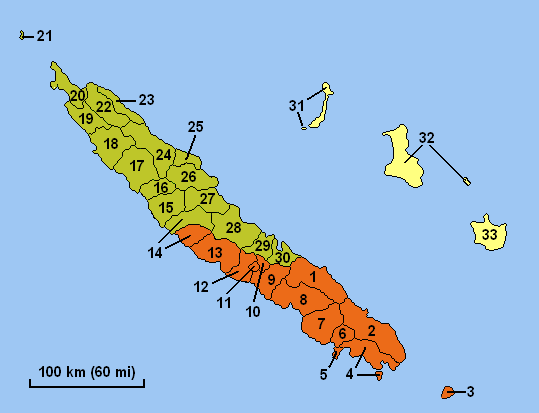
Administrative divisions of New Caledonia: North Province South Province Loyalty Islands Province. The numbers correspond to the list of communes to the left.

No. on Map	Commune	Population (2019)
1	Thio	2,524
2	Yaté	1,667
3	Isle of Pines	2,037
4	Le Mont-Dore	27,620
5	Nouméa	94,285
6	Dumbéa	35,873
7	Païta	24,563
8	Boulouparis	3,315
9	La Foa	3,552
10	Sarraméa	572
11	Farino	712
12	Moindou	681
13	Bourail	5,531
14	Poya	2,802
15	Pouembout	2,752
16	Koné	8,144
17	Voh	2,856
18	Kaala-Gomen	1,803
19	Koumac	3,981
20	Poum	1,435
21	Belep	867
22	Ouégoa	2,118
23	Pouébo	2,144
24	Hienghène	2,454
25	Touho	2,380
26	Poindimié	5,006
27	Ponérihouen	2,420
28	Houaïlou	3,955
29	Kouaoua	1,304
30	Canala	3,701
31	Ouvéa	3,401
32	Lifou	9,195
33	Maré	5,757

== Other types of divisions ==
The hierarchy of New Caledonia's administrative subdivisions, shown in a triangle.

=== Tribal areas (aires coutumières) ===
In addition, a parallel layer of administration exists for Kanak tribal affairs; these are called aires coutumières ("tribal areas") and are eight in number. Their jurisdiction does not encompass non-Kanaks living within these zones. The tribal areas more or less correspond to the indigenous language areas and/or areas of pre-French tribal alliances.

=== Subdivisions ===
There are also three subdivisions, simply known as subdivisions in French, with the same names and boundaries as the three provinces, except that the commune of Poya is entirely within the North Subdivision. Unlike the provinces, which are full political divisions with their own assemblies and executives, the subdivisions are merely decentralized divisions of the French central state, akin to the arrondissements of Metropolitan France, with a Deputy Commissioner of the Republic (commissaire délégué de la République), akin to a subprefect of Metropolitan France, in residence in each subdivision's chief town.

The subdivision chief towns are the same as the provincial capitals except in the South Subdivision where the chief town is La Foa, whereas the capital of the South Province is Nouméa. Thus, although the provincial assembly of the South Province sits in Nouméa, the South Subdivision's Deputy Commissioner of the Republic is in residence in La Foa. This was decided in order to counterbalance the overwhelming weight of Nouméa in New Caledonia.

== See also ==
- Administrative divisions of France
- Lists of communes of France
- Politics of New Caledonia
