= Ponérihouen =

Commune of New Caledonia

- Commune
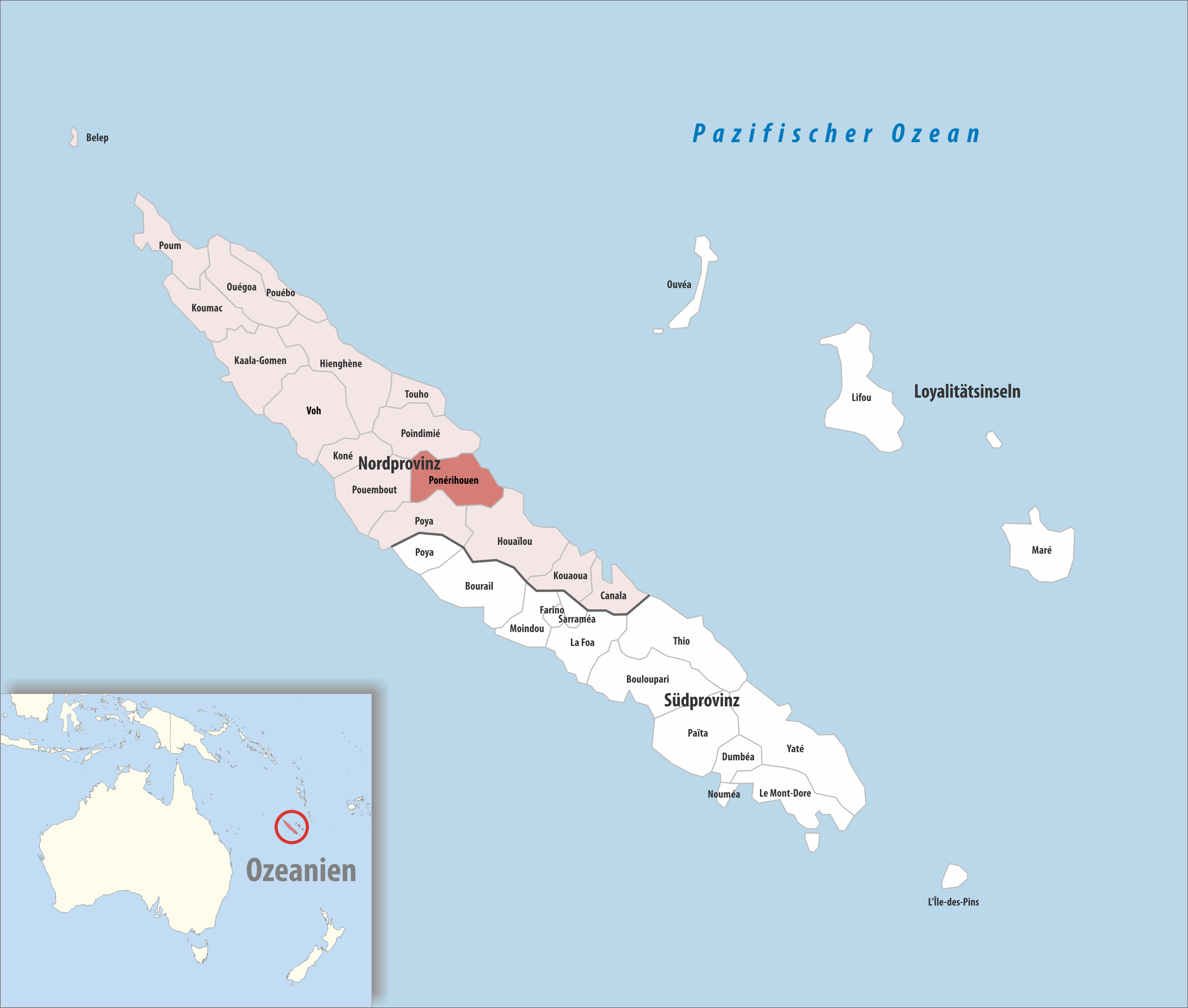
- Location of the commune (in red) within New Caledonia
- Location of Ponérihouen
- Coordinates: 21°04′38″S 165°23′46″E
- Country: France
- Sui generis collectivity: New Caledonia
- Province: North Province

Government
  - Mayor (2020–2026): Pierre Chanel Tutugoro
- Area^{1}: 707.3 km^{2} (273.1 sq mi)
- Elevation: 10 m (33 ft)
- Highest elevation: 1,330 m (4,360 ft)
- Lowest elevation: 0 m (0 ft)
- Population (2019 census): 2,420
  - Density: 3.42/km^{2} (8.86/sq mi)

Ethnic distribution
  - 2019 census: Kanaks 90.21% Europeans 1.36% Wallisians and Futunans 0.45% Mixed 6.65% Other 1.32%
- Time zone: UTC+11:00
- INSEE/Postal code: 98823 /98823
- ^{1} New Caledonia Land Register (DITTT) data, which exclude lakes and ponds larger than 1 km² (0.386 sq mi or 247 acres) as well as the estuaries of rivers.

Ponérihouen (French: [pɔneʁiwɛ̃], Paicî: Pwäräiriwa) is a commune in the North Province of New Caledonia, an overseas territory of France in the Pacific Ocean.

Ponérihouen is the birthplace of the writer, feminist and politician Déwé Gorodey, who served as vice-president of the congress from 2001 to 2009.
