= Pouembout =

Commune of New Caledonia

- Commune
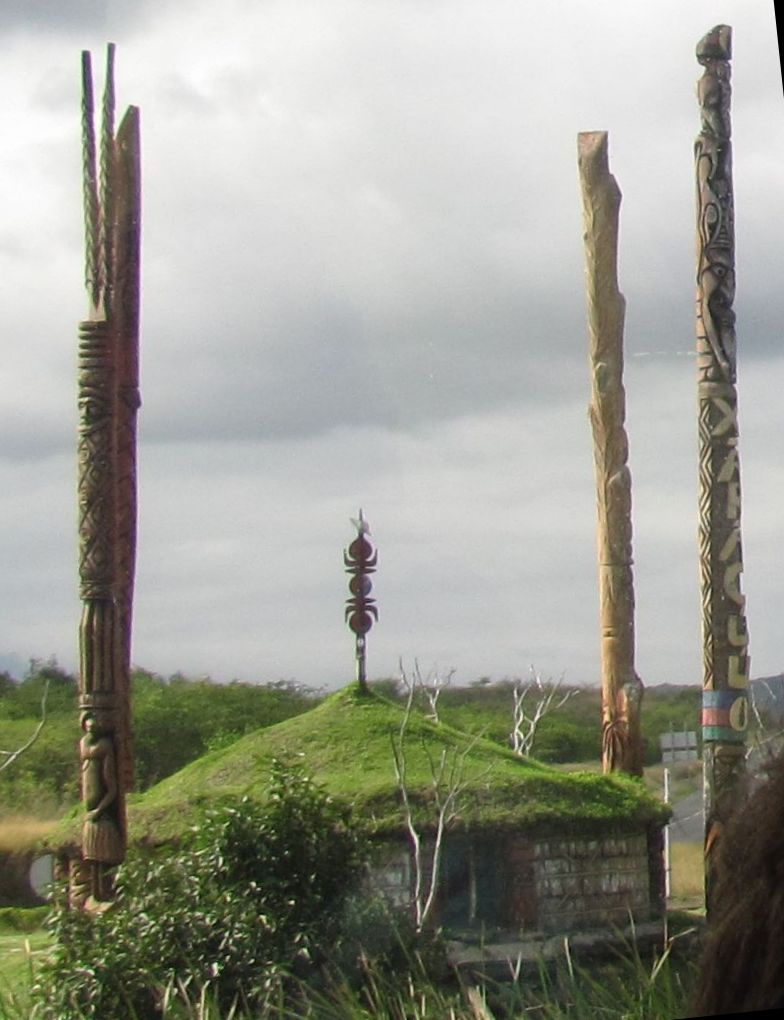
- Traditional architecture in Pouembout

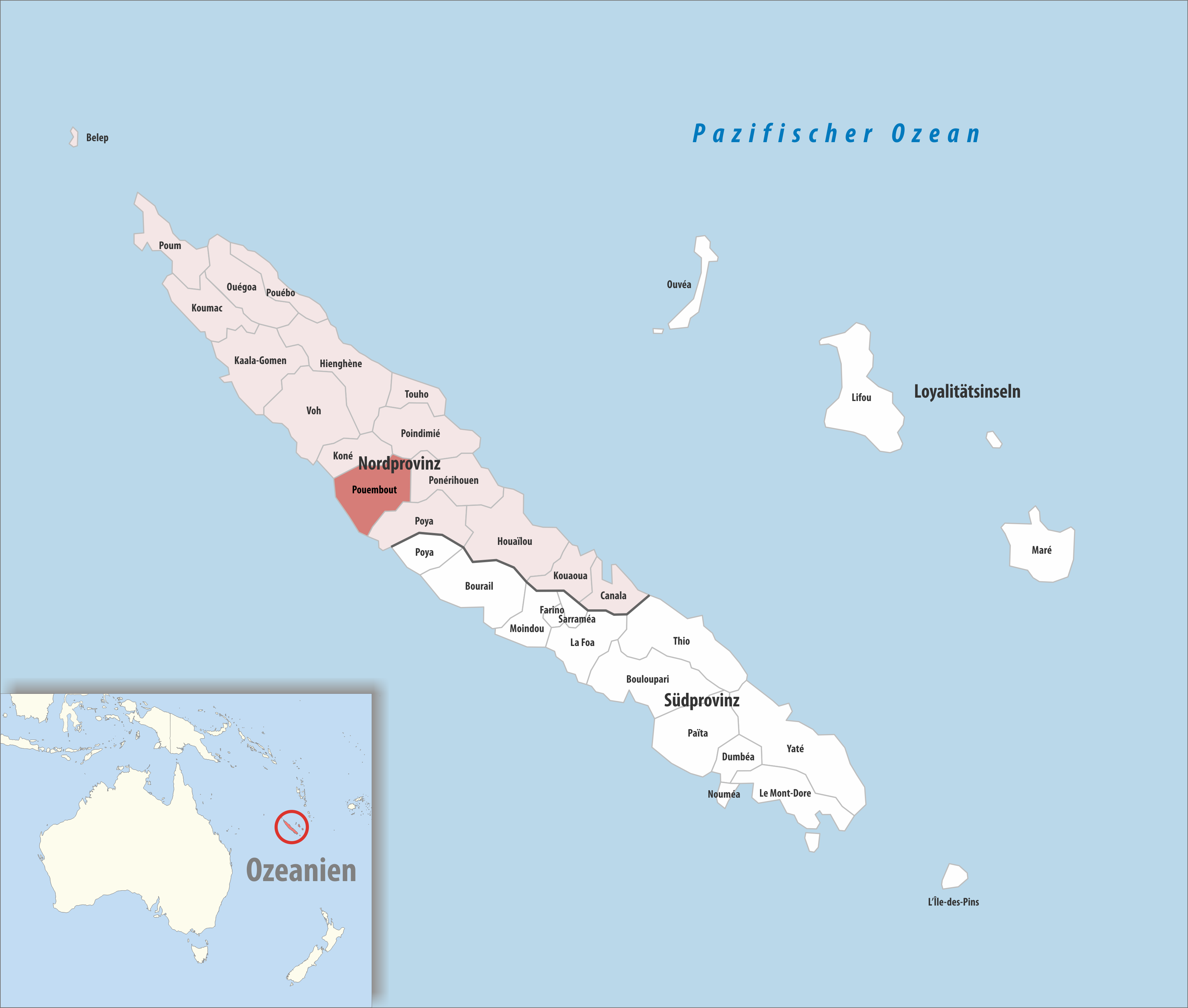
- Location of the commune (in red) within New Caledonia
- Location of Pouembout
- Coordinates: 21°07′40″S 164°53′18″E
- Country: France
- Sui generis collectivity: New Caledonia
- Province: North Province

Government
  - Mayor (2020–2026): Yann Peraldi
- Area^{1}: 674.3 km^{2} (260.3 sq mi)
- Elevation: 10 m (33 ft)
- Highest elevation: 1,134 m (3,720 ft)
- Lowest elevation: 0 m (0 ft)
- Population (2019 census): 2,752
  - Density: 4.081/km^{2} (10.57/sq mi)

Ethnic distribution
  - 2019 census: Kanaks 36.41% Europeans 26.34% Wallisians and Futunans 1.82% Mixed 18.13% Other 17.3%
- Time zone: UTC+11:00
- INSEE/Postal code: 98825 /98825
- ^{1} New Caledonia Land Register (DITTT) data, which exclude lakes and ponds larger than 1 km² (0.386 sq mi or 247 acres) as well as the estuaries of rivers.

Pouembout (French: [pwɛ̃but], Paicî: Pwëbuu) is a commune in the North Province of New Caledonia, an overseas territory of France in the Pacific Ocean.

== Geography ==
=== Climate ===
Pouembout has a tropical savanna climate (Köppen climate classification Aw). The average annual temperature in Pouembout is 23.5 °C (74.3 °F). The average annual rainfall is 1,002.6 mm (39.47 in) with January as the wettest month. The temperatures are highest on average in February, at around 27.0 °C (80.6 °F), and lowest in July, at around 19.6 °C (67.3 °F). The highest temperature ever recorded in Pouembout was 37.9 °C (100.2 °F) on 19 November 1968; the coldest temperature ever recorded was 6.0 °C (42.8 °F) on 26 July 1970.

Climate data for Pouembout (1981–2010 averages, extremes 1962−2009)
Month	Jan	Feb	Mar	Apr	May	Jun	Jul	Aug	Sep	Oct	Nov	Dec	Year
Record high °C (°F)	37.3 (99.1)	37.3 (99.1)	35.5 (95.9)	34.0 (93.2)	34.1 (93.4)	32.9 (91.2)	31.1 (88.0)	32.0 (89.6)	34.3 (93.7)	34.6 (94.3)	37.9 (100.2)	37.1 (98.8)	37.9 (100.2)
Mean daily maximum °C (°F)	31.9 (89.4)	31.8 (89.2)	31.1 (88.0)	29.8 (85.6)	28.0 (82.4)	26.2 (79.2)	25.2 (77.4)	25.6 (78.1)	27.3 (81.1)	29.1 (84.4)	30.3 (86.5)	31.4 (88.5)	29.0 (84.2)
Daily mean °C (°F)	26.8 (80.2)	27.0 (80.6)	26.2 (79.2)	24.7 (76.5)	22.7 (72.9)	20.9 (69.6)	19.6 (67.3)	19.8 (67.6)	21.1 (70.0)	23.0 (73.4)	24.5 (76.1)	25.9 (78.6)	23.5 (74.3)
Mean daily minimum °C (°F)	21.7 (71.1)	22.1 (71.8)	21.4 (70.5)	19.5 (67.1)	17.5 (63.5)	15.7 (60.3)	14.0 (57.2)	14.0 (57.2)	14.8 (58.6)	16.8 (62.2)	18.8 (65.8)	20.4 (68.7)	18.0 (64.4)
Record low °C (°F)	14.0 (57.2)	13.6 (56.5)	12.0 (53.6)	10.1 (50.2)	8.5 (47.3)	6.5 (43.7)	6.0 (42.8)	6.5 (43.7)	7.5 (45.5)	6.2 (43.2)	11.0 (51.8)	11.0 (51.8)	6.0 (42.8)
Average precipitation mm (inches)	158.4 (6.24)	156.9 (6.18)	157.4 (6.20)	68.7 (2.70)	72.1 (2.84)	67.8 (2.67)	48.7 (1.92)	44.2 (1.74)	29.3 (1.15)	32.3 (1.27)	58.1 (2.29)	108.7 (4.28)	1,002.6 (39.47)
Average precipitation days (≥ 1.0 mm)	9.2	10.7	11.0	6.6	5.9	6.5	5.3	4.9	3.1	3.8	5.4	7.8	80.3
Source: Meteociel
