= La Foa =

Commune of New Caledonia

- Commune
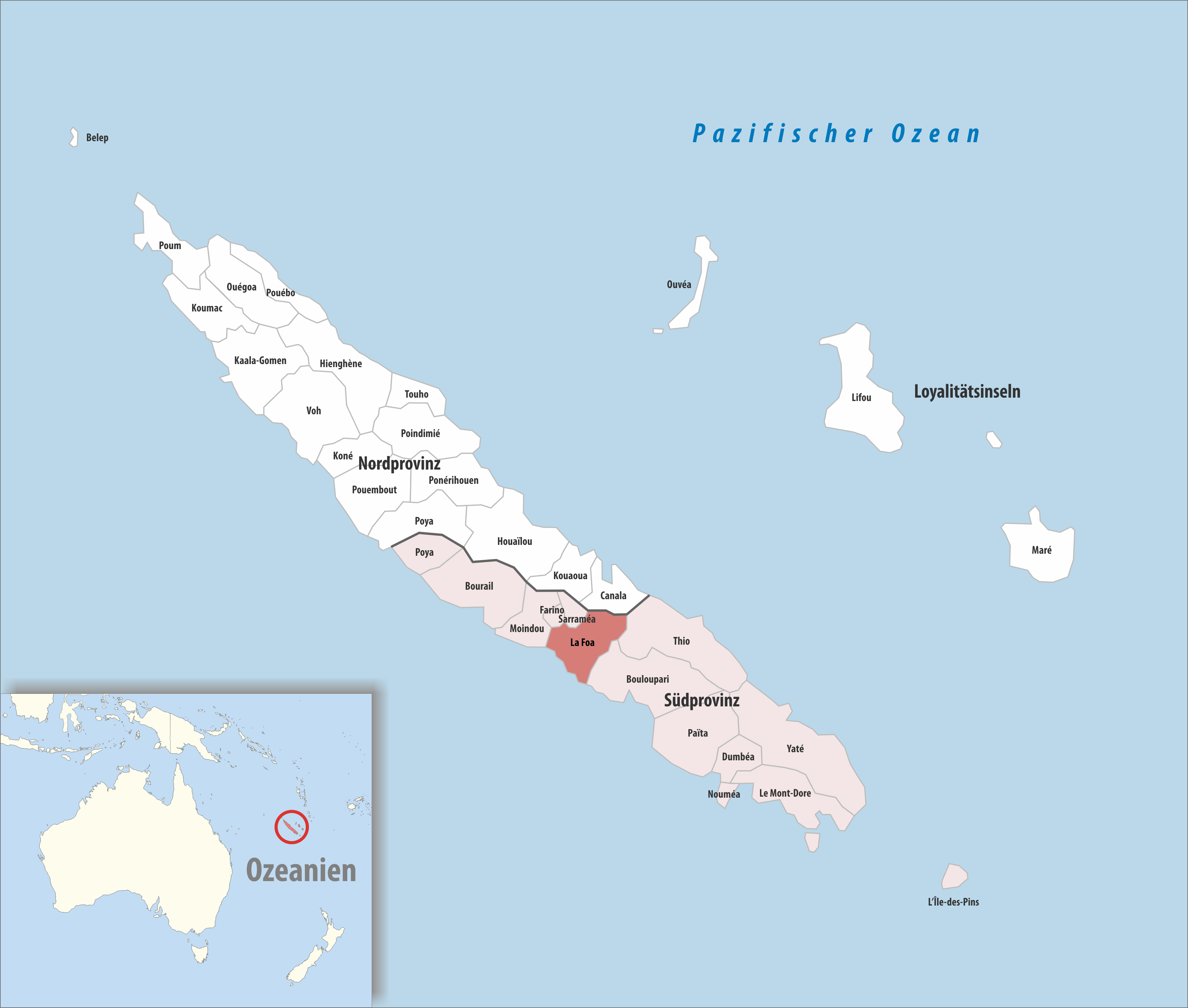
- Location of the commune (in red) within New Caledonia
- Location of La Foa
- Coordinates: 21°42′41″S 165°49′06″E
- Country: France
- Sui generis collectivity: New Caledonia
- Province: South Province

Government
  - Mayor (2022–2026): Florence Rolland
- Area^{1}: 464.0 km^{2} (179.2 sq mi)
- Elevation: 20 m (66 ft)
- Highest elevation: 1,058 m (3,471 ft)
- Lowest elevation: 0 m (0 ft)
- Population (2019 census): 3,552
  - Density: 7.655/km^{2} (19.83/sq mi)

Ethnic distribution
  - 2019 census: Kanaks 31.11% Europeans 28.66% Wallisians and Futunans 10.67% Mixed 17.96% Other 11.6%
- Time zone: UTC+11:00
- INSEE/Postal code: 98813 /98880
- ^{1} New Caledonia Land Register (DITTT) data, which exclude lakes and ponds larger than 1 km² (0.386 sq mi or 247 acres) as well as the estuaries of rivers.

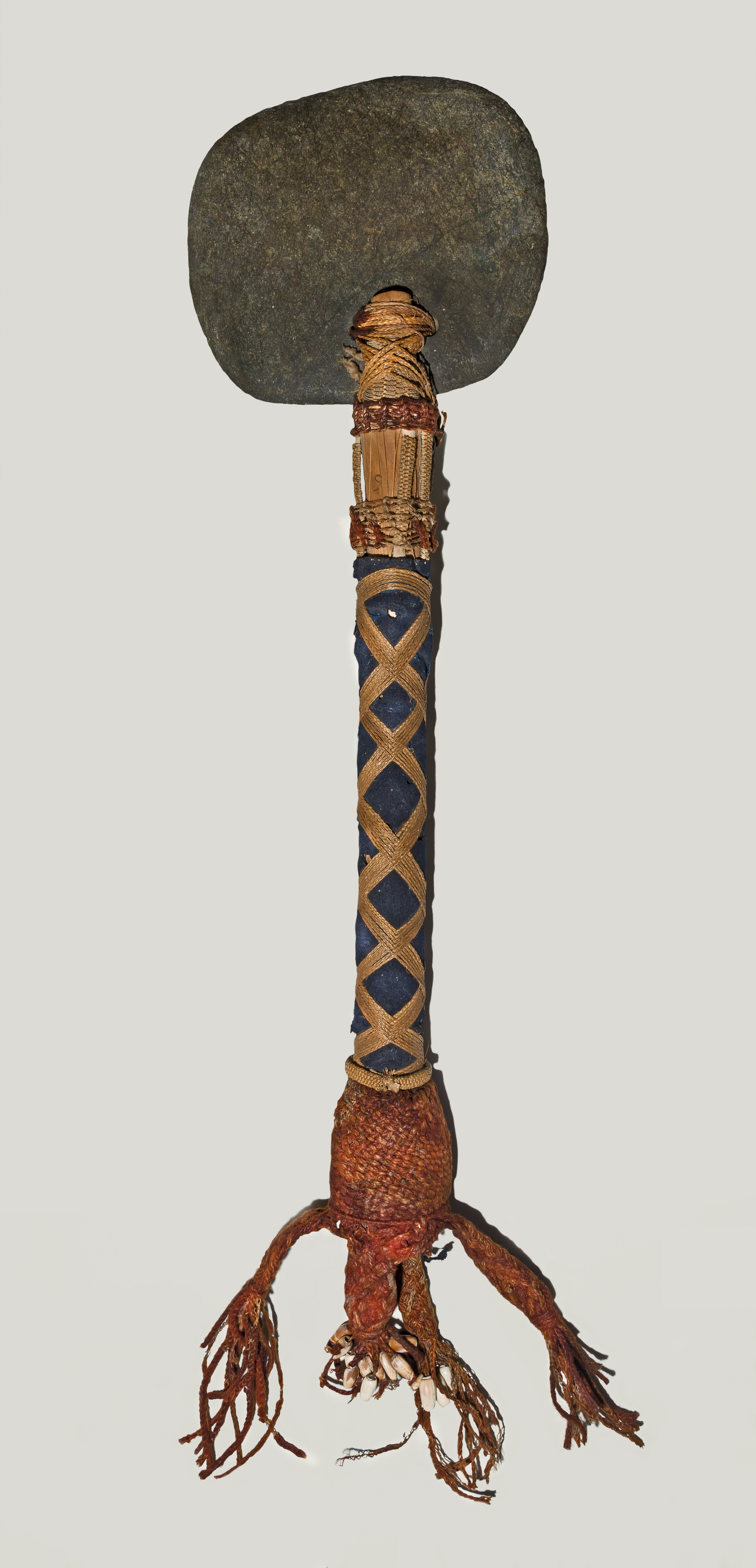
O'kono ceremonial ax - La Foa MHNT

La Foa (French: [la fwa], Xârâcùù: Foha) is a commune in the South Province of New Caledonia, an overseas territory of France in the Pacific Ocean.

Although the provincial seat of the South Province is in Nouméa, La Foa was made the chief town of the administrative subdivision of the South in order to counterbalance the overwhelming weight of Nouméa in New Caledonia. Both entities share an almost identical territory, but their status and role is quite different: the South Province, with its provincial assembly in Nouméa, is a full political division, whereas the administrative subdivision of the South is only an administrative division of the French central state, akin to an arrondissement of Metropolitan France, with a Deputy Commissioner of the Republic (commissaire délégué de la République), akin to a subprefect of metropolitan France, in residence in La Foa.

== Geography ==
=== Climate ===
La Foa has a tropical savanna climate (Köppen climate classification Aw). The average annual temperature in La Foa is 22.7 °C (72.9 °F). The average annual rainfall is 1,128.4 mm (44.43 in) with February as the wettest month. The temperatures are highest on average in February, at around 26.5 °C (79.7 °F), and lowest in July, at around 18.9 °C (66.0 °F). The highest temperature ever recorded in La Foa was 38.0 °C (100.4 °F) on 12 December 1952; the coldest temperature ever recorded was 4.2 °C (39.6 °F) on 29 July 1968.

Climate data for La Foa (1991−2020 normals, extremes 1952−present)
Month	Jan	Feb	Mar	Apr	May	Jun	Jul	Aug	Sep	Oct	Nov	Dec	Year
Record high °C (°F)	36.4 (97.5)	37.1 (98.8)	36.9 (98.4)	34.8 (94.6)	33.5 (92.3)	32.5 (90.5)	31.2 (88.2)	32.0 (89.6)	34.5 (94.1)	34.8 (94.6)	37.2 (99.0)	38.0 (100.4)	38.0 (100.4)
Mean daily maximum °C (°F)	31.7 (89.1)	31.8 (89.2)	30.9 (87.6)	29.5 (85.1)	27.5 (81.5)	26.0 (78.8)	25.1 (77.2)	25.3 (77.5)	26.9 (80.4)	28.8 (83.8)	30.1 (86.2)	31.3 (88.3)	28.7 (83.7)
Daily mean °C (°F)	26.0 (78.8)	26.5 (79.7)	25.8 (78.4)	24.0 (75.2)	21.8 (71.2)	20.1 (68.2)	18.9 (66.0)	18.9 (66.0)	20.0 (68.0)	21.9 (71.4)	23.5 (74.3)	25.3 (77.5)	22.7 (72.9)
Mean daily minimum °C (°F)	20.4 (68.7)	21.3 (70.3)	20.7 (69.3)	18.5 (65.3)	16.0 (60.8)	14.2 (57.6)	12.6 (54.7)	12.5 (54.5)	13.1 (55.6)	15.0 (59.0)	16.9 (62.4)	19.2 (66.6)	16.7 (62.1)
Record low °C (°F)	12.0 (53.6)	9.0 (48.2)	12.2 (54.0)	8.8 (47.8)	7.0 (44.6)	4.9 (40.8)	4.2 (39.6)	5.4 (41.7)	5.3 (41.5)	6.0 (42.8)	8.5 (47.3)	11.4 (52.5)	4.2 (39.6)
Average precipitation mm (inches)	155.0 (6.10)	184.3 (7.26)	177.3 (6.98)	102.9 (4.05)	78.0 (3.07)	72.2 (2.84)	64.8 (2.55)	62.7 (2.47)	35.7 (1.41)	29.6 (1.17)	63.2 (2.49)	102.7 (4.04)	1,128.4 (44.43)
Average precipitation days (≥ 1.0 mm)	9.9	11.4	11.7	7.8	7.4	7.0	6.5	6.2	4.0	3.9	5.7	8.1	89.5
Source: Météo-France
