= South Province, New Caledonia =

Coordinates: 21°55′S 166°20′E

South Province Province Sud
- Flag

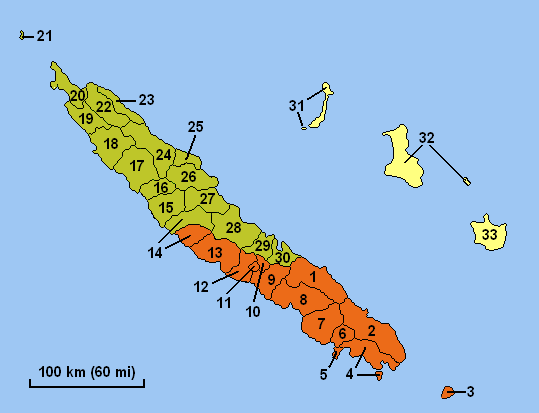
- Location of South Province in New Caledonia
- Country: France
- Collectivity: New Caledonia
- Seat: Nouméa

Government
  - President: Sonia Backès

Area
  - Total: 7,012 km^{2} (2,707 sq mi)

Population (2019 census)
  - Total: 203,144
  - Density: 28.97/km^{2} (75.03/sq mi)

Communities (2019)
  - European: 29.68%
  - Kanak: 28.79%
  - Multiracial: 12.53%
  - Wallisian/Futunan: 10.82%
  - Tahitian: 2.47%
  - Indonesian: 1.65%
  - Vietnamese: 1.07%
  - Ni-Vanuatu: 1.07%
  - Other Asian: 0.53%
  - Other: 11.3%
- Website: www.province-sud.nc

The South Province (French: Province Sud) is one of three administrative divisions in New Caledonia. It corresponds to the southern and southwestern portion of the New Caledonian mainland.

It is by far the most economically developed and most urbanized part of the archipelago and indeed in the entire Melanesian region. The South Province is also the only part of New Caledonia - and Melanesia - where ethnic Melanesians do not constitute an absolute majority of the population, and the only province where anti-independence groups control the provincial government.

The provincial assembly and executive are in Nouméa. The administrative services of the French state, however, are located in La Foa, with a Deputy Commissioner of the Republic (commissaire délégué de la République), akin to a subprefect of metropolitan France, in residence there. La Foa was chosen by the French central State in the late 1980s to counterbalance the overwhelming weight of Nouméa in New Caledonia

The central State administrative services in La Foa are not to be confused with the central State administrative services in Nouméa. The former manage local matters at the provincial level, whereas the latter, with the High Commissioner of the Republic in New Caledonia at their head, manage territorial matters for the whole of New Caledonia.

== Provincial Assembly ==
Of the 40 seats in the provincial assembly, the Rally-UMP holds 15, the Caledonia Together has 12, the Future Together has 5, the Kanak and Socialist National Liberation Front has 4, the Movement for Diversity has 2, the Union for a Caledonian Destiny has 1 and there is 1 miscellaneous right (ex-Rally for Caledonia).

== Notable people ==
- Ilaïsaane Lauouvéa - former assembly member

== See also ==
- Politics of New Caledonia
