= North Province, New Caledonia =

Coordinates: 21°0′S 165°0′E

North Province Province Nord
- Flag

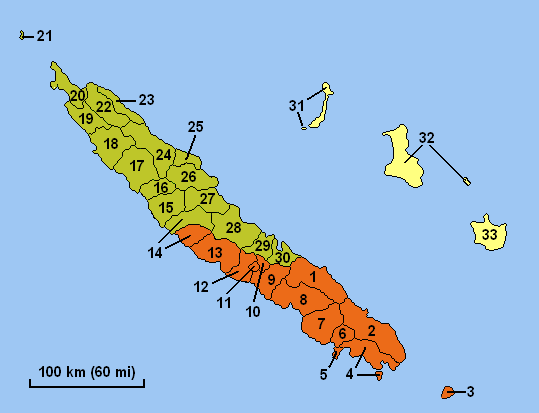
- Location of North Province in New Caledonia
- Country: France
- Collectivity: New Caledonia
- Seat: Koné

Government
  - President: Paul Néaoutyine

Area
  - Total: 9,582.6 km^{2} (3,699.9 sq mi)

Population (2019 Census)
  - Total: 49,910
  - Density: 5.208/km^{2} (13.49/sq mi)

Communities (2019)
  - Kanak: 72.16%
  - Multiracial: 9.9%
  - European: 9.75%
  - Wallisians and Futunans: 1.05%
  - Indonesians: 0.86%
  - Tahitian: 0.69%
  - Ni-Vanuatu: 0.26%
  - Other Asian: 0.2%
  - Vietnamese: 0.12%
  - Other: 5.01%
- Website: www.province-nord.nc

The North Province (French: province Nord) is one of three administrative divisions in New Caledonia. It corresponds to the northern and northeastern portion of the New Caledonian mainland.

The provincial government seat is at Koné.

== Provincial Congress ==
Of the 22 seats in the provincial congress, the Kanak and Socialist National Liberation Front holds 11, the Caledonian Union has 7, the Rally for Caledonia in the Republic has 3, and Future Together has 1.

== See also ==
- Politics of New Caledonia
