= New Caledonian languages =

Subgroup of the Oceanic branch of the Austronesian language family

New Caledonian
- Kanak
- Geographic distribution: New Caledonia
- Linguistic classification: Austronesian: Malayo-Polynesian; Oceanic; Southern Oceanic; New Caledonian
- Proto-language: Proto-New Caledonian

Language codes
- Glottolog: newc1243

The thirty New Caledonian languages, also known as Kanak languages, form a branch of the Southern Oceanic languages. Their speakers are known as Kanaks. One language is extinct, one is critically endangered, four are severely endangered, five are endangered, and another five are vulnerable to extinction.

== Typology ==
The Cèmuhî, Paicî, Drubea, Numèè, and Kwenyii languages are tonal.

Other than phonemically contrastive tone, typological features in New Caledonian languages that are typically unusual for Oceanic languages include nasalized vowels, very large vowel inventories, retroflex consonants, and voiceless nasals.

== Languages ==
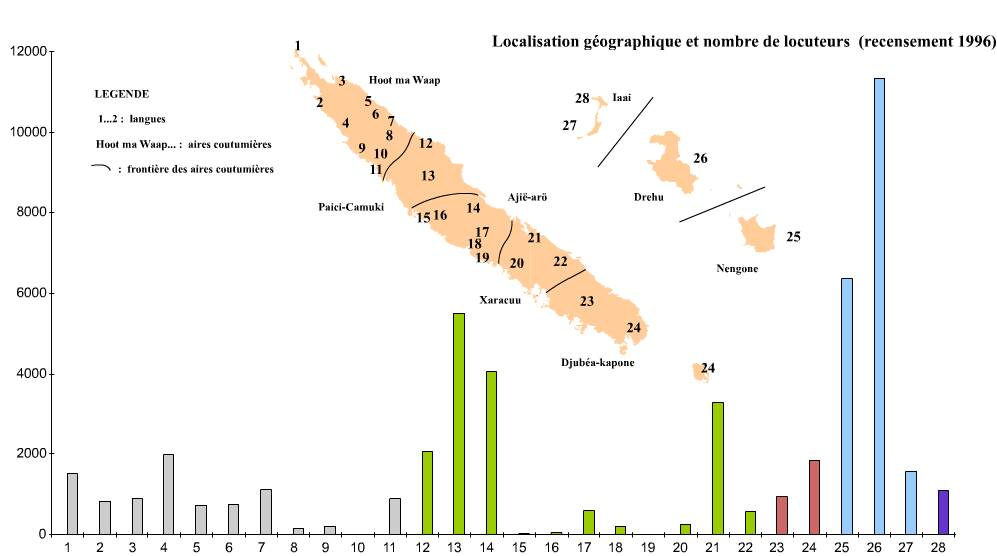
Populations of speakers of the native languages of New Caledonia. Grey, green, and red are the languages of the New Caledonian branch.

- Loyalty Islands
  - Drehu (Lifou Island)
  - Iaai (Ouvéa Island)
  - Nengone (Maré Island)
- Mainland New Caledonian
  - Southern New Caledonian
    - Extreme Southern
      - Ndrumbea (vulnerable)
      - Numèè
    - Mid-Southern
      - Xârâcùù–Xârâgurè:
        - Xârâcùù
        - Xârâgurè (endangered)
      - Zire–Tîrî:
        - Tîrî (endangered)
        - Zire †
      - Wailic
        - Ajië
        - Arhâ (severely endangered)
        - Arhö (critically endangered)
        - Neku (severely endangered)
        - Orowe (endangered)
  - Northern New Caledonian
    - Haeke*
    - Haveke*
    - Vamale*
    - Central Northern
      - Cèmuhî
      - Paicî
    - North Northern
      - Pwaamei (endangered)
      - Pwapwa (severely endangered)
        - Bwatoo
        - Hmwaveke
        - Waamwang
        - Fwâi
        - Jawe (vulnerable)
        - Nemi (vulnerable)
        - Pije (severely endangered)
    - Extreme Northern
      - Caac (vulnerable)
      - Kumak (vulnerable)
      - Nyâlayu
      - Yuanga

The languages of the northern Voh–Koné area (*) are often discussed as a unit.

== List of New Caledonian languages ==
	Language	Alternative Spelling	Speakers	Commune(s)	Province	Customary Area	Dialects
1	Nyâlayu language	Yalâyu	1522	Ouégoa, Belep, Pouébo	North Province	Hoot Ma Waap	Pooc/Haat (Belep); Puma/Paak/Ovac (Arama, Balade)
2	Kumak language	Fwa Kumak	1100 (2009)	Koumac, Poum	North Province	Hoot ma Waap	Nêlêmwâ (Nénéma tribe), Nixumwak
3	Caac language	-	890	Pouébo	North Province	Hoot Ma Waap	Cawac (variant spoken at Conception in Le Mont-Dore since 1865)
4	Yuanga language	Yûâga	1992	Kaala-Gomen, Ouégoa	North Province	Hoot Ma Waap	-
5	Jawe language	-	729	Hienghène, Pouébo	North Province	Hoot Ma Waap	-
6	Nemi language	Nèmi	768	Hienghène	North Province	Hoot Ma Waap	Ouanga, Ouélis, Kavatch
7	Fwâi language	-	1131	Hienghène	North Province	Hoot Ma Waap	-
8	Pije language	-	161	Hienghène	North Province	Hoot Ma Waap	Tha (Tiendanite)
9	Pwaamei language	-	219	Voh	North Province	Hoot Ma Waap	Naakâ (Temala, Voh); Dhaak/Yaak (Fatenaoue)
10	Pwapwâ language	-	16	Voh	North Province	Hoot Ma Waap	-
11	Voh-Koné dialects	-	878	Voh, Koné	North Province	Hoot Ma Waap	Bwatoo (Oudjo, Népou, Baco and once spoken on Koniène Island), Haeke, Haveke, Hmwaeke, Havele, Vamale (Haute Tipindje), Waamwang
12	Cèmuhî language	Camuki	2051	Touho, Koné, and Poindimié	North Province	Paici Camuki	-
13	Paicî language	Paici	5498	Poindimié, Ponérihouen, Koné, Poya	North Province	Paici-Camuki	-
14	Ajië language	A'jië	4044	Houaïlou, Ponérihouen, Poya, Kouaoua	North Province	Ajië-Aro	-
15	Arhâ language	-	35	Poya	North Province	Ajië-Aro	-
16	Arhö language	Arö	62	Poya	North Province	Ajië-Aro	-
17	Orowe language	Abwébwé	587	Bourail	South Province	Ajië-Aro	-
18	Neku language	Néku	221	Bourail Moindou	South Province	Ajië-Aro	-
19	Sîchë	Zîchë, Sîshëë	4 (extinct since April 2006)	Bourail, Moindou	South Province	Ajië-Aro	Sometimes considered a dialect of Ajië
20	Tîrî language	Tirî	264	La Foa, Sarraméa	South Province	Xaracuu	Tîrî, Mea
21	Xaracuu language	Xaracuu	3784	Canala, La Foa, Bouloupari	South Province	Xaracuu	-
22	Xârâgurè language	-	566	Thio, New Caledonia	South Province	Xaracuu	Language close to Xârâcùù
23	Ndrumbea language	Drubea	946	Païta, Dumbéa, Nouméa, Yaté	South Province	Djubéa-Kaponé	-
24	Numèè language	Numee/Kapone	1814	Yaté, Mont-Dore, Isle of Pines (New Caledonia)	South Province	Djubéa-Kaponé	Xêrê (Yaté), Wêê (île Ouen), kwênyii (Isle of Pines (New Caledonia))
25	Nengone language	-	6377	Maré Island, Tiga	Loyalty Islands	Nengone	Iwateno (ceremonial/chiefly language)
26	Drehu language	-	11338	Lifou Island	Loyalty Islands	Drehu	Miny (ceremonial/chiefly language)
27	Iaai language	-	1562	Ouvéa Island	Loyalty Islands	Iaai	-
