= Vamale language =

Austronesian language spoken in New Caledonia

Vamale
- Hmwaeke
- Native to: New Caledonia
- Native speakers: 180 (from 2016)
- Language family: Austronesian: Malayo-Polynesian; Oceanic; Southern Oceanic; New Caledonian – Loyalties; New Caledonian; Northern New Caledonian; Voh-Koné; Vamale
- Dialects: Vamale; Hmwaeke

Language codes
- ISO 639-3: mkt
- Glottolog: vama1243
- ELP: Vamale

Vamale (Pamale) is a Kanak language of northern New Caledonia. The Hmwaeke dialect, spoken in Tiéta, is fusing with Haveke and nearly extinct. Vamale is nowadays spoken in Tiendanite (called "Usa Vamale"), We Hava, Téganpaïk and Tiouandé. It was spoken in the Pamale valley and its tributaries Vawe and Usa until the colonial war of 1917, when its speakers were displaced.

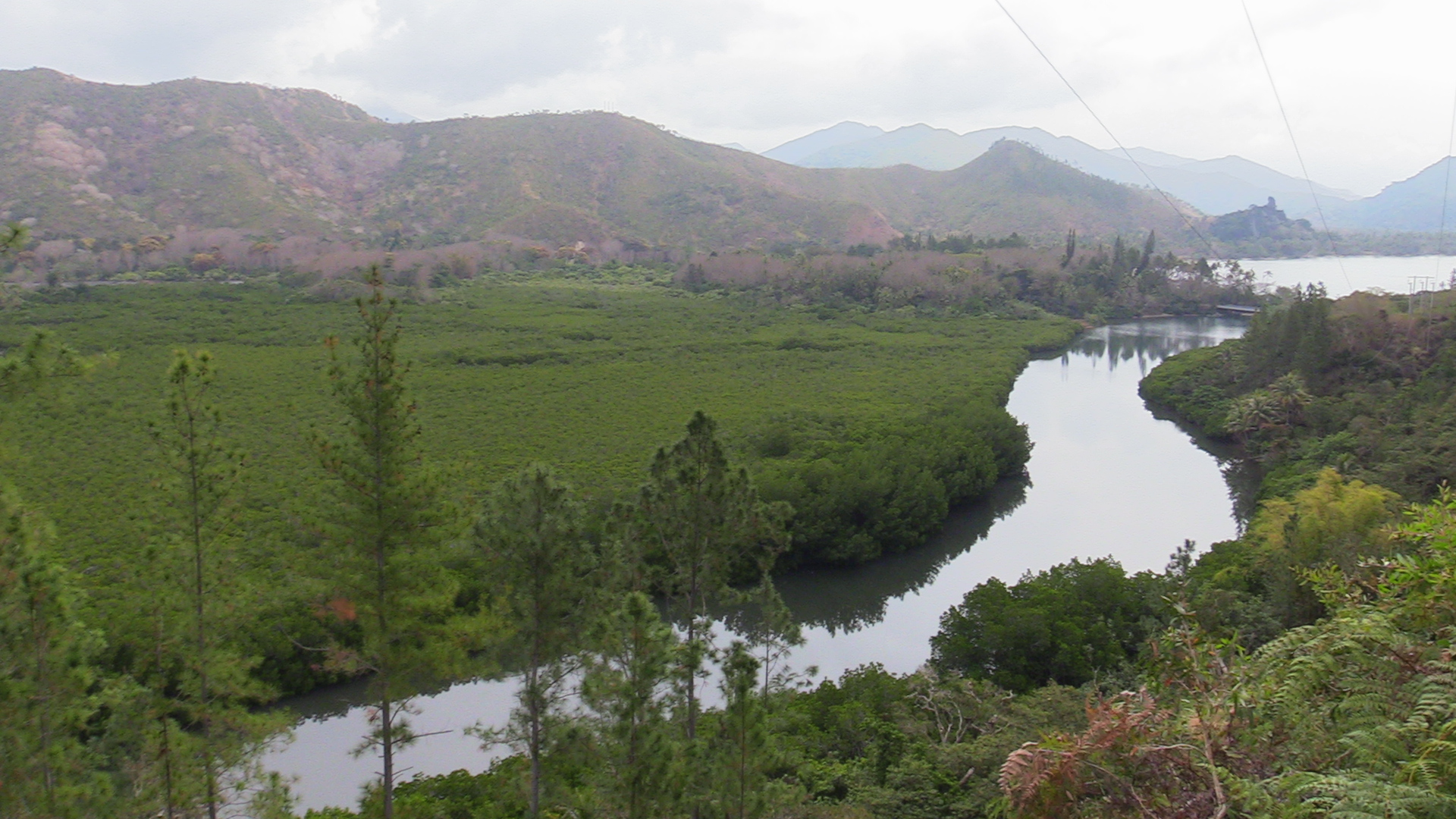
The estuary and mangrove of Tiouandé, a major village of Vamale speakers

== Phonology ==
Vamale has five phonemic vowel articulations, and 35 consonant phonemes.

=== Vowels ===
While Vamale distinguishes five vowel phonemes, nasality and length are phonemic as well. Compare /tã/ 'oven' and /ta/ 'go up', /ˈfa.ti/ 'speech' and /ˈfaː.ti/ 'to stick, to glue'.

Depending on the length of the vowel, and on the final consonant of the syllable, /e/ and /o/ can be realized more open: plosives and short syllables trigger open vowels (e.g. [tɔːt] 'grass' [sɛn] 'poison'), while open syllables, and long ones closed by nasals, feature closed vowels.

	Front	Central	Back
Close	i		u
Close-mid	e		o
Open-mid	ɛ		ɔ
Open		a	

=== Consonants ===
As is typical of Northern New Caledonian languages, Vamale has a wealth of consonants. The distinction reconstructible since Proto-Oceanic is between nasals, semi-nasals (pre-nasalized voiced plosives, i.e. /ᵐb/, /ⁿɟ/ etc.), and orals.

		Labial		Alveolar	Palatal	Velar		Glottal
		plain	labialized	Alveolar	Palatal	plain	labialized	Glottal
Plosive	plain	p	pʷ	t	c	k		
Plosive	aspirated	pʰ	pʰʷ	tʰ	(cʰ) (Note: Non-phoneme)	kʰ		
Plosive	nasalized	ᵐb	ᵐbʷ	ⁿd	ⁿɟ	ᵑg		
Nasal	voiceless	m̥	m̥ʷ	n̥	ɲ̥	(ŋ̊)		
Nasal	voiced	m	mʷ	n	ɲ	ŋ		
Fricative	voiceless	f	fʷ			x	xʷ	h
Fricative	voiced	v	vʷ			ɣ		
Approximant					j		w	
Lateral	voiceless			l̥				
Lateral	voiced			l				
Tap				(ɾ)				

=== Stress ===
In Vamale, disyllabic words have penultimate stress, as is typical in Oceanic settings. Trisyllabic, morphologically simple, non-derived nouns take stress on the first syllable. These are rare, though loanwords now increase their number. Longer words are morphologically complex and put stress on the penultimate stress-bearing unit, which is often a syllable of the root, but not always. While some morphological factors complicate the picture, regular phonological aspects predict most stress positions. A closed syllable will be stressed over an open one, a fortis onset will usually top a tenuis onset, and a long syllable will be stressed above all else. This gives us a hierarchy of factors:

Long syllable > fortis onset > closed syllable > penultimate syllable

Some monosyllabic morphemes do not count in the stress pattern. One frequent example is the extrametrical suffix -ke 'TR', whose phonological non-importance makes the third syllable in /fʷan.ˈɟi.mʷa.ke/ 'ask something' the penultimate of the phonological word. -ke may be related to the proclitic ka which marks subjects and possessors.

Possessive and object-indexing suffixes shift the stress, but not in a simple syllable-counting way, as [ˈᵐbwãn.ɟɛp] 'bark clapper (a type of hand drum', [ᵐbwãn.ˈɟɛp.go] 'hand drum, hand drum-2G.POSS' would suggest, i.e. with the stress, all things being equal, moving to the new penultimate syllable. However, since bwanjep-gavwe [ˌᵐbwãn.ˈɟɛp.ga.vʷe] 'hand drum-2PL.POSS' does not have the stress on the penultimate syllable of the phonological word, [ga], this suggests an analysis of root syllables that is different from that of suffixed morphology. Possessive and object-indexing suffixes count as a single unit in stress assignment, meaning that a two-syllable possessive suffix such as -gavwe '2SG.POSS (your)' has the same effect as -go '2SG.POSS, your (singular)'.

Speech act participant indexes (the proclitics, not the suffixes) are also extrametrical:

/ˈɣa.le.ke/ 'to see'
le=ˈɣa.le-le/ '3PL=see-3PL.OBJ', 'they see them'
/le=ɣa.le-ˈkaː.vʷe/ 'they see you', also pronounced /le=ɣa.ˈle.ka.vʷe/

Other syllables attract stress. The nominalizer xa- 'AGT.NMLZ' (from xayu 'male') always attracts stress (probably due to its etymology, but not hun- 'manner.NMLZ' nor ape- 'place.NMLZ' (from ape- 'trace').

[ˈhun.vʷa ] 'way of doing'	[a.ˈpe.ta] 'ladder (place of going.up)'
[hun.ˈmõː] 'way of living'	[a.pe.ˈmõː] 'dwelling'

Semantically bleached function words like /a.ˈman/ 'thing; object place-holder' are re-analyzed as one foot in compounds:

[ˈtɕaj.n̥ãn] 'know', [tɕaj.ˈn̥ãn.ã.mãn] 'know something'
[tɕãm.bi] 'smash', [e.tɕãm.ˈbi.jã.mãn] 'hammer'

The complex word ape-caihnan-aman-le, 'NMLZ-know-thing-3PL.POSS' 'their knowledge', is pronounced [ˌa.pe.tɕaj.n̥ãn.ã.ˈmãn.le], which could be explained by analyzing (ape-)caihnan-aman '(fact.of-)know-thing' as a compound, -le 'their' as a suffix, and thus the main stress on the penultimate syllable.

For Hmwaveke, stress is described as being fundamentally penultimate, and forms which deviate from this, with few exceptions, are analyzed by Campbell as several phonological words. Campbell analyzes long syllables in plurisyllabic words as resulting from stress (suggesting that, fundamentally, length is a feature of all stressed syllables). For Vamale, though long syllables are stressed, we argue that the relation is reversedː length attracts stress.

In Nêlêmwa, stress is usually on the first syllable of the lexical root kâ-ˈyuva 'how? (lying.down-be.thus)'. This correlation between morphological makeup and stress pattern is mirrored in Vamale to a certain extent, in that bound morphemes such as e- 'RECP', -ke 'TR', and manner prefixes like mi- 'do lying down' do not affect the position of the main stress.

== Syntax ==
Like many Oceanic languages, Vamale has no adjectives, using instead stative verbs to express most state-like meanings. Besides a wealth of small classes of function words, the biggest classes in Vamale are nominal, including pronouns, and verbal.

=== Pronouns ===
Personal pronouns
		singular	dual	plural
1st person	exclusive	yo	abu	abe
1st person	inclusive	yo	gasu	gase/gaa
2nd person		go	gau	gavwe
3rd person		ya	lu	le

Demonstrative pronouns
	singular	dual	plural
Proximal	ehni	muuhni	niehni
Distal	ena	muuna	niena

=== Nouns ===
Nouns can be classified along several axes: alienability determines whether a noun must show possessive morphology or not, and directness shows whether possession is marked via a suffix on the noun stem, or via e.g. a possessive classifier.

==== Possession ====
Inalienable possessive suffixes
		singular	dual	plural
1st person	EXCL	-ong	-(a)bu	-(a)be
1st person	INCL	-ong	-(a)ju	-(a)je
2nd person		-m	-(a)u	-(a)vwe
3rd person		-n	-(a)lu	-(a)le

Alienable possessive suffixes
		singular	dual	plural
1st person	EXCL	-(e)ong	-abu	-abu
1st person	INCL	-(e)ong	-gasu	-gaa
2nd person		-go	-u	-gavwe
3rd person		-(e)a	-lu	-le

=== Classifiers ===
Vamale has few classifiers, mostly concerned with the nature of food and drink. Two words distinguish drinks: udoo- 'cold drink' and fatoo- 'warm drink'. Food items are classified as follows: u- 'juicy food' xhua- 'proteiny food', ya- 'starchy food', with some rarer words for chewy foods such as roots (fwaa-), and crunchy ones such as sugarcane (xhuta-).

=== Aspect ===
Vamale marks tempus only coincidentally, but shows prolific use of aspect markers.

Aspect in Kanak languages is expressed with morphemes which often combine aspectual, modal, and temporal meanings. Overall, Vamale aspect closely resembles its counterparts in its northern sisters Nêlêmwa, Caac, and Bwatoo. The differences between them, however, may shed some light on the development of aspectual systems in the region, and provide evidence for a distinction between old and new forms. This in turn could tell us which meanings were expressed first, and if new ones were borrowed, where they came from.

Gloss	Vamale	Bwatoo	Nêlêmwa
IPFV	bwa	bwa	baa / fwâ
FUT/IRR	bo / o	b(wato)o / ro	io (*ixo), virt. o
ACC	ja	je	(k)u
PFV	pa	pi	
HAB	xa ([ɣa])	xha ([xa])	
ASS	tha	tha	bara (adversative), xam gum daa
CONT	balan	ra (-lan from balan?)	gaa / gat / hââ
Common truth	-	ko	-
FREQ	mu		aa, kua

Balan is interesting because while it can be used alone, it is used with many other aspectual markers, its meaning changing every time.

- Wordhood: Aspectual markers (Bril calls them „morphemes“, as does Cauchard) are the only elements that can be inserted between a person marker and a verb but cannot separate an article from the nominal predicate it modifies. This raises the question whether they are best seen as particles, clitics, or affixes. This view argues for a particle status, on the basis of syntactic arguments.
- Position: Even though most markers occur between the person marker and the predicate (nominal or verbal), repetitive mwa is a post-predicate particle.

e= balan thapoke mwa i= vaaya mwa
1SG= CONT begin REP DEF.SG= work REP
'I just began again the work already mentioned'

- Combinability: Combinations are possible, in some cases preferred to the lone form (especially with ja and balan), and may be non-compositional. They only occur in the canonical order (i.e. between the person marker and the predicate), which increases the appeal of a syntactic analysis of such elements.
- Function: The meaning of aspectual markers depends on their position and the aktionsart of the verb (the latter of which can be changed by context and dedicated morphemes). Whether bwa ‚IPFV‘ occurs before or after the person marker subtly distinguishes between related meanings, as does the order of markers in combinations. This flexibility is not common to all markers, however.

e= balan majit
1SG= CONT {lie, rest}
'I continue to rest.'

e= [bwa balan thapoke] i= vaaya
1SG= IPFV CONT begin DEF.SG= work
'I am beginning the work, I have just begun the work'

e= [ja balan thapoke] i= vaaya
1SG= ACC CONT begin DEF.SG= work
'I am finally about to begin the work, I have finally begun the work'

bwa e- [balan thapoke] i vaaya
IPFV 1SG CONT begin ART work
'Still I have just begun the work (I haven't gone far in the work yet)'

=== Alignment ===
In New Caledonia, northern languages tend towards ergativity, and southern ones to accusativity. Vamale, on the border between the two, is split-transitive and tripartite in its verb-indexing, nominative-accusative in its subject marking on noun phrases, and has ergative patterns in nominalized verbs.

Verbs in Vamale, like in Proto-Oceanic, can be classified as either “active”, with subject indexing preceding the verb, or “stative”, with subject indexing suffixed to the stem. Nominal predicates follow the active pattern, and all transitive verbs are active. While class membership is lexically determined following semantic tendencies, some derivation may take place (always from stative to active or active to active).

This is a split-transitive system, and is further complicated by the fact that objects are indexed as suffixes, much like stative subjects, but do not use identical forms.

	Active subject index	Object index	Stative subject index	Free pronoun
1SG	e=	-o	-o ~-ong	io
2SG	go=	-ko	-go	go
3SG	a=	-(e)a	-(e)a	ia
2DU	gau=	-kau	-gau	gau
3DU	lu=	-lu	-lu	lu

The forms seem derived from former free-standing forms, which still exist, but can only co-occur with the subject index (not the object ones). They show nominative-accusative alignment regardless of the verb’s class.

le= vavi-a ka=le
3PL= hunt.TR-3SG.OBJ SUBJ=3PL
‘They hunt it’

le= vavi i=dube ka=le
3PL= hunt.TR ART.SG=deer SUBJ=3PL
‘They hunt the deer’

However, while subject and object indexing on verbs has a split-transitive, tripartite alignment, deverbal nominalizations show a more ergative alignment: undergoers and intransitive subjects are indexed alike, while transitive subjects are distinct.

In Vamale, as in many other Oceanic languages, whole verb phrases, with dependent verbs and objects, can be nominalized by dropping the pre-verbal subject index and adding an article instead. Often, a nominalizer is added as well.

le=saxhuti i=[hun-thake hanu ka=yo]
3PL=narrate ART.SG=NMLZ-throw picture SUBJ=1SG
‘They tell the story of my playing cards.’

Free pronouns are marked as subjects with a proclitic ka. Another ka is a linker that shows a special possessive relationship e.g. to a chief (daahma ka-m ‘chief LNK-2SG.POSS’), or between medicine and ailment (udee ka-n nyaabu ‘medicine LNK-NSPEC mosquito’). If the possessor is anaphoric information (“their chief”), or the relationship a generic one (“mosquito repellent”), this is indexed on the linker via possessive morphology (instead of using the whole noun phrase), not with free pronouns. Note that there is also an animacy distinction: specific animate entities are always indexed with possessive morphology. This is the linker’s main morphosyntactic distinction from the subject-marking proclitic, which cannot take affixes.

Nominalized intransitive verbs, and nominalized transitive verbs where the subject is not expressed via a free form, share the same indexing morphology.

i=hun-vavi ka-n dube
ART.SG=NMLZ-hunt.TR LNK-NSPEC dear
‘The hunting of deer’

i=hun-moo ka i=mwa
ART.SG=NMLZ-be LNK ART.SG=house
‘The nature (lit. way of being) of the house’

Due to the homophonous relationship of the linker ka and the subject marker ka, a nominalized transitive construction featuring both an undergoer NP and a subject NP will favour the subject marker and omit the linker. Ignoring this preference is not ungrammatical per se, but labelled as “confusing”, since the resulting construction may end up looking like this: V ka O ka A.
