= Kaala-Gomen =

Commune of New Caledonia

- Commune
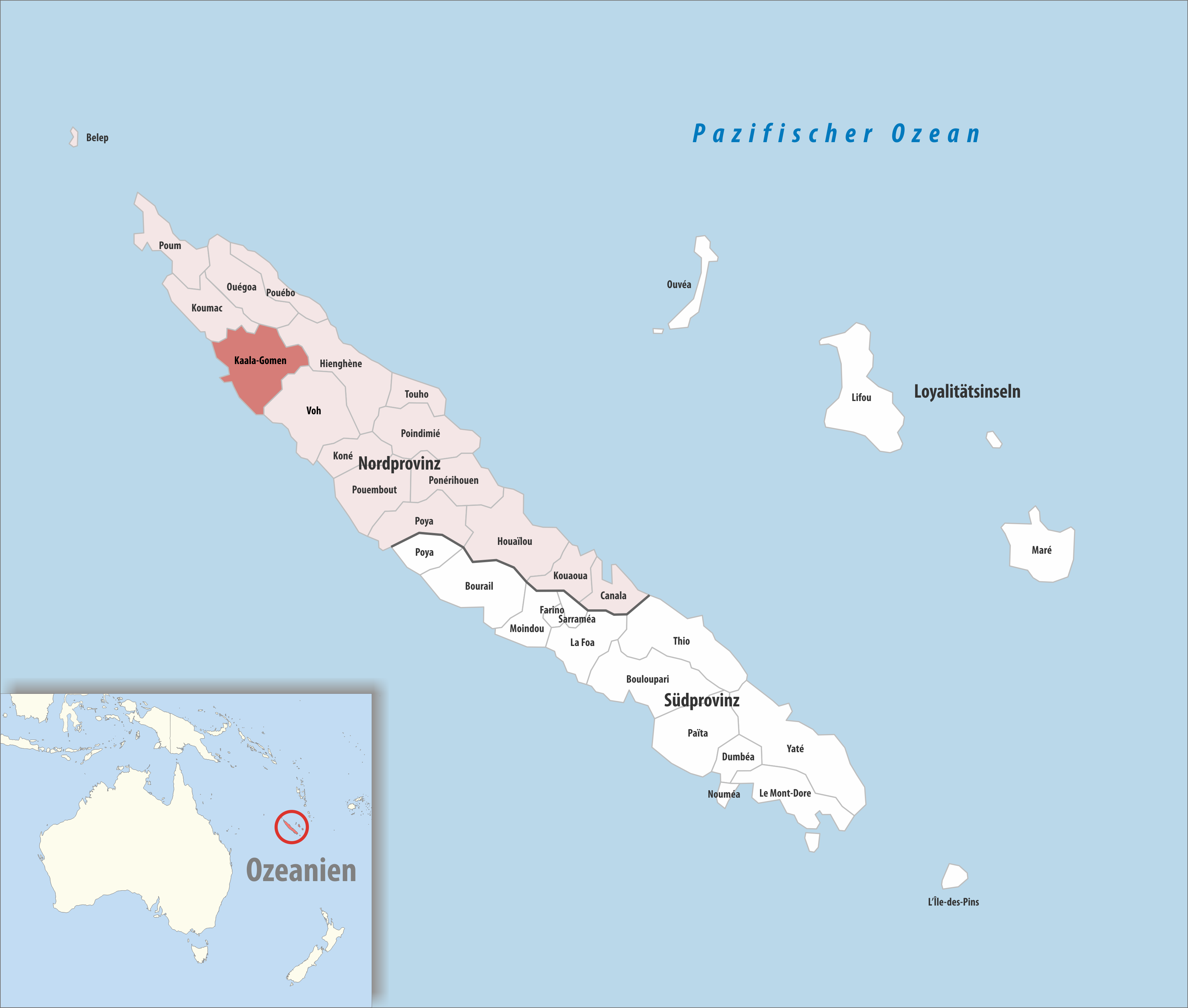
- Location of the commune (in red) within New Caledonia
- Location of Kaala-Gomen
- Coordinates: 20°40′S 164°24′E
- Country: France
- Sui generis collectivity: New Caledonia
- Province: Province Nord

Government
  - Mayor (2020–2026): Alain Levant
- Area^{1}: 718.2 km^{2} (277.3 sq mi)
- Elevation: 15 m (49 ft)
- Highest elevation: 1,090 m (3,580 ft)
- Lowest elevation: 0 m (0 ft)
- Population (2019): 1,803
  - Density: 2.510/km^{2} (6.502/sq mi)

Ethnic distribution
  - 2019 census: Kanaks 68% Europeans 10.37% Wallisians and Futunans 1.77% Mixed 14.31% Other 5.55%
- Time zone: UTC+11:00
- INSEE/Postal code: 98810 /98817
- ^{1} New Caledonia Land Register (DITTT) data, which exclude lakes and ponds larger than 1 km² (0.386 sq mi or 247 acres) as well as the estuaries of rivers.

Kaala-Gomen (French: [kala ɡɔmɛn]; Yuanga: Bwapanu) is a commune in the North Province of New Caledonia, an overseas territory of France in the Pacific Ocean. It is situated on RT1 and is approximately 18 km south of Koumac, 50 km north of Voh, and 365 km from Nouméa.

The name of the city comes from that of a mountain and from the Gomen tribe. The city was founded on its present site in 1899, with a committee appointed by the municipal government, which became an elected municipal council in 1961 and a fully-fledged commune in 1969.

Kaala-Gomen is also home to the village of Ouaco, known for its beef cannery of the same name and the nickel mines operated by the Mining Society of the South Pacific. The village can be visited on annual heritage days.

The commune is part of the customary area of Hoot ma Waap.

== Geography ==
The highest point in the commune is Ouazangou-Taom (1092 m).

Kaala-Gomen has a port, a lighthouse on the islet of Devered, an aerodrome, a television relay station in Wala and a racecourse in Ouaco.

The neighboring communes are:

- On the west coast: Koumac, Voh
- On the east coast: Ouégoa, Hienghene

== Toponymy ==
The Kanak name for the commune is Bwapanu, but Gömé is also occasionally used.

== Administrations ==
List of mayors
Term	Name	Party	Status
1961-1971	Raymond Clavier	Caledonian Union	
1971-1983	Gaston Jizdny		
1983-2014	Alain Levant	Independent, then FCCI, then independent	Honorary professor
2014-2020	Hervé Maguei Tein-Tauova	FLNKS-UC	
2020-2026	Alain Levant	independent	Honorary professor

== Population ==
Historical population
Year	Pop.	±%
2004	1,881	—
2009	1,931	+2.7%
2014	2,033	+5.3%
2019	1,803	−11.3%
