= Caac language =

Austronesian language spoken in New Caledonia

Caac
- Moenebeng
- caaàc
- Pronunciation: [caːac]
- Native to: Pouébo, New Caledonia
- Native speakers: 1,200 (2009 census)
- Language family: Austronesian: Malayo-Polynesian; Oceanic; Southern Oceanic; New Caledonian – Loyalties; New Caledonian; Northern New Caledonian; Extreme Northern; Caac

Language codes
- ISO 639-3: msq
- Glottolog: caac1237
- ELP: Caac
- Caac is classified as Vulnerable by the UNESCO Atlas of the World's Languages in Danger.

Caac or Caaàc, Caawac, Moenebeng, Mwelebeng is a Kanak language of northern New Caledonia. As of 2009, there were 1,170 reported speakers of Caac. The primary Caac-speaking population center is the village of Pouebo (or Pweevo in Caac), which is located on the northeastern coast of Grande Terre in the region of Hoot ma Waap. Caac is classified as an Extreme Northern New Caledonian language. Its closest linguistic relatives are also its closest geographic relatives which include Nêlêmwa-Nixumwak, Yuanga (also Yuaga) and Nyâlayu.

While most of the Caac-speaking people live in Hoot ma Waap, it is estimated that approximately 33% of the population live in the Nouméa region, largely in the Paita-Mont Dore area of the capital. The first Caac speakers arrived in Nouméa in the 1850s when Marist missionaries forced 120 people from Pouebo and Balade to accompany them to La Conception, the local designation for Paita-Mont Dore. This long historical separation between the groups has resulted in two Caac varieties. Differences have largely arisen in the phonology because of the southern variety's contact with the languages of southern New Caledonia, which have distinct phonological inventories from that in the north.

Reports tend to agree that Caac is threatened or vulnerable. Caac is largely only used with family and in social and customary contexts. Caac speakers are almost entirely multilingual minimally in Caac and French, though many also speak one or more of the neighboring languages. French plays a particularly heightened role in the lives of the Kanak people. It is the only official language of New Caledonia, despite the presence of 28 Kanak languages, and it is the language of media, government, public services, and education. As of 1998, the Kanak languages have been recognized as "languages of culture and education" by the Nouméa Accords. As a result, today, many Kanak languages are taught in schools, and their use in media is growing. Caac is no longer taught in schools, but in the 1980s and 90s it was taught in an alternative school that was organized by Caac speakers. More recently it was taught in a private secondary school. Despite efforts to incorporate Kanak languages into the curriculum, French remains paramount. As such, many speakers of Kanak languages, including Caac, are prioritizing French for their children so that they may be able to obtain an education and a good job. Because of this, young speakers have only a passive knowledge of Caac.

== Phonology ==
Caac has 27 consonant phonemes. Stops may be plain voiceless, aspirated, or prenasalized. The table contains both the IPA notation and the graphemes that correspond to the Caac orthography promoted by the Association Vaalija in Pouebo.

Caac Consonants
		Labio-velar	Bilabial	Alveolar	Palatal	Velar	Glottal
Nasal		mʷ ⟨mw⟩	m ⟨m⟩	n ⟨n⟩	ɲ ⟨ny⟩	ŋ ⟨ng⟩	
Stop	voiceless	pʷ ⟨pw⟩	p ⟨p⟩	t ⟨t⟩	c ⟨c⟩	k ⟨k⟩	
Stop	aspirated		pʰ ⟨ph⟩	tʰ ⟨th⟩	cʰ ⟨ch⟩	kʰ ⟨kh⟩	
Stop	prenasal	ᵐbʷ ⟨bw⟩	ᵐb ⟨b⟩	ⁿd ⟨d⟩	ⁿj ⟨j⟩	ⁿg ⟨g⟩	
Fricative		w ⟨w⟩ (Note: Cauchard 2018, p. 20 explicitly calls ⟨w⟩ a fricative.)	β ⟨v⟩	ð ⟨z⟩	j ⟨y⟩	ɣ ⟨x⟩	h ⟨h⟩
Trill				r ⟨r⟩			
Approximant				l ⟨l⟩			

Caac has a series of five vowels that contrast based on nasalization and length. Nasalized vowels occur more-rarely than oral vowels. Oral vowels phonetically nasalize in one of two instances: 1) when preceded by a labio-velar consonant (e.g., mwa [mʷã] 'house') and 2) when followed by a nasal or prenasal consonant (e.g., (h)ena tena [(h)ẽna tẽna] 'now'). There are also two central oral vowels that are restricted in their occurrence.

Caac Oral Vowels
	Front	Central	Back
Close	i	ʉ ⟨ü⟩	u
Mid	e	ø ⟨ö⟩	o
Open	a		

Caac Nasal Vowels
	Front	Central	Back
Close	ĩ ⟨î⟩		ũ ⟨û⟩
Mid	ẽ ⟨ê⟩		õ ⟨ô⟩
Open	ã ⟨â⟩		

== Grammar ==
Basic word order in Caac is VOS. However, when the subject is pronominal, it also occurs preverbally SVO.

SVO Word order

No na=da le thiin cele-n
1SG.S give=upward DEF letter at/to-3SG.POSS
'I send a letter to her windwards (in Nouméa).'

As is common among Oceanic languages, Caac distinguishes three persons and three degrees of plurality. It additionally distinguishes inclusive and exclusive first person dual and plural forms.

Subject pronouns
		SG	DU	PL
1	INCL	no	nyi	nya
1	EXCL	no	zi	za
2		zo	zi	re
3		i	za	ra
