= Zire language =

Extinct Austronesian language of New Caledonia

Zire
- Nerë, Sîchë
- Sîshëë
- Region: New Caledonia
- Native speakers: 19 (2009)
- Language family: Austronesian: Malayo-Polynesian; Oceanic; Southern Oceanic; New Caledonian – Loyalties; New Caledonian; Southern; South Southern; Zire–Tiri; Zire

Language codes
- ISO 639-3: sih
- Glottolog: zire1240
- ELP: Sîshëë
- Sishee is classified as Extinct by the UNESCO Atlas of the World's Languages in Danger.

Zire (Sîshëë), also known as Nerë, is an extinct Oceanic language of New Caledonia. There were 19 speakers in 2009. Zire is sometimes considered a dialect of Ajië.
