= Françoise Ozanne-Rivierre =

French linguist (1941–2007)

Françoise Ozanne-Rivierre (1941–2007) was a French linguist based at LACITO–CNRS, internationally known for her work on the languages of New Caledonia.

She completed her doctorate in linguistics in 1973, with a dissertation titled Le iaai, langue mélanésienne d'Ouvéa (Nouvelle-Calédonie), at Université Paris III, where she was a student of Haudricourt and Hagège. She became a member of the CNRS in 1972 and joined LACITO in 1976, where she remained until her retirement in 2006.

She published extensively on several New Caledonian languages, especially Iaai; the various languages of Hienghène (Fwâi, Pije, Jawe, Nemi); Fagauvea; and Nyelâyu. She was known for her work on Austronesian comparative linguistics, in particular for the application of the comparative method to the study of Oceanic languages.

Her husband, Jean-Claude Rivierre (1938-2018), was also a linguist working on the languages of New Caledonia.

== Selected publications ==
- Ozanne-Rivierre, Françoise (1976), Le Iaai : langue mélanésienne d'Ouvéa (Nouvelle-Calédonie). Phonologie, morphologie, esquisse syntaxique (in French), Paris: Société d'études linguistiques et anthropologiques de France.
- ——— (1984), Dictionnaire iaai (in French), Paris: Société d'études linguistiques et anthropologiques de France.
- ——— (2003), "L'aire coutumière iaai", in Cerquiligni, Bernard (ed.), Les Langues de France (in French), Paris: PUF.
- ——— (2004), "Spatial deixis in Iaai (Loyalty Islands)", in Senft, Gunter (ed.), Spatial deixis in Oceanic languages, Canberra: Pacific Linguistics.
