= WMN =

WMN may refer to:

- Maroantsetra Airport, Madagascar, IATA airport code
- Warminster railway station, Wiltshire, National Rail station code
- West Monkseaton Metro station, North Tyneside, Tyne and Wear Metro station code
- Wireless mesh network, a communications network made up of radio nodes organized in a mesh topology
- Waamwang language, ISO 639-3 code wmn
