= Arha =

Arha may be,

- Arha language
- See List of characters in Earthsea#Tenar
- The post-nominal letters used by Associates of the Royal Hibernian Academy
