= Ndrumbea language =

Austronesian language spoken in New Caledonia

Ndrumbea
- Naa Dubea
- Native to: New Caledonia
- Region: Southern tip outside Nouméa (Paita on the west coast, Ounia on the east coast)
- Native speakers: (2,000 cited 1996 census)
- Language family: Austronesian: Malayo-Polynesian; Oceanic; Southern Oceanic; New Caledonian – Loyalties; New Caledonian; Southern; Extreme Southern; Ndrumbea

Language codes
- ISO 639-3: duf
- Glottolog: dumb1241
- Ndrumbea is classified as Vulnerable by the UNESCO Atlas of the World's Languages in Danger.

Ndrumbea, variously spelled Dumbea, Ndumbea, Dubea, Drubea and Païta, is a New Caledonian language that gave its name to the capital of New Caledonia, Nouméa, and the neighboring town of Dumbéa; it is also spoken in the nearby region of Païta. It however has been displaced to villages outside the capital, with fewer than a thousand speakers remaining. Gordon (1995) estimates that there may only be two or three hundred. The Dubea are the people; the language has been called Naa Dubea (or more precisely Ṇã́ã Ṇḍùmbea) "language of Dubea".

Ndrumbea is one of the few Austronesian languages that is tonal, and it has a series of consonants that are also unusual for the region.

== Phonology ==
Ndrumbea, like its close relative Numèè, is a tonal language, with three contrasting tones, high, mid, and low.

=== Vowels ===
Ndrumbea has seven oral vowels, long and short. The mid front vowels are lower when short than long: /i e ɛ a o ʊ u/; /iː ɪː eː aː oː ʊː uː/. There are five nasal vowels, also long and short: /ĩ ẽ ã õ ũ/; /ĩː ẽː ãː õː ũː/. These interact with nasal consonants, described below. Back vowels do not occur after labialized consonants or /ŋ, ɣ/. In addition to the complementary correlation of nasal vowels with nasal consonants, nasal vowels do not occur after /j, ɽ, ɣ/. /ɣ/–oral vowel derives historically from ŋ–nasal vowel.

Phonetically, a stop–flap consonant cluster will be separated by an obscure epenthetic vowel with the quality of the following phonemic vowel.

	Front				Central				Back			
	oral		nasal		oral		nasal		oral		nasal	
	short	long	short	long	short	long	short	long	short	long	short	long
Close	i	iː	ĩ	ĩː					u	uː	ũ	ũː
Near-close		ɪː							ʊ	ʊː		
Close-mid	e	eː	ẽ	ẽː					o	oː	õ	õː
Open-mid	ɛ											
Open					a	aː	ã	ãː				

=== Consonants ===
Nasal vowels once contrasted after nasal consonants, as they still do in Numee. However, in Ndrumbea, nasal consonants partially denasalized before oral vowels, so that now prenasalized consonants precede oral vowels, and nasal consonants precede nasal vowels. Similarly, /j/ only occurs before oral vowels. This phenomenon is known as nasal harmony.

		Labial		Dental	Postalveolar		Velar	
		plain	labialized	Dental	apical	laminal	plain	labialized
Nasal		m ~ ᵐb	mʷ ~ ᵐbʷ	n̪ ~ ⁿd̪	ɳ ~ ᶯɖ	n̠ ~ ⁿd̠	ŋ ~ ᵑɡ	ŋʷ ~ ᵑɡʷ
Plosive	prenasal	m ~ ᵐb	mʷ ~ ᵐbʷ	n̪ ~ ⁿd̪	ɳ ~ ᶯɖ	n̠ ~ ⁿd̠	ŋ ~ ᵑɡ	ŋʷ ~ ᵑɡʷ
Plosive	voiceless	p	pʷ	t̪	ʈ	t̠	k	kʷ
Fricative		v					ɣ	
Approximant		v			ɽ ~ ɻ	j	ɣ	w

- Some sources also report [ɱ] as an allophone of /v/ before nasal vowels.
- The fricatives /v, ɣ/ are sometimes realized as approximants [ʋ, ɰ]. However, the approximants /w, j/ are never fricated.
- The nasal stop /n̠/ sometimes has incomplete closure, producing a nasalized approximant [ȷ̃].
- /ɽ/ is most often a tap [ɽ], sometimes an approximant [ɻ], and occasionally an alveolar tap [ɾ] or trill [r]. It does not occur word initially, and does not contrast with /ɳ/ word medially. It tends to be nasalized before a nasal vowel, [ɽ̃ ~ ɳ̆ ~ ɻ̃] with the nasality spreading to preceding vowels: /t̠ɽáɽẽ/ 'to run' has been recorded as [t̠^{á}ɽ̃ã́ɻ̃ẽ].

Ndrumbea contrasts three coronal places, articulated with the tip or blade of the tongue contacting the roof of the mouth: /t̪/, /ʈ/, /t̠/ and their nasal homologs. /ʈ/ is apical, in contrast to laminal /t̠/. It is not clear if /t̪/ is apico-dental or denti-alveolar, but it has a sharp release burst. /ʈ/, on the other hand, has a noisy release and approaches an affricate, [ʈᶳ]. It may actually be closer to an alveolar than post-alveolar, and appears to be enunciated more forcefully than /t̪/. /t̠/ also has a fricated release, and for many speakers this is longer than that of /ʈ/. All consonants labeled as Dental or Postalveolar (with the exception of /j/) are coronal consonants.

== Bibliography ==
- Gordon, Matthew; Ian Maddieson (October 1995). "The phonetics of Ndumbea". Fieldwork Studies of Targeted Languages III (91). UCLA Working Papers in Phonetics: 25–44.
- Hajek, John (2009). "Labiodental ɱ in Drubea". Oceanic Linguistics. 48 (2): 484–487. doi:10.1353/ol.0.0048.
- Rivierre, Jean-Claude (1973). Phonologie comparée des dialectes de l'extrême-sud de la Nouvelle Calédonie. Paris: Société d'études linguistiques et anthropologiques de Franc. p. 206.
- Shintani T. L. A. & Païta Y. (1990a) Grammaire de la langue de Païta. Nouméa: Sociéte d'Etudes Historiques de Nouvelle-Calédonie.
- Shintani T. L. A. & Païta Y. (1990b) Dictionnaire de la langue de Païta. Nouméa: Sociéte d'Etudes Historiques de Nouvelle-Calédonie.
- Wacalie, Fabrice (Dec 2020). "L'héritage de Jean-Claude Rivierre dans l'extrême sud de la Nouvelle-Calédonie". Journal de la société des océanistes (151): 263–270. doi:10.4000/jso.12223.
