= Pwaamèi language =

Austronesian language spoken in New Caledonia

Pwaamèi
- Native to: Voh, New Caledonia
- Native speakers: 290 (2009 census)
- Language family: Austronesian: Malayo-Polynesian; Oceanic; Southern Oceanic; New Caledonian – Loyalties; New Caledonian; Northern New Caledonian; North Northern; ?; Pwaamèi

Language codes
- ISO 639-3: pme
- Glottolog: pwaa1237
- ELP: Pwaamei
- Pwaamèi is classified as Definitely Endangered by the UNESCO Atlas of the World's Languages in Danger.

Pwaamèi (Poamei) is a Kanak language of New Caledonia, in the commune of Voh.
