= Paicî language =

Austronesian language spoken in New Caledonia

Paicî
- Native to: New Caledonia
- Region: East coast between Poindimié and Ponérihouen and inland valleys
- Native speakers: 7,300 (2009 census)
- Language family: Austronesian: Malayo-Polynesian; Oceanic; Southern Oceanic; New Caledonian – Loyalties; New Caledonian; Northern New Caledonian; Central Northern; Paicî

Language codes
- ISO 639-3: pri
- Glottolog: paic1239
- Paicî is not endangered according to the classification system of the UNESCO Atlas of the World's Languages in Danger

Paicî is an Austronesian language spoken in parts of New Caledonia. It is spoken in a band across the center of the island, in the communes of Poindimié, Ponérihouen, Koné and Poya.

== Phonology ==
Paicî has a rather simple inventory of consonants, in comparison to other languages of New Caledonia, however it contains an unprecedented number of nasal vowels. Paicî syllables are restricted to (C)V.

=== Consonants ===
		Bilabial		Post- alveolar	Palatal	Velar
		plain	labial	Post- alveolar	Palatal	Velar
Nasal		m	mʷ	n̠	ɲ	ŋ
Plosive	voiceless	p	pʷ	t̠	c	k
Plosive	prenasalized	ᵐb	ᵐbʷ	ⁿ̠d̠	ᶮɟ	ᵑɡ
Tap				ɾ̠		
Approximant				l̠	j	w

The palatal stops could be considered affricates because they occur with a heavily fricated release. The lateral and tap do not occur word-initially, except in a few loanwords and the prefix /ɾɜ/ they.

Because nasal stops are always followed by nasal vowels, but prenasalized stops are always followed by oral vowels, it might be argued that nasal and prenasalized stops are allophonic, which would reduce the Paicî consonant inventory to 13.

=== Vowels ===
Paicî has a symmetrical system of ten oral vowels, all found both long and short without any significant difference in quality, and seven nasal vowels, some of which may also be long and short. Because sequences of two short vowels may carry two tones but long vowels are restricted to carrying one tone, they appear to be phonemically long vowels rather than sequences.

Paicî vowel phonemes
	Front		Central		Back	
	Oral	Nasal	Oral	Nasal	Oral	Nasal
Close	i	ĩ	ɨ	ɨ̃	u	ũ
Close-mid	e	ɛ̃	ɘ	ɜ̃	o	ɔ̃
Open-mid	ɛ	ɛ̃	ɜ	ɜ̃	ɔ	ɔ̃
Open			a	ɐ̃		

=== Tones ===
Like its neighbour Cèmuhî, Paicî is one of the few Austronesian languages which have developed contrastive tone, involving three registers: high, mid, low. Additionally, there are vowels with no inherent tone, whose tone is determined by their environment. Words commonly have the same tone on all vowels, so tone may belong to the word rather than the syllable.
