= Tîrî language =

Oceanic language of New Caledonia

Tîrî
- Méa, Grand Couli
- Region: La Foa, New Caledonia
- Native speakers: 600 (2009 census)
- Language family: Austronesian: Malayo-Polynesian; Oceanic; Southern Oceanic; New Caledonian – Loyalties; New Caledonian; Southern; South Southern; Zire–Tiri; Tîrî

Language codes
- ISO 639-3: cir
- Glottolog: tiri1258
- ELP: Mea
- Tîrî is classified as Definitely Endangered by the UNESCO Atlas of the World's Languages in Danger.

Tiri (Ciri, Tĩrĩ), Tinrin or Mea (Ha Mea), is an Oceanic language of New Caledonia.

== Grammar ==
=== Pronouns and person marking ===
Tîrî has two types of pronouns: personal pronouns, which make reference to person, number and case, and impersonal pronouns, which only have one respective form and are more restricted in their use (Osumi, 1995, p. 38).

Like all other nominals in Tîrî, pronouns can occupy various positions throughout the clause (Osumi, 1995, p. 37). They may appear as the nominal subject of the verb, marked by the subject marker nrâ and agreeing in person and number with the subject pronoun in the predicate; the object of a verb; the object of a preposition; or the head of a predicate (Osumi, 1995, pp. 37–38).

When they appear within the verb phrase, personal pronouns show agreement in person and number with the nominal subject that optionally follows the predicate (Osumi, 1995, p. 38).

Tîrî personal pronouns (Osumi, 1995, p. 40)
			Free	Subject	Object/possessive
singular	1st person		nrô	u	rô
singular	2nd person		nrü	ke	nrü
singular	3rd person		nrî	nrâ	nrî
dual	1st person	inclusive	haru	ru	ru
dual	1st person	exclusive	komu	komu	komu
dual	2nd person		kou	kou	kou
dual	3rd person		nrorru	rru	rru
plural	1st person	inclusive	hari	ri	ri
plural	1st person	exclusive	kevi	kevi	kevi
plural	2nd person		wiri	wiri	wiri
plural	3rd person		nrorri	rri	rri

Personal pronouns in Tîrî also mark listener clusivity in the first person non-singular, and are generally used for human referents (Osumi, 1995, p. 39). The below example shows appropriate usage of the third person singular nrâ (not to be confused with the latter nrâ, which is acting as a subject marker for the optional nominal subject toni).

nrâ fi wai nrâ toni
3SG go already SM Tony
'Tony has gone.' (Osumi, 1995, p. 39)

Although the third person pronoun can be used for non-human entities (while the first and second person pronouns generally only refer to humans), speakers tend to use it in its singular form even when there is more than one referent, as seen below (Osumi, 1995, p. 39).

nrâ hô nrâ mêwe
3SG sing SM bird
'A bird (or birds) sang.' (Osumi, 1995, p. 39)

As indicated in the table above, Tîrî pronouns change form depending on whether they are being used as subjective, objective or free forms, the latter encompassing a variety of other pronoun usages, such as pronouns that have been topicalized and occur sentence-initially, as seen below (Osumi, 1995, pp. 39–40).

nrô u ta nrî u ta ô-nrî
1SG 1SG hit 3SG 1SG hit head-3SG
'Me, I hit him; I hit his head.' (Osumi, 1995, p. 40)

While they are classified as pronouns as they fill the subject pronoun slot, Tîrî's two impersonal pronouns show less flexibility than personal pronouns. They do not show any distinction for person or number and occur only in their respective forms of hêrrê and va, are unable to appear anywhere other than the subject pronoun position (the first element in the verb phrase), and are never followed by a nominal subject (Osumi, 1995, p. 41).

Speakers use hêrrê to refer to any number of unspecified entities when they do not wish to or are not concerned with specifying a referent as the agent of an action (Osumi, 1995, p. 41), as in the example below.

hêrrê hôdrô mwâ
IMPRS burn hut
'Someone burned the hut./The hut burned.' (Osumi, 1995, p. 41)

This contrasts with the below example, which is more likely to be used by a speaker who wishes to imply that a particular person has committed the same act (Osumi, 1995, p. 42).

nrâ hôdrô mwâ
3SG burn hut
'He burned the hut.' (Osumi, 1995, p. 42)

While hêrrê is typically used to refer to humans, the impersonal pronoun va is used similarly to refer to non-human referents, though this is not always the case (Osumi, 1995, p. 43). Va behaves much as the English pronouns it and that insofar as they can refer to both particular things (e.g. Did it bite you?; What's that over there?) as well as propositions (e.g. It's the truth.; That's a lie.), as demonstrated below (Osumi, 1995, p. 43).

va re radio
IMPRS ASS radio
'That must be a radio.' (Osumi, 1995, p. 43)

va see êrrê-havari
IMPRS NEG contents-true
'It is not true.' (Osumi, 1995, p. 43)

Subject pronouns may be used in conjunction with the tense-aspect markers ei 'future' and a 'perfect, actual, definite', in which case a number of pronouns may change their phonological form (see the below example, in which the second person singular ke has been combined with a) (Osumi, 1995, p. 170).

ka hara (nraasi) wai
2SG.PERF eat (rice) already
'You have already eaten (rice).' (Osumi, 1995, p. 173)

=== Possession ===
Tîrî, like most Oceanic languages, exhibits many types of possessive constructions, including possessive prepositions, possessive classifiers and bound-form nouns (Osumi, 1995, pp. 144). Classic possessive constructions involve two nominals that indicate the referent of one is possessed by the other. Tîrî has two types of possessive relationships, inalienable possession and alienable possession (Osumi, 1995, pp. 145). Inalienable possession describes an inherent relationship between two referents such as kinship, while alienable possession describes a non-inherent relationship such as temporary ownership or voluntary association (Osumi, 1995, pp. 145).

Summary of Possession in Tîrî (Osumi, 1995, pp. 155)
Poessive morpheme
Alienable Possession		Inalienable Possession	
Possessive Prepositions	Possessive Classifiers	Bound/ location/ poss.classifier	Link

==== Alienable possession ====
In Tîrî, alienable possession can occur in two ways. The first is when the noun possessed is followed by a possessive preposition and then by a pronominal or nominal processor (Osumi, 1995, pp. 145). The second is when the noun possessed occurs in apposition with a possessive classifier (Osumi, 1995, pp. 145).

===== Possessive prepositions =====
Prepositions are included in a closed set of grammatical words that are placed immediately before a noun phrase and express a syntactic relationship between the noun phrase and a predicate or another noun phrase (Osumi, 1995, pp. 145).

There are three possessive prepositional markers in Tiri: nrâ, rre/rrê, and ò and they occur between two nominals in the following structure.

NP_{(possessed)} nrâ, rre/rrê, ò NP_{(possessor)} (Osumi, 1995, p. 145).

Tîrî Possessive prepositional morphemes (Osumi, 1995, p. 145)
Possessive prepositional	Meaning
nrâ	Subject/possessive marker, 'of' Temporary ownership or voluntary relationship
rre/rrê	Variants of the same morpheme, possessive marker, 'of' Express personal possession
ò	Possessive marker, 'of' The use of fire for warming or cooking purposes

nrâ functions as both a subject and possessive marker when it precedes a noun phrase. As a possessive marker, it links the possessor to the preceding noun phrase, suggesting temporary possession (Osumi, 1995, p. 145). In Tîrî, the majority of nouns can occur with râ.

peci nrâ nrî
Paper POSS 3SG
'his paper' (Osumi, 1995, p. 145)

The possessive marker variants rre/rrê are restricted to the nouns, mwâ 'hut', wâ 'boat' and ò 'pot' (Osumi, 1995, p. 146).

mwâ rrê kevi
Hut POSS 1PL.EX
'our (not including you) hut' (Osumi, 1995, p. 146)

The possessed noun phrases that can occur with prepositions ò are limited to nre 'fire, firewood' or compounds with nre: mee-nre 'habitation', pwò-nre 'touch', and mwârrâ-nre 'fire flame' (Osumi, 1995, p. 147). The possessive relationship expressed by ò is related to fire, with the purpose of warming oneself or cooking something.

nre ò nrü
Fire POSS 2SG
'your fire' (Osumi, 1995, p. 147)

In these examples, the possessive prepositions, nrâ, rrê and ò are between two nominals, as in the structure above.

===== Possessive Classifiers =====
Another type of alienability is in constructions where the possessed nouns occur in apposition with a possessive classifier. Possessive classifiers are always either bound to pronominal or nominal possessors and they function to determine the nature of possession rather than to classify it (Osumi, 1995, p. 49). In Tîrî, unlike other languages, any noun can occur with a possessive classifier. They consist of the following: e-, ere-, hwee-, odho-, hwiie-, êê- and hêê- (Osumi, 1995, p. 49).

Table 3: Tîrî Possessive classifiers morphemes (Osumi, 1995, p. 50)
Possessive classifiers	Meanings
e-	Generally starches, to be eaten
ere-	Generally fruit, to be eaten
hwee-	General meat or egg, to be eaten
odho-	Things to be drunk
hwiie-	Things to be chewed
êê-	Plants growing on possessor's land, or to be planted
hêê-	Refers to something that belongs to the possessor by law or custom

In Tîrî, the possessive classifier can be placed before or after the noun possessed, as seen below (Osumi, 1995, p. 149).

NP _{(possessed)} POSS.CLASSIFIER NP _{(possessor)}

OR,

POSS.CLASSIFIER NP _{(possessor)} NP _{(possessed)}

Examples of the possessive classifier in between two NPs:

ppka hwee-nrî
pig meat-3SG
'his pork' (Osumi, 1995, p. 149)

arròò odho-beb
watch drink-baby
'baby's water' (Osumi, 1995, p. 149)

Examples of the possessive classifier preceding two NPs:

e-nrü u
food 2SG
'your (food) yam' (Osumi, 1995, p. 149)

ere-moo madre
fruit-man oranges
'man's oranges' (Osumi, 1995, p. 149)

==== Inalienable possession ====
Nouns that occur with inalienable possession are generally ones whose referents have no independent existence but are related to an entity (Osumi, 1995, p. 152). In Tiri, inalienable possession is the juxtaposition of two nouns in the following structure:

NP _{(possessed)} – NP _{(possessor)} (Osumi, 1995, p. 152).

===== Bound-form nouns =====
There are two types of bound-form nouns, bound nouns and link nouns. This class is inalienable as that the referents of the nouns are possessed in some inextricable way, for example, kinship and body parts. In most cases, the possessor has no control over the possession.

====== Bound nouns ======
Bound nouns are those that either has possessive pronoun suffixes or are bound to a nominal possessor (Osumi, 1995, p. 59). They include nouns referring to kinship, body or plants or other inanimate parts, secretions or of the body or plant, personal attributes or properties and the effects or origins of human affairs (Osumi, 1995, p. 153).

They can also be bound to another root either noun or verb, in compound constructions (Osumi, 1995, p. 59). For example of afiraa 'wife', where it is bound to the third person singular possessive nrî:

toni nrâ sùveharru afiraa-nrî
Tony 3SG love wife-3SG
'Tony loves his wife' (Osumi, 1995, p. 59)

Examples of Bound nouns (Osumi, 1995, p. 60)
External body parts of animals or humans		Secretions or body products of animals or humans	
ô	Head	tufârrî	Saliva
nrîfò	Mouth	fwîî	Excrement
hi	Leg	koo	Vomit

An example of the body part mouth with the first person singular rò:

nrîfò-rò
Mouth-1SG
'my mouth' (Osumi, 1995, p. 59)

====== Link nouns ======
Link nouns referents belong to similar categories of bound nouns such as kinship and body or plants or other inanimate parts. They are obligatorily linked to a pronoun or head of a pronominal phrase, where the possessive relationship is demonstrated by a link morpheme -nrâ- (Osumi, 1995, p. 62). The construction has this following form:

NP _{(possessed)} – nrâ _{(link)} – NP _{(possessor)} (Osumi, 1995, p. 154).

When the possessor is the first person singular, the link morpheme -nrâ- is often omitted as seen below.

panrea-rò
aunt-1SG
'my aunt' (Osumi, 1995, p. 62)

-nrâ- is also identical in form to the general possessive prepositions. Therefore, link nouns are alike to free common nouns that are followed by the possessive nrâ. Both constructions are difficult to differentiate, the link nouns depict inalienable possession and cannot be separated from their possessor by an element (Osumi, 1995, p. 154).

This subclass of nouns includes some from the words in the following list.

Examples of Link nouns (Osumi, 1995, p. 60).
External body parts of animals or humans		Secretions or body products of animals or humans	
ao	Cheek	kòfio	Perspiration
ôfaò	Horn (of cow)	nruâ	Dirt (of the body)
jawe	Tail	tòghòrrò	Boil

There can also be morphological complex link nouns, which involve a bound noun or a location noun in the first position, with the link noun in the second (Osumi, 1995, p. 64).

Although the examples represented are not comprehensive for both bound and link nouns, they show that there is no structural distinction between the two subclasses. Analysis of a Tîrî corpus by Midori Osumi (1995, p. 65) found that there were 33 bound nouns referring to external body parts compared to only five link nouns. This indicates that there are semantic differences between subclasses. For example, among the five link nouns is ao- 'cheek' is the only one that refers to external human body parts while others refer to external animal and insect parts (Osumi, 1995, p. 65). This shows that all external human body parts are bound nouns, except for ao- in Tîrî (Osumi, 1995, p. 65).
