= Numèè language =

Austronesian language spoken in New Caledonia

Numèè
- Kwényi
- Naa Numee
- Native to: New Caledonia
- Region: Nouméa, Isle of Pines
- Native speakers: 2,200 (2009 census)
- Language family: Austronesian: Malayo-Polynesian; Oceanic; Southern Oceanic; New Caledonian – Loyalties; New Caledonian; Southern; Extreme Southern; Numèè

Language codes
- ISO 639-3: kdk
- Glottolog: nume1242
- ELP: Numèè
- Numèè is not endangered according to the classification system of the UNESCO Atlas of the World's Languages in Danger

Numèè (Naa Numee, Naa-Wee), or Kwényi (Kwenyii), is a New Caledonian language, the one spoken at the southern tip of the island, as well as on the Isle of Pines offshore. Despite its name, it is probably not the language that gave its name to the capital of New Caledonia, Nouméa; that seems to have been its close relative Ndrumbea, which used to be spoken there.

== Phonology ==
Like its close relative Ndrumbea, Numèè is a tonal language, with three contrasting tones, high, mid, and low. The following data applies to the Kwênyii dialect.

=== Consonants ===
Kwênyii has 25 consonants.

		Labial		Alveolar	Retroflex	Palatal	Velar	
		plain	labial	Alveolar	Retroflex	Palatal	plain	labial
Nasal		m	mʷ	n	ɳ	ɲ	ŋ	ŋʷ
Plosive	voiceless	p	pʷ	t	ʈ	c	k	kʷ
Plosive	prenasal	ᵐb	ᵐbʷ	ⁿd	ᶯɖ	ᶮɟ	ᵑɡ	
Continuant		v			ɽ	j	ɣ	w

=== Vowels ===
Kwênyii has a total of 35 vowels, all monophthongs: 17 short, and 18 long.

	Front				Front rounded				Central				Back			
	oral		nasal		oral		nasal		oral		nasal		oral		nasal	
	short	long	short	long	short	long	short	long	short	long	short	long	short	long	short	long
Close	i	iː	ĩ	ĩː	y	yː	ỹ	ỹː					u	uː	ũ	ũː
Near-close		ɪː											ʊ	ʊː		
Close-mid	e	eː	ẽ	ẽː	ø	øː	ø̃	ø̃ː					o	oː	õ	õː
Open-mid	ɛ			ɛ̃ː					ə	əː						
Open									a	aː	ã	ãː				
