= Neku language =

Austronesian language spoken in New Caledonia

Neku
- Region: Bourail, New Caledonia
- Native speakers: 130 (2009 census)
- Language family: Austronesian: Malayo-Polynesian; Oceanic; Southern Oceanic; New Caledonian – Loyalties; New Caledonian; Southern; South Southern; Wailic; Neku

Language codes
- ISO 639-3: nek
- Glottolog: neku1237
- ELP: Neku
- Neku is classified as Severely Endangered by the UNESCO Atlas of the World's Languages in Danger.

Neku is an endangered Oceanic language of New Caledonia which is part of the Austronesian language family.
