= Xârâgurè language =

Austronesian language spoken in New Caledonia

Xârâgurè
- Native to: New Caledonia
- Region: Thio and Ouinane
- Native speakers: 760 (2009 census)
- Language family: Austronesian: Malayo-Polynesian; Oceanic; Southern Oceanic; New Caledonian – Loyalties; New Caledonian; Southern; South Southern; Xaracuu–Xaragure; Xârâgurè

Language codes
- ISO 639-3: axx
- Glottolog: xara1243
- Xârâgurè is classified as Vulnerable by the UNESCO Atlas of the World's Languages in Danger.

Xârâgurè ('Aragure, Haragure) is an Oceanic language of New Caledonia.
