= Cèmuhî language =

Austronesian language spoken in New Caledonia

Cèmuhî
- Wagap
- Native to: New Caledonia
- Region: Touho: east coast from Congouma to Wagap and inland valleys
- Native speakers: 2,600 (2009)
- Language family: Austronesian: Malayo-Polynesian; Oceanic; Southern Oceanic; New Caledonian – Loyalties; New Caledonian; Northern New Caledonian; Central Northern; Cèmuhî
- Writing system: Latin script

Language codes
- ISO 639-3: cam
- Glottolog: cemu1238
- Cèmuhî is not endangered according to the classification system of the UNESCO Atlas of the World's Languages in Danger

Cèmuhî (Camuhi, Camuki, Tyamuhi, Wagap) is an Oceanic language spoken on the island of New Caledonia, in the area of Poindimié, Koné, and Touho. The language has approximately 3,300 speakers and is considered a regional language of France.

Cèmuhî was studied by the French linguist Jean-Claude Rivierre.

== Phonology ==
=== Consonants ===
The consonants of Cèmuhî are shown in the table below.

Consonant phonemes
	labiovelar	labial	alveolar	palatal	velar	laryngeal
Voiceless stop	pʷ	p	t	c	k	
Prenasalized stop	ᵐbʷ	ᵐb	ⁿd	ᶮɟ	ᵑg	
Nasal	mʷ, h̃ʷ	m	n	ɲ	ŋ	h̃
Continuant	w		(r), l			(h)

Rivierre analyzes the contrasts of Cèmuhî along three emic categories: nasal, semi-nasal (i.e. prenasalized), and oral consonants. He uses the established term "labiovelar" (reproduced in the table) for what can be described more exactly as labial-velarized (protruded) bilabial consonants.

=== Vowels ===
The chart below shows Cèmuhî vowels, all of which can contrast in length. While all vowels are phonetically nasalized after a nasal consonant, only two nasal vowels are reported to be contrastive: /ɛ̃ ~ ã/ and /õ ~ ũ/.

Vowels
	oral		nasal	
	front	back	front	back
Close	i	u		õ ~ ũ
Close-mid	e	o		õ ~ ũ
Open-mid	ɛ	ɔ	ɛ̃ ~ ã	
Open	a		ɛ̃ ~ ã	

=== Tone ===
Like its neighbour Paicî, Cèmuhî is one of the few Austronesian languages which have developed contrastive tone. Tonogenesis in New Caledonian languages is hypothesized to have arisen from initial aspirated consonants. In turn these initial aspirated consonants would have arisen from initial geminate consonants, which originated in reduplication.

Unlike other New Caledonian tonal languages, Cèmuhî has three tonal registers: high, mid, and low tones.

== See also ==
- Northern New Caledonian languages

== Bibliography ==
- Rivierre, Jean-Claude (1972). "Les tons de la langue de Touho (Nouvelle-Calédonie) : Etude diachronique". Bulletin de la Société de Linguistique de Paris (in French). 67 (1): 301–316.
- —— (1980). La Langue de Touho : Phonologie et grammaire du Cèmuhî (Nouvelle-Calédonie) (in French). Paris: Société d'Etudes Linguistiques et Anthropologiques de France. p. 363.
- —— (1983). Dictionnaire cèmuhî – français, suivi d'un lexique français – cèmuhî (in French). Paris: Société d'Etudes Linguistiques et Anthropologiques de France. p. 375.
