= Nengone language =

Austronesian language spoken in New Caledonia

Nengone
- Region: Maré Island, New Caledonia
- Native speakers: 8,700 (2009 census)
- Language family: Austronesian: Malayo-Polynesian; Oceanic; Southern Oceanic; New Caledonian – Loyalties; Loyalty Islands; Nengone

Language codes
- ISO 639-3: nen
- Glottolog: neng1238
- Nengone is not endangered according to the classification system of the UNESCO Atlas of the World's Languages in Danger

Nengone is a language of the Loyalty Islands, New Caledonia.

== Phonology ==
The phonological inventory of consonants is atypically large for an Oceanic language. Many sounds which are allophones in other sub-families are distinct phonemes in the Nengone language:

Consonant sounds
		Labial	Dental	Alveolar	Retroflex	Palatal	Velar	Glottal
Plosive	voiceless	p		t	ʈ		k	ʔ
Plosive	voiced	b		d	ɖ		ɡ	
Affricate	voiceless					t͡ʃ		
Affricate	voiced					d͡ʒ		
Fricative	voiceless	(f)	θ	s		ʃ	(x)	h
Fricative	voiced			z			ɣ	
Nasal	voiceless	m̥		n̥			ŋ̊	
Nasal	voiced	m		n		ɲ	ŋ	
Rhotic				r				
Approximant	voiceless	w̥						
Approximant	voiced	w			ɭ	j		

Phonemes in parentheses only occur in words borrowed from other languages.

Vowel sounds
	Front	Back
High	i	u
Mid	e	o
Mid	ɛ	ɔ
Low	a	

== Sample text ==
Sample text in Nengone language and English translation below.

Ri hna whane Madaru nha popol' o re awe ne il' o re ten' o re aw. Ka hna hmore menu lu so ko re ten' o re aw, ka deko xeroen, ka nashene ko re pon' o re hnedrid. Ka ono re Uiewaieni Madaru ei nae jo omeloi ri pon' o re cele. Ka Madaru hna beredone, ko, Nerenebot, ile me nerenebot. Ka Madaru hna rowon' o re nerene, ko, roi, ilei Madaru me thube gonebot' o re nerene ne il' o re nashen. Ilei Madaru me ato yelen' o re nerene, ko, Rane, ka nubonengo se hna ato yelen' o re nashene, ko, Ridi. Ka ono re lakidi ne il' o re ore ko re rane me hna dan. Ilei Madaru me beredone, ko, Co numu gune me paupara ri nidin' o re ta cele, bane aithuani o re cele ne il' o re tin. Ilei Madaru me ilewan' o re gune me paupara, ne ci aithuani o re cele hadu ri ten' o re gune me paupara wene ri tini omeloi ri pon' o re gune me paupara, ile me onekoil. Ilei Madaru me ato yelen' o re gune me paupara, ko, Awe. Ka ono re lakidi ne il' o re ore ko re rane me rewon.

In the beginning God created heaven and earth. The earth was formless and empty, and darkness covered the deep water. The spirit of God was hovering over the water. Then God said, "Let there be light!" So there was light. God saw the light was good. So God separated the light from the darkness. God named the light "day", and the darkness he named "night". There was evening, then morning, the first day. Then God said, "Let there be a horizon in the middle of the water in order to separate the water". So God made the horizon and separated the water above and below the horizon. And so it was. God named what was above the horizon "sky". There was evening, then morning, a second day.

== Bibliography ==
- Tryon, D.T. and Dubois, M.J. Nengone dictionary. Part I: Nengone-English. C-9, viii + 452 pages. Pacific Linguistics, The Australian National University, 1969. doi:10.15144/PL-C9
- Tryon, D.T. and Dubois, M.J. Nengone dictionary. Part II: English-Nengone. C-23, iv + 205 pages. Pacific Linguistics, The Australian National University, 1971. doi:10.15144/PL-C23
