= Arhö language =

Austronesian language spoken in New Caledonia

Arhö
- Region: New Caledonia
- Ethnicity: 350 (2000?)
- Native speakers: (10 cited 2000)
- Language family: Austronesian: Malayo-Polynesian; Oceanic; Southern Oceanic; New Caledonian – Loyalties; New Caledonian; Southern; South Southern; Wailic; Arhö

Language codes
- ISO 639-3: aok
- Glottolog: arho1237
- ELP: Arhö
- Arhö is classified as Critically Endangered by the UNESCO Atlas of the World's Languages in Danger.

Arhö is a moribund Oceanic language of New Caledonia. In 2000, there were only 10 speakers of the language.
