= Orowe language =

Austronesian language spoken in New Caledonia

Orowe
- ʼÔrôê
- Region: Bourail, New Caledonia
- Native speakers: 490 (2009 census)
- Language family: Austronesian: Malayo-Polynesian; Oceanic; Southern Oceanic; New Caledonian – Loyalties; New Caledonian; Southern; South Southern; Wailic; Orowe

Language codes
- ISO 639-3: bpk
- Glottolog: orow1242
- ELP: 'Ôrôê
- Orowe is classified as Definitely Endangered by the UNESCO Atlas of the World's Languages in Danger.

Orowe (ʼÔrôê, Boewe, Neukaledonien) is an Oceanic language of New Caledonia.

== Phonology ==
The phonological inventry in Orowe contains 24 consonants and 16 vowels. There are 10 oral vowels and 6 nasal vowels.

The proposed orthographic symbols for each phoneme in the article are presented in angled brackets < >.

=== Consonants ===
		Labial	Labial velarized	Labiodental	Alveolar	Palatal	Velar	Velar labialized	Glottal
Plosive	voiceless	<p> /p/	<pw> /pʷ/		<t> /t/	<tj> /c/	<k> /k/	<kw> /kʷ/	<'> /ʔ/
Plosive	voiced	<b> /b/	<bw> /bʷ/		<d> /d/	<dj> /ɟ/	<g> /g/	<gw> /gʷ/	
Nasal		<m> /m/	<mw> /mʷ/		<n> /n/	<ny> /ɲ/	<ng> /ŋ/		
Fricative				<v> /v/			<gh> /ɣ/		
Approximant			<w> /w/			<j> /j/			
Liquid					<rr> /r/, <r> /ɾ/				

=== Vowels ===
==== Oral vowels ====
	Front	Central	Back
Close	<i> /i/	<ü> /y/	<u> /u/
Close mid	<e> /e/	<ù> /ø/	<o> /o/
Open mid	<è> /ɛ/	<ë> /ǝ/	<ò> /ɔ/
Open		<a> /a/	

==== Nasal vowels ====
	Front	Central	Back
Close	<î> /ĩ/	<ü̃>/ỹ/	<û> /ũ/
Close mid	<ê> /ẽ/		<ô> /õ/
Open		<â> /ã/	

== Bibliography ==
- Tsuji Emiko (2015) '"Ôrôê". In Toshihide Nakayama, Noboru Yoshioka, and Kosei Otsuka, eds.. Grammatical Sketches from the field 2. Tokyo: Research Institute for Languages and Cultures of Asia and Africa, Tokyo University of Foreign Studies. pp.1-31.
