= Hmwaveke language =

Austronesian language spoken in New Caledonia

Hmwaveke
- Native to: Voh, New Caledonia
- Native speakers: 200 (from 2009 census)
- Language family: Austronesian: Malayo-Polynesian; Oceanic; Southern Oceanic; New Caledonian – Loyalties; New Caledonian; Northern New Caledonian; North Northern; Hmwaveke languages; Hmwaveke

Language codes
- ISO 639-3: mrk
- Glottolog: hmwa1243
- ELP: Hmwaveke

Hmwaveke (’Moaveke) is a Kanak language of New Caledonia, in the commune of Voh.
