= Arhâ language =

Austronesian language spoken in New Caledonia

Arhâ
- Region: Poya, New Caledonia
- Native speakers: 170 (2009 census)
- Language family: Austronesian: Malayo-Polynesian; Oceanic; Southern Oceanic; New Caledonian – Loyalties; New Caledonian; Southern; South Southern; Wailic; Arhâ

Language codes
- ISO 639-3: aqr
- Glottolog: arha1237
- ELP: Arhâ
- Arhâ is classified as Critically Endangered by the UNESCO Atlas of the World's Languages in Danger.

Arhâ is a nearly extinct Oceanic language of New Caledonia.
