= Ouégoa =

Commune of New Caledonia

- Commune
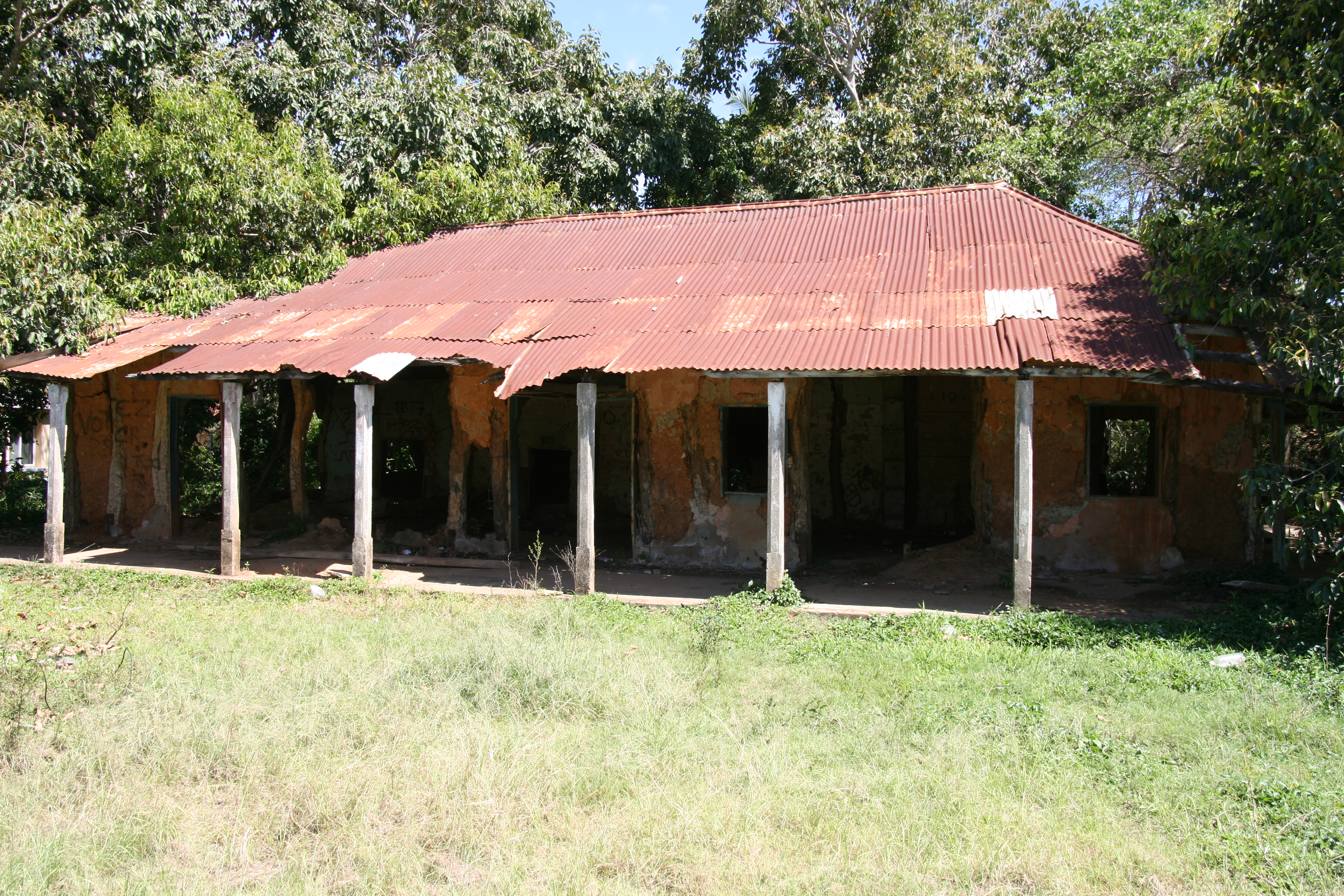
- The Commissariat de l'Or au Caillou became the Normandon Hotel in 1896

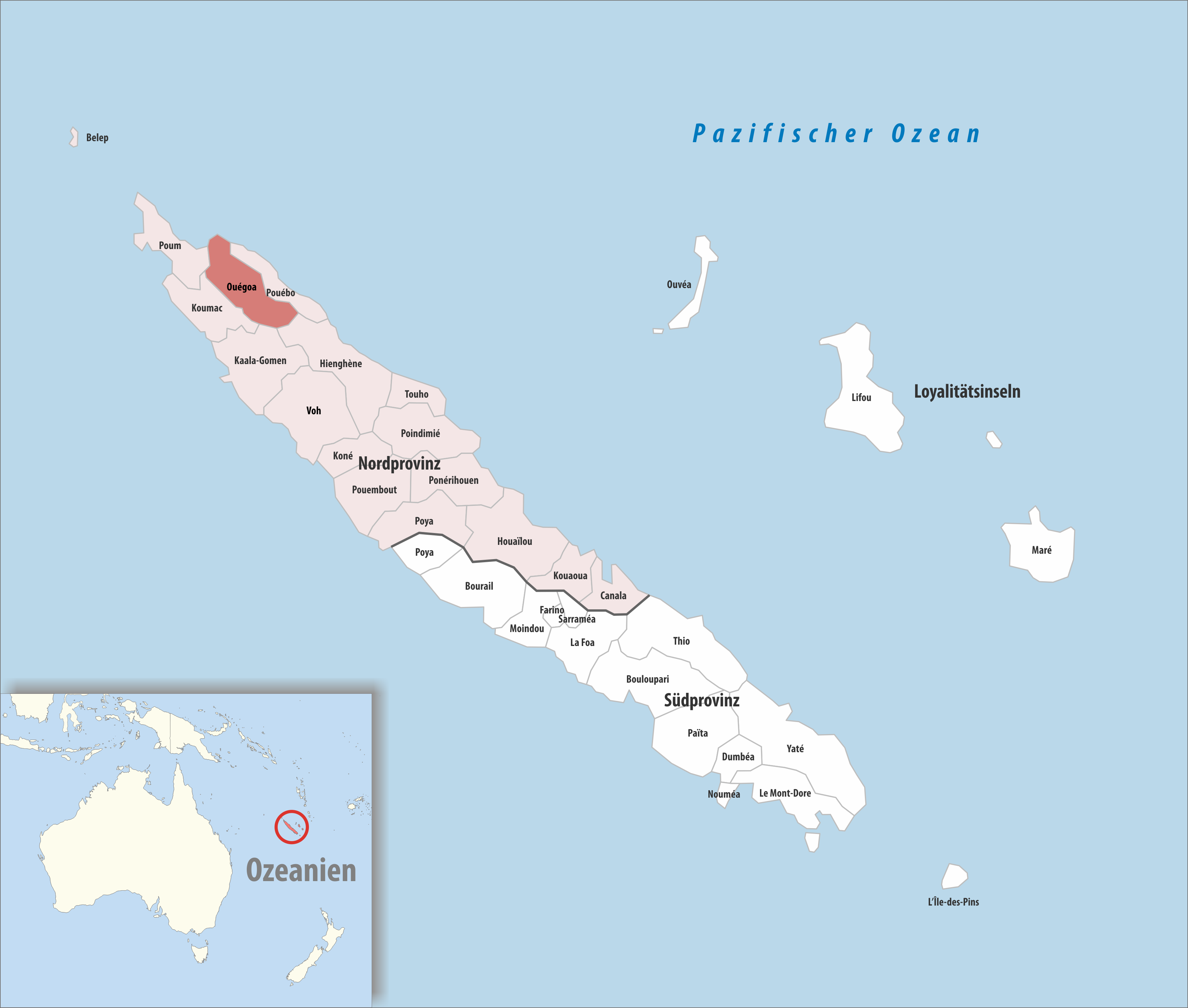
- Location of the commune (in red) within New Caledonia
- Location of Ouégoa
- Coordinates: 20°21′02″S 164°25′57″E
- Country: France
- Sui generis collectivity: New Caledonia
- Province: North Province

Government
  - Mayor (2020–2026): Barnabé Pébou-Hamène
- Area^{1}: 656.8 km^{2} (253.6 sq mi)
- Elevation: 10 m (33 ft)
- Highest elevation: 1,347 m (4,419 ft)
- Lowest elevation: 0 m (0 ft)
- Population (2019 census): 2,118
  - Density: 3.225/km^{2} (8.352/sq mi)

Ethnic distribution
  - 2019 census: Kanaks 71.48% Europeans 12.65% Wallisians and Futunans 0.19% Mixed 6.42% Other 9.25%
- Time zone: UTC+11:00
- INSEE/Postal code: 98819 /98821
- ^{1} New Caledonia Land Register (DITTT) data, which exclude lakes and ponds larger than 1 km² (0.386 sq mi or 247 acres) as well as the estuaries of rivers.

Ouégoa (French: [weɡɔa], Nyâlayu: Wégoa) is a commune in the North Province of New Caledonia, an overseas territory of France in the Pacific Ocean.
