= Fwâi language =

Austronesian language spoken in New Caledonia

Fwâi
- Native to: Hienghène, New Caledonia
- Native speakers: 1,900 (2009 census)
- Language family: Austronesian: Malayo-Polynesian; Oceanic; Southern Oceanic; New Caledonian – Loyalties; New Caledonian; Northern New Caledonian; North Northern; Nemi; Fwâi

Language codes
- ISO 639-3: fwa
- Glottolog: fwai1237
- Fwâi is classified as Vulnerable by the UNESCO Atlas of the World's Languages in Danger.

Fwâi (Poai) is a Kanak language of New Caledonia, spoken in the commune of Hienghène. In 2009, there were around 1,900 speakers of Fwâi. It’s considered a vulnerable language by the UNESCO Atlas of the World’s Languages in Danger.

== Phonology ==
=== Consonants ===
Consonants
		Bilabial		Labio- dental		Alveolar	Palatal	Velar	Glottal
		plain	lab.	plain	lab.	Alveolar	Palatal	Velar	Glottal
Stop	voiceless	(p)	(pʷ)			(t)	(c)	(k)	
Stop	aspirated	pʰ	pʰʷ			(tʰ)		(kʰ)	
Stop	prenasal	ᵐb	ᵐbʷ			ⁿd	ᶮɟ	ᵑɡ	
Fricative	voiceless	ɸ		(f)	(fʷ)	s			h
Fricative	voiced	β						ɣ	
Nasal	voiceless	m̥	m̥ʷ			n̥	ɲ̊		
Nasal	voiced	m	mʷ			n	ɲ	ŋ	
Approximant	voiceless	w̥				l̥	j̊		
Approximant	voiced	w				l	j		
Rhotic	voiceless					r̥			
Rhotic	voiced					r			

- Consonant sounds in parentheses occur either rarely, or from loanwords.

=== Vowels ===
Vowels
	Front	Central	Back
High	i ĩ		u ũ
Mid	e ẽ		o õ
Low		a ã	

== Bibliography ==
- Haudricourt, André-Georges; Ozanne-Rivierre, Françoise (1982). Dictionnaire thématique des langues de la région de Hienghène (Nouvelle-Calédonie) : pije, fwâi, nemi, jawe. Précédé d'une phonologie comparée des langues de Hienghène et du proto-océanien. Paris: Société d'Etudes Linguistiques et Anthropologiques de France. p. 285. ISBN 978-2852971349.
- Soon, Samantha (2022). Kwényï: A Sketch Grammar from a Historical Perspective. Sydney University.
