= Nemi language =

Austronesian language spoken in New Caledonia

Nemi
- Native to: Hienghène, New Caledonia
- Native speakers: 910 (2009 census)
- Language family: Austronesian: Malayo-Polynesian; Oceanic; Southern Oceanic; New Caledonian – Loyalties; New Caledonian; Northern New Caledonian; North Northern; Nemi languages; Nemi

Language codes
- ISO 639-3: nem
- Glottolog: nemi1240
- ELP: Nemi
- Nemi is classified as Definitely Endangered by the UNESCO Atlas of the World's Languages in Danger.

The Nemi language is a Kanak language of the Austronesian language family spoken by 320 people in the north of New Caledonia, in the commune of Hienghène. Dialects include Ouanga, Ouélis, and Kavatch.

Sample audio of spoken Nemi (intro and last part are French)

== Phonology ==
The phonology of Nemi is as follows:

=== Vowels ===
	Front		Central		Back	
	short	long	short	long	short	long
Close	i	iː			u	uː
Mid	e	eː			o	oː
Open			a	aː		

Vowels may be allophonically nasalized before prenasalized consonants and after nasal and postnasalized consonants. The vowel /u/ is fronted before /v/.

Lexical stress generally falls on the initial syllable.

=== Consonants ===
			Labio- velar	Labial	Apical	Palatal	Velar	Glottal
Nasal		voiceless	m̥ʷ	m̥	n̥	ɲ̊		
Nasal		voiced	mʷ	m	n	ɲ	ŋ	
Plosive	oral	tenuis	pʷ	p	t	c	k	
Plosive	oral	aspirated	(pʷʰ)	pʰ	tʰ		kʰ	
Plosive	nasal	prenasal	ᵐbʷ	ᵐb	ⁿd	ᶮɟ	ᵑɡ	
Plosive	nasal	postnasal	pᵐʷ	pᵐ	tⁿ	cᶮ	kᵑ	
Fricative		voiceless		f	s			
Fricative		voiced		v			ɣ (Note: Phonemic in medial position only.)	
Approximant	oral	voiceless	w̥		l̥ (Note: Rare in initial position.)	j̊		h
Approximant	oral	voiced	w		l	j		
Approximant	nasal	voiceless	w̥̃					h̃
Approximant	nasal	voiced	w̃					
Vibrant		voiced			r			

As is common in Oceanic linguistics, the term 'labiovelar' encompasses two classes of consonants: six velarized bilabial occlusives /ᵐbʷ, pᵐʷ, pʷ, (pʷʰ), mʷ, m̥ʷ/; and four labial–velar approximants w, w̥, w̃, w̥̃/.

The phoneme /s/ possibly corresponds to an etymological */cʰ/, a phonological gap.

Some speakers have a simplified inventory of consonants in medial position, with oral occlusives and voiceless continuants generally merging into voiced continuants and (in the case of alveolars) the vibrant, and postnasalized and voiceless nasal occlusives into voiced nasals, with the exception of loanwords. For those speakers, a similar allophonic free variation can also produce [k~ɣ], [t~r], and [tʰ~r̥] in initial positions in less careful speech.

In final position, only eight phonemes contrast: /m n ɲ ŋ p t c k/.

== Bibliography ==
- Haudricourt, André-Georges; Ozanne-Rivierre, Françoise (1982). Dictionnaire thématique des langues de la région de Hienghène (Nouvelle-Calédonie) : pije, fwâi, nemi, jawe. Précédé d'une phonologie comparée des langues de Hienghène et du proto-océanien. Paris: Société d'Etudes Linguistiques et Anthropologiques de France. p. 285. ISBN 978-2852971349.
