= Ajië language =

Austronesian language spoken in New Caledonia

Ajië
- Houailou
- Region: Houailou, New Caledonia
- Native speakers: 5,400 (2009 census)
- Language family: Austronesian: Malayo-Polynesian; Oceanic; Southern Oceanic; New Caledonian – Loyalties; New Caledonian; Southern; South Southern; Wailic; Ajië

Language codes
- ISO 639-3: aji
- Glottolog: ajie1238
- Ajië is not endangered according to the classification system of the UNESCO Atlas of the World's Languages in Danger

Ajië (also known as Houailou (Wailu), Wai, and A'jie) is an Oceanic language spoken in New Caledonia. It has approximately 4,000 speakers.

== Phonology ==
=== Consonants ===
		Labial		Alveolar		Palatal	Velar		Glottal
		nor.	lab.	Alveolar		Palatal	nor.	lab.	Glottal
Stop	voiceless	p	pʷ	t		c	k	kʷ	(ʔ)
Stop	prenasal	ᵐb	ᵐbʷ	ⁿd		ᶮɟ	ᵑɡ	ᵑɡʷ	
Nasal		m	mʷ	n		ɲ	ŋ		
Fricative		v	vʷ				ɣ		
Rhotic				ɾ	r				
Approximant				l		j		w	

A glottal stop only appears after oral vowels. Different speakers may realize /v/ as a bilabial sound /β/. Glide sounds [ɹ, ɻ] are heard as allophones of /r/.

=== Vowels ===
	Front	Central	Back	
High	i		ɯ	u
High-mid	e	ə	o	
Low-mid	ɛ		ʌ	ɔ
Low		a		

Glottalized vowels
	Front	Central	Back	
High	iˀ		ɯˀ	uˀ
High-mid	eˀ	əˀ	oˀ	
Low-mid	ɛˀ		ʌˀ	ɔˀ
Low		aˀ		

In addition to this, vowel length is phonetically distinct in Ajië, bringing an additional sixteen vowels for a total of forty-eight total vowels. Only the plain oral and nasal vowels are displayed for simplicity.

Nasal vowels
	Front	Central	Back	
High	ĩ		ɯ̃	ũ
High-mid	ẽ	ə̃	õ	
Low-mid	ɛ̃		ʌ̃	ɔ̃
Low		ã		
