= Waamwang language =

Austronesian language spoken in New Caledonia

Waamwang
- Native to: Voh, New Caledonia
- Extinct: (date missing)
- Language family: Austronesian: Malayo-Polynesian; Oceanic; Southern Oceanic; New Caledonian – Loyalties; New Caledonian; Northern New Caledonian; North Northern; Hmwaveke; Waamwang

Language codes
- ISO 639-3: wmn
- Glottolog: waam1236

Waamwang (Wamoang) is an extinct Kanak language of New Caledonia, in the commune of Voh.
