= Houaïlou =

Commune of New Caledonia

- Commune
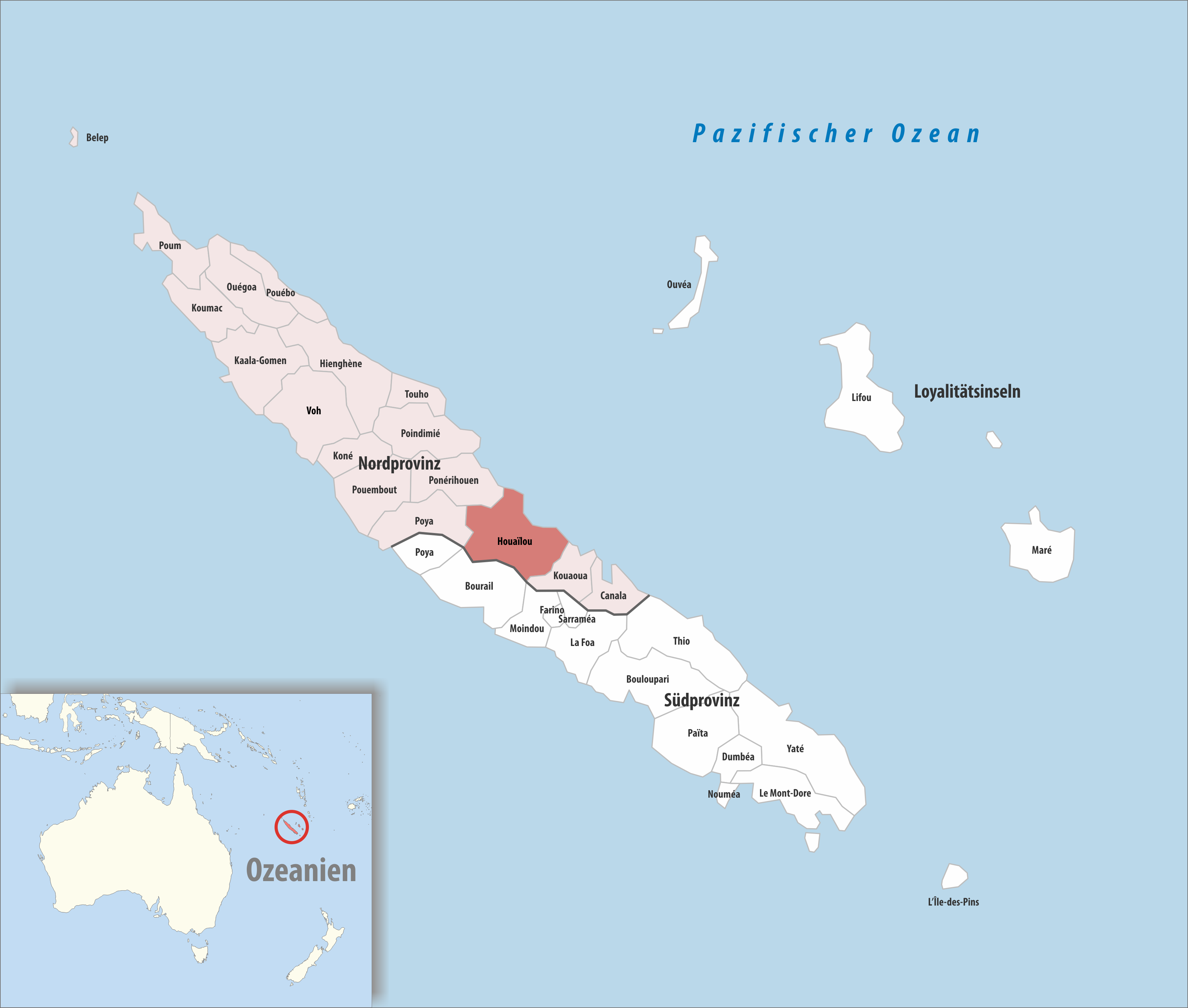
- Location of the commune (in red) within New Caledonia
- Location of Houaïlou
- Coordinates: 21°17′27″S 165°37′18″E
- Country: France
- Sui generis collectivity: New Caledonia
- Province: North Province

Government
  - Mayor (2020–2026): Pascal Sawa
- Area^{1}: 940.6 km^{2} (363.2 sq mi)
- Elevation: 5 m (16 ft)
- Highest elevation: 1,444 m (4,738 ft)
- Lowest elevation: 0 m (0 ft)
- Population (2019 census): 3,955
  - Density: 4.205/km^{2} (10.89/sq mi)

Ethnic distribution
  - 2019 census: Kanaks 89.58% Europeans 1.77% Wallisians and Futunans 0.33% Mixed 5.34% Other 2.98%
- Time zone: UTC+11:00
- INSEE/Postal code: 98808 /98816
- ^{1} New Caledonia Land Register (DITTT) data, which exclude lakes and ponds larger than 1 km² (0.386 sq mi or 247 acres) as well as the estuaries of rivers.

Houaïlou (French: [wajlu], Ajië: Waa Wi Lûû) is a commune in the North Province of New Caledonia, an overseas territory of France in the Pacific Ocean.

== Geography ==
=== Climate ===
Houaïlou has a tropical monsoon climate (Köppen climate classification Am). The average annual temperature in Houaïlou is 23.6 °C (74.5 °F). The average annual rainfall is 1,748.4 mm (68.83 in) with March as the wettest month. The temperatures are highest on average in February, at around 26.8 °C (80.2 °F), and lowest in August, at around 20.4 °C (68.7 °F). The highest temperature ever recorded in Houaïlou was 38.0 °C (100.4 °F) on 5 March 1952; the coldest temperature ever recorded was 7.0 °C (44.6 °F) on 3 August 1985.

Climate data for Houaïlou (1991−2020 normals, extremes 1952−present)
Month	Jan	Feb	Mar	Apr	May	Jun	Jul	Aug	Sep	Oct	Nov	Dec	Year
Record high °C (°F)	35.5 (95.9)	36.8 (98.2)	38.0 (100.4)	33.8 (92.8)	34.0 (93.2)	30.7 (87.3)	31.1 (88.0)	29.8 (85.6)	32.1 (89.8)	34.0 (93.2)	33.5 (92.3)	35.0 (95.0)	38.0 (100.4)
Mean daily maximum °C (°F)	30.2 (86.4)	30.6 (87.1)	30.2 (86.4)	29.1 (84.4)	27.5 (81.5)	26.1 (79.0)	25.4 (77.7)	25.2 (77.4)	26.2 (79.2)	27.3 (81.1)	28.2 (82.8)	29.5 (85.1)	28.0 (82.4)
Daily mean °C (°F)	26.2 (79.2)	26.8 (80.2)	26.3 (79.3)	24.9 (76.8)	23.1 (73.6)	21.6 (70.9)	20.6 (69.1)	20.4 (68.7)	21.4 (70.5)	22.8 (73.0)	23.9 (75.0)	25.5 (77.9)	23.6 (74.5)
Mean daily minimum °C (°F)	22.3 (72.1)	23.0 (73.4)	22.4 (72.3)	20.8 (69.4)	18.7 (65.7)	17.1 (62.8)	15.8 (60.4)	15.6 (60.1)	16.5 (61.7)	18.2 (64.8)	19.6 (67.3)	21.4 (70.5)	19.3 (66.7)
Record low °C (°F)	15.0 (59.0)	13.0 (55.4)	13.9 (57.0)	12.0 (53.6)	10.6 (51.1)	8.4 (47.1)	7.8 (46.0)	7.0 (44.6)	7.3 (45.1)	8.4 (47.1)	11.8 (53.2)	11.8 (53.2)	7.0 (44.6)
Average precipitation mm (inches)	222.0 (8.74)	263.3 (10.37)	287.0 (11.30)	166.5 (6.56)	135.6 (5.34)	106.2 (4.18)	94.3 (3.71)	80.6 (3.17)	58.2 (2.29)	57.6 (2.27)	106.9 (4.21)	170.2 (6.70)	1,748.4 (68.83)
Average precipitation days (≥ 1.0 mm)	13.7	14.6	14.5	11.1	9.1	8.0	6.1	6.4	6.0	6.9	7.9	11.6	115.9
Source: Météo-France

== Demographics ==
The town is part of the Ajië-Aro Kanak cultural grouping, and Ajië is the local language. Over 90% of the population identified as Kanak in the 2014 census. There are some European mine workers and farmers, and a small number of Polynesians, and Asian from different countries.

== Economy ==
The formal economy is based almost exclusively on nickel mining operations, with two local mines - Maï at Poro the Ballande mines at Bâ. Locals can train for mining jobs at the CFTMC in Poro. Service activities include the local administration and gendarmerie, schools, several small shops and other facilities.

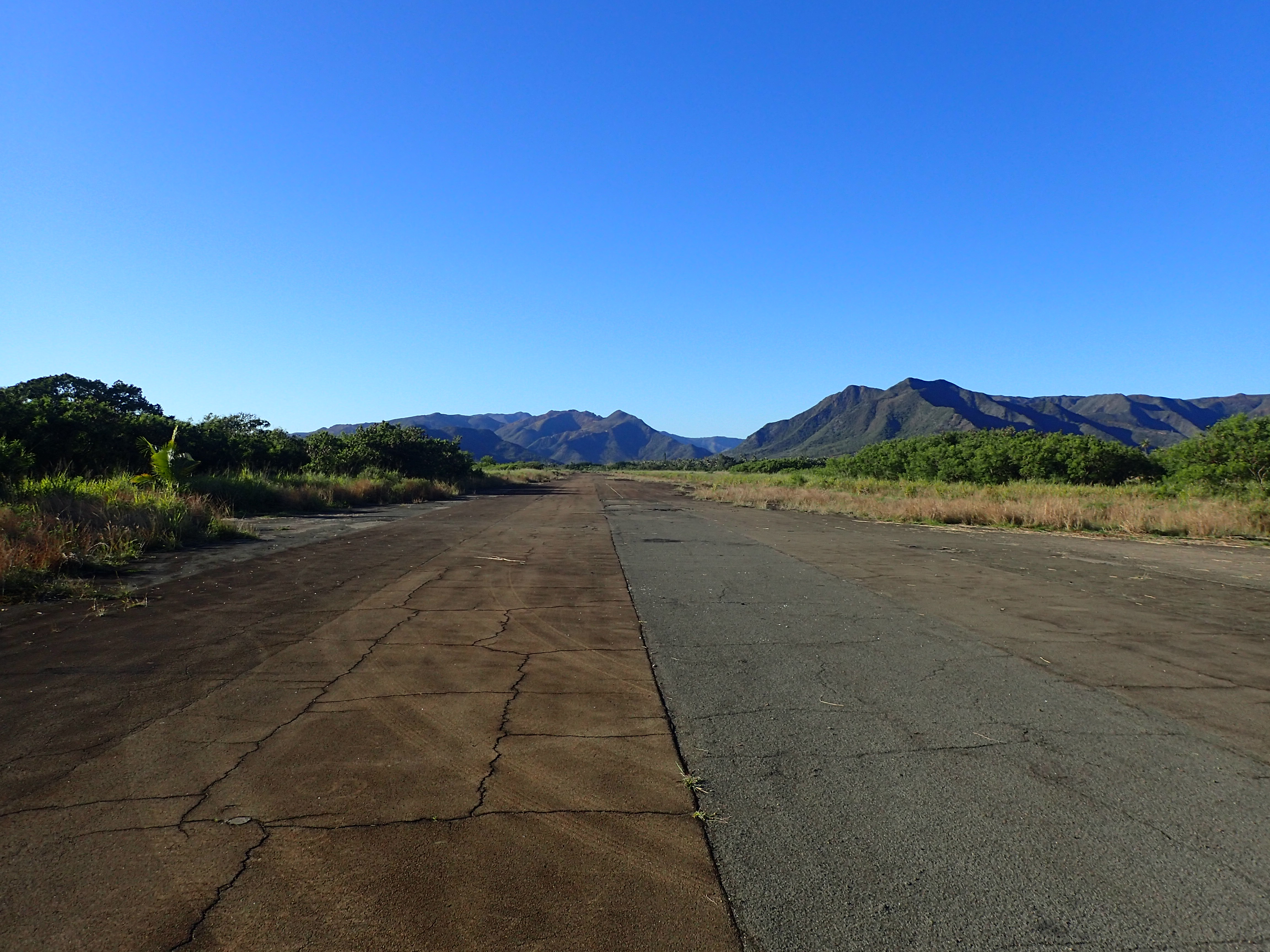
Houailou Runway New Caledonia

Local Kanak tribes have traditionally operated a semi subsistence economy, with some waged labour, migrant income, and substantial cultivation. Houaïlou's farmers produce Lychees, a fruit introduced by a colonist from Réunion, Jolimont Kabar. There is a Fête du letchi each December, although production is unreliable in this climate and the festival is sometimes cancelled.

== Notable people ==
- Georges Baudoux (1870-1949), author, lived in Houaïlou from 1928 to 1948
- Maurice Leenhardt (1878-1954), Protestant missionary, translator, and later anthropologist, built up the Protestant mission Dö Nèvâ 3 km upstream in the Houaïlou valley in 1902, and lived there until 1922.
- Delin Wéma, anti-independence Kanak politician. Minister of Education in the New Caledonia government, 1984–1985.
