= Kumak language =

Austronesian language spoken in New Caledonia

Kumak
- Nêlêmwa-Nixumwak
- Native to: Koumac and Poum, New Caledonia
- Native speakers: 1,100 (2009 census)
- Language family: Austronesian: Malayo-Polynesian; Oceanic; Southern Oceanic; New Caledonian – Loyalties; New Caledonian; Northern New Caledonian; Extreme Northern; Kumak
- Dialects: Nêlêmwa (Nenema); Nixumwak (Kumak)

Language codes
- ISO 639-3: nee
- Glottolog: kuma1276
- Kumak is classified as Vulnerable by the UNESCO Atlas of the World's Languages in Danger.

Kumak, also known as Nêlêmwa-Nixumwak after its two dialects, is a Kanak language of northern New Caledonia.
