= Pwapwâ language =

Austronesian language spoken in New Caledonia

Pwapwa
- Native to: Voh, New Caledonia
- Native speakers: 40 (2006 census)
- Language family: Austronesian: Malayo-Polynesian; Oceanic; Southern Oceanic; New Caledonian – Loyalties; New Caledonian; Northern New Caledonian; North Northern; ?; Pwapwa

Language codes
- ISO 639-3: pop
- Glottolog: pwap1237
- ELP: Pwapwâ
- Pwapwâ is classified as Severely Endangered by the UNESCO Atlas of the World's Languages in Danger.

Pwapwa (also known as Poapoa or Neukaledonien) is a nearly extinct New Caledonian language of New Caledonia, in the commune of Voh.
