= Pije language =

Austronesian language spoken in New Caledonia

Pije
- Native to: Hienghène, New Caledonia
- Native speakers: 180 (2009 census)
- Language family: Austronesian: Malayo-Polynesian; Oceanic; Southern Oceanic; New Caledonian – Loyalties; New Caledonian; Northern New Caledonian; North Northern; Nemi; Pije

Language codes
- ISO 639-3: piz
- Glottolog: pije1237
- ELP: Pije
- {Pije is classified as Severely Endangered by the UNESCO Atlas of the World's Languages in Danger.

Pije (Pinje) is a Kanak language of New Caledonia, in the commune of Hienghène.

== Bibliography ==
- Haudricourt, André-Georges; Ozanne-Rivierre, Françoise (1982). Dictionnaire thématique des langues de la région de Hienghène (Nouvelle-Calédonie) : pije, fwâi, nemi, jawe. Précédé d'une phonologie comparée des langues de Hienghène et du proto-océanien. Paris: Société d'Etudes Linguistiques et Anthropologiques de France. p. 285. ISBN 978-2852971349.
