= Haveke language =

Austronesian language spoken in New Caledonia

Haveke
- Native to: Voh, New Caledonia
- Native speakers: 450 (from 2009)
- Language family: Austronesian: Malayo-Polynesian; Oceanic; Southern Oceanic; New Caledonian – Loyalties; New Caledonian; Northern New Caledonian; North Northern; Hmwaveke; Haveke

Language codes
- ISO 639-3: Either: hvk – Haveke bwa – Bwatoo
- Glottolog: have1241 Haveke bwat1240 Bwatoo
- ELP: Haveke
- Bwatoo
- The Voh-Koné dialects are classified as Definitely Endangered by the UNESCO Atlas of the World's Languages in Danger.

Haveke (also known as Aveke or 'Aveke) is a Kanak language of New Caledonia, in the commune of Voh. Bwatoo dialect is distinct.

The language is considered endangered with 300 native speakers worldwide reported in 1982. That number gets lower due to the expansion of French in New Caledonia. There are virtually no children speakers of Havake.
