= Nyâlayu language =

Austronesian language spoken in New Caledonia

Nyelâyu
- Pronunciation: [jãlɑjʊ]
- Native to: New Caledonia
- Native speakers: 2,000 (2009 census)
- Language family: Austronesian: Malayo-Polynesian; Oceanic; Southern Oceanic; New Caledonian – Loyalties; New Caledonian; Northern New Caledonian; Extreme Northern; Nyelâyu
- Dialects: Tiari-Balade; Belep; Arama

Language codes
- ISO 639-3: yly
- Glottolog: nyal1254 Nyalayu/Belep bala1316 Balade
- ELP: Belep
- Nyâlayu is not endangered according to the classification system of the UNESCO Atlas of the World's Languages in Danger

Nyelâyu (Yâlayu), also known as Nyalâyu, is a Kanak language of northern New Caledonia, spoken by approximately 2,000 speakers. There are two dialects that are not mutually intelligible. Pooc (or Haat) is spoken in the Belep islands, which are located just north of Grande Terre. Puma (or Paak or Ovac) is spoken in the northernmost regions of New Caledonia in the areas around Poum in the west and Pouébo and Balade in the east.

== Phonology ==
=== Consonants ===
		Labiovelar	Bilabial	Alveolar	Palatal	Velar	Glottal
Stops	plain	pʷ	p	t	c	k	
Stops	aspirated	pʰʷ	pʰ	tʰ	cʰ	kʰ	
Stops	prenasalized	ᵐbʷ	ᵐb	ⁿd	ᶮɟ	ᵑg	
Nasals	plain	mʷ	m	n	ɲ	ŋ	
Nasals	aspirated	mʰʷ	mʰ	nʰ	ɲʰ		
Fricatives			β			ɣ (x)	h
Semivowels	plain		w		j		
Semivowels	aspirated		wʰ		jʰ		
Trill				r			
Laterals				l lʰ l᷉			

Voiceless stops, nasals, and approximants exhibit a contrast of aspiration exhibited in the following examples.

- pe [pe] "ray fish" || phe [pʰe] "sharpening stone"
- teec [teec] "scorching" || theec [tʰeec] "washed up"
- nu [nu] "coconut palm" || nhu [nʰu] "hot"

Aspirated consonants are very subtly marked. Aspiration seems to be a prosodic trait that affects the overall realization of the syllable by lowering the register of the voice.

=== Vowels ===
Oral Vowels
	Front	Central	Back
High	i (y) iː		u uː
Mid	e (ø) eː		o oː
Open	a aː		

Nasal Vowels
	Front	Central	Back
High	ĩ ĩː		ũ ũː
Mid	ẽ ẽː		õ õː
Open	ã ãː		

The vowels /y/ and /ø/ are in parentheses, because they are very rare and appear only in a few words.
