= Yuanga language =

Austronesian language spoken in New Caledonia

Yuanga
- Native to: New Caledonia
- Region: Nouméa, Isle of Pines
- Native speakers: 2,400 (2009 census)
- Language family: Austronesian: Malayo-Polynesian; Oceanic; Southern Oceanic; New Caledonian – Loyalties; New Caledonian; Northern; Extreme Northern; Yuanga

Language codes
- ISO 639-3: nua
- Glottolog: yuag1237
- Yuanga is not endangered according to the classification system of the UNESCO Atlas of the World's Languages in Danger

Yuanga (Yuaga), or Nua, is a New Caledonian language spoken in the north of the island.

== Phonology ==
=== Consonants ===
		Labial		Dental/ Alveolar		Retroflex	Palatal	Velar	Glottal
		plain	lab.	plain	pal.	Retroflex	Palatal	Velar	Glottal
Stop	voiceless	p	pʷ	t̪	tʲ	ʈ		k	
Stop	aspirated	pʰ	pʰʷ	t̪ʰ	tʲʰ	ʈʰ		kʰ	
Stop	prenasal	ᵐb	ᵐbʷ	ⁿ̪d̪	ⁿdʲ	ᶯɖ		ᵑɡ	
Fricative	plain	v		θ				x	h
Fricative	aspirated	vʰ							
Nasal	voiced	m	mʷ	n̪	nʲ			ŋ	
Nasal	aspirated	mʰ	mʰʷ	n̪ʰ	nʲʰ				
Approximant	voiced	w		l			j		
Approximant	aspirated	wʰ		(lʰ)			jʰ		

- [lʰ] is probably not a distinct phoneme, although it is perhaps perceived and heard among a few speakers.
- Stops /p, pʷ, t̪, tʲ/ may have voiced realizations [b, bʷ, d̪, dʲ] when in intervocalic position.
- /ʈ/ may be heard as voiced [ɖ] or a flapped [ɾ] in intervocalic position.
- /k/ in intervocalic position may be realized as a stop [ɡ] or fricated as either [ɣ] or [x].
- /vʰ/ may also be heard as voiceless [fʰ] in free variation.
- /θ, x/ may be voiced as [ð, ɣ] in intervocalic position.

=== Vowels ===
	Front	Central	Back
High	i ĩ		u ũ
High-mid	e ẽ		o õ
Low-mid	ɛ		ɔ
Low		a ã	

- /e/ may be heard as [ɪ] when following palatalized stops.
- /o/ may be heard as [ʊ] in free variation following consonants other than labio-velar stops.
- /ɔ/ is more closed as [ɔ̝] when following labio-velar stops and labio-velar nasals.
