= Poum =

Commune of New Caledonia

- Commune
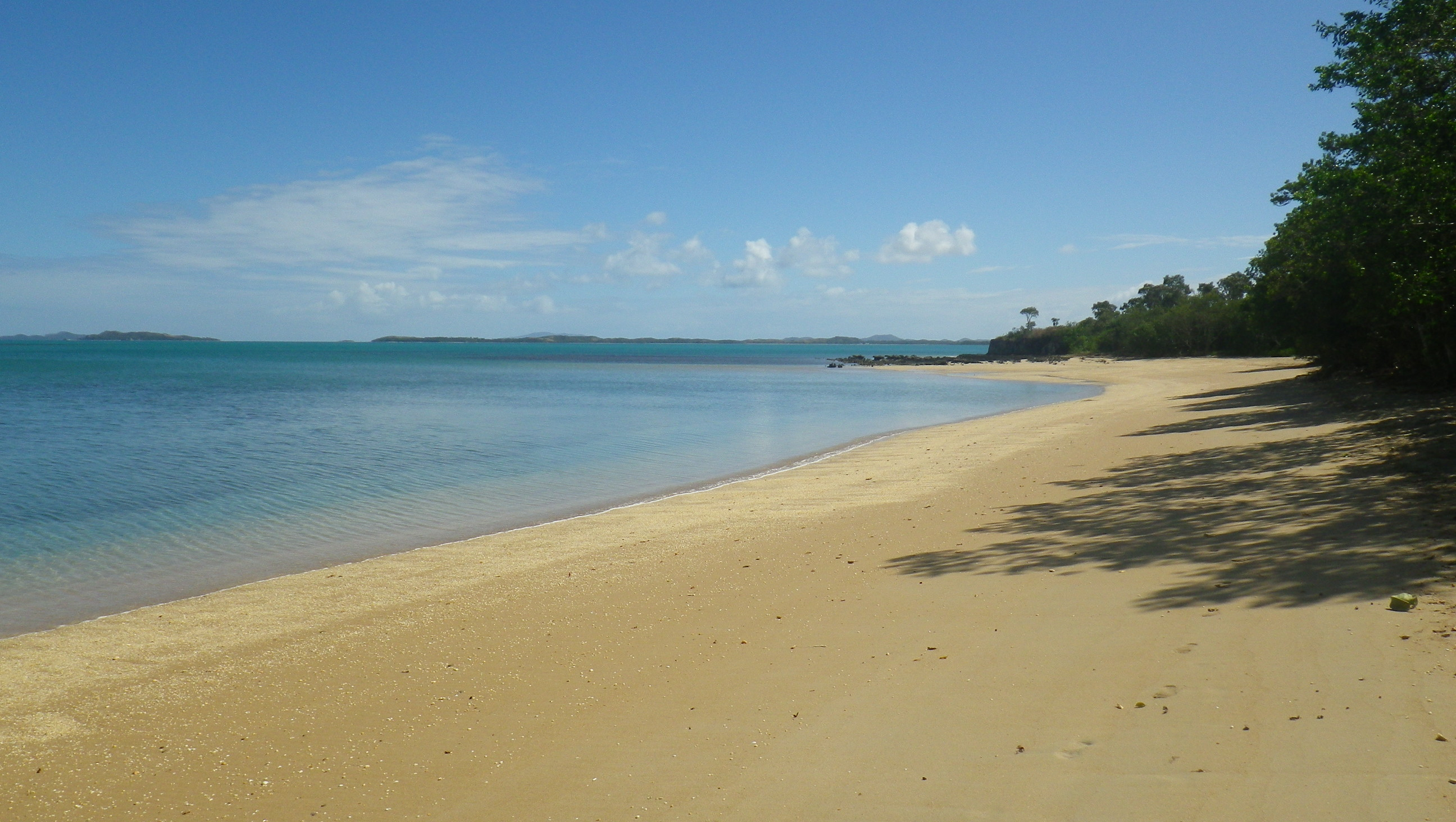
- Nennon Beach in Poum

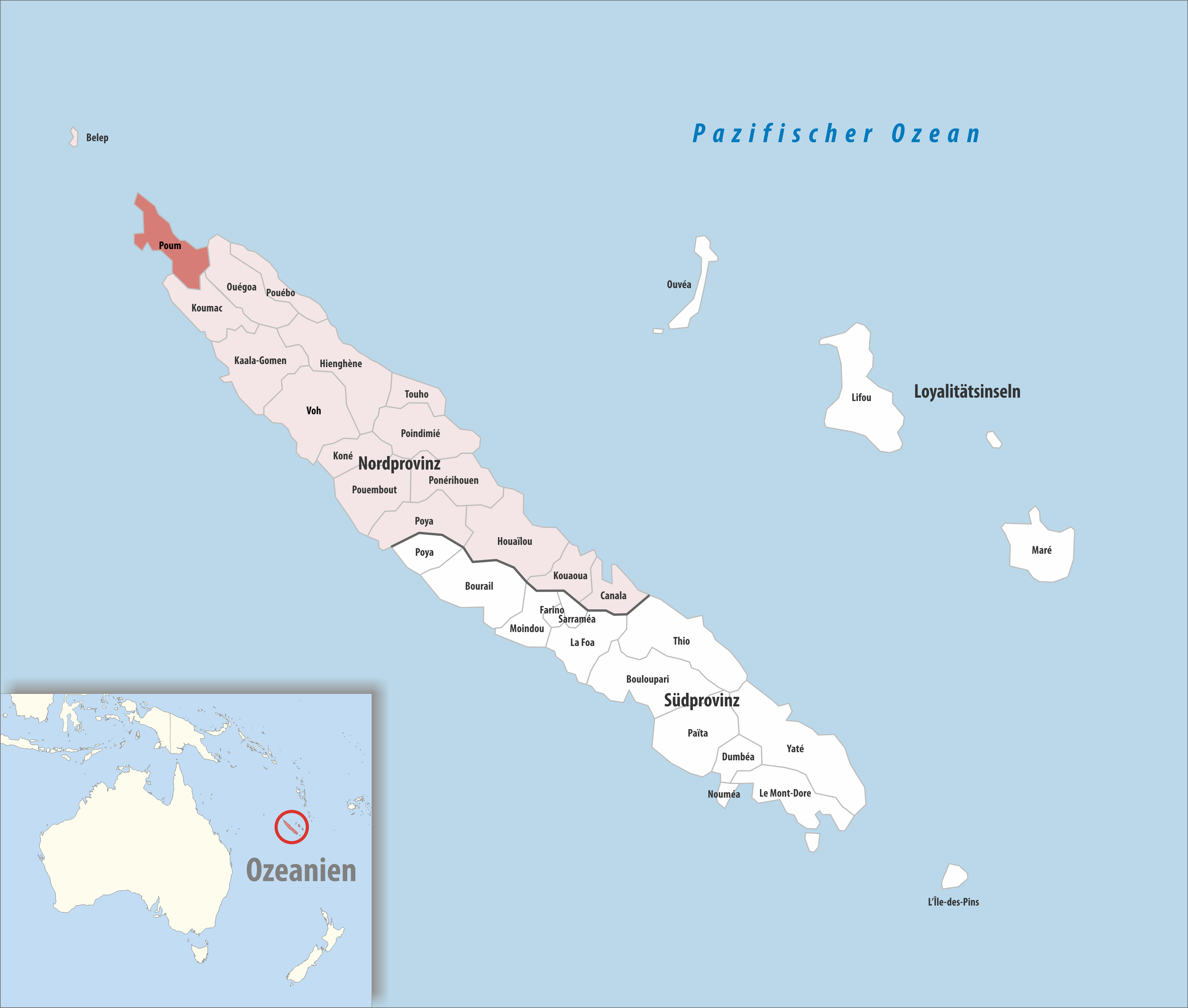
- Location of the commune (in red) within New Caledonia
- Location of Poum
- Coordinates: 20°14′29″S 164°01′01″E
- Country: France
- Sui generis collectivity: New Caledonia
- Province: North Province

Government
  - Mayor (2020–2026): Henriette Tidjine-Hmae
- Area^{1}: 469.4 km^{2} (181.2 sq mi)
- Elevation: 5 m (16 ft)
- Highest elevation: 412 m (1,352 ft)
- Lowest elevation: 0 m (0 ft)
- Population (2019 census): 1,435
  - Density: 3.057/km^{2} (7.918/sq mi)

Ethnic distribution
  - 2019 census: Kanaks 82.72% Europeans 6.34% Wallisians and Futunans 0.35% Mixed 5.51% Other 5.09%
- Time zone: UTC+11:00
- INSEE/Postal code: 98826 /98826
- ^{1} New Caledonia Land Register (DITTT) data, which exclude lakes and ponds larger than 1 km² (0.386 sq mi or 247 acres) as well as the estuaries of rivers.

Poum (French: [pum], Nyâlayu: Pum) is a commune in the North Province of New Caledonia, an overseas territory of France in the Pacific Ocean. The small town of Poum (Latitude: 20° 13' 59 south, longitude: 164° 1' 23 east) is located in the far northwest, located on the southern part of Banare Bay, with Mouac Island just offshore. Aside from French, the native language of the Kanak inhabitants is nêlêmwa-nixumwak, an Austronesian language spoken by about 1,100 people. British fishermen came to the islands in 1855 seeking sea cucumbers, and settled and intermarried, and this is reflected in the last names of some clan members and on gravestones (e.g. Williams, Winchester). In the 1850s, a hundred Europeans lived on Mouac Island and John Henry Williams established a presence on Néba island.

== Geography ==
The Poum massif south of Poum and Titch rises to 414 m and is rich in nickel. Other minerals like cobalt have been mined out. The hills around Poum are bare of trees and distinctively rose and red-tinged. Seasonal water shortages and bush fires are common.

== Economy ==
There is one boarding middle school near Poum village. The Kanak population pursue diverse subsistence activities, sometimes combined with paid work. There is one service station and store, opened in the 2010s but believed closed in 2023. Tourists can stay at a western style hotel complex, the Malabou Beach hotel on Nehoue Bay, which is owned by the Northern Province corporation, Grands Hôtels - it has 35 employees. There are also two tourist cottages (Golone and Poingam), a campsite (Pagop), luxury cabins north at Boat Pass at the Beach House Lodge, and home stays are also possible.

Fishing is still pursued mainly by the islanders, especially from Tiabet, although commercial fish sales are affected by the long distances to market in Nouméa and accreditation systems. Agriculture is practised, and there is some European-owned cattle ranching.

The Poum nickel mine was not heavily exploited fully for many years following its acquisition by SLN after the Accords de Bercy in the 1990s, and had about thirty employees in 2014. In 2015, plans to increase production to 100,000 tonnes of ore per year from 'Spur A' of the mine, with 2.5% nickel content, were announced. In 2019, a further announcement of increased production was made. The mine has been accused by the inhabitants of Titch, west of Poum centre, of creating water pollution problems. SLN's production ended in 2023, suspending operations.

A local haulage and navigation company, Sonarep (Société de navigation et de Roulage de Poum) was heavily involved in the mine and loading ores onto boats via a small wharf it wanted to extend, employing many local people. It was established by Raphaël Pidjot and Raymond Bwauva-Kaleba, chief of the Titch tribe and first mayor of the municipality, as a local enterprise in the 1990s owned by the clans and 260 people from the surrounding tribes and islets. Relations were often poor with SLN. In 2023 Sonarep was declared bankrupt in the commercial court of Nouméa and ceased operations. Investigations by the Gendarmerie discovered massive embezzlement and misuse of funds, some using interlinked companies. Details were released in 2024 and named former director Victor Toulangui in an investigation into missing funds from the rapid sale of three barges that cost US$3m to build, and suspicion also fell on an associate, David Guyonnet.
