= Pouébo =

Commune of New Caledonia

- Commune
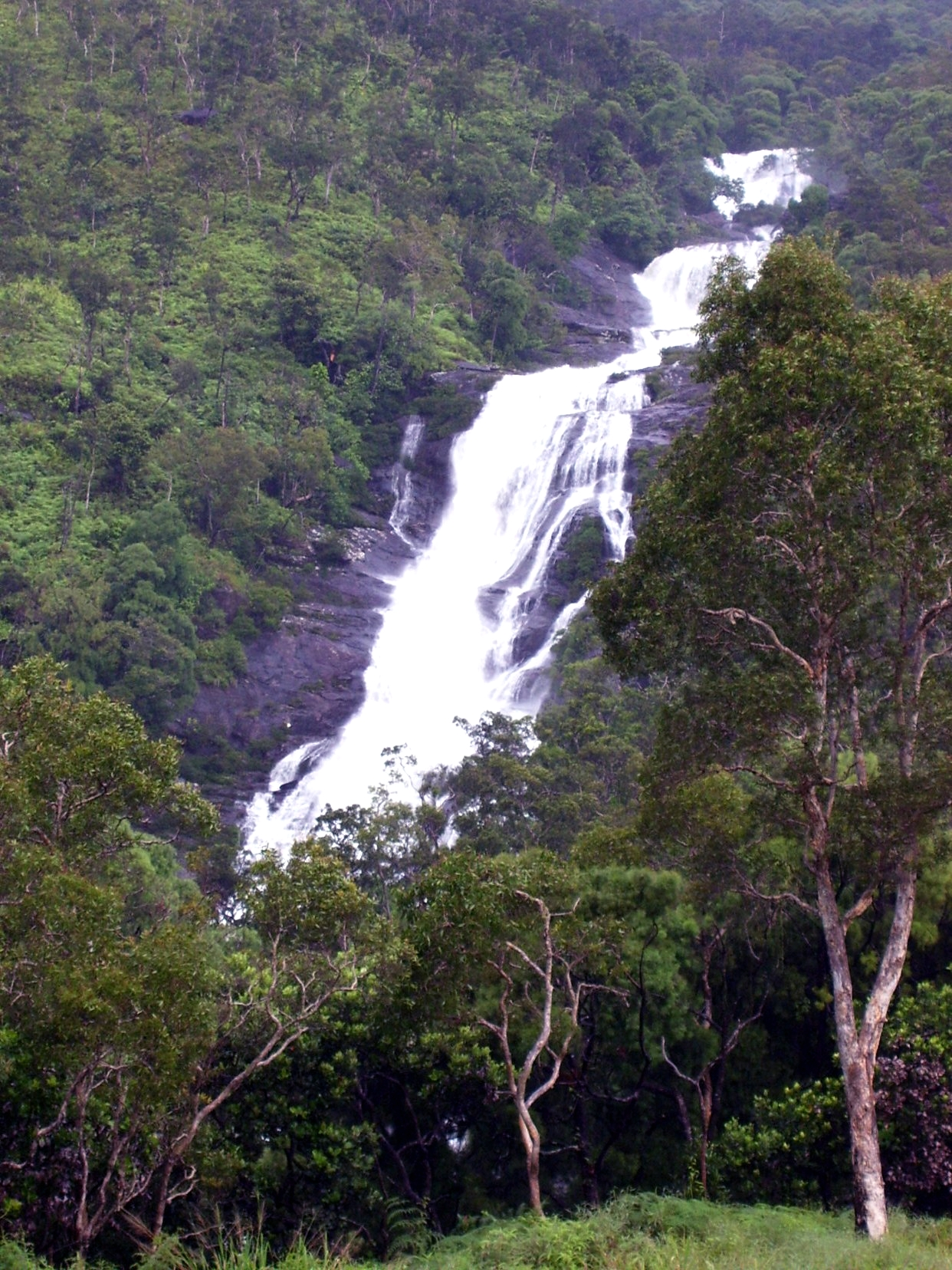
- The Cascade de Colnett

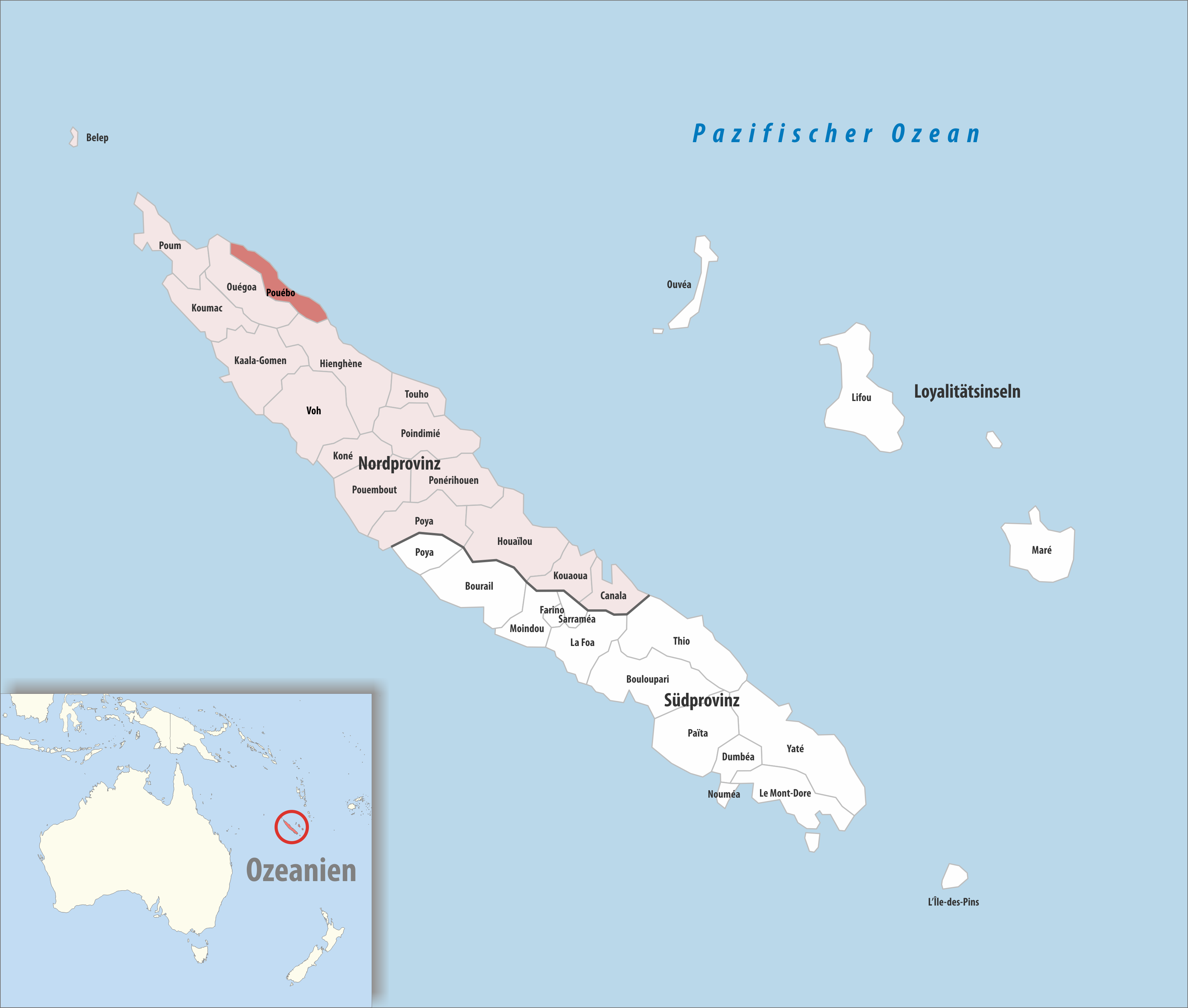
- Location of the commune (in red) within New Caledonia
- Location of Pouébo
- Coordinates: 20°23′51″S 164°34′08″E
- Country: France
- Sui generis collectivity: New Caledonia
- Province: North Province

Government
  - Mayor (2020–2026): Florentin Dedane
- Area^{1}: 202.8 km^{2} (78.3 sq mi)
- Elevation: 10 m (33 ft)
- Highest elevation: 1,406 m (4,613 ft)
- Lowest elevation: 0 m (0 ft)
- Population (2019 census): 2,144
  - Density: 10.57/km^{2} (27.38/sq mi)

Ethnic distribution
  - 2019 census: Kanaks 93.89% Europeans 2.29% Wallisians and Futunans 0.19% Mixed 1.07% Other 2.57%
- Time zone: UTC+11:00
- INSEE/Postal code: 98824 /98824
- ^{1} New Caledonia Land Register (DITTT) data, which exclude lakes and ponds larger than 1 km² (0.386 sq mi or 247 acres) as well as the estuaries of rivers.

Pouébo (French: [pwebo], Caac: Pweevo) is a commune in the North Province of New Caledonia, an overseas territory of France in the Pacific Ocean.

== Geography ==
=== Climate ===
Pouébo has a tropical rainforest climate (Köppen Af), closely bordering upon a tropical monsoon climate (Am). The average annual temperature in Pouébo is 24.5 °C (76.1 °F). The average annual rainfall is 1,996.0 mm (78.58 in) with March as the wettest month. The temperatures are highest on average in February, at around 27.1 °C (80.8 °F), and lowest in August, at around 21.7 °C (71.1 °F). The highest temperature ever recorded in Pouébo was 35.0 °C (95.0 °F) on 7 February 2016; the coldest temperature ever recorded was 13.0 °C (55.4 °F) on 24 July 2004.

Climate data for Pouébo (1981–2010 averages, extremes 1992−present)
Month	Jan	Feb	Mar	Apr	May	Jun	Jul	Aug	Sep	Oct	Nov	Dec	Year
Record high °C (°F)	34.3 (93.7)	35.0 (95.0)	34.1 (93.4)	32.5 (90.5)	32.1 (89.8)	29.9 (85.8)	29.7 (85.5)	30.9 (87.6)	31.7 (89.1)	31.6 (88.9)	32.4 (90.3)	34.4 (93.9)	35.0 (95.0)
Mean daily maximum °C (°F)	30.0 (86.0)	30.4 (86.7)	30.1 (86.2)	29.1 (84.4)	27.4 (81.3)	26.0 (78.8)	25.3 (77.5)	25.2 (77.4)	26.4 (79.5)	27.2 (81.0)	28.2 (82.8)	29.4 (84.9)	27.9 (82.2)
Daily mean °C (°F)	26.8 (80.2)	27.1 (80.8)	26.9 (80.4)	25.8 (78.4)	24.2 (75.6)	22.7 (72.9)	21.8 (71.2)	21.7 (71.1)	22.8 (73.0)	23.8 (74.8)	24.8 (76.6)	26.0 (78.8)	24.5 (76.1)
Mean daily minimum °C (°F)	23.5 (74.3)	23.9 (75.0)	23.7 (74.7)	22.5 (72.5)	20.9 (69.6)	19.5 (67.1)	18.4 (65.1)	18.2 (64.8)	19.1 (66.4)	20.3 (68.5)	21.4 (70.5)	22.6 (72.7)	21.2 (70.2)
Record low °C (°F)	19.5 (67.1)	20.0 (68.0)	19.4 (66.9)	17.3 (63.1)	15.1 (59.2)	14.5 (58.1)	13.0 (55.4)	13.7 (56.7)	14.3 (57.7)	15.5 (59.9)	16.7 (62.1)	18.1 (64.6)	13.0 (55.4)
Average rainfall mm (inches)	305.1 (12.01)	297.8 (11.72)	327.0 (12.87)	178.3 (7.02)	158.7 (6.25)	124.5 (4.90)	75.3 (2.96)	67.0 (2.64)	62.2 (2.45)	72.1 (2.84)	132.2 (5.20)	195.8 (7.71)	1,996 (78.58)
Average rainy days (≥ 1.0 mm)	17.4	16.7	16.4	11.7	10.1	8.6	6.2	6.8	6.2	8.5	10.8	14.7	134.1
Source: Meteociel
