= Transport in New Caledonia =

The transportation networks in New Caledonia face several geographical constraints, including its insularity, climate, distance from Metropolitan France (approximately 17,000 km (11,000 mi)), the relatively large size of the main island, Grande Terre (with an area of 16,346 km^{2} (6,311 sq mi), it is the largest French island, twice the size of Corsica), and the presence of the Central Range spanning nearly its entire length. Additionally, there are limited alternatives to road transport for internal travel, except for inter-island maritime connections and a still-limited domestic air network.

Since 1999, New Caledonia has held authority over foreign trade (except for import and export restrictions related to matters under state jurisdiction, such as customs regulations), territorial maritime services (including ship registration, though maritime safety and international regulations remain under state control), air services (except for connections with other French territories, aircraft registration, and international aviation safety), road transport, vehicle registration (consisting of a six-digit number followed by "NC"), issuance of driver's licenses (valid throughout France but not subject to the points-based system used in Metropolitan France), issuance of vehicle registration certificates, and the promotion of road safety (though general regulations, enforcement, and penalties remain under state jurisdiction for public safety). The transport and distribution of electrical energy, as well as territorial port and airport infrastructure, also fall under New Caledonia's purview.

In 2009, additional responsibilities were transferred from the state to New Caledonia, including the policing and safety of domestic air traffic (for operators based in New Caledonia whose primary activity is not international air transport), maritime traffic within New Caledonia, and maritime rescue operations in territorial waters, as outlined in Article 26 of the 1999 Organic Law.

These responsibilities are managed by the Directorate of Infrastructure, Topography, and Land Transport (DITTT) of the Government of New Caledonia and two joint state-New Caledonia services: the Directorate of Civil Aviation (DAC) and the Maritime Affairs Service (AffMar). These sectors are overseen by one or more members of the local government. Since 11, Gilbert Tyuienon (a member of the FLNKS-UC, also vice-president of the government until 5) has been responsible for domestic air, land, and maritime transport. Since 3, international air transport has also been included, marking the first time since 2009 that this sector has not been managed by the executive president.

== Road transport ==
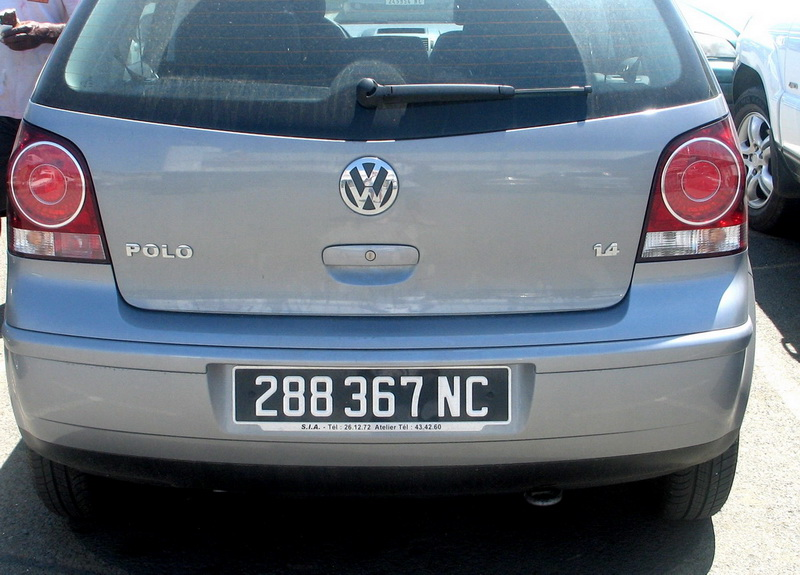
Vehicle registration plate in New Caledonia, pre-2018 standardization.

Road transport is the dominant mode of transportation in New Caledonia, especially on Grande Terre, the main island. Driving is on the right, adhering to the French traffic code with local adaptations.

=== Brief history ===
For European settlers, horse-drawn transport, including sulky, buggy, and patache (stagecoaches), was the primary means of land travel outside Nouméa until 1900, when road development allowed up to 100 km (62 mi) of daily travel. A relay station with a hotel was established in La Foa. Automobiles appeared in 1903, and by 1904, an automobile mail service between Nouméa and Bourail replaced boat transport.

=== Total road network ===
As of early 2006, the total road network spanned 5,622 km (3,493 mi), equating to 30.3 km (18.8 mi) per 100 km^{2} (39 sq mi)—a density five times lower than Metropolitan France but three times higher than Australia and comparable to New Zealand—and approximately 23.8 km (14.8 mi) per 1,000 inhabitants. The network is evenly distributed across the three provinces, with disparities decreasing. In 2006, the South Province had 2,270 km (1,410 mi) (32.4 km (20.1 mi) per 100 km^{2} (39 sq mi)), the North Province had 2,580 km (1,600 mi) (26.92 km (16.73 mi) per 100 km^{2} (39 sq mi)), and the Loyalty Islands Province had 772 km (480 mi) (39 km (24 mi) per 100 km^{2} (39 sq mi)).

The road network extends nearly continuously around the perimeter of Grande Terre, except for the "forgotten coast" between Thio and Yaté. Six transverse roads cross the Central Range, connecting Mont-Dore to Yaté, Boulouparis to Thio, La Foa to Kouaoua or Canala, Bourail to Houaïlou, Koné to Poindimié (the Koné-Tiwaka), and Koumac to Ouégoa.

=== Types of road networks ===
New Caledonia's road networks are categorized into three types based on ownership and maintenance: territorial roads (RT) managed by New Caledonia, provincial roads (RP) managed by the provinces, and municipal roads (urban roads and rural paths) managed by the communes.

==== Territorial roads ====
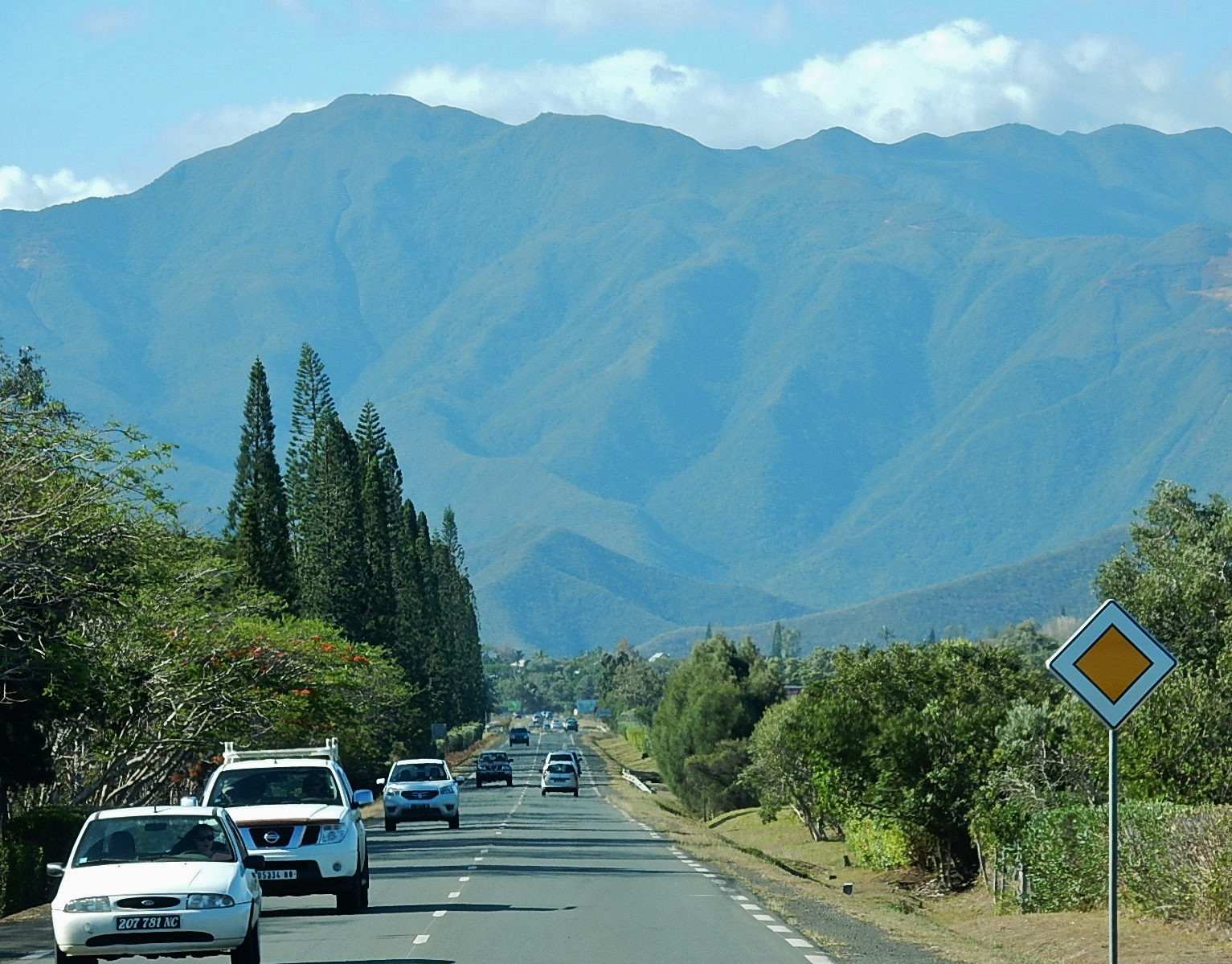
The RT1 at La Tontouta.

There are four territorial roads, totaling 575 km (357 mi) in 2006, representing 10.2% of the total network. These primarily connect the South and North Provinces or serve economically significant territorial infrastructure. Most are fully paved:

- Territorial Road 1 (RT 1), the longest and oldest, spans 401 km (249 mi). It runs along the west coast of Grande Terre from Nouméa to Koumac, serving the Brousse and village centers of communes north of Nouméa (Dumbéa, Païta, Boulouparis, La Foa, Moindou, Bourail, Poya, Pouembout, Koné, Voh, Kaala-Gomen, and Koumac). It also serves Nouméa–La Tontouta International Airport. Speed limits range from 110 km/h (68 mph) on open stretches to 90 km/h (56 mph), 70 km/h (43 mph), or 50 km/h (31 mph) in urban areas.
- Territorial Road 2 (RT 2) connects the port of Wé in the east to Lifou-Wanaham Airport in the north on Lifou, covering 21 km (13 mi).
- Territorial Road 3 (RT 3), one of the six roads crossing the Central Range, spans 145 km (90 mi). It starts at Bourail on the west coast, crosses the Roussettes Pass to Houaïlou, then follows the east coast northwest to the junction with the Koné-Tiwaka transverse road after Poindimié.
- Territorial Road 4 (RT 4), the shortest at 8 km (5.0 mi) (3 km (1.9 mi) unpaved), connects Poya to the mining village and industrial port of Népoui on the west coast.

==== Provincial roads ====
Provincial roads total 778 km (483 mi), nearly all paved, comprising 13.84% of New Caledonia's road network. The North Province has the largest share (450 km (280 mi)), followed by the South Province (285 km (177 mi)) and the Loyalty Islands Province (44 km (27 mi)).

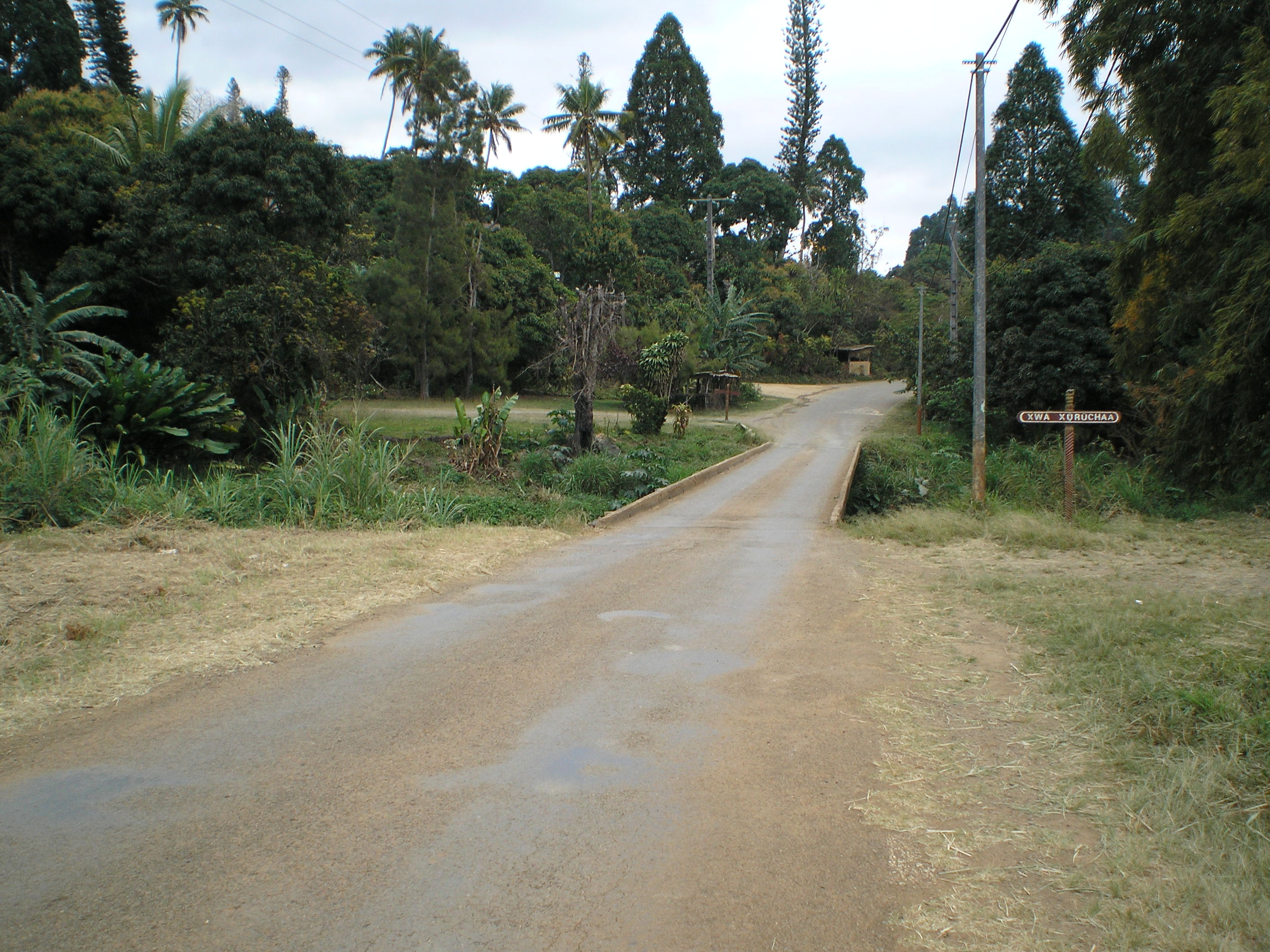
The RPN 3 in Canala.

===== North Province =====
- Provincial Road North 1 (RPN 1) extends 40 km (25 mi), continuing from RT 1 north of Koumac along the west coast to Poum.
- Provincial Road North 2 (RPN 2), or "Koné-Tiwaka," is a 71 km (44 mi) transverse road from Koné on the west coast to the Tiwaka River mouth on the east coast, connecting to RT 3 and RPN 10.
- Provincial Road North 3 (RPN 3), approximately 120 km (75 mi), runs from Houaïlou along the east coast to the Petchekara Pass near Thio, passing through Kouaoua and Canala. The pass is a scheduled road.
- Provincial Road North 5 (RPN 5), about 5 km (3.1 mi), forms part of the Amieu Pass transverse road, connecting Sarraméa to Canala at the Koh Pass, where it meets RPN 3.
- Provincial Road North 7 (RPN 7), a 55 km (34 mi) transverse road, connects Koumac to Balade on the east coast, joining RPN 10.
- Provincial Road North 8 (RPN 8), 11 km (6.8 mi), runs from Koumac along the west coast to the Paagoumène wharf.
- Provincial Road North 10 (RPN 10), the longest northern provincial road at 132 km (82 mi), runs along the east coast from the Tiwaka River mouth to Balade, passing through Touho, Hienghène, and Pouébo. It includes a ferry crossing at the Ouaieme River near Hienghène.

===== South Province =====
- Three expressways serve Greater Nouméa, including two bypass roads: one to Dumbéa and Païta northwest of the capital, and another to Mont-Dore east of the capital:
  - The Western Bypass (VDO) comprises:
    - Expressway No. 1 - Normandie Road (E1), commonly known as the "bypass," is an 8 km (5.0 mi) four-lane road opened in 1969. It connects the General Patch (Pacific) roundabout at Nouméa's city center and port to the Normandie Bridge near the boundaries of Nouméa, Dumbéa, and Mont-Dore. Speed limits are 70 km/h (43 mph) (50 km/h (31 mph) at the Berthelot/Mageco roundabout, now bypassed by an overpass) and 80 km/h (50 mph) in the Ducos and Rivière-Salée areas. It is managed by the South Province.
    - Expressway No. 2 - Northern Road (E2), or "savexpress," is a 20 km (12 mi) road opened in 1979, managed by the South Province's financing company, PromoSud. It runs from the E1 at Koutio in Dumbéa to the Téné junction in Païta, where it joins RT 1. Initially a toll road, it became free on 26. It is now fully four-lane, with speed limits of 70 km/h (43 mph) to Koutio's toll booth and 110 km/h (68 mph) thereafter.
  - The Eastern Bypass (VDE), opened between 2000 and 2001, spans 7 km (4.3 mi) from the Rabot (Belle-Vie) roundabout northeast of Nouméa to the Boulari roundabout in Mont-Dore's urban center. Initially a toll road, it became free on 26 and is managed by Savexpress. Fully four-lane, its speed limits are 50 km/h (31 mph) at roundabouts, 70 km/h (43 mph) to the Tina toll booth, 90 km/h (56 mph) to the Week-End roundabout serving La Conception, and 70 km/h (43 mph) thereafter. Much of its route is built on reclaimed land in the sea.
- Provincial Road 1 (RP 1), or "Southern Road," is approximately 30 km (19 mi), connecting the Normandie interchange northeast of Nouméa to the Pirogues River mouth in Plum. It serves as the central axis of Mont-Dore, spanning nearly its entire length from west to east.
- Provincial Road 2 (RP 2), or "Mont-Dore Corniche," is about 15 km (9.3 mi). It branches from RP 1 at the La Coulée roundabout and rejoins it at Plum, bypassing the Plum Pass and skirting the Mont-Dore massif along the coast. It serves the Vallon-Dore and Mont-Dore Sud areas, primarily consisting of secondary residences and suburban subdivisions.
- Provincial Road 3 (RP 3), or "Yaté Road," is the southernmost transverse road on Grande Terre, spanning about 55 km (34 mi). It starts at RP 1 near La Coulée, passes the Deux Tétons Pass, and follows Yaté Lake to Yaté village.
- Provincial Road 4 (RP 4), or "Thio Road," is a 45 km (28 mi) transverse road from Boulouparis on the west coast, via the Nassirah Pass, to RP 10 between Thio-Village and Thio-Mission on the east coast.
- Provincial Road 5 (RP 5), or "Amieu Pass Road," forms the first half of the transverse road from Fonwhary (near La Foa and Farino) to the Koh Pass, connecting to Kouaoua or Canala in the North Province. It spans about 27 km (17 mi) to the border between Sarraméa and Canala, then becomes RPN 5. It provides the only access to Farino and Sarraméa.
- Provincial Road 7 (RP 7), or "Baie des Dames Road," is about 7 km (4.3 mi) within Nouméa's Ducos Peninsula quarter, serving as its main axis from the Montravel interchange with E1 to the Koumourou fuel reservoirs, covering the entire industrial zone.
- Provincial Road 10 (RP 10), or "Petchekara Road," spans 16 km (9.9 mi) along the east coast from the junction with RP 4 between Thio-Mission and Thio-Village to the Petchekara Pass at the border with Canala in the North Province, where it becomes RPN 3. The pass is a scheduled road.
- Provincial Road 11 (RP 11), or "Yahoué Road," is about 4 km (2.5 mi) in Greater Nouméa, connecting RP 1 at the border of Nouméa's Normandie and Mont-Dore's Pont-des-Français to the Yahoué residential suburb.
- Provincial Road 12 (RP 12), or "Auteuil Road," is less than 1 km (0.62 mi), connecting the Yahoué and Auteuil suburbs of Mont-Dore and Dumbéa.
- Provincial Road 14 (RP 14), or "Magenta Road," spans 3 km (1.9 mi), covering most of Roger Gervolino Street from the Magenta-Plage roundabout to the Rabot (Belle-Vie) roundabout, passing Magenta Airport.
- Provincial Road 16 (RP 16), or "Farino Road," is about 3 km (1.9 mi), branching from RP 5 to serve Farino.
- Provincial Road 17 (RP 17), or "Waho Road," connects RP 3 to the Waho tribal village, the administrative center of Yaté, over about 3 km (1.9 mi).
- Provincial Road 18 (RP 18), or "Sarraméa Road," spans about 3.5 km (2.2 mi), branching from RP 5 to serve Sarraméa.
- Provincial Road 20 (RP 20), or "Poé Road," is 15 km (9.3 mi), starting from RT 1 after the Néra River bridge near Bourail, heading south then west to Poé Beach via Roche Percée and the Gouaro tribal village.

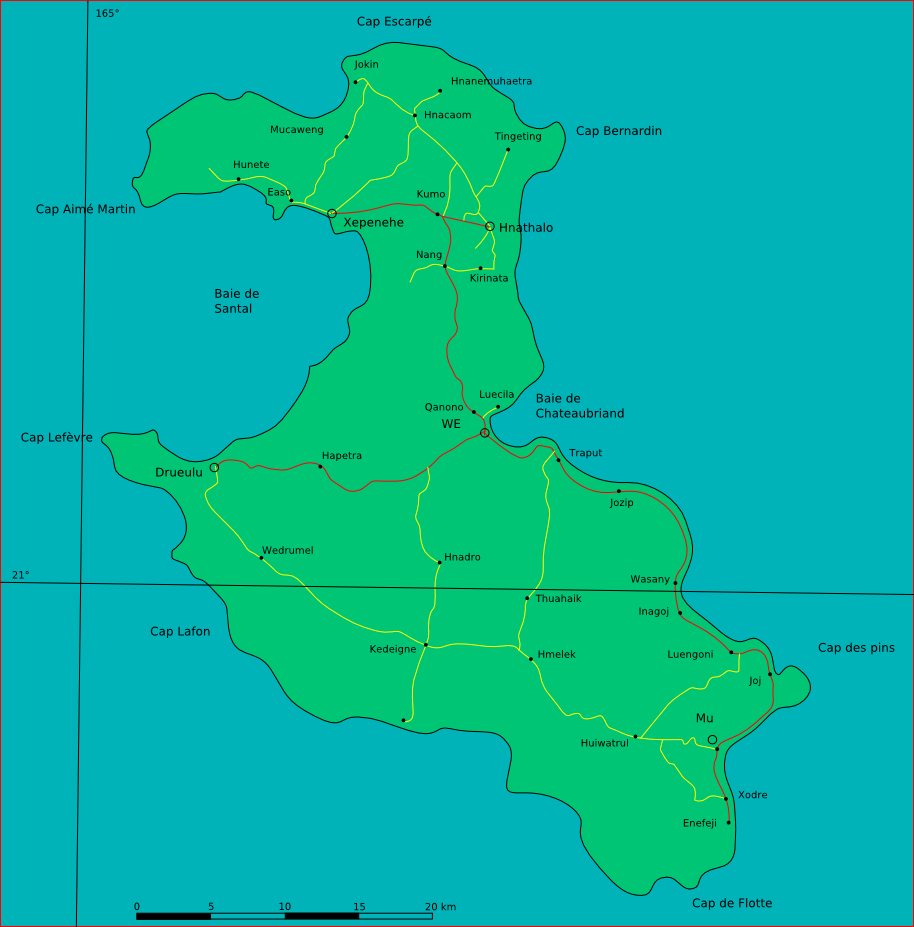
Map of the road network in Lifou.

===== Loyalty Islands =====
- Provincial Road 1 (RP 1) on Lifou, about 10 km (6.2 mi), runs from the Kumo roundabout near Lifou-Wanaham Airport to the Chépénéhé tribal wharf in the west.
- Provincial Road 2 (RP 2) on Ouvéa, just over 13 km (8.1 mi), connects Ouloup Airport in the center-east to the Wadrilla tribal wharf in the center-west.
- Provincial Road 3 (RP 3) on Maré, about 23 km (14 mi), connects La Roche Airport in the northeast to Tadine in the southwest.

==== Municipal roads ====
Municipal roads, totaling 4,268 km (2,652 mi) (75.9% of the network), form the majority of New Caledonia's roads. Of these, 79.1% (3,376 km (2,098 mi)) are municipal roads and urban streets (serving municipal interests, maintained by communes, with a minimum width of 20 m (66 ft)). The remaining 892 km (554 mi) are rural paths (width between 10 m (33 ft) and 20 m (66 ft), connecting to sites without direct access, mostly unpaved).

The South Province has the most extensive municipal road and urban street network (1,498 km (931 mi), 66% of its roads), but its rural paths (258 km (160 mi)) are only slightly longer than those in the Loyalty Islands Province (233 km (145 mi)). In the North Province, municipal roads and urban streets total 1,498 km (931 mi) (54.4%), while in the Loyalty Islands Province, they span 474 km (295 mi) (61.4%).

=== Condition of the road network ===
Since 1989, New Caledonia's road network has seen significant improvements, including increased pavement coverage, the construction of new roads such as the Koné-Tiwaka, and initiatives to improve access to tribal areas. However, growing traffic volumes, heavier transported loads (driven by major projects like the southern and northern factories or infrastructure developments such as the expansion of La Tontouta Airport and preparations for the 2011 Pacific Games), and the region's climatic conditions—marked by heavy rainfall, cyclones, high humidity, and heat—have significantly damaged roads, leading to rapid pothole formation and weakened infrastructure. This necessitates frequent and substantial maintenance.

According to the New Caledonia Road Transport Companies Union (SETRNC) and the Miners' Contractors Union (Contrakmine), urgent issues include not only the aging road infrastructure and engineering structures—such as bridges at Tontouta, Ouenghi, Moindah, and Ponérihouen, built in 1945 and showing signs of cracking—but also the general condition of road surfaces and signage. They have stated: "It's outrageous that speed limits reach 110 km/h on some disastrous sections! Improving signage wouldn't be costly. North of Nandaï (after Bourail), the road to the north is catastrophic. Koné will soon have 20,000 inhabitants. Roads may be less visible than a new airport, but they are essential for the country's development."

=== Modes of transport ===
==== Vehicle fleet ====
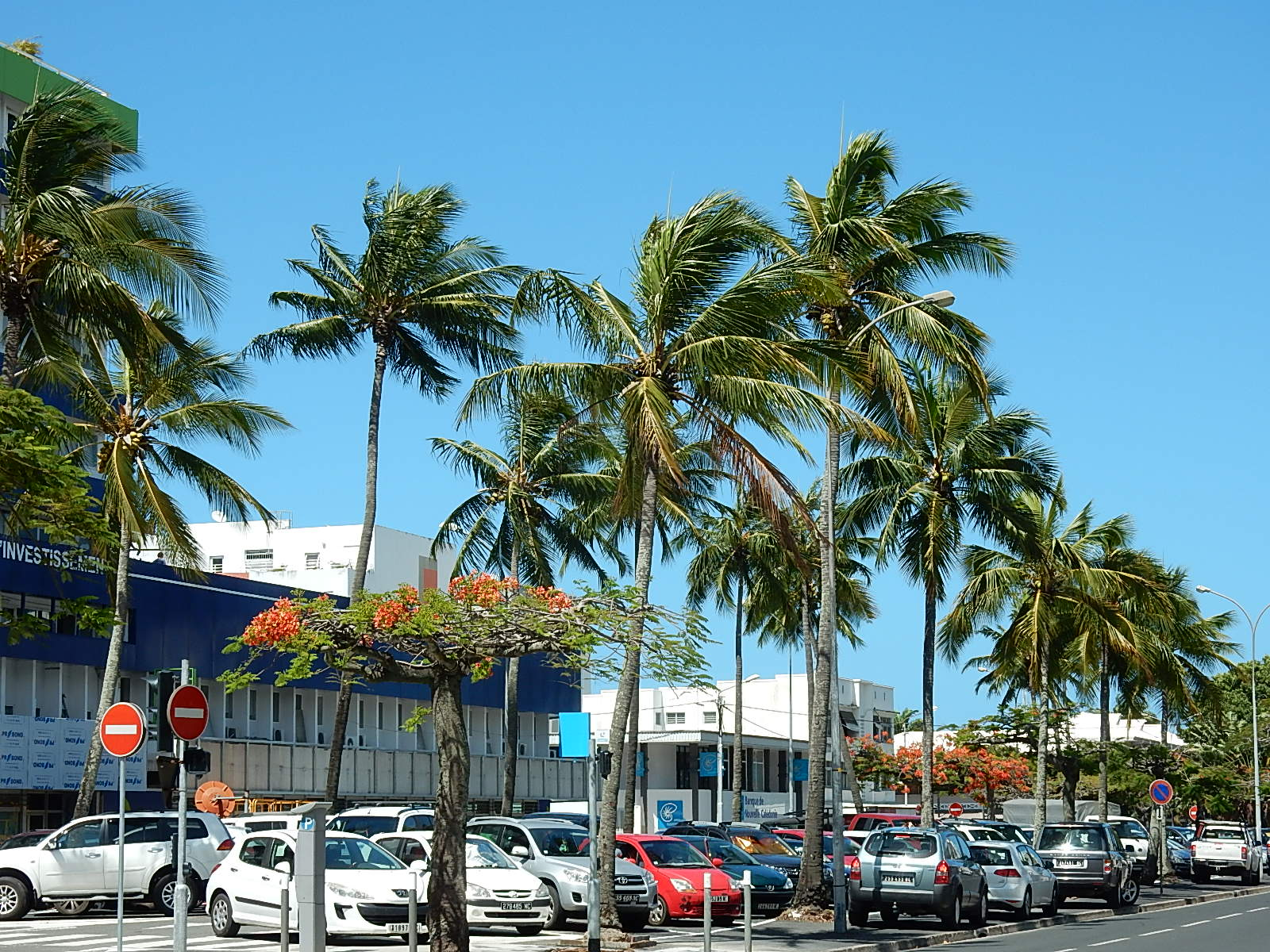
Parking lot in the center of Avenue de la Victoire - Henri-Lafleur, in downtown Nouméa.

Car ownership in New Caledonia is relatively high, primarily due to the lack of viable alternatives to road transport and the limited development of public transportation. In 2004, 74.4% of New Caledonian households owned at least one vehicle (car or van), a rate higher than other French overseas departments or collectivities and approaching that of Metropolitan France (80.7%). This figure rose to 77% in 2009 and 77.5% in 2014. Significant geographical disparities, reflecting lifestyle differences, are evident but diminishing. In 2004, 82.6% of households in the South Province (83.9% in Greater Nouméa) owned at least one vehicle, compared to 55.3% in the North Province and 36.7% in the Loyalty Islands Province. By 2009, these figures were 82.8% in the South (still 83.9% in Greater Nouméa), 60.65% in the North, and 45.9% in the Loyalty Islands. In 2014, they reached 82.1% in the South (82.9% in Greater Nouméa, slightly lower due to economic downturns and improved public transport), 65.3% in the North (77.3% on the west coast, driven by urban growth in the Voh-Koné-Pouembout area), and 49.65% in the Loyalty Islands. Bicycle ownership is notably higher in the North (29.1%) and Loyalty Islands (27.8%) than in the South (24.5%) in 2004.

The vehicle fleet grew rapidly in the 2000s, fueled by strong economic growth driven by high global nickel prices. New vehicle registrations increased from 6,526 in 1995 and 7,907 in 2000 to 11,489 in 2005, 12,215 in 2006, 13,439 in 2007, and 13,639 in 2008. The global economic crisis slowed this trend, with 13,246 new registrations in 2009 (slightly below 2008), followed by a slight recovery to 13,684 in 2010 and 13,580 in 2011. The early 2010s, marked by economic challenges, saw a decline: 12,784 in 2012, 11,694 in 2013, 11,707 in 2014, and 10,641 in 2015.

The rise in new vehicle purchases, particularly passenger cars, pickups, and vans, has favored diesel-powered vehicles (peaking at over 6,000 units in 2007, 2010, and 2011) and foreign models (surpassing French models since 2004, peaking at over 9,000 units in 2010 and 2011). Hybrid and electric vehicles emerged in 2012 but remain marginal (3 in 2012, 2 in 2013, 15 in 2014, and 16 in 2015). New Caledonians increasingly prefer pickups and vans. Once associated with rural "Broussards" and Nouméa residents with rural properties, these vehicles have gained popularity among urban dwellers. Pickups and vans accounted for 21.8% of new vehicle registrations in 2000, rising to 24.1% in 2005, 27.9% in 2006, and 29.9% in 2007. Despite a decline in purchases during 2008–2009 and especially since 2011, their share remained significant: 31.15% in 2011, 29.56% in 2012, 30.95% in 2013, 30.14% in 2014, and 28.41% in 2015.

==== Public transportation ====
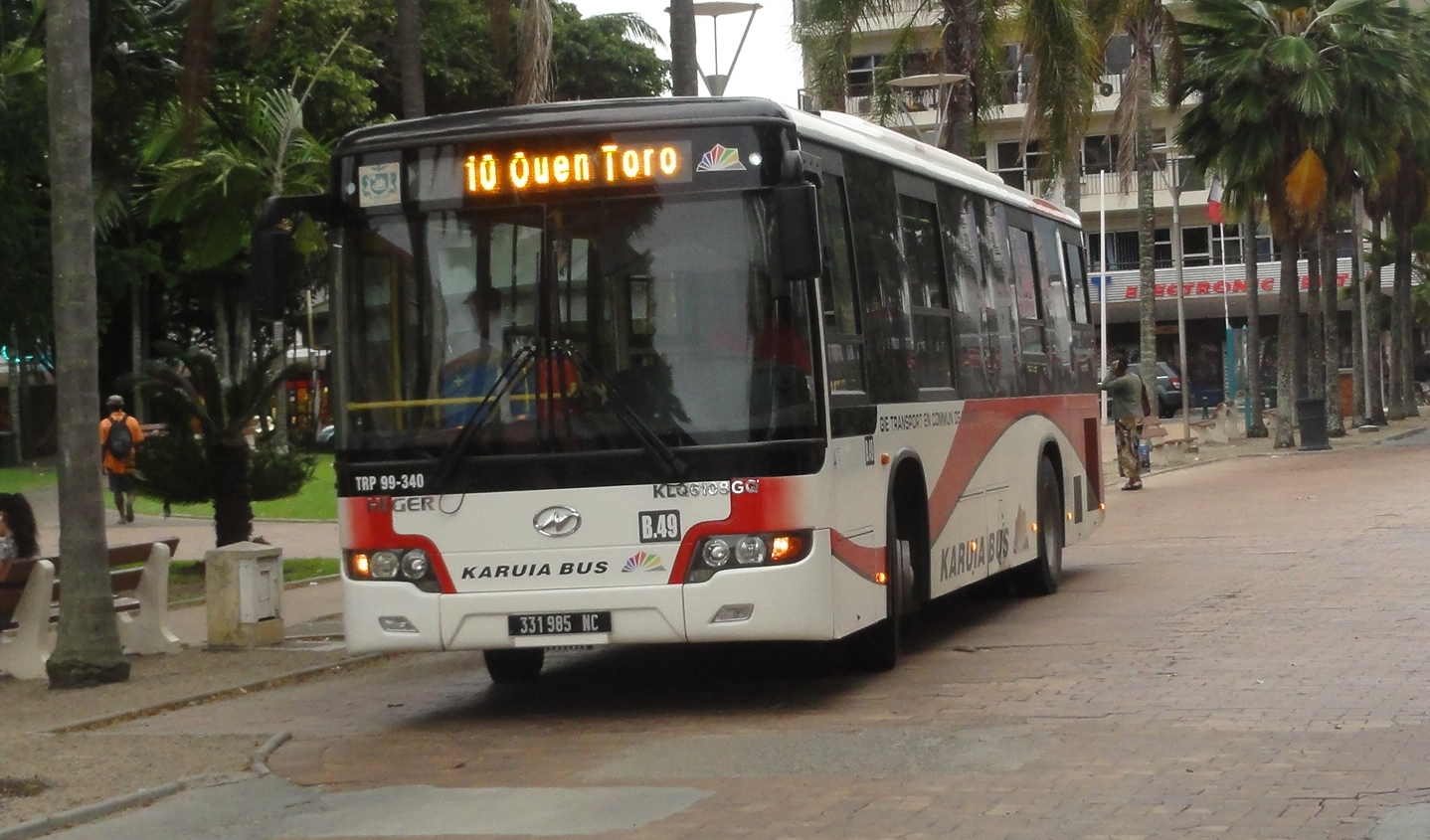
Former Karuïa Bus in Nouméa, serving line 10 at Place des Cocotiers.

Four entities manage public transportation in New Caledonia: the communes of Greater Nouméa (either Nouméa alone or in intercommunal cooperation with suburban communes), the South Province, New Caledonia, and private operators. The most developed networks are in Greater Nouméa, where, until 2019, three operators shared services: Karuïa Bus (53%), CarSud (37%), and SCT (formerly Transco, 10%) in 2007.

- Karuïa Bus, the urban bus network of Nouméa, is managed by the GIE Transport en Commun de Nouméa (TCN). It comprises 24 lines, grouped by numbering. According to Gérard Vignes, Nouméa's deputy mayor for transportation, the Karuïa network grew from 9,000 to 18,000 daily users between 2001 and 2010, 13,000 more than the CarSud network. The network was overhauled in 2016.
- CarSud, the interurban bus network for Greater Nouméa, is a subsidiary of PromoSud (the South Province's development and investment company, also the delegating authority) and Veolia Transport, which, despite being a minority shareholder behind PromoSud, manages the company. It includes five main lines (A, B, C, D, and E), organized along two main routes from Nouméa: lines A and E serve Nouméa, B and C extend to Dumbéa and Païta in the north, and D serves Mont-Dore in the south. It also includes eight secondary lines branching from B, C, and D, four express lines, one shuttle, and one on-demand line.
- SCT operates school transport for secondary students.

The transport organizing authority for these three networks is the SMTU (Syndicat Mixte des Transports Urbains), established in 2010.

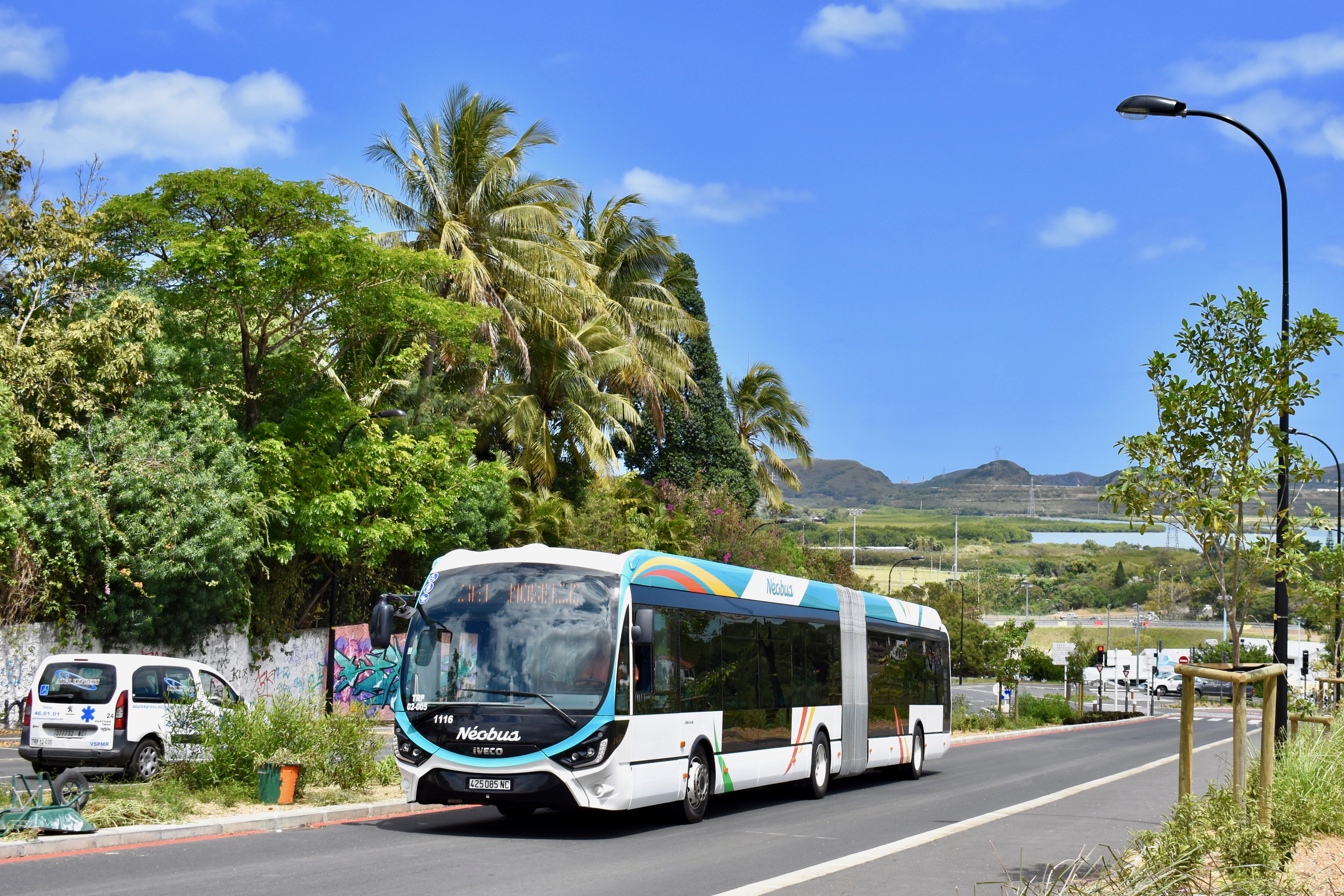
The bus rapid transit, Néobus, after its launch in 2019, in Koutio (Dumbéa).

However, persistent challenges—such as lack of coordination between networks (e.g., on fares or schedules), the absence of bus priority (with the first dedicated bus lane for Karuïa Bus introduced only in 2008 in downtown Nouméa)—limit the ability of public transport to compete with private car use. During the 2008 Nouméa municipal election, improving traffic flow was a key campaign issue. Several candidates, including "Changer, c'est capital(e)" led by Sonia Lagarde (which came in second), proposed developing dedicated public transport systems. Lagarde suggested a tramway linking the future Dumbéa-sur-mer urban center to downtown Nouméa via the planned Koutio "médipôle," covering 12 km at an estimated cost of 3 billion CFP francs (25.14 million euros).

In August 2010, the South Province Assembly adopted a Greater Nouméa coherence plan (SCAN) alongside a mobility plan (PDAN) to enhance public transportation and reduce commuting times. These plans included establishing the SMTU to coordinate transport activities in Greater Nouméa (with the eventual merger of the three urban networks), introducing a bus rapid transit system (Néobus), and launching maritime shuttles connecting the urban center to its suburbs. However, short-term provincial actions, such as the Sud Express plan to improve car traffic flow (e.g., through controversial projects like the Étrier interchange or the Berthelot junction grade separation), conflict with these public transport goals. Nevertheless, the Néobus was launched in 2019, alongside the new unified Greater Nouméa network, Tanéo, replacing Karuïa Bus and CarSud.

Outside Greater Nouméa, the RAÏ (Réseau d'Autocars Interurbain) serves the rest of the territory with 25 interurban bus lines, managed by the SMTI (Syndicat Mixte du Transport Interurbain).

Numerous private companies offer tourist public transport via buses (some organized as economic interest groupings providing excursions and airport shuttles), vans, or minivans (mostly serving hotels or guesthouses). The taxi service is provided by the Radio Taxis Association, identifiable by their illuminated signs, green-and-white colors, and standardized fares.

==== Freight transport ====
Road freight transport is relatively underdeveloped compared to maritime transport. Most imported goods (equipment and manufactured products, including cars) arrive in Nouméa and are sold locally. Mining products from the Brousse are transported to Nouméa or directly exported via ore carriers. Road freight primarily involves food and consumer goods (Brousse products sent to Nouméa or processed/imported goods distributed to small retail stores in the Brousse), mail delivery, or mining and construction equipment (e.g., trucks, tractors, machinery).

=== Road safety ===
New Caledonia experiences a high road mortality rate. In 2009, 60 people died in road accidents, and 52 in 2019, a rate four times higher than Metropolitan France. Annual road deaths have consistently exceeded 50 since 1985, with peaks in 1990 (74), 2005 (71), and 2007 (62). In 2004, the road mortality rate reached 361 deaths per million inhabitants, four times higher than Metropolitan France and nearly 2.5 times higher than Poland, then the worst-performing European Union country. In 2007, road accidents were the fifth leading cause of death in New Caledonia (5% of total mortality), trailing tumors, circulatory diseases, nervous system disorders, and ill-defined conditions, but ahead of digestive, infectious, and parasitic diseases.

While bodily injury accidents are concentrated in Nouméa (516 of 667 in 2007), they are generally less severe than in the Brousse. In 2007, the 151 accidents outside Nouméa resulted in 160 injuries (compared to 586 in Nouméa), but 156 were serious (versus 123 in Nouméa), and 55 of the 62 fatalities occurred outside the capital. According to ISEE, the main causes of accidents in Nouméa are non-compliance with traffic rules (about 33%), driving under the influence of alcohol (15%), and excessive or inappropriate speed (less than 5%). In the Brousse, alcohol is the primary factor (36%), followed by speed (35%), with traffic rule violations accounting for less than 10% of accidents. Authorities and road safety organizations identify alcoholism, drug use (notably cannabis), excessive speed, poor road conditions, and the lack of effective enforcement (e.g., no automatic radar in 2010) as the main causes of road fatalities.

To address this, competent authorities (primarily the state or the local government) have launched initiatives, including media prevention campaigns (often using graphic imagery), bans on takeaway alcohol sales during most weekends and holidays since 2008 (initiated by then High Commissioner Yves Dassonville), and an emergency plan introduced in late 2009.

== Maritime transport ==
Historically, from the first Austronesian navigators to European explorers, access to New Caledonia's islands was primarily by sea. While air travel has largely replaced maritime passenger transport since the 1960s (except for tourist cruises and some inter-island domestic travel), maritime transport remains dominant for freight.

=== History ===
==== The outrigger canoe: Traditional Melanesian transport ====
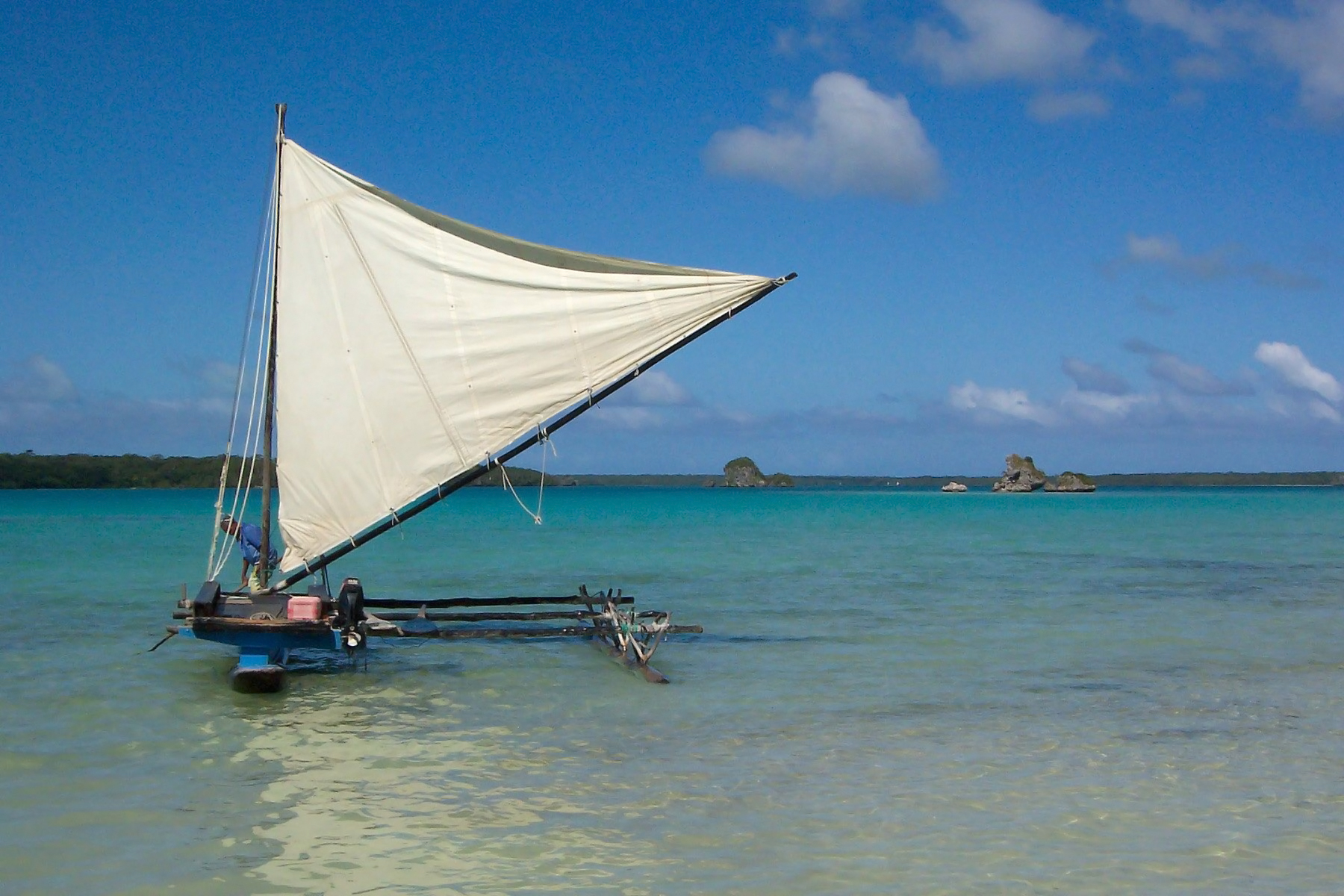
Melanesian outrigger canoe at Île des Pins.

The initial settlement of New Caledonia relied on maritime navigation. Around 3000 BCE, inhabitants of southern China's coast, cultivating millet and rice and known as Austronesians, began crossing the strait to settle in Taiwan. By 2000 BCE, migrations extended from Taiwan to the Philippines, followed by movements to Sulawesi, Timor, and other Indonesian archipelago islands. By 1500 BCE, migrations reached New Guinea and beyond to the Pacific islands. Austronesians are likely humanity's earliest navigators.

From 200 BCE to the arrival of Europeans in the late 18th and 19th centuries, the Kanak culture developed, likely from increasing regional differentiation among Austronesian Lapita populations and new arrivals from the Solomon Islands or Vanuatu, part of the first wave of Oceanic settlement (the Sahul). Oral Kanak traditions also recount Polynesian migrations from Tonga, Samoa, Wallis, and Futuna to the Loyalty Islands and Île des Pins, likely between the 16th and early 19th centuries. This explains socio-linguistic distinctions among the Loyalty Islanders and Kunié, including the continued use of the Polynesian faga-uvea language in Ouvéa. Kanaks continue to use traditional outrigger canoes, now often equipped with modern additions like motorized propellers.

==== Messageries Maritimes liners ====
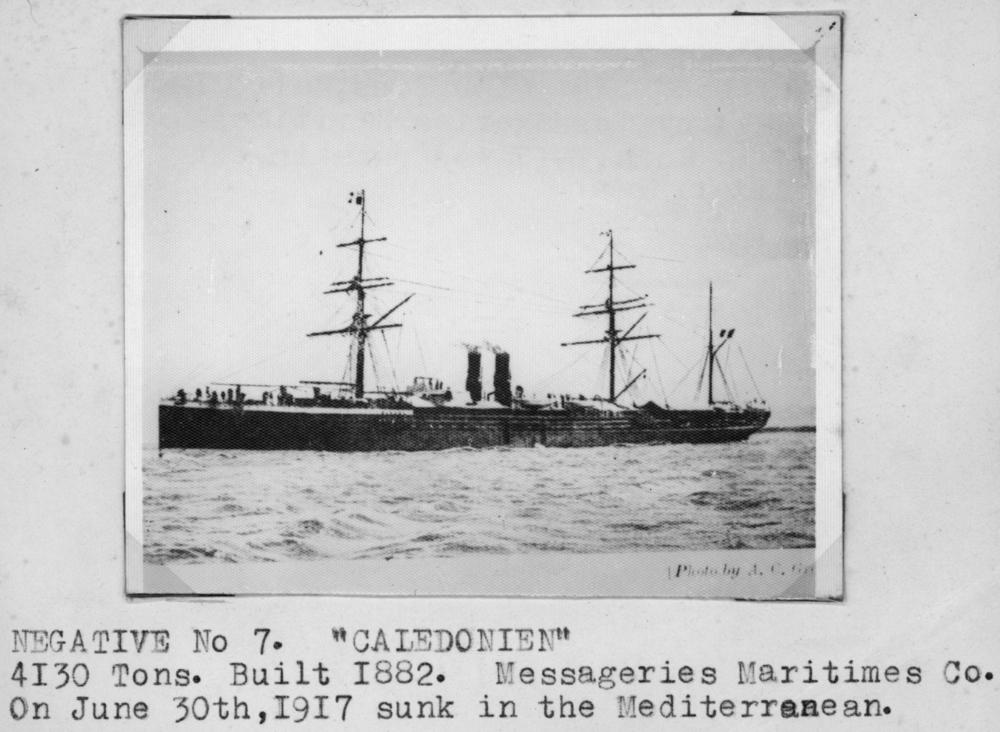
The liner Le Calédonien.

From 1872, the Tour de Côte provided bi-monthly coastal service, initially operated by a company linked to André Marchand and John Higginson.

International maritime connections were soon dominated by Messageries Maritimes. They established the first regular line to Australia and New Caledonia, inaugurated on November 23, 1882, with the steamer Le Natal (12 knots), arriving in Nouméa on January 14, 1883. Previously, the state relied on English companies for limited mail transport via Australia, alongside convict transports to the penal colony. The Messageries Maritimes line was served three times by Le Natal until 1884, followed by sister liners (13–16 knots): Le Melbourne (1884–1895), Le Calédonien (1882–1889), Le Sydney (1882–1913), Le Salazie (1883–1890), Le Yarra (1883–1909, alternating with the China line from 1897–1909), and L'Océanien (1885–1892). The route departed from Marseille, stopping at Port Said, Suez (via the Suez Canal), Aden, Mahé, Réunion, Port Louis, King George Sound, Adelaide, Melbourne, and Sydney before reaching Nouméa, covering 12,000 nautical miles in about 60 days. A secondary line operated between Nouméa and Sydney (extended to New Hebrides from 1901), connecting with English liners, using Le Tanais (1889–1901), Le Pacifique (1901–1925), Le Dupleix (1925–1928), the mixed cargo ship Le Bucéphale (mainly to New Hebrides, 1932–1937), Le Polynésien (II) (1937–1941, 1946–1955), and Le Polynésie (1955–1972).

Travel times decreased after 1887 by eliminating stops at Réunion and Port Louis and deploying faster liners, such as the L'Australien series from 1890 (with a record speed of 17 knots, unmatched until after World War I). These included L'Australien (1890–1903), Le Polynésien (1891–1903, 1914–1918, setting the speed record), L'Armand Behic (1891–1912, alternating with the Far East line from 1903), and La Ville de La Ciotat (1892–1903). World War I suspended regular lines from 1914 to 1919, maintaining only the Sydney-Nouméa and Nouméa-New Hebrides routes via Le Pacifique, with occasional state-chartered cargo ships like Le Gange (1916–1917) for mail and troop transport. In 1919, Messageries Maritimes launched a new line from Dunkirk via the Panama Canal and Tahiti, served by the mixed liner L'El Kantara, which, in its first voyage, repatriated New Caledonian World War I volunteers and was the first Messageries ship to pass through Panama. It operated until its demolition in December 1926.

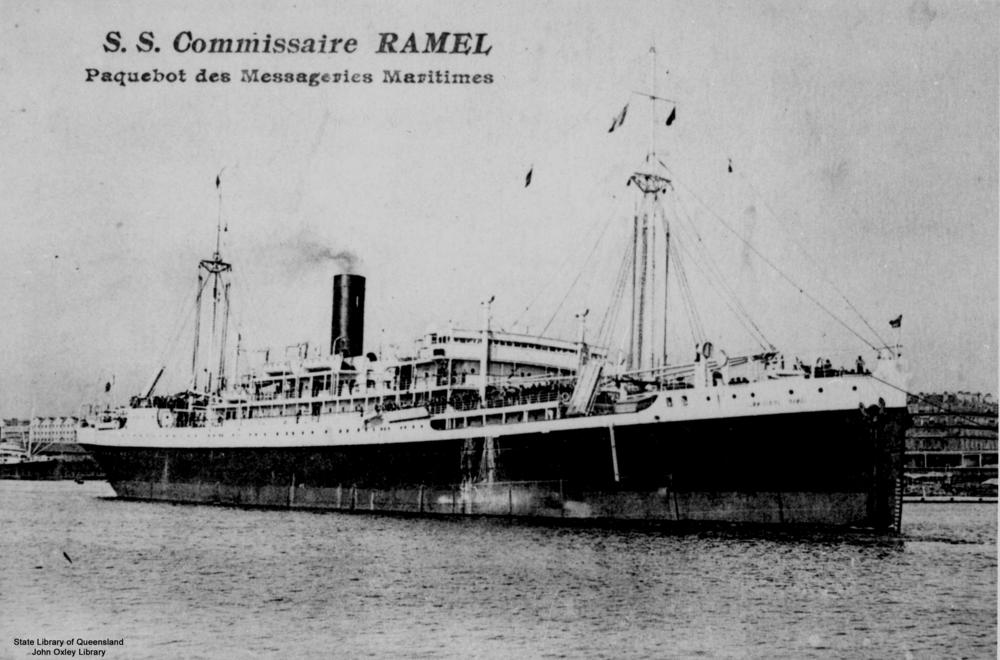
The mixed cargo ship Commissaire Ramel.

The Marseille-Nouméa route via Suez continued until 1924, supported by L'El Kantaras sister ship, Le Louxor (1922–1924, then Dunkirk-Nouméa via Panama until 1929). Subsequently, the Marseille-Australia line stopped at Sydney (except for occasional extensions to Nouméa), with the Sydney-Nouméa secondary line taking over. Newer or more modern mixed cargo ships or liners replaced older vessels:

- Three sister liners: Le Ville de Strasbourg (Australia via Suez, 1922–1930, then Nouméa via Panama, 1930–1940), Le Ville de Verdun (Australia via Suez, 1922–1927, then Nouméa via Panama, 1927–1940; requisitioned by the Japanese in Saigon in 1942 as Ateison Maru and sunk soon after), and Le Ville d'Amiens (Australia via Suez, 1924–1934, then Nouméa via Panama, 1934–1940, 1944–1950);
- The mixed cargo ship L'Eridan (first with square funnels; Dunkirk-Australia, 1929–1934, Marseille-Australia, 1934–1935, Marseille-Nouméa via Panama, 1935–1940, 1948–1951, 1954–1956);
- The mixed cargo ship Le Commissaire Ramel (Dunkirk-Australia, 1929–1934, Marseille-Australia, 1934–1935, Marseille-Nouméa via Panama, 1935–1940, lost at sea in 1940);
- The mixed liner Le Sagittaire (Marseille-Nouméa, 1939–1942, 1946–1953).

After further interruptions during World War II, service resumed post-Liberation in 1944 with Le Ville d'Amiens, Le Sagittaire, and L'Eridan. In the 1950s, the Nouméa route via Panama extended to Sydney, with older ships replaced by two larger, faster (about 19 knots), and more comfortable mixed liners built for the Marseille-Nouméa line: Le Calédonien (II) (1952–1972) and Le Tahitien (1952–1971). They operated six voyages annually, departing Marseille every 60 days. By 1972, outcompeted by air travel, both the main and secondary lines were discontinued, with Messageries Maritimes (later CGM from 1977, then CMA CGM after 1996) focusing solely on freight transport.

==== Coastal service (Tour de Côte) ====
Following France's annexation of New Caledonia, with road networks developing slowly, connections between the capital Port-de-France (later Nouméa) and the interior of Grande Terre or other islands relied heavily on coastal shipping. Initially operated by private entrepreneurs, a subsidized public service, the Tour de Côte, began in 1872. It was first managed by the Compagnie de la Nouvelle-Calédonie under banker André Marchand and entrepreneurs like John Higginson, using the 30-ton steam schooner La Dépêche. In 1877, the Société des transports maritimes de la Nouvelle-Calédonie (STMNC), led by Australian merchant William Morgan (Premier of South Australia from 1878–1881), took over with the 65-ton steam schooner La Croix du Sud, followed by larger coasters Nouméa and Ne Oblie. In 1886, New Caledonian shipowner Arthur Pelletier (mayor of Nouméa from 1874–1879) acquired the service, renaming it the Société calédonienne des transports à vapeur (SCTV), operating the 381-ton steam brig-schooner Ocean Queen and Mac Gregor.

In 1890, the SCTV lost the contract to an Australian, Stilling, who withdrew amid local protests. The service was then taken over by a new joint-stock company, the Syndicat calédonien pour le développement de la navigation et du commerce français dans le Pacifique, controlled by the Jouve company (using Australian-chartered ships Otway, Katoomba, and later Mangana) until 1896, then by Établissements Ballande. In 1907, Ballande partnered with other local firms to form the Union commerciale et de navigation calédonienne (UCNC), purchasing the Emu. The UCNC was dissolved in 1923, replaced by the Société du tour de côte (STC), which expanded with three ships (Emu, Mawatta, and Néo-Hébridais) and, with the Loyalty Islands society, operated Athalaï and Loyauté to Lifou, Maré, and Ouvéa. Despite improvements in ship capacity and travel times, passenger complaints grew, compounded by competition from road transport and the 1930s economic crisis. In 1936, the colony's General Council refused to increase STC subsidies, canceled the contract, and chose not to renew it.

Subsequently, domestic passenger maritime transport focused on the Loyalty Islands and Île des Pins, operated by private companies. From the late 1990s, public authorities invested through their holding companies (PromoSud for the South Province and SODIL for the Loyalty Islands Province). The Armement loyaltien (a SODIL subsidiary) acquired the Betico, which was sold in 2004 to SudÎles (50% SODIL, 50% PromoSud) and replaced by the Betico 2 in 2009.

=== Port infrastructure ===
While most communes have sea access with varying facilities (launch ramps, pontoons, or wharves), New Caledonia has only six true ports: two public ports under the Port Autonome de la Nouvelle-Calédonie (Nouméa and Wé) and four private industrial ports (Népoui, Vavouto, and Prony).

==== Port Autonome de la Nouvelle-Calédonie ====
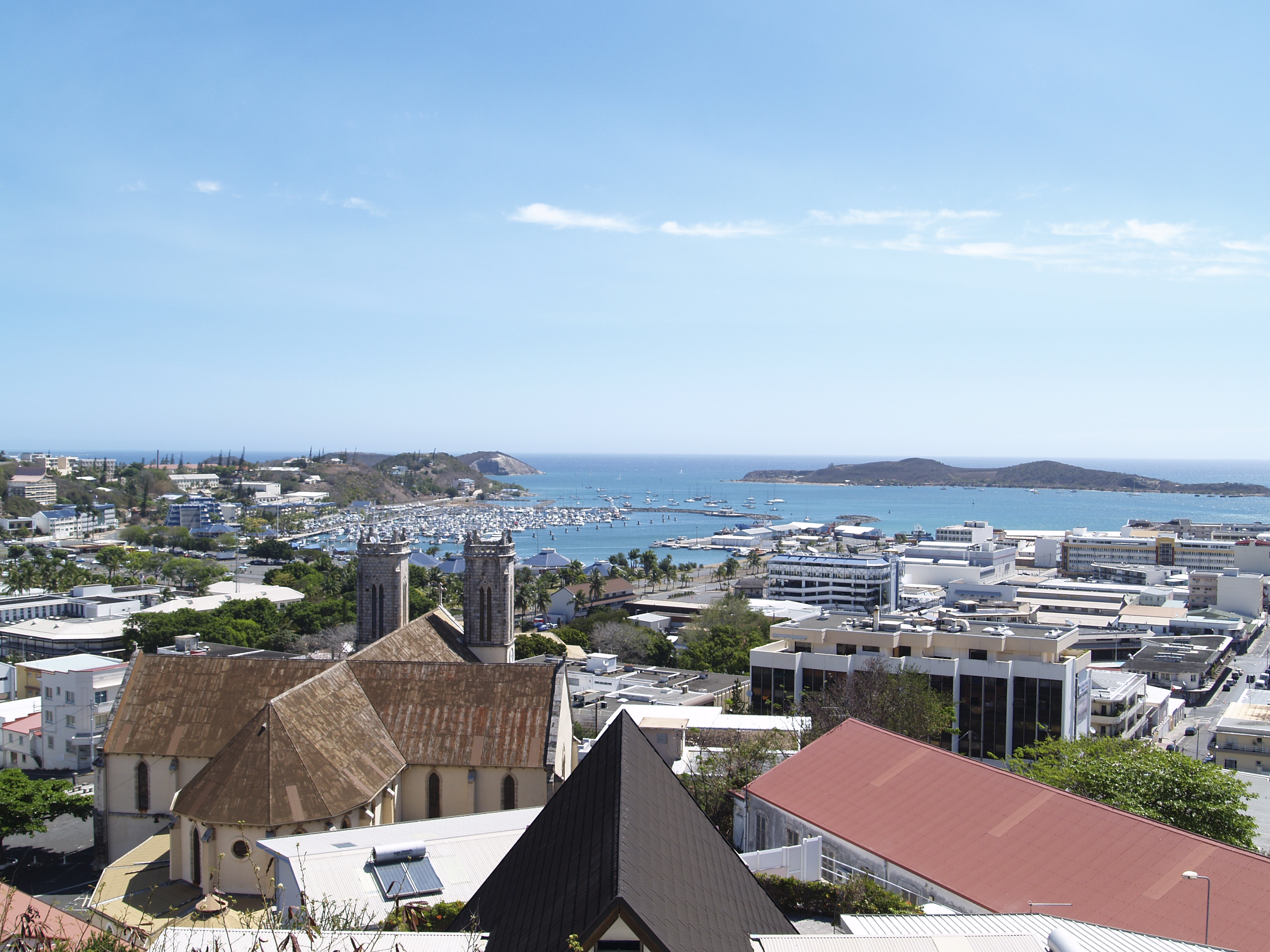
View of the small harbor (right) and Baie de la Moselle (left) in Nouméa, from Sémaphore Hill.

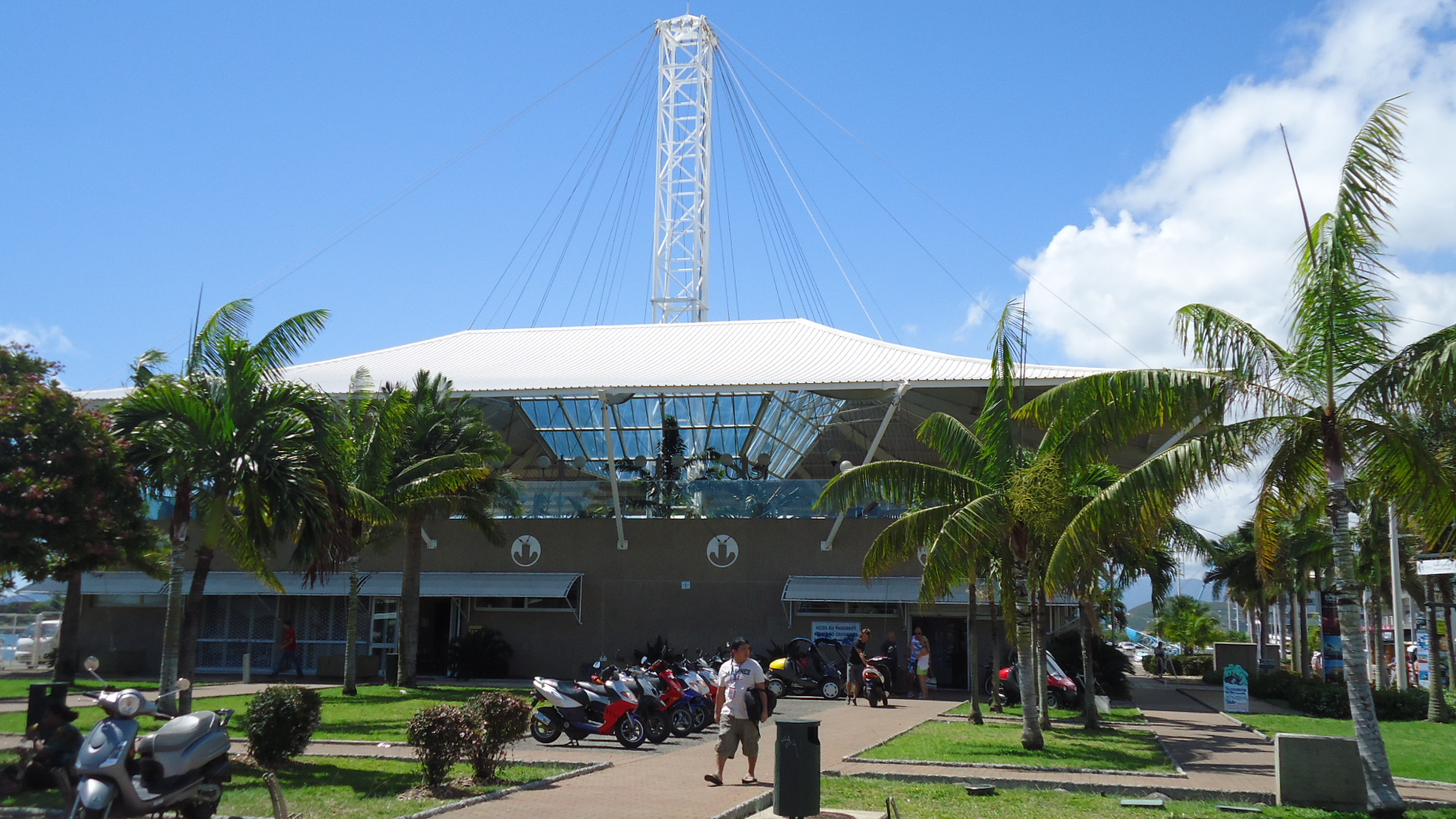
View of the maritime terminal in Nouméa, 2013.

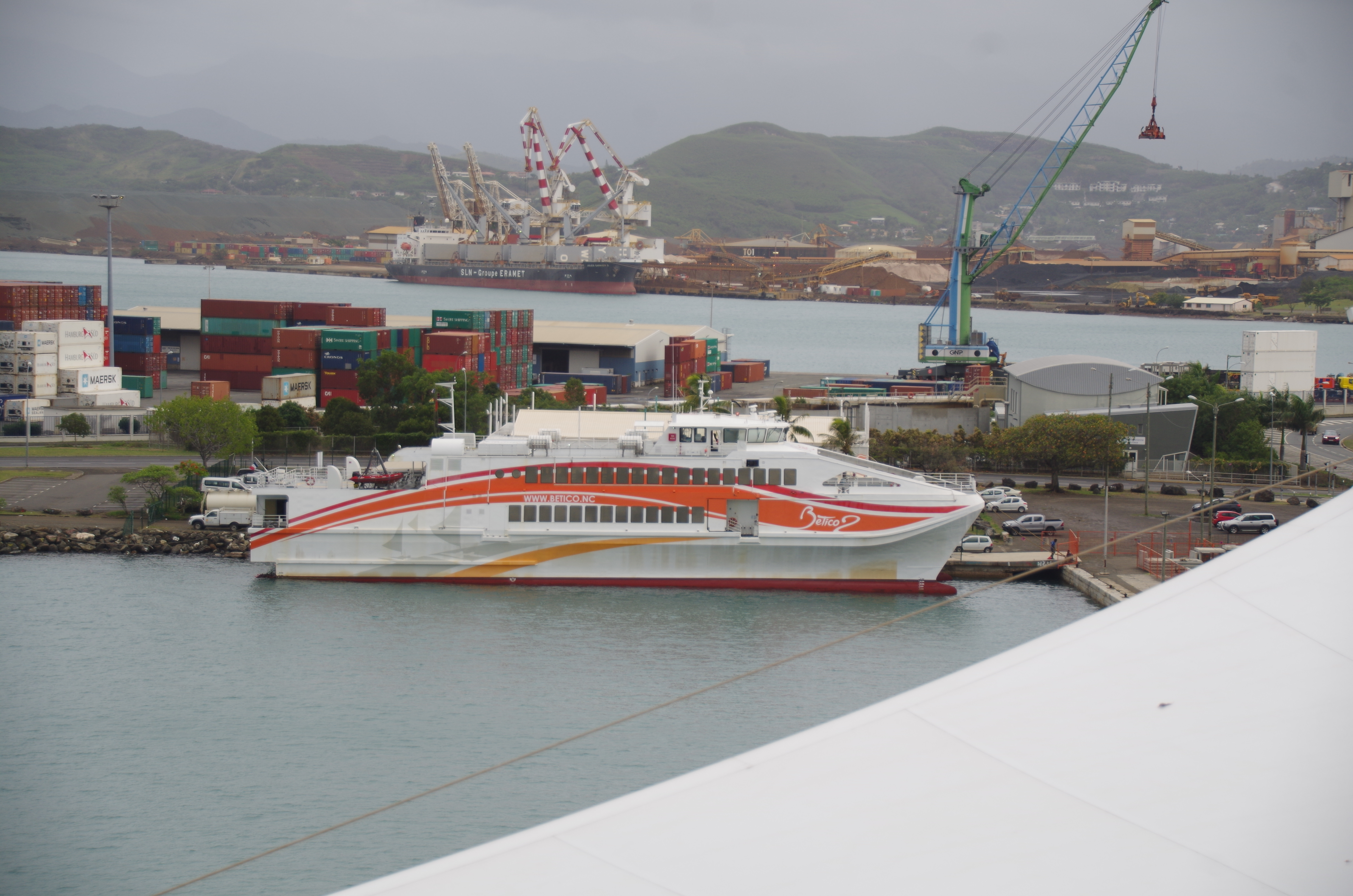
View of the Betico 2 at the FED quay (foreground), the Port Autonome (midground), and the ore carriers’ quay serving the SLN factory in Doniambo (background), 2018.

The Port Autonome de la Nouvelle-Calédonie is a public industrial and commercial establishment managing the administration, maintenance, and operation of two ports in New Caledonia, with the capacity to support other territorial port infrastructure.

===== Port of Nouméa =====
The Port of Nouméa has been certified under the ISPS Code since July 2005. It comprises two main sites on either side of the embankment connecting downtown and Nouville:

- The large harbor, spanning 800 hectares around the bay of the same name, hosts industrial port facilities for freight transport:
  - The international commercial quay, commonly called the "Port Autonome," is 750 m long with a 10.3 m draft, accommodating large container ships. It includes a 45-hectare customs zone with two 5,500 m² docks, a hazardous goods yard, a flour mill with six silos, and a two-silo storage center. The rear port area houses freight forwarders and road hauliers.
  - The fisheries, at the entrance to Nouville, feature a 180 m quay, 6,000 m² of cold storage, and 90,000 m² of open space.
  - Hydrocarbon reception and storage occur in Baie des Dames near Koumourou, northwest of the harbor, at the western end of the Ducos Peninsula.
  - The Numbo cement plant, slightly east of Baie des Dames in Ducos, has a jetty for clinker supply.
  - At the harbor's end on the Doniambo Peninsula, private quays of the Eramet-SLN metallurgical company handle nickel ore unloading and matte/ferro-nickel loading.
- The small harbor, covering 210 hectares, focuses on passenger maritime transport, encircling the small harbor and Baie de la Moselle:
  - The FED quay (named for funding from the European Development Fund), 70 m long, hosts visiting vessels (military, private yachts, scientific ships) and small cruise ships. It lies on the south coast of the embankment to Nouville, behind the Maritime History Museum.
  - The Volontaires quay, 80 m long, is the oldest (built in stone in 1875) and northernmost part of the Jules-Ferry quay, at the northeast corner of the small harbor. It houses the islands' maritime terminal, serving major passenger transporters like Betico 2 and Aremiti 4.
  - The long-haul or Jules-Ferry quay proper, along Jules-Ferry Street at the eastern edge of downtown, is about 420 m long and primarily serves luxury cruise liners behind the maritime terminal.
  - The coasters' quay, 300 m long, extends southeast from the Jules-Ferry quay, with a 2,000 m² dock, 20,000 m² of open space, and a maritime terminal. It is the base for the two main ro-ro ships, Havannah and Laura III.
  - The scientific quay, about 150 m long, north of Port Moselle and south of downtown, primarily hosts oceanographic vessels from the IRD or French Research Institute for Exploitation of the Sea.
  - The pilotage station, adjacent to the scientific quay, has an 80 m quay (mainly for small coastal fishermen) and a 30 m pontoon for pilot boats.
  - Port Moselle, New Caledonia's largest marina, houses the harbor master's office.
  - Two slipways and an arming quay are on the eastern coast of Nouville.

===== Port of Wé =====
The port of Wé on Lifou includes 60 m of quay, a 4.5 m draft, 12,000 m² of open space, 450 m² of docks, a 150 m² passenger shelter, and a jetty for passenger traffic (e.g., Betico 2 or Havannah).

==== Private industrial ports ====
Three private ports, not directly managed by the Port Autonome de la Nouvelle-Calédonie, support industrial freight transport at Népoui, Vavouto, and Prony.

===== Port of Népoui =====
Népoui, a mining village of about 1,200 residents in Poya on the east coast of the North Province, supports the SLN's Kopéto massif operations since 1969. The private port, owned by SLN, handles nickel ore loading and hydrocarbon unloading for Enercal's gas power plant.

===== Port of Vavouto =====
The port of Vavouto, in Voh on the west coast of the North Province, still under construction but partially operational since 2008, serves the Koniambo Nickel factory (scheduled for commissioning in 2012). Managed by Koniambo Nickel SA (51% SMSP, a SOFINOR subsidiary of the North Province, and 49% Swiss Xstrata), it includes a 150 m long, 45 m wide, 12 m draft main international quay (VP1, operational since 2010) and a 20 m long, 25 m wide, 4.5 m deep construction quay (VP2).

===== Port of Prony =====
The port of Prony, in Prony Bay at the border of Mont-Dore and Yaté in the southeast of Grande Terre in the South Province, operational since 2008, serves the Southern factory. Managed by Vale Inco Nouvelle-Calédonie, a subsidiary of Brazilian Vale, it comprises two L-shaped quays:

- The general cargo quay, 90 m long with an 11 m draft, handles unloading of various goods and hydrocarbons and loading of finished products in containers.
- The bulk solids quay, 177 m long with a maximum 12.2 m draft, connected to the factory by a 3 km conveyor, receives coal for the power plant, sulfur for acid production, and limestone for effluent neutralization.

Additional facilities include a wharf for barges and the personnel ferry (Nyile Djeu), an office area with a passenger office for phytosanitary and customs authorities, and two terminals for containers and hydrocarbon storage.

== Passenger transport ==
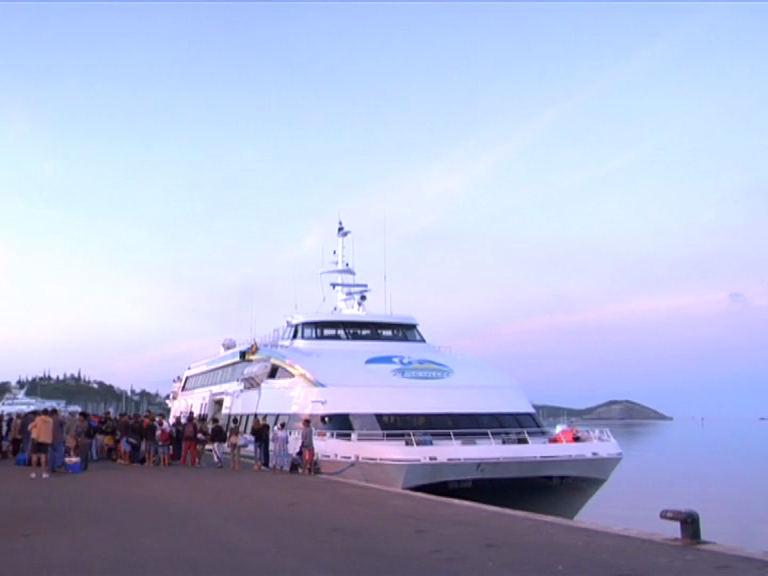
The Aremiti 4 at the Jules-Ferry quay in the port of Nouméa.

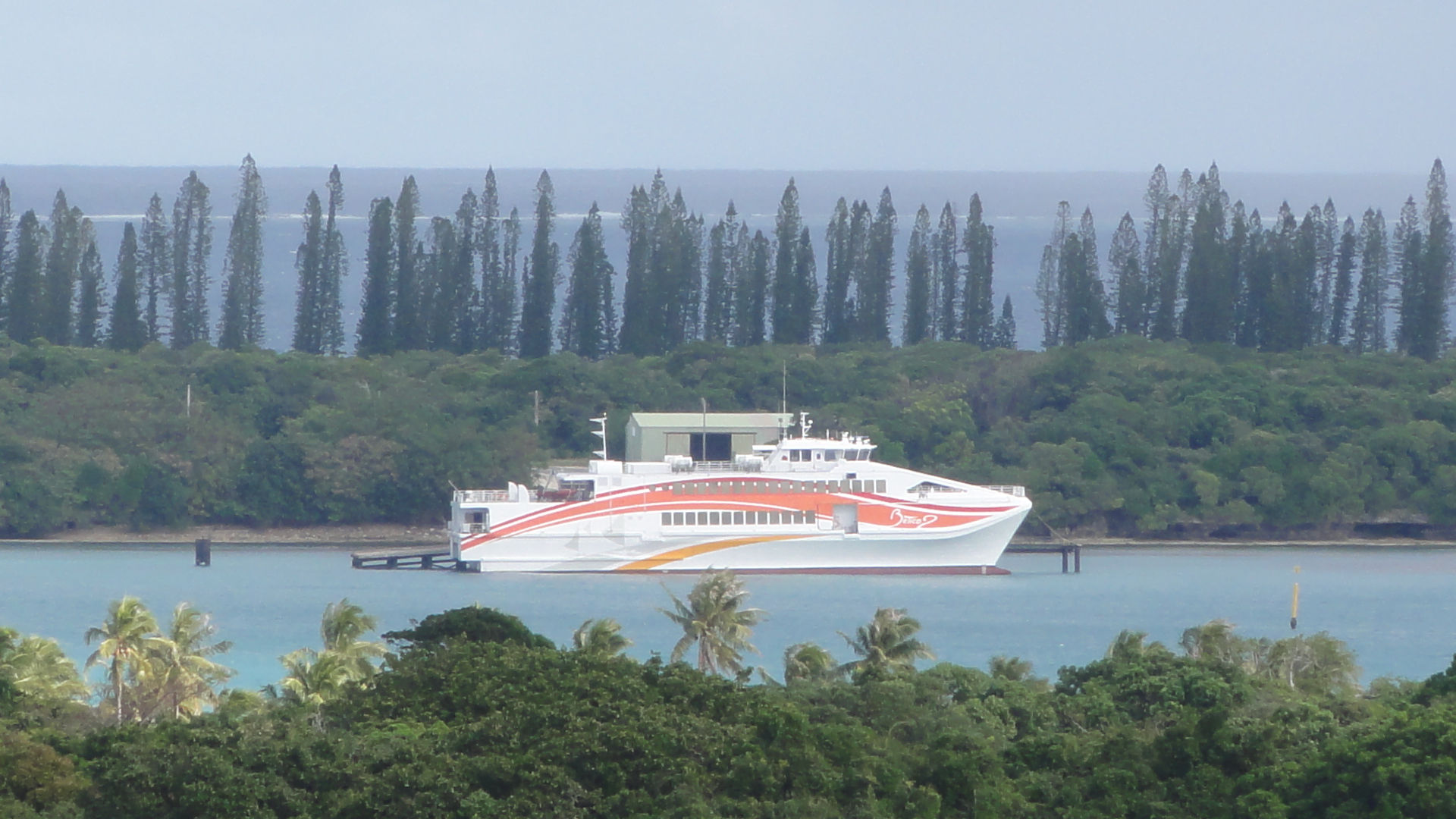
Betico 2 at Île des Pins.

Several private and public operators provide inter-island passenger transport services in New Caledonia.

=== Inter-island transport companies and vessels ===
==== Private Companies ====
- Trans Express Nord operates maritime passenger transport between Koumac, Poum, and the Belep Islands, with two weekly trips by the catamaran Seabreeze (capacity: 120 passengers and 6 tons of cargo).
- Compagnie maritime des îles (CMI), since 1995, provides passenger and freight transport (including vehicles), often at night or evening, to the Loyalty Islands (weekly), Île des Pins (biweekly), and Vanuatu (monthly), using the ro-ro vessel Havannah (capacity: 1,000 tons).
- The operator Île des Pins Ferry (IDPF), a subsidiary of the New Caledonian transport group Arc-en-ciel, chartered the catamaran Aremiti 4 (30–36 knots, 435 passengers, 20 cars) until 2011. The Aremiti 4 operated three weekly trips to Île des Pins and two to the Prony site.
- Vale Inco Nouvelle-Calédonie has operated the catamaran Nyie Djeu since March 2010 for personnel transport to the port of Prony and the southern factory site.

==== Public company ====
- SudÎles, owned by SODIL (Loyalty Islands Province), operates the high-speed vessel Betico 2 (31 knots, 358 passengers, 15 tons of cargo or 10 cars) since 2009. It conducts three weekly trips to the Loyalty Islands (3 hours 30 minutes to Maré, 4 hours 30 minutes to Lifou, 5 hours 30 minutes to Ouvéa) via Île des Pins (2 hours 30 minutes). Designed for high-speed travel without causing seasickness, it addressed criticisms of its predecessor, Betico (locally nicknamed Vomico).

=== Tourist transport ===
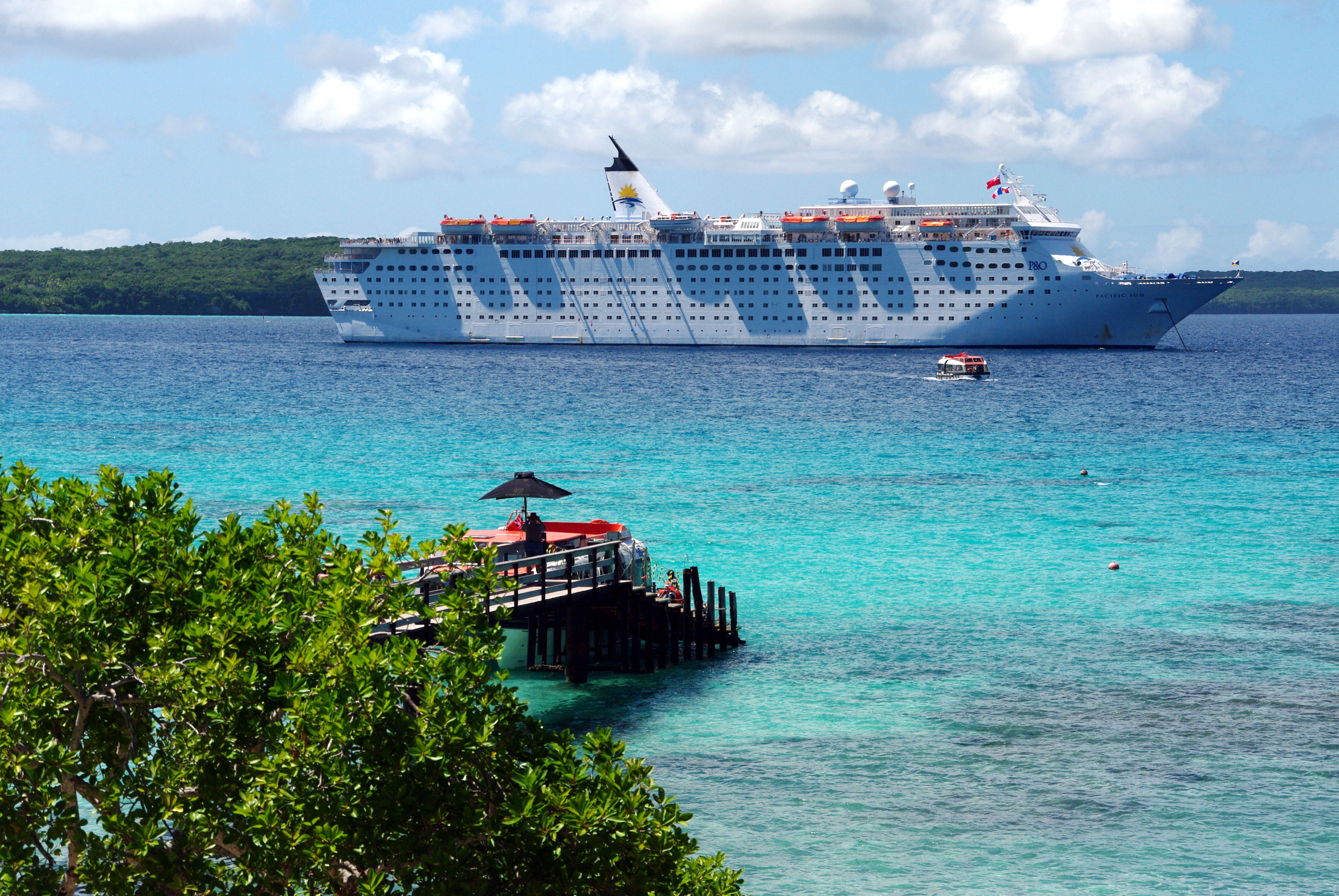
The cruise ship Pacific Sun off the coast of Lifou, September 2009.

Maritime tourism has grown significantly since the Australian company P&O Cruises designated Nouméa as its main port of call for South Pacific cruises, expanding stops to the Loyalty Islands. Its cruise ships include Pacific Sun, Pacific Dawn, Pacific Jewel, and Pacific Pearl. Other operators, such as American companies Princess Cruises (with Sun Princess, Dawn Princess, and Sea Princess), Holland America Line (with MS Amsterdam, Volendam, and Zaandam), American-Norwegian Royal Caribbean International (with Rhapsody of the Seas and Radiance of the Seas), and Australian Coral Princess Cruises (with Oceanic Discoverer), also conduct regular tours in New Caledonian waters. The number of cruise passengers visiting New Caledonia has steadily increased, surpassing traditional (non-cruise) tourists:

Number of Cruise Passengers and Ships by Year
Year	1996	1997	1998	1999	2000	2001	2002	2003	2004	2005	2006	2007	2008	2009
Passengers	45,665	31,700	21,351	48,701	48,579	50,671	54,925	64,273	77,115	81,215	118,898	124,467	152,250	131,231
Ships	65	40	23	60	59	39	44	57	64	60	87	83	89	79

Cruise passengers are primarily Australian (78.43% in 2008), followed by New Zealander (7.59%), with nearly all being English-speaking (including 2.87% British and 1.93% American in 2008). Cruise tourism involves short stays (up to two days per stop), with visits limited to specific locations (Nouméa, Hienghène, Poum, Ouvéa, Lifou, Île des Pins, and Casy Islet). It generates no revenue for the hotel industry, as passengers stay on their ships, but supports local businesses such as souvenir shops, museums, cultural centers, monuments, and leisure facilities like the Aquarium des Lagons or the Michel-Corbasson Zoological and Forest Park in Nouméa, as well as organized tours like the "Petits trains touristiques" in Nouméa. The peak cruise season runs from October to February, with over 10 cruise ships per month in 2008, peaking at 15 in December.

Within the New Caledonian lagoon, several companies provide tourist transport between Nouméa and nearby islets, with three main destinations:

- Duck Island (Îlot Canard), at the entrance to Anse Vata south of Nouméa, accessible via Plages Loisirs' "taxi-boats" from Anse Vata beach or by sail.
- Maître Islet, 4 nautical miles (7.5 km) south-southwest of Port Moselle and 2.5 nautical miles (4.5 km) from Anse Vata, aligned with Duck Island, hosts the Escapade Island Resort, the only islet with a hotel. It is accessible via Plages Loisirs' taxi-boats from Anse Vata, the Escapade hotel shuttle from Port Moselle, or private vessels.
- Amédée Islet, a major tourist site due to its 19th-century lighthouse and popularity for scuba diving, located 13 nautical miles (24 km) south-southeast of Port Moselle and 10.5 nautical miles south of Anse Vata. It is primarily served by Mary D Enterprises (established in 1980 for day trips), with the Mary D Dolphin (184 passengers, 20 knots) and Mary D Princess (132 passengers, 20 knots) departing from Port Moselle. The Amédée Diving Club, based on the islet, operates two boats, including a 20-passenger catamaran stationed at Port Moselle. Private vessels can also access the islet.

== Freight transport ==
The sea is the primary mode of freight transport in New Caledonia, both domestically and internationally. Nouméa serves as the hub for imported goods, the main export port (though not the only one), and the central point for domestic maritime routes. In 2009, the port of Nouméa handled 4.615 million tons of maritime freight.

=== Domestic Freight Transport ===
In 2009, 2.996 million tons of goods passed through Nouméa for domestic maritime transport, primarily (2.906 million tons) products unloaded from the "Brousse" (rural areas). The majority was nickel ore (2.888 million tons), transported by bulk carrier from major mining centers (Koumac, Kouaoua, Canala, etc.) to the SLN factory docks at Doniambo in Nouméa for processing into ferro-nickels and mattes. Sand was another resource shipped to Nouméa until 2008, with a decline in the 2000s (94,000 tons in 2000, 55,000 in 2005, 18,000 in 2008, and none in 2009). The remaining 18,000 tons consisted of miscellaneous goods (vehicles, mail, food, timber) transported by cargo ships from the Loyalty Islands, Île des Pins, or Belep Islands. In the opposite direction, 90,000 tons of goods were loaded in Nouméa in 2009 for the "Brousse," mainly consumer products and hydrocarbons (80,000 tons by cargo ships, 10,000 tons by tankers) destined for inhabited islands outside Grande Terre.

Key companies operating inter-island freight vessels include:

- Tramanord, with its barge Béléma Nénéma (30-ton capacity) between Poum and the Belep Islands.
- CMI, with its mixed ro-ro vessel Havannah (1,000-ton capacity), serving the Loyalty Islands (near-monopoly on fuel supply), Île des Pins, and Vanuatu.
- Société de transport de l'intérieur et des îles (STIles), with its ro-ro vessel Laura III (2,300-ton deadweight) to the Loyalty Islands.

=== International freight transport ===
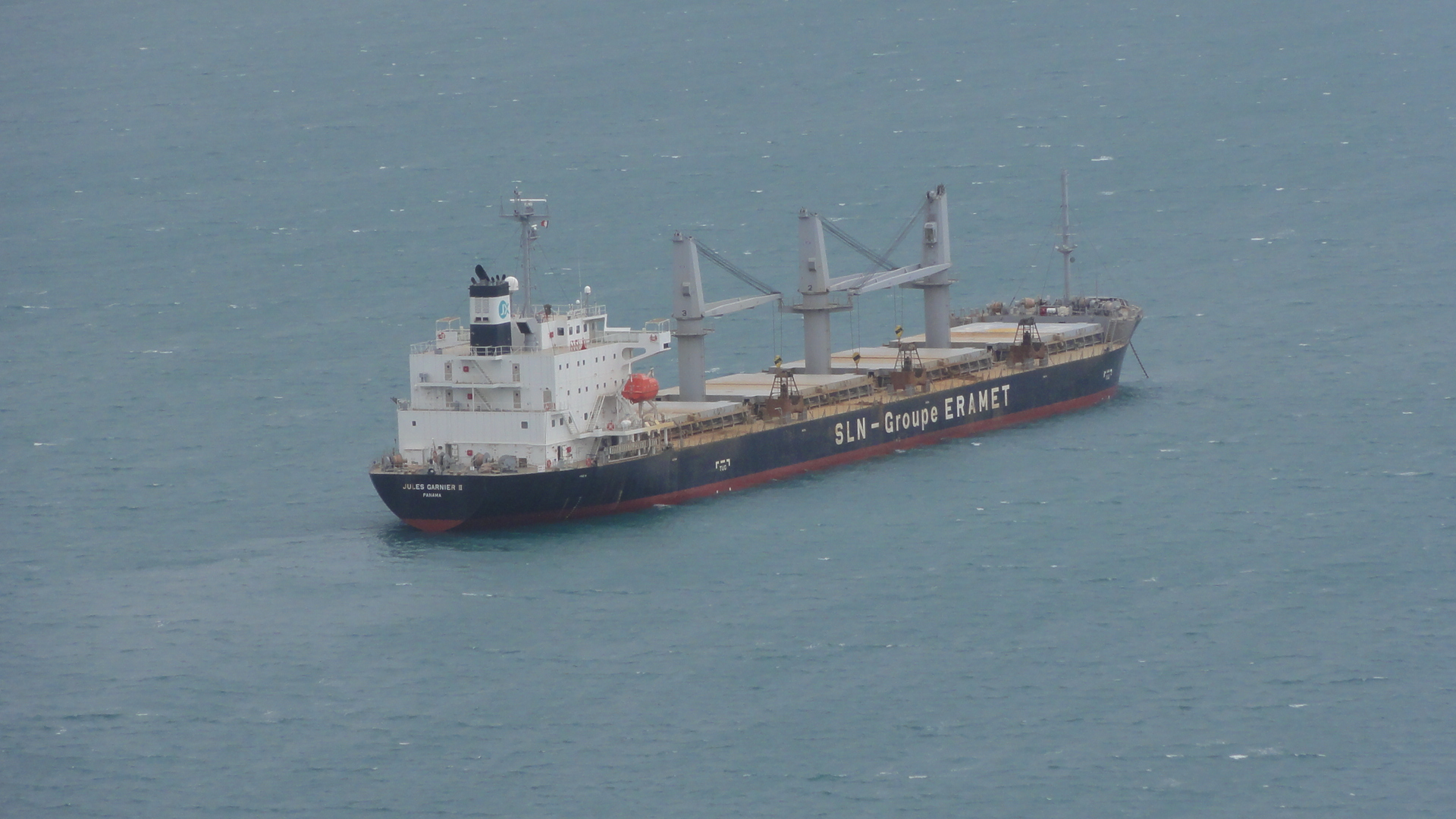
A SLN bulk carrier approaching Nouméa.

In 2009, 1.619 million tons of goods for international maritime traffic were loaded or unloaded at the port of Nouméa, accounting for 29.9% of the 5.421 million tons handled by New Caledonian ports that year. Nouméa is primarily an import port, with 1.399 million tons unloaded in 2009 (82.98% of maritime imports), including 621,000 tons at the SLN docks at Doniambo (mainly solid minerals, chemicals, and hydrocarbons), 513,000 tons at the autonomous port's main docks, 183,000 tons (mostly hydrocarbons) at Baie des Dames, and 82,000 tons at Numbo. Other import ports include Népoui and, since 2008, the industrial-port facilities serving the new metallurgical plants at Prony (Southern Factory) and Vavouto (Koniambo), which handled 288,000 tons in 2009. Imported products include petroleum products (650,000 tons), building materials (200,000 tons), solid minerals (180,000 tons), food (175,000 tons), manufactured goods (150,000 tons, including 30,000 tons of vehicles), chemicals (25,000 tons), metallurgical products (20,000 tons), and plant/animal products (10,000 tons).

Of the 3.735 million tons of goods loaded in New Caledonia in 2009, 3.515 million tons (94%) were unprocessed nickel, chrome, or cobalt ore exported directly from "Brousse" loading centers. The remainder, shipped from Nouméa, included metallurgical products (150,000 tons, ferro-nickels and mattes from the SLN factory at Doniambo) and food (less than 50,000 tons, such as shrimp increasingly demanded by restaurants in Europe and Japan).

== Air transport ==
The development of air transport in the second half of the 20th century reduced New Caledonia's isolation and travel times. Domestically, however, air transport struggles to compete with road and inter-island maritime services.

=== History ===
==== Early civil aviation ====
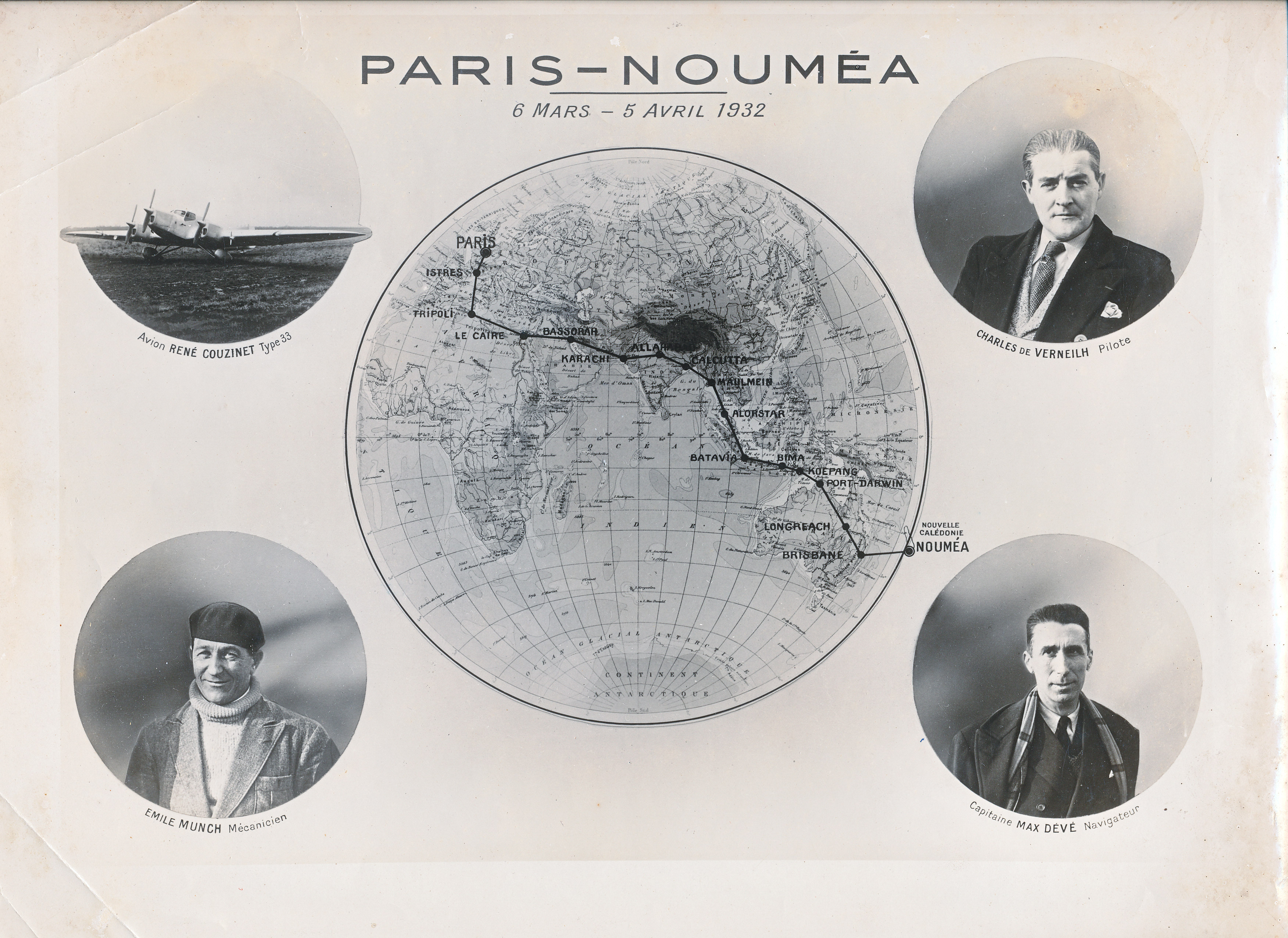
Photomontage of the 1932 Paris-Nouméa raid.

The first external air link, also the first airmail flight, occurred on November 21, 1931, between Ouaco (in present-day Kaala-Gomen) and Rockhampton, Queensland, flown by Australian pilot Victor Roffey in the Golden Eagle, a Tiger Moth biplane, in 11 hours 20 minutes at an average speed of 135 km/h, carrying 137 letters, a liter of New Caledonian coffee, and two bottles of champagne.

In 1932, New Caledonia was reached by air from mainland France for the first time. The Couzinet 33 Biarritz trimotor, designed for mail transport, departed Le Bourget on March 9, 1932, with pilots Charles de Verneilh-Puyrazeau, Max Dévé, and mechanic Émile Munch. It landed near the La Tontouta River on April 5 after 20 stops. A sculpture at Nouméa–La Tontouta International Airport commemorates this feat.

Following these pioneering efforts, the Caledonian Aero Club was founded in 1934 by Henri Martinet, Jules Calimbre, Auguste Mercier, Lucien Beaumont, and Gaston Constans. In January 1936, the club acquired a Potez 60 biplane, named Le Cagou, through public subscription, and established the Charles-de-Verneilh airfield in Dumbéa. Le Cagou was lost at sea in June 1936 during a reconnaissance flight near Hienghène, though the pilots survived. A Caudron C.510 Pélican was acquired but destroyed on its first flight. Henri Martinet, after earning his pilot's license in Paris in 1937, purchased a Caudron C.600 Aiglon, named L'Aiglon, and used it for the club's first aerial tour to the Loyalty Islands and Pouébo.

On March 23, 1939, Martinet flew L'Aiglon from Nouméa to Sydney, carrying 6 kg of mail, joined by Paul Kleim from Espiritu Santo. The mail was transferred to Australian Post in Bundaberg, reaching France in 14 days, marking the first fully air-transported mail from New Caledonia. The flight reached Le Bourget on May 20, 1939, after 52 stops, the longest straight-line journey by a French amateur crew at the time.

In July 1940, Pan Am established a regular airmail route to Nouméa via Boeing 314 flying boats, as a stop on its San Francisco–Auckland route. Passenger services began in November 1941 but were halted after the Attack on Pearl Harbor on December 7, 1941.

==== American infrastructure development ====
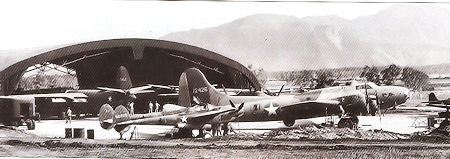
American military aircraft at La Tontouta in August 1942.

During the Pacific War, New Caledonia became a key U.S. military airbase, leading to significant airfield development. Two airfields on the west coast of Grande Terre, initially developed by the FAFL, were expanded by the U.S.: Plaine des Gaïacs (between Poya and Pouembout) and La Tontouta (near Païta). Plaine des Gaïacs, with two runways, was used until 1943 but abandoned post-war. La Tontouta became the primary hub by October 1943, with two runways and additional facilities like Magenta and a seaplane base at Nouméa.

==== Flying boat era ====
Post-World War II, air services resumed using U.S.-built infrastructure, with flying boats dominating until the early 1950s. Pan Am restarted its Honolulu–Sydney route via Nouméa in 1945, ending in 1951. Qantas served Nouméa from Sydney with Short Empire, Sandringham, and Catalina flying boats until 1954, then switched to Douglas DC-4s landing at La Tontouta.

In 1946, the French company TRAPAS operated Catalina and Grumman Widgeon flying boats to Port-Vila, Espiritu Santo, and Papeete via Wallis, Fiji, Samoa, and Cook Islands, until a cyclone destroyed its fleet in 1950.

==== Growth of commercial air services ====
After 1954, La Tontouta became the primary international gateway. Air France began a Paris–Nouméa route in 1949 with Douglas DC-4s, later upgraded to Lockheed Constellations, Douglas DC-6s, Douglas DC-8s, and Boeing 747s. By the 1950s, air travel surpassed maritime transport, carrying 11,419 passengers in 1959 compared to 4,970 by sea.

Air Calédonie International (Aircalin), established in 1983, expanded regional services with Boeing 737s, Airbus A310s, and Airbus A330-200s. It now operates most routes from Nouméa, including to Tokyo, Osaka, Seoul, Sydney, and Papeete, often in codeshare with Air France, Qantas, Air New Zealand, and Air Vanuatu.

=== International air transport ===
==== A modest but growing international airport ====
La Tontouta, a Category A ICAO airport since 1969, is managed by the New Caledonia Chamber of Commerce and Industry and serves as a mixed civil-military facility. It underwent expansion from 2008 to 2012 to double its capacity to 21,700 m² and handle four aircraft simultaneously. Despite lower passenger numbers than Tahiti or Nadi, it has seen steady growth:

Annual Results for Nouméa–La Tontouta Airport (2000–2009)
Year	2000	2001	2002	2003	2004	2005	2006	2007	2008	2009
Passengers	359,839	348,025	359,293	371,247	388,308	409,096	415,813	445,305	457,387	462,698
Freight (t)	5,244	5,061	5,094	5,197	5,200	5,566	5,451	5,606	6,220	5,809
Commercial Movements	3,111	3,118	3,349	3,128	3,330	3,254	3,290	3,440	3,661	3,730

In 2009, Aircalin carried 335,313 passengers (73% of total traffic at La Tontouta), followed by Qantas (60,659), Air Austral (27,311), Air New Zealand (21,621), and Air Vanuatu (6,662).

==== Main origins and destinations ====
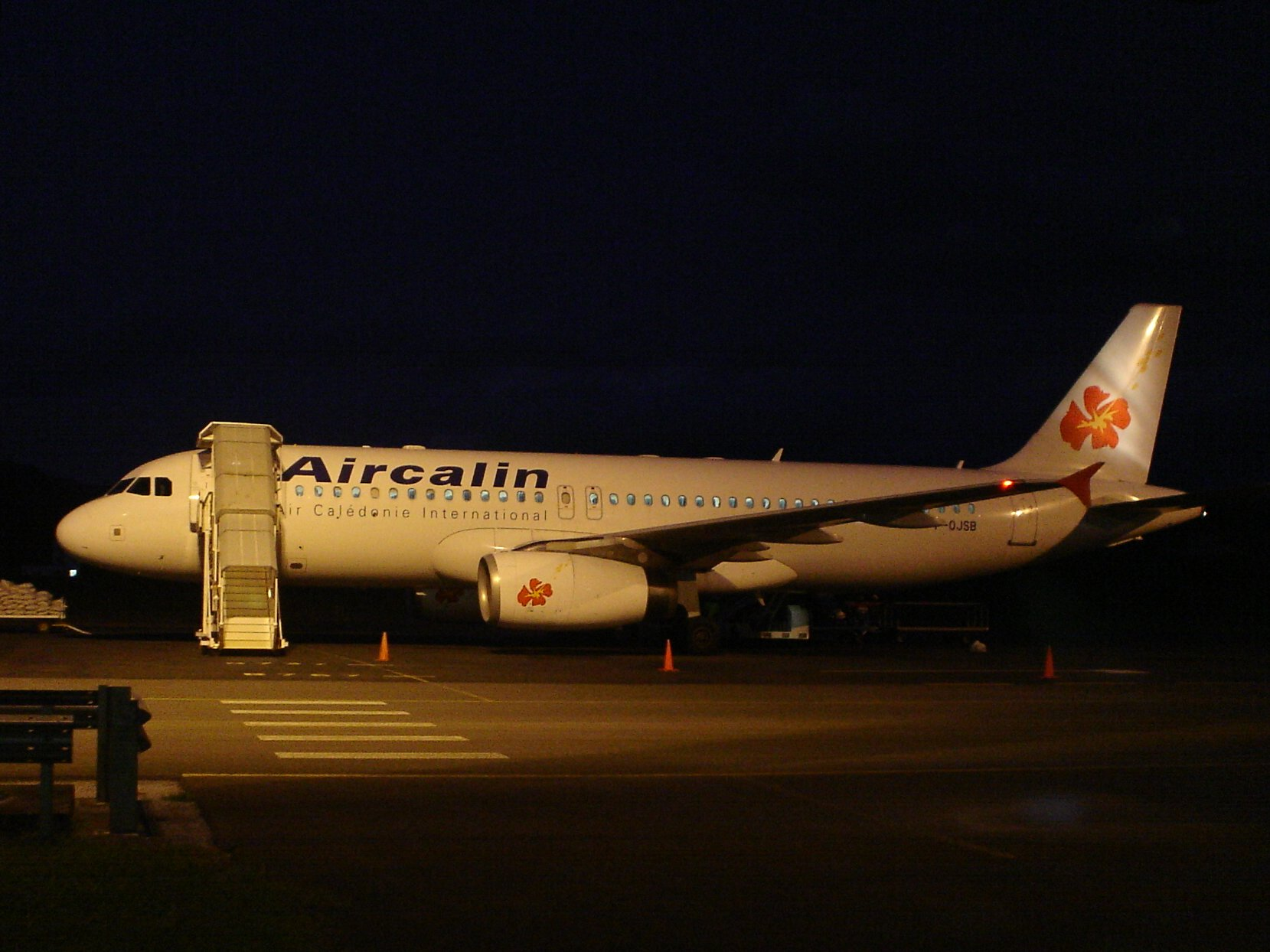
A320-232 F-OJSB of Aircalin at Port-Vila.

Paris-Charles de Gaulle Airport is a key origin and destination, serving tourists (27,335 of 99,379 air arrivals in 2009), expatriates (4,848), and returning students/residents (37,072). Flights to Paris take 23–30 hours, costing €1,000–€2,000 round-trip, via:

- Northeast Asia (Tokyo, Osaka, Seoul) with Aircalin, Air France, KLM, or Finnair (fastest route, 23–30 hours).
- Australia and Southeast Asia (Singapore, Jakarta, Bangkok, Hong Kong) via Sydney, with Qantas, British Airways, or Cathay Pacific (longest, ~30 hours).
- Indian Ocean route via Sydney and La Réunion with Air Austral (27,311 passengers in 2009).

Other key destinations include:

- Australia: 18,567 tourists and 41,821 resident return trips in 2009, with Sydney (6 weekly flights) and Brisbane (3 weekly flights).
- Japan: 18,926 tourists in 2009, though declining since 2005.
- New Zealand: 14,478 resident return trips and 6,651 tourists in 2009, with 4 weekly flights to Auckland.
- Wallis and Futuna, Vanuatu, Indonesia, Vietnam, and French Polynesia for community ties.

==== International freight ====
Freight at La Tontouta (5,000–6,000 tons annually) includes perishable goods (fruits, vegetables, dairy from Australia and New Zealand) and mail (986 tons in 2009).

=== Domestic air transport ===
In 2009, Nouméa Magenta Airport handled 370,056 passengers, with a 6% growth from 2008. Air Calédonie carried 96.2% (356,043 passengers), with smaller operators handling 14,013.

==== Main domestic operator ====
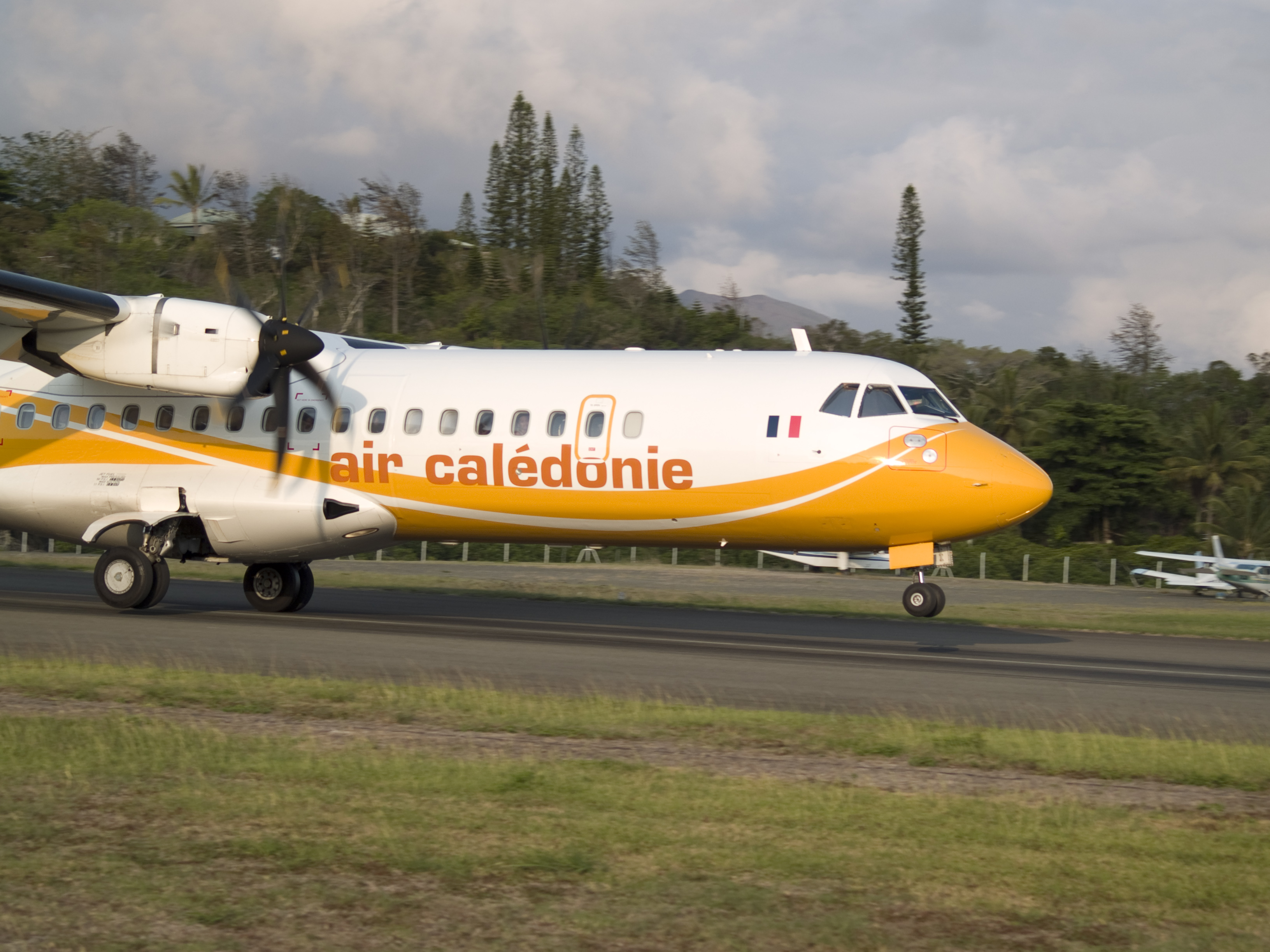
ATR 72-500 of Air Calédonie at Nouméa Magenta Airport.

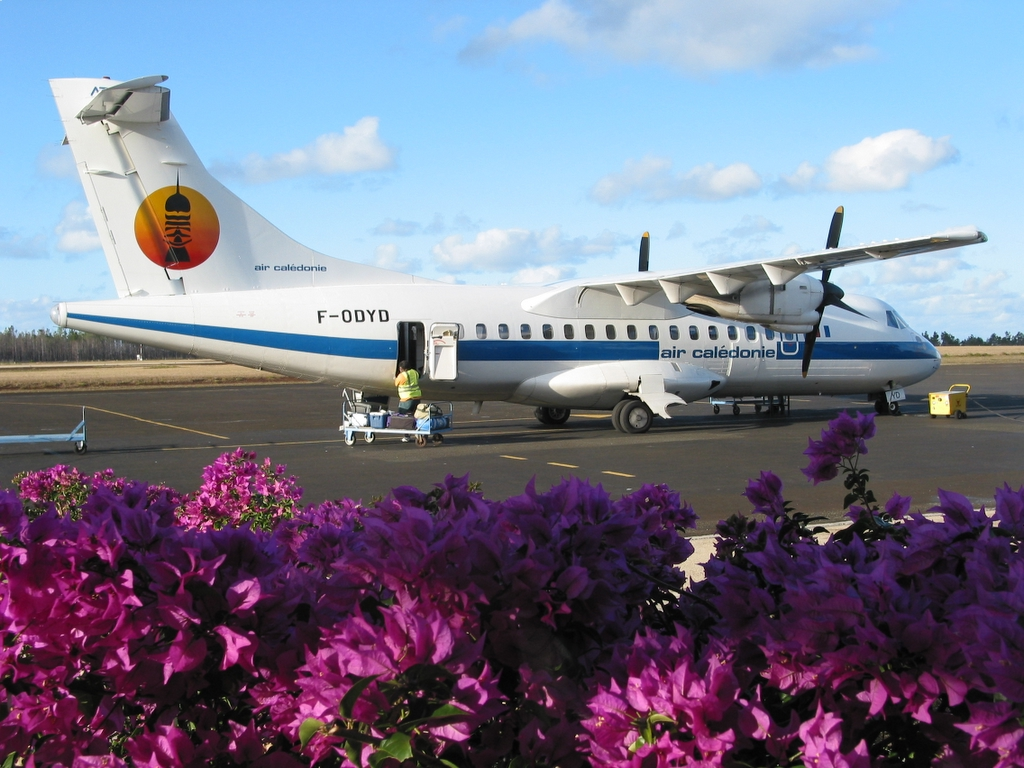
ATR 42-320 of Air Calédonie loading at Moue Airport, Île des Pins.

Air Calédonie, based at Magenta, serves nine local airports, seven directly:

- Loyalty Islands Province: 73.6% of passengers (262,025 in 2009), driven by rural migration to Greater Nouméa.
  - Wanaham Airport, Lifou (40 minutes, 129,737 passengers, 36.4% of non-Magenta traffic).
  - La Roche Airport, Maré (40 minutes, 65,644 passengers).
  - Ouloup Airport, Ouvéa (40 minutes, 64,435 passengers).
  - Tiga Airport, Tiga (1 hour via Maré or Lifou, 2,209 passengers).
- South Province:
  - Moué Airport, Île des Pins (30 minutes, 88,431 passengers, 24.8% of traffic).
- North Province: Only 5,587 passengers (1.6%), but growing due to Koné Airport.
  - Koné Airport (40 minutes, 3,517 passengers in 2009).
  - Touho Airport (40 minutes, 1,237 passengers).
  - Koumac Airport (1 hour 20 minutes, 643 passengers).
  - Waala Airport, Belep Islands (2 hours 25 minutes via Koumac, 190 passengers).

Air Calédonie is owned by the Government of New Caledonia (50.28%), Loyalty Islands Province (43.31%), private shareholders (4.32%), and Air France (2.09%). It modernized its fleet in 2006–2007 with ATR 42-500 and ATR 72-500 aircraft.

==== Other domestic services ====
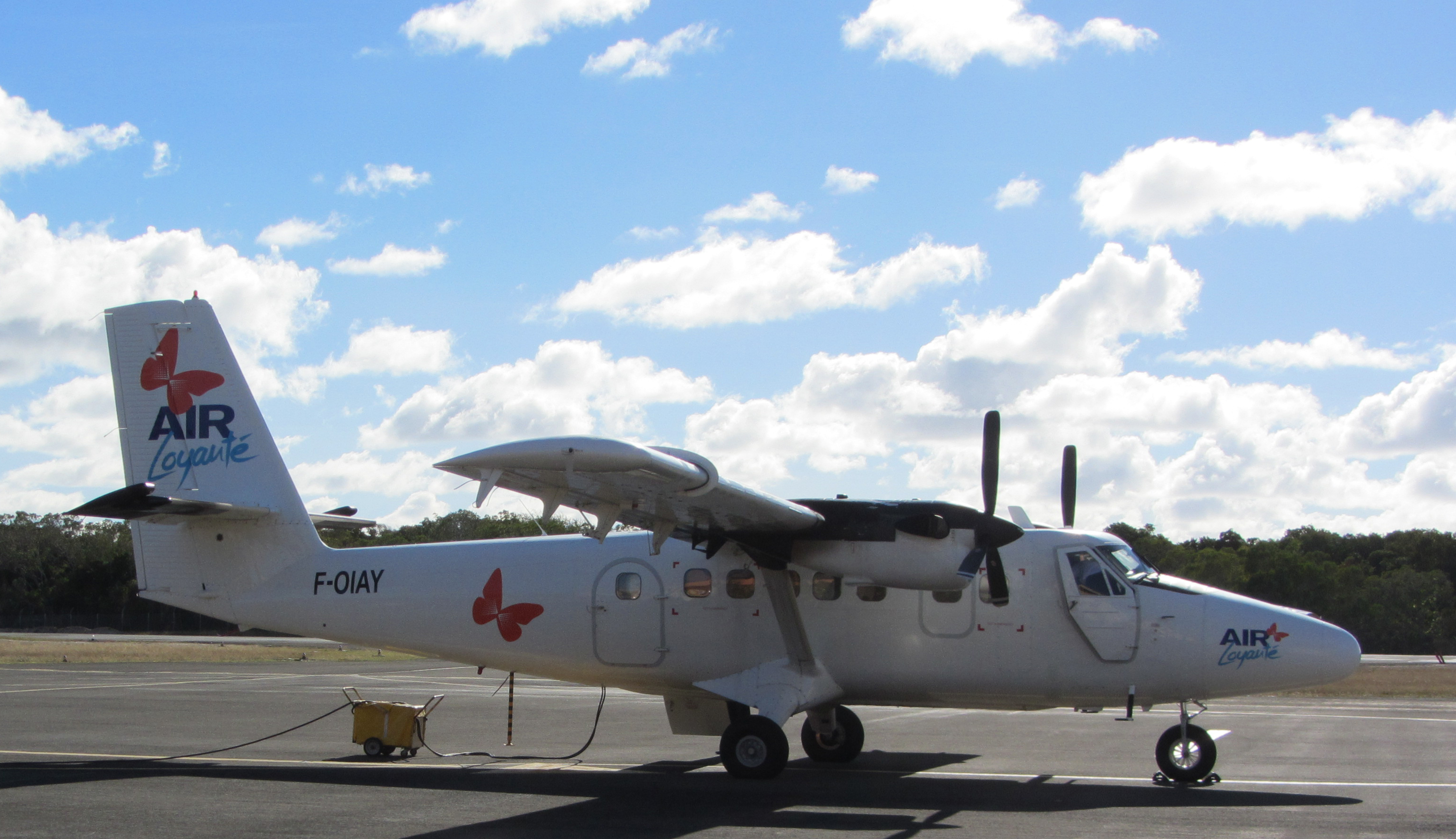
DHC-6 Twin Otter of Air Loyauté at Ouvéa in 2014.

Air Loyauté, established in 2003 by SODIL, operates three DHC-6-300s and planned to introduce two DHC-6-400s in 2011. It serves Lifou, Tiga, Belep Islands, and Touho, with charters to other airports and Port-Vila.

Air Alizé, founded in 2004, provides medical evacuation, tourist, and urgent freight services using a Beechcraft 200 and Piper PA-31.

Helicopter services at Magenta include Hélicocéan, Heli-inter Calédonie, and Hélitourisme for tourism, firefighting, and medical evacuations.

== Rail transport ==
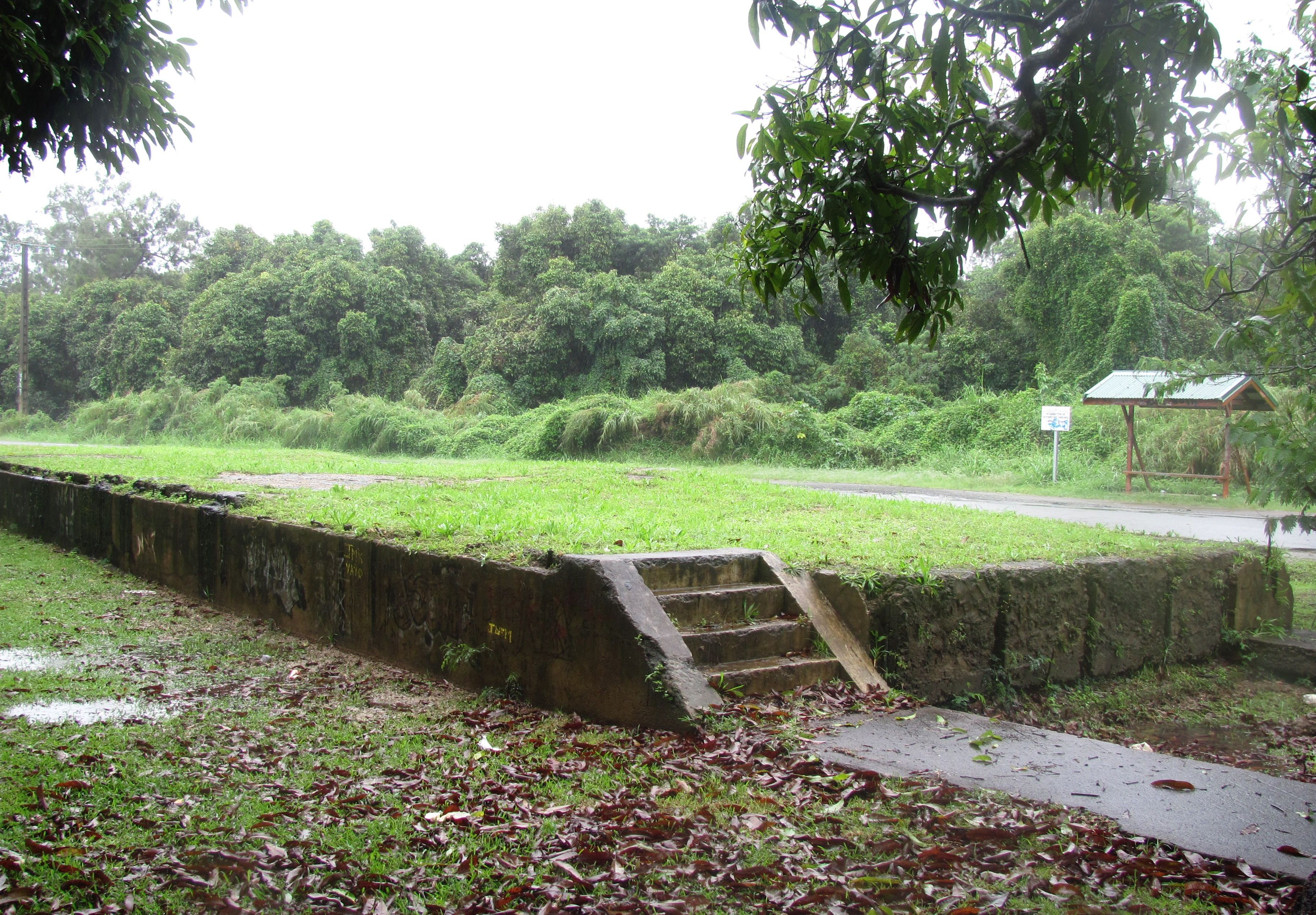
Ruins of the former Païta station in New Caledonia.

The only historical railway in New Caledonia, the "Petit train de la mine," operated between Nouméa and Païta from 1904 to 1939. Planned to reach Bourail, it extended only to Dumbéa by 1906 and Païta by 1914, covering 29 km. Costly infrastructure, including tunnels and bridges, limited its expansion. It closed in 1940 due to financial deficits, epidemics, and road competition. Mining railways (over 400 km) still exist, with efforts by the Trainc association to revive a Nouméa–Païta tourist line.

== See also ==
- New Caledonia
- Transport in France
- Economy of New Caledonia
- Kanak people
- Air Calédonie
- Aircalin
- Loyalty Islands Province
- Tourism in New Caledonia
- New Caledonia Barrier Reef
