= Népoui River =

River of New Caledonia

Coordinates: 21.223°S 165.032°E

The Népoui River is a river of New Caledonia. It has a catchment area of 177 square kilometres.

== See also ==
- List of rivers of New Caledonia
