= Sarraméa =

Commune of New Caledonia

- Commune
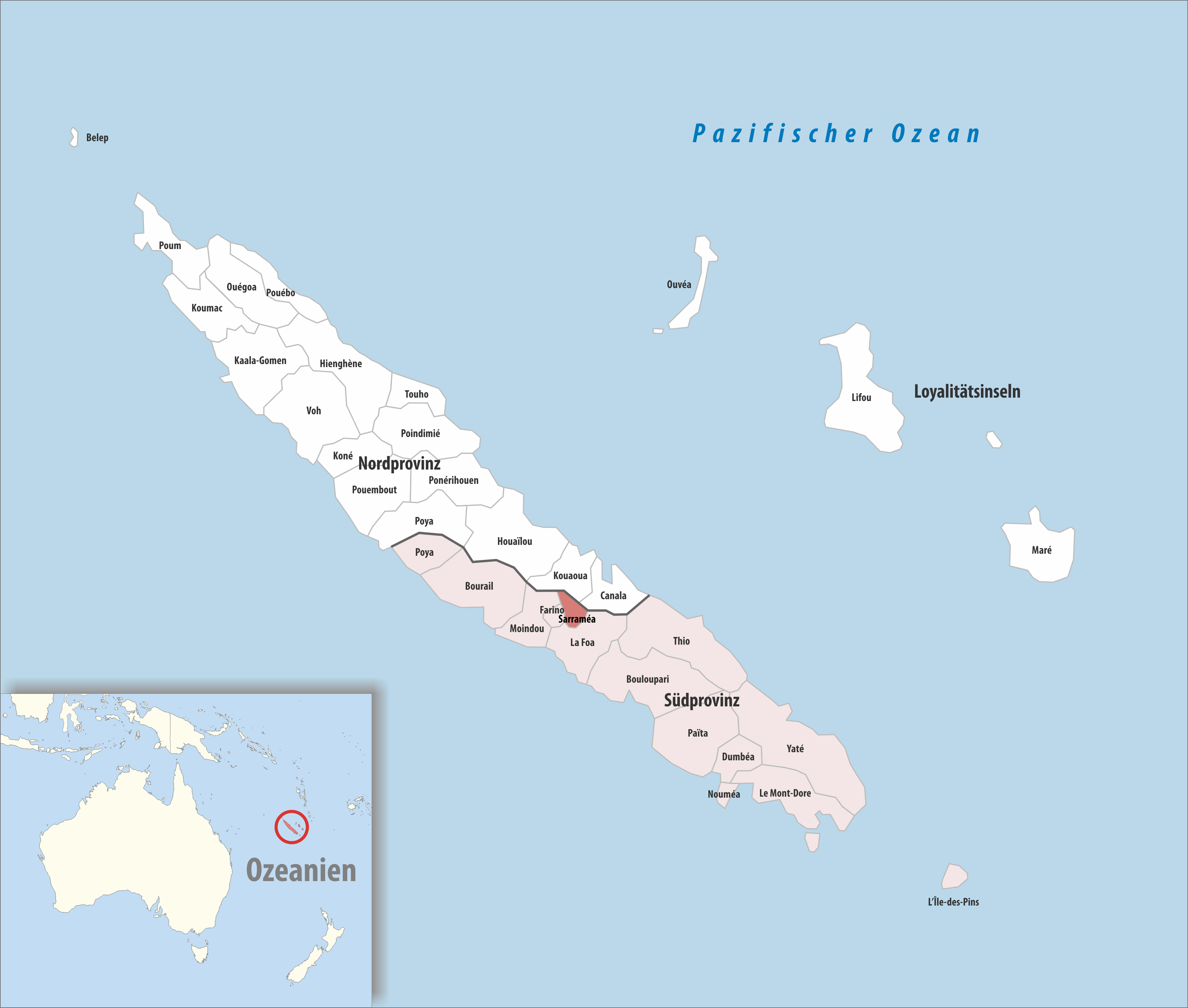
- Location of the commune (in red) within New Caledonia
- Location of Sarraméa
- Coordinates: 21°38′28″S 165°50′46″E
- Country: France
- Sui generis collectivity: New Caledonia
- Province: South Province

Government
  - Mayor (2020–2026): Prisca Holero
- Area^{1}: 106.4 km^{2} (41.1 sq mi)
- Elevation: 60 m (200 ft)
- Highest elevation: 1,010 m (3,310 ft)
- Lowest elevation: 10 m (33 ft)
- Population (2019 census): 572
  - Density: 5.38/km^{2} (13.9/sq mi)

Ethnic distribution
  - 2019 census: Kanaks 76.92% Europeans 8.57% Wallisians and Futunans 0.35% Mixed 5.07% Other 9.09%
- Time zone: UTC+11:00
- INSEE/Postal code: 98828 /98880
- ^{1} New Caledonia Land Register (DITTT) data, which exclude lakes and ponds larger than 1 km² (0.386 sq mi or 247 acres) as well as the estuaries of rivers.

Sarraméa (French: [saʁamea], Tiri: Xûâ Chârâmèa) is a landlocked commune in the South Province of New Caledonia, an overseas territory of France in the Pacific Ocean. It and neighbouring Farino are the only two communes on the island that do not border the sea. With a population of (rounded by the nearest hundred) 500, Sarraméa is the least populous commune of not only South Province, but all of New Caledonia.
