= Vehicle registration plates of New Caledonia =

New Caledonia
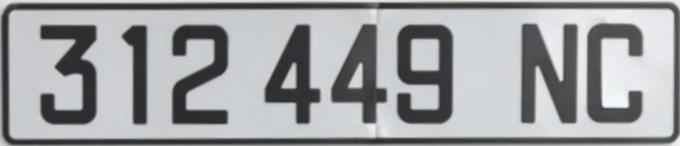
- Current regular legal standard number plate from New Caledonia (988), France.
- Country: New Caledonia (France)
- Country code: F

Current series
- Size: 520 mm × 110 mm 20.5 in × 4.3 in
- Serial format: 123456 NC
- Colour (front): White on black
- Colour (rear): White on black

New Caledonia requires its residents to register their motor vehicles and display vehicle registration plates. Current plates are European standard 520 mm × 110 mm (20.5 in × 4.3 in), and use French stamping dies. The overseas departments and territories of France have three-digit codes, starting with 97, which was originally the single code for them all.

Image	First issued	Design	Slogan	Serial format	Serials issued	Notes
		White on black	None	123456 NC		
