= Nouméa =

Capital and largest city of New Caledonia

- Commune
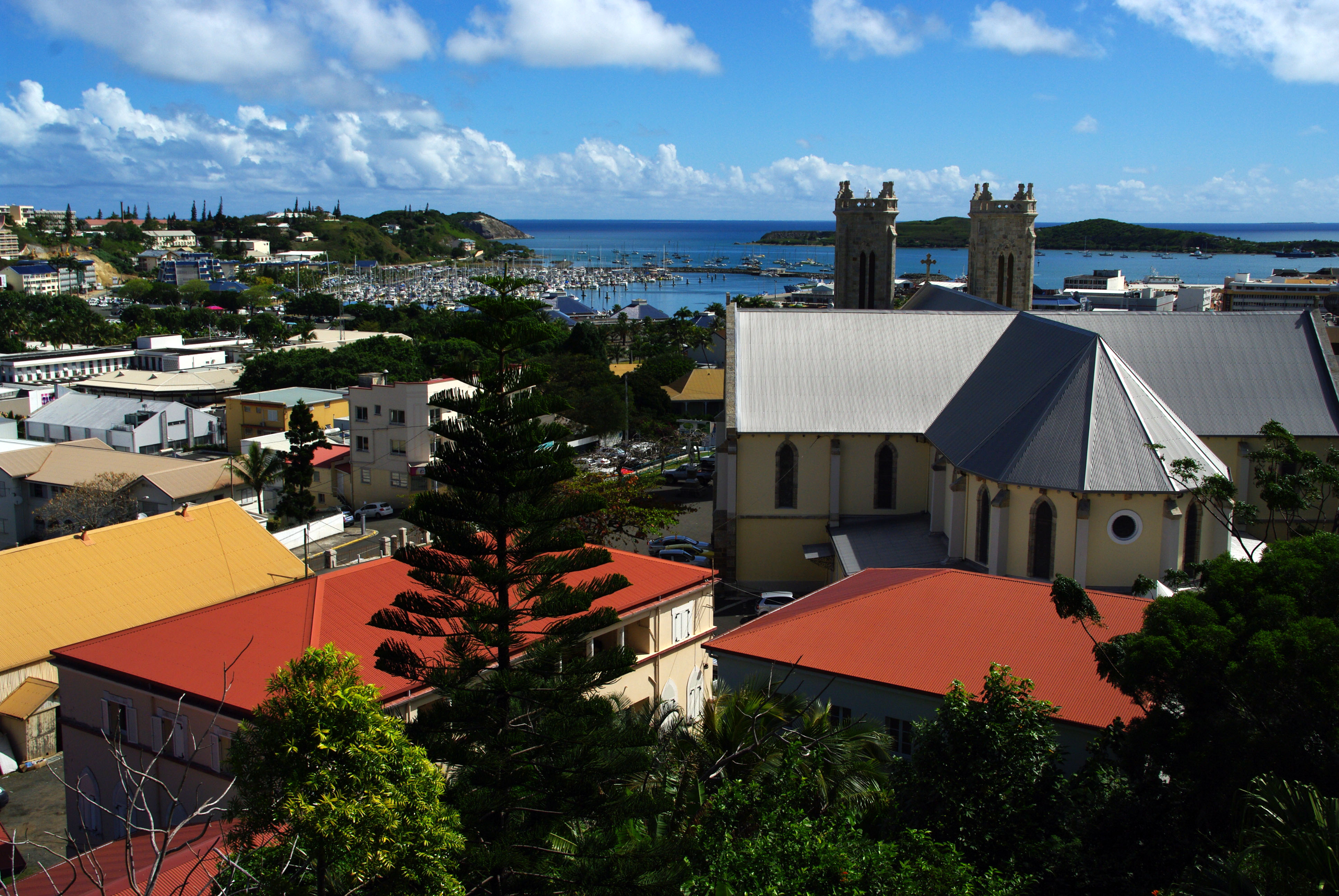
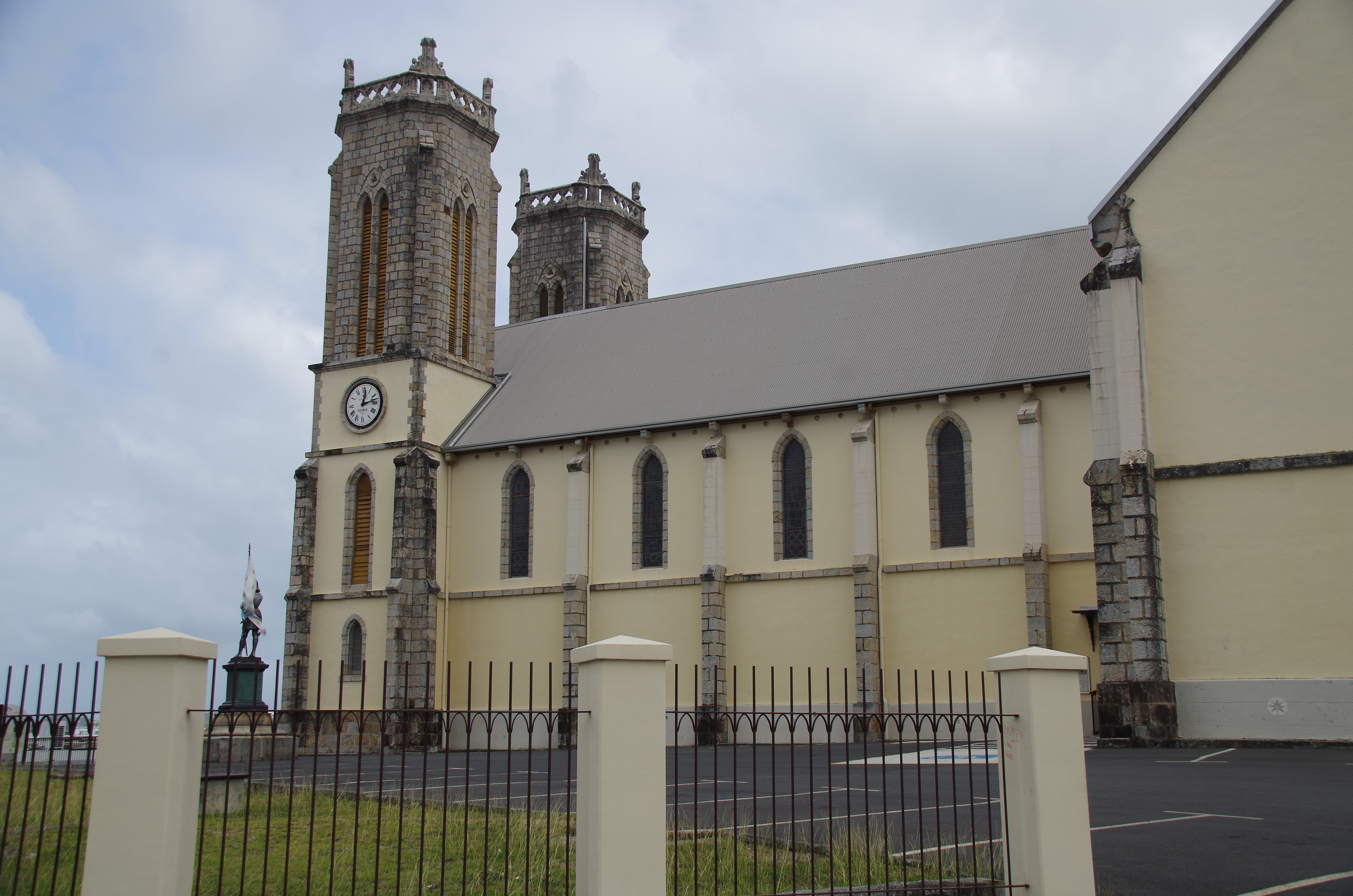
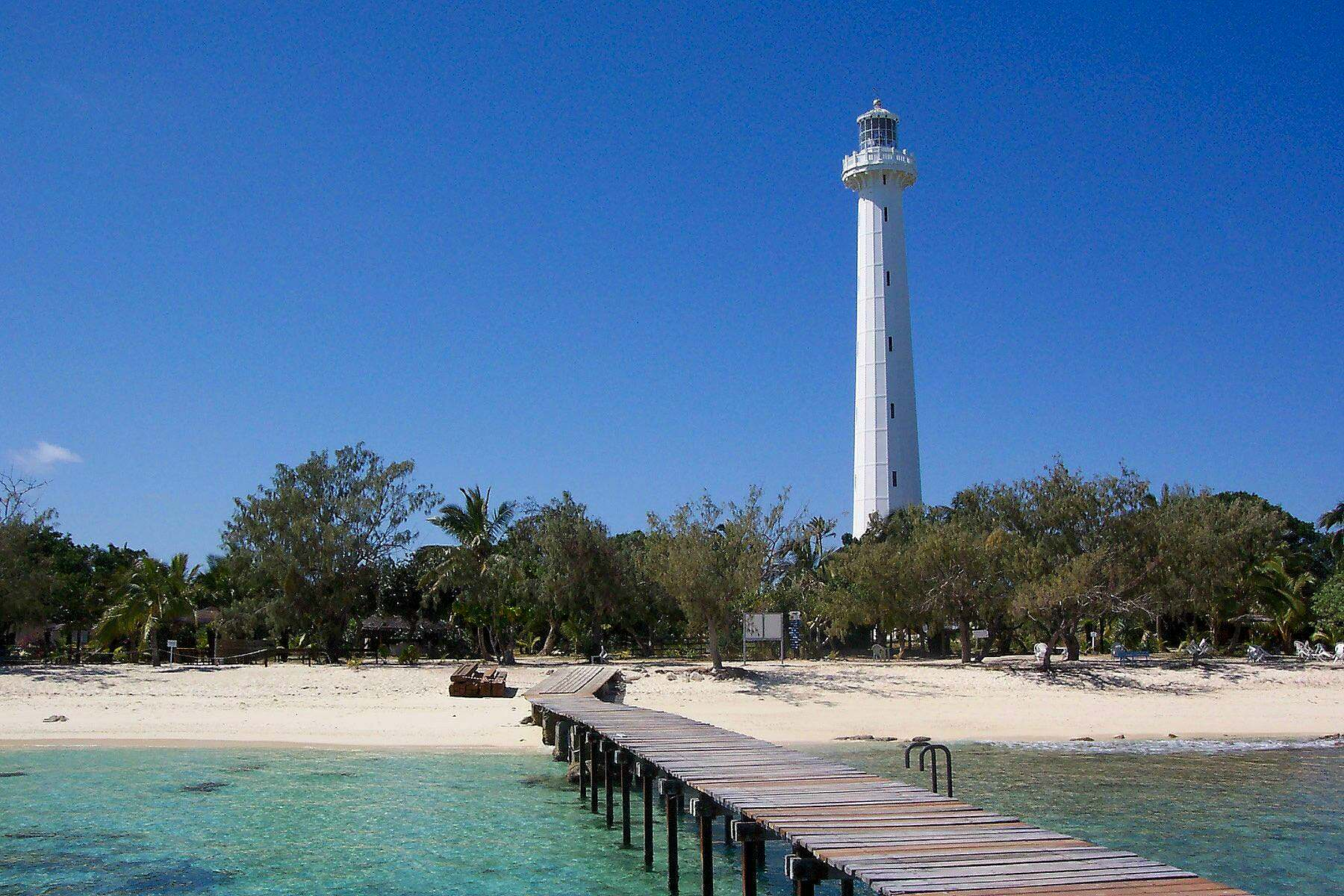
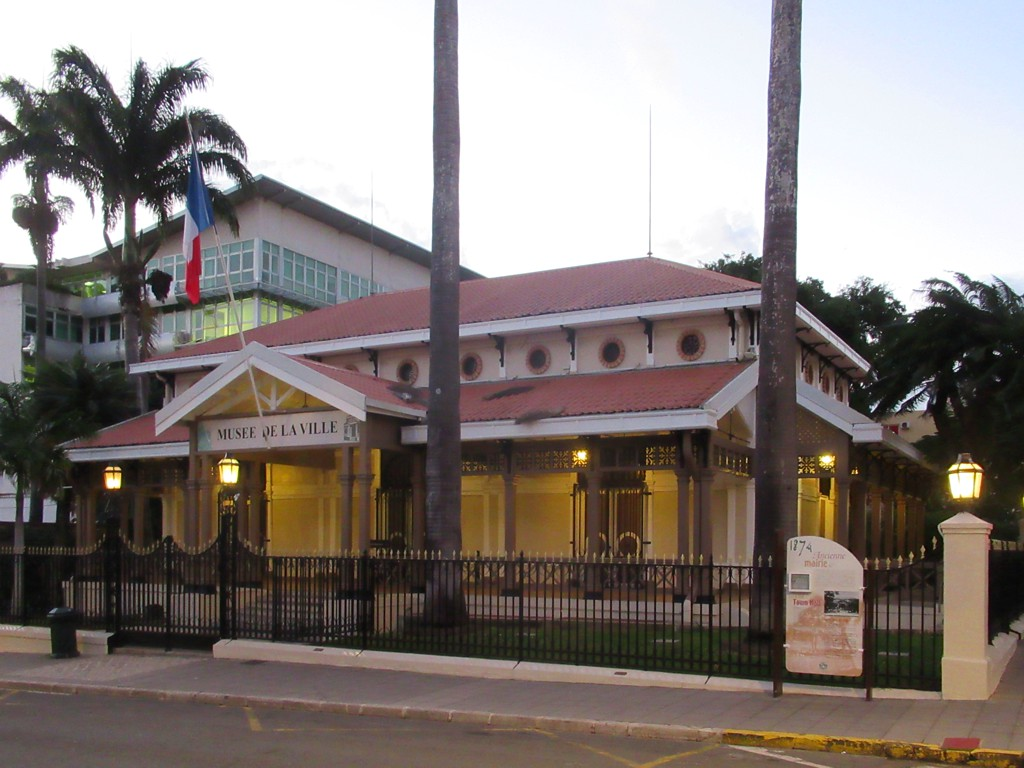
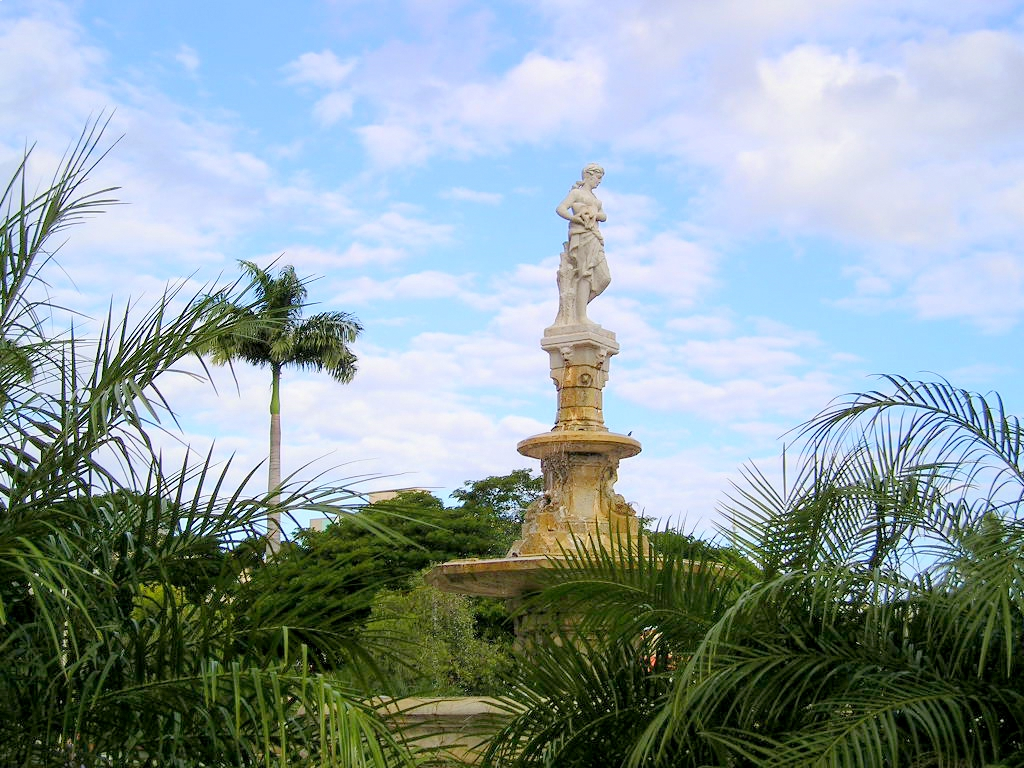
- Top: View of Nouméa; Middle: Nouméa Cathedral, Amédée Lighthouse; Bottom: Nouméa City Museum, Céleste fountain

- Flag Coat of arms

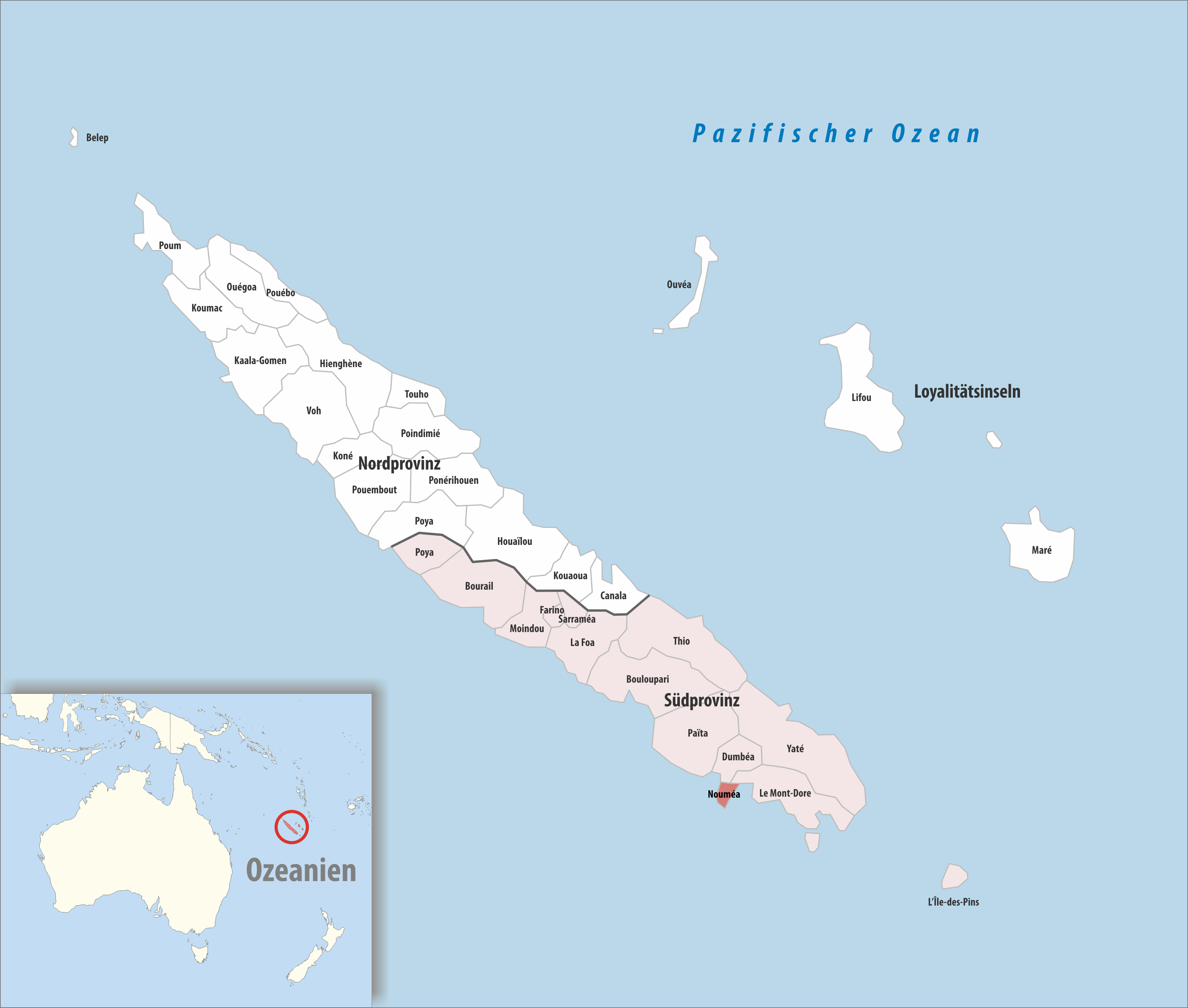
- Location of the commune (in red) within New Caledonia
- Location of Nouméa
- Coordinates: 22°16′33″S 166°27′29″E
- Country: France
- Sui generis collectivity: New Caledonia
- Province: South Province (provincial seat)

Government
  - Mayor (2020–2026): Sonia Lagarde
- Area^{1}: 45.7 km^{2} (17.6 sq mi)
  - Metro: 1,643 km^{2} (634 sq mi)
- Elevation: 20 m (66 ft)
- Highest elevation: 167 m (548 ft)
- Lowest elevation: 0 m (0 ft)
- Population (2025 census): 85,976
  - Density: 1,880/km^{2} (4,870/sq mi)
  - Metro: 173,814
  - Metro density: 105.8/km^{2} (274.0/sq mi)

Ethnic distribution
  - 2019 census: Europeans 39.15% Kanaks 26.62% Wallisians and Futunans 6.1% Mixed 10.22% Other 17.9%
- Time zone: UTC+11:00
- INSEE/Postal code: 98818 /98800
- ^{1} New Caledonia Land Register (DITTT) data, which exclude lakes and ponds larger than 1 km² (0.386 sq mi or 247 acres) as well as the estuaries of rivers.

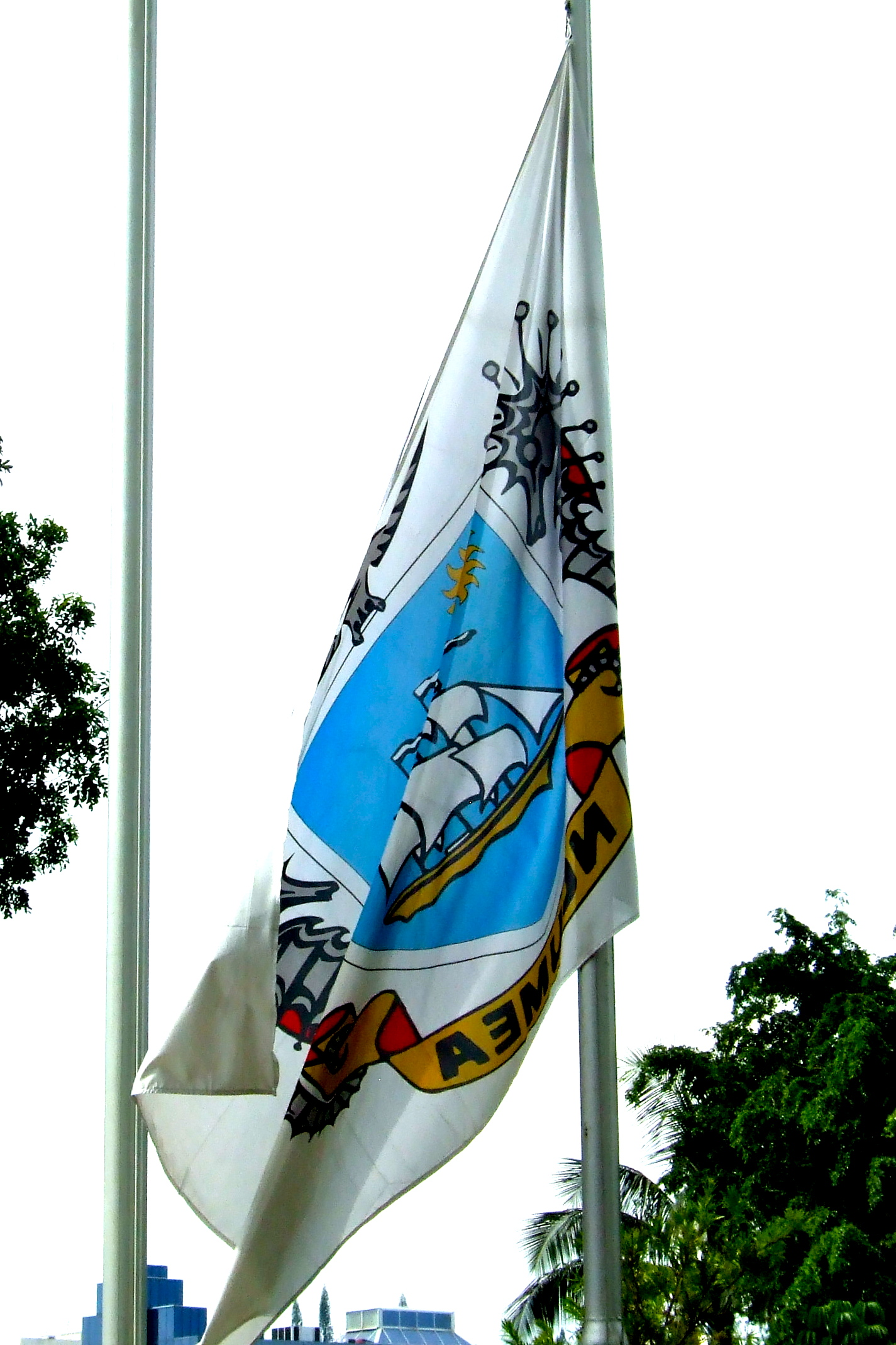
Nouméa city flag, 2011

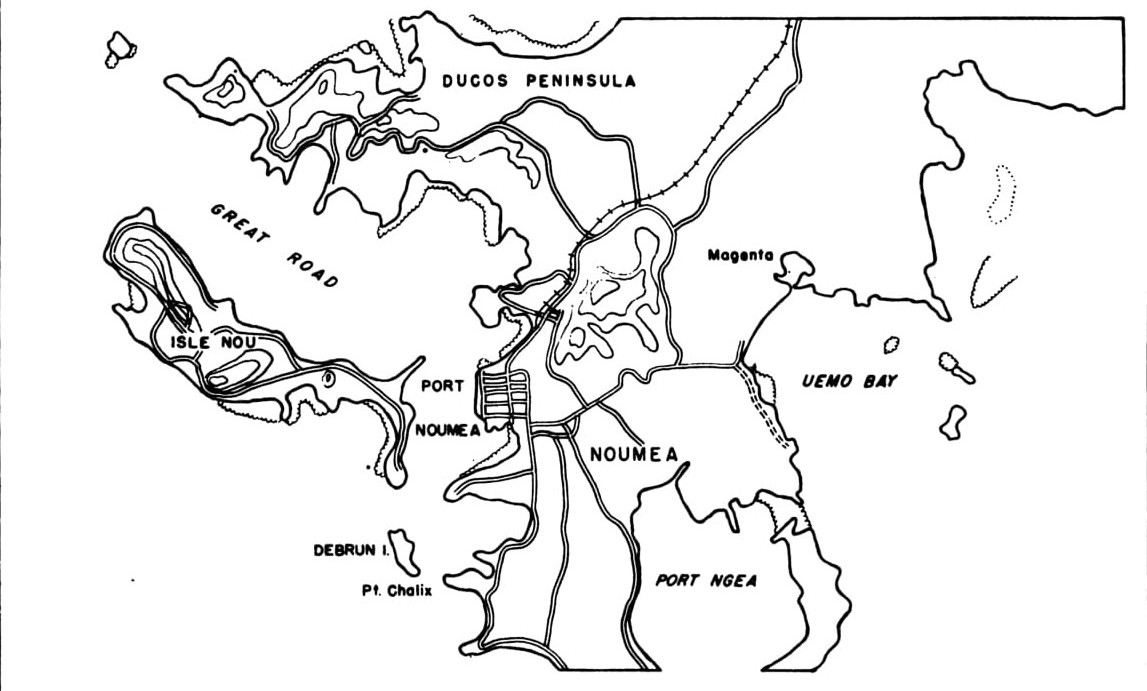
Small scale map of the city

Nouméa (/nuːˈmeɪ.ə/ noo-MAY-uh, nyoo-, -MEE-; French: [numea]) is the capital and largest city of the French special collectivity of New Caledonia. It is the largest Francophone city in Oceania. It is situated on a peninsula in the south of New Caledonia's main island, Grande Terre, and is home to the majority of the island's European, Polynesian (Wallisians, Futunians, Tahitians), Indonesian, and Vietnamese populations, as well as many Melanesians, Ni-Vanuatu and indigenous Kanaks who work in one of the South Pacific's most industrialised cities. The city lies on a protected deepwater harbour that serves as the chief port for New Caledonia.

Nouméa was greatly affected by 2024 riots, which destroyed many businesses throughout the city and its suburbs, and pushed thousands of people to leave the Greater Nouméa area and move either to elsewhere in New Caledonia or to Metropolitan France. As a result, the April 2025 census recorded a marked population decline for Nouméa, with only 173,814 inhabitants living in the metropolitan area of Greater Nouméa (French: agglomération du Grand Nouméa), down from 182,341 at the 2019 census, and 85,976 in the city (commune) of Nouméa proper, down from 94,285 at the 2019 census. This is the first time since the start of statistical records that Greater Nouméa, which covers the communes of Nouméa, Le Mont-Dore, Dumbéa and Païta, has experienced a population decline.

At the 2025 census, 65.7% of the population of New Caledonia lived in Greater Nouméa, down from 67.2% at the 2019 census.

== History ==
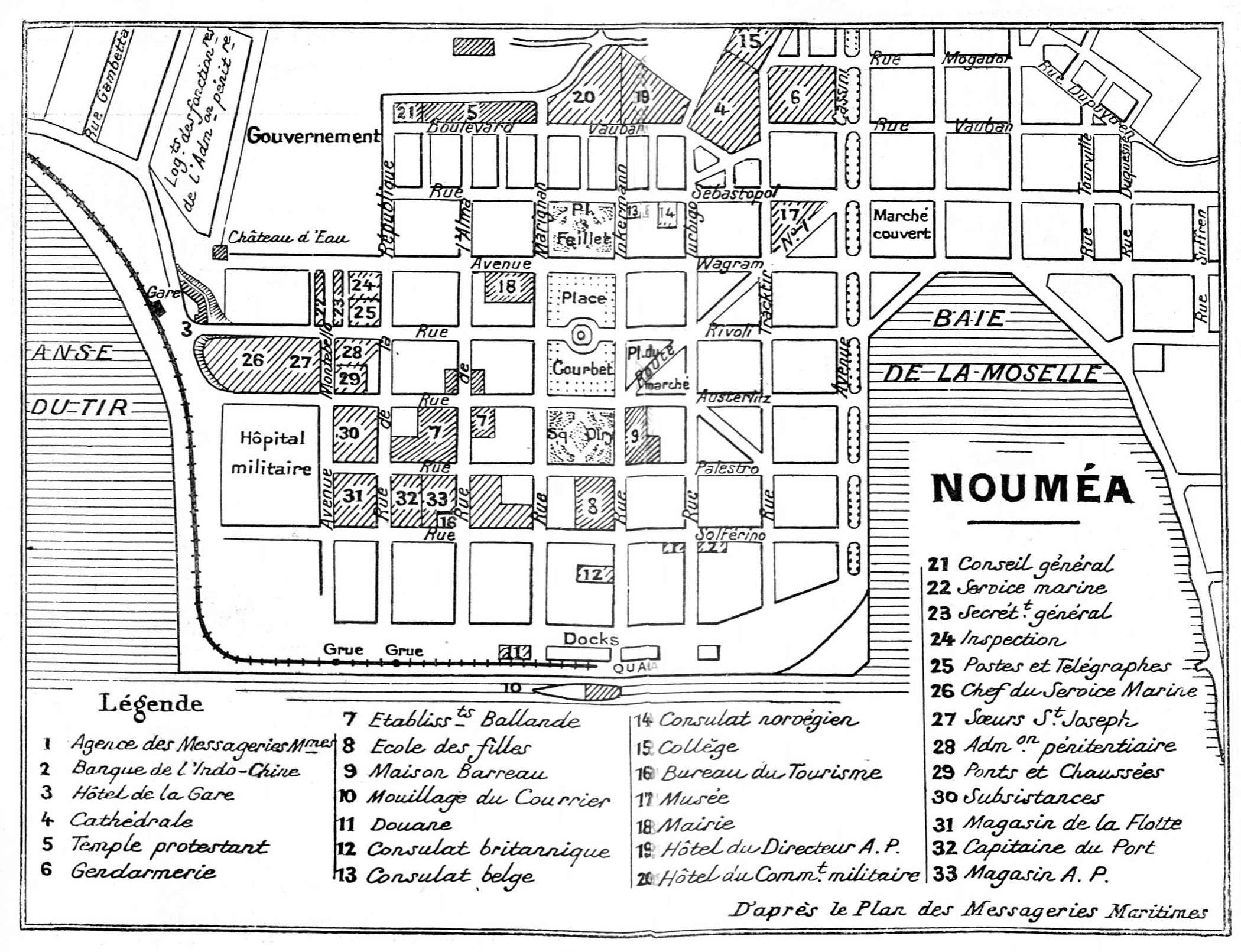
Nouméa 1930

The first European to establish a settlement in the vicinity was British trader James Paddon in 1851. Eager to assert control of the island, the French established a settlement nearby three years later in 1854, moving from Balade in the north of the island. This settlement was initially called Port-de-France and was renamed Nouméa in 1866. The area served first as a penal colony, later as a centre for the exportation of the nickel and gold that was mined nearby.

From 1904 to 1940, Nouméa was linked to Dumbéa and Païta by the Nouméa-Païta railway, the only railway line that ever existed in New Caledonia.

Following the 1940 New Caledonia coup d'état which installed a Free French governor, the United States Navy built Naval Base Noumea and Nouméa served as the headquarters of the United States military in the South Pacific. The five-sided U.S. military headquarters complex was adopted after the war as the base for a new regional intergovernmental development organisation: the South Pacific Commission, later known as the Secretariat of the Pacific Community, and later still as the Pacific Community.

The city maintains much of New Caledonia's unique mix of French and old Melanesian culture. Even today the United States wartime military influence lingers, both with the warmth that many New Caledonian people feel towards the United States after experiencing the relative friendliness of American soldiers and also with the names of several of the quarters in Nouméa. Districts such as "Receiving" and "Robinson", or even "Motor Pool", strike the anglophone ear strangely, until the historical context becomes clear.

In May 2024, protests and riots emerged in Nouméa and New Caledonia at large, due to concerns over an electoral bill that was seen as a threat towards potential independence. The unrest caused damage to the city, along with a major decline in tourism and an exodus of recently arrived residents (Metropolitan Frenchmen who returned to Metropolitan France as well as Kanaks and other ethnic groups who returned to their communes of origin in the rest of New Caledonia).

== Geography ==
The city is situated on an irregular, hilly peninsula near the southeast end of New Caledonia, which is in the south-west Pacific Ocean.

Neighbourhoods of Nouméa include:

- Rivière-Salée
- 6e km, 7e km, Normandie, and Tina
- Ducos peninsula:
  - Ducos, Ducos industriel, Kaméré, Koumourou, Logicoop, Numbo, Tindu
- 4e Km, Aérodrome, Haut Magenta, Magenta, Ouémo, and Portes de fer
- Faubourg Blanchot and Vallée des Colons
- Doniambo, Montagne coupée, Montravel, and Vallée du tir
- Artillerie Nord, Centre Ville, Nouville, Quartier Latin, Vallée du Génie
- Anse Vata (Drubea: Ouata), Artillerie Sud, Baie des Citrons, Motor Pool, N'géa, Orphelinat, Receiving, Trianon, and Val Plaisance

=== Climate ===
Nouméa features a tropical savanna climate (Köppen: Aw) with hot summers and warm winters. Temperatures are warmer in the months of January, February and March with average highs hovering around 30 degrees Celsius and cooler during the months of July and August where average high temperatures are around 23 degrees Celsius. The capital's dry season months are September and October. The rest of the year is noticeably wetter. Nouméa on average receives roughly 1,100 mm (43 in) of precipitation annually.

Climate data for Nouméa (1991–2020 normals, extremes 1950–present)
Month	Jan	Feb	Mar	Apr	May	Jun	Jul	Aug	Sep	Oct	Nov	Dec	Year
Record high °C (°F)	36.8 (98.2)	36.4 (97.5)	36.4 (97.5)	36.1 (97.0)	32.7 (90.9)	30.7 (87.3)	34.0 (93.2)	31.7 (89.1)	33.0 (91.4)	32.3 (90.1)	34.9 (94.8)	35.7 (96.3)	36.8 (98.2)
Mean daily maximum °C (°F)	29.5 (85.1)	29.9 (85.8)	29.0 (84.2)	27.4 (81.3)	25.6 (78.1)	24.2 (75.6)	23.4 (74.1)	23.4 (74.1)	24.7 (76.5)	26.2 (79.2)	27.6 (81.7)	29.1 (84.4)	26.7 (80.1)
Daily mean °C (°F)	26.5 (79.7)	26.9 (80.4)	26.2 (79.2)	24.7 (76.5)	22.9 (73.2)	21.6 (70.9)	20.6 (69.1)	20.5 (68.9)	21.5 (70.7)	22.9 (73.2)	24.3 (75.7)	25.8 (78.4)	23.7 (74.7)
Mean daily minimum °C (°F)	23.4 (74.1)	24.0 (75.2)	23.5 (74.3)	22.0 (71.6)	20.2 (68.4)	18.9 (66.0)	17.7 (63.9)	17.5 (63.5)	18.3 (64.9)	19.6 (67.3)	21.0 (69.8)	22.5 (72.5)	20.7 (69.3)
Record low °C (°F)	18.6 (65.5)	19.0 (66.2)	18.8 (65.8)	16.7 (62.1)	15.7 (60.3)	13.6 (56.5)	13.5 (56.3)	13.2 (55.8)	13.3 (55.9)	14.2 (57.6)	15.2 (59.4)	17.8 (64.0)	13.2 (55.8)
Average precipitation mm (inches)	107.2 (4.22)	128.3 (5.05)	161.9 (6.37)	118.3 (4.66)	89.9 (3.54)	77.5 (3.05)	69.8 (2.75)	67.5 (2.66)	39.3 (1.55)	36.3 (1.43)	44.2 (1.74)	64.0 (2.52)	1,004.2 (39.54)
Average precipitation days (≥ 1.0 mm)	10.1	10.8	11.9	11.7	11.3	9.3	9.4	8.4	5.8	4.8	6.0	6.7	106.3
Mean monthly sunshine hours	238.5	205.6	196.1	193.1	173.2	154.6	182.4	203.5	230.8	258.6	250.6	261.8	2,548.7
Source 1: Météo-France, Meteociel (sunshine 1981–2010)
Source 2: Service de la météorologie de la Nouvelle-Calédonie

Climate data for Nouméa (Magenta, 1991–2020 averages, extremes 1964–present)
Month	Jan	Feb	Mar	Apr	May	Jun	Jul	Aug	Sep	Oct	Nov	Dec	Year
Record high °C (°F)	36.8 (98.2)	35.4 (95.7)	35.7 (96.3)	34.1 (93.4)	32.4 (90.3)	30.8 (87.4)	32.0 (89.6)	31.7 (89.1)	32.6 (90.7)	31.9 (89.4)	35.7 (96.3)	35.5 (95.9)	36.8 (98.2)
Mean daily maximum °C (°F)	29.1 (84.4)	29.6 (85.3)	28.8 (83.8)	27.4 (81.3)	25.7 (78.3)	24.3 (75.7)	23.4 (74.1)	23.3 (73.9)	24.5 (76.1)	25.8 (78.4)	27.1 (80.8)	28.5 (83.3)	26.5 (79.7)
Daily mean °C (°F)	26.4 (79.5)	26.9 (80.4)	26.2 (79.2)	24.7 (76.5)	22.7 (72.9)	21.3 (70.3)	20.2 (68.4)	20.1 (68.2)	21.1 (70.0)	22.6 (72.7)	24.0 (75.2)	25.6 (78.1)	23.5 (74.3)
Mean daily minimum °C (°F)	23.7 (74.7)	24.2 (75.6)	23.7 (74.7)	22.1 (71.8)	19.8 (67.6)	18.4 (65.1)	17.0 (62.6)	16.8 (62.2)	17.8 (64.0)	19.5 (67.1)	21.0 (69.8)	22.7 (72.9)	20.6 (69.1)
Record low °C (°F)	17.5 (63.5)	17.9 (64.2)	14.5 (58.1)	14.6 (58.3)	12.0 (53.6)	10.8 (51.4)	8.9 (48.0)	9.9 (49.8)	9.9 (49.8)	10.8 (51.4)	13.2 (55.8)	16.0 (60.8)	8.9 (48.0)
Average precipitation mm (inches)	107.9 (4.25)	134.0 (5.28)	167.7 (6.60)	124.2 (4.89)	86.0 (3.39)	82.1 (3.23)	71.8 (2.83)	70.3 (2.77)	38.4 (1.51)	39.1 (1.54)	44.4 (1.75)	68.4 (2.69)	1,034.3 (40.72)
Average precipitation days (≥ 1.0 mm)	9.7	10.8	12.2	12.0	11.0	9.5	9.2	8.5	5.5	5.1	6.1	6.9	106.4
Source: Météo France

Climate data for Nouméa (Amédée, 1991–2020 averages, extremes 1989–present)
Month	Jan	Feb	Mar	Apr	May	Jun	Jul	Aug	Sep	Oct	Nov	Dec	Year
Record high °C (°F)	36.7 (98.1)	36.4 (97.5)	35.4 (95.7)	32.7 (90.9)	31.2 (88.2)	30.2 (86.4)	31.0 (87.8)	29.2 (84.6)	30.4 (86.7)	30.7 (87.3)	33.1 (91.6)	34.3 (93.7)	36.7 (98.1)
Mean daily maximum °C (°F)	29.2 (84.6)	29.8 (85.6)	29.0 (84.2)	27.6 (81.7)	26.0 (78.8)	24.6 (76.3)	23.8 (74.8)	23.9 (75.0)	25.0 (77.0)	26.1 (79.0)	27.4 (81.3)	28.7 (83.7)	26.8 (80.2)
Daily mean °C (°F)	26.7 (80.1)	27.3 (81.1)	26.7 (80.1)	25.4 (77.7)	23.9 (75.0)	22.5 (72.5)	21.6 (70.9)	21.4 (70.5)	22.3 (72.1)	23.5 (74.3)	24.7 (76.5)	26.0 (78.8)	24.3 (75.7)
Mean daily minimum °C (°F)	24.2 (75.6)	24.8 (76.6)	24.4 (75.9)	23.2 (73.8)	21.7 (71.1)	20.4 (68.7)	19.3 (66.7)	19.0 (66.2)	19.7 (67.5)	20.8 (69.4)	22.0 (71.6)	23.4 (74.1)	21.9 (71.4)
Record low °C (°F)	20.3 (68.5)	20.2 (68.4)	20.3 (68.5)	18.4 (65.1)	16.8 (62.2)	16.0 (60.8)	15.2 (59.4)	14.3 (57.7)	14.8 (58.6)	16.5 (61.7)	16.9 (62.4)	19.4 (66.9)	14.3 (57.7)
Average precipitation mm (inches)	92.8 (3.65)	81.4 (3.20)	107.2 (4.22)	83.0 (3.27)	74.6 (2.94)	65.8 (2.59)	61.1 (2.41)	56.3 (2.22)	36.2 (1.43)	27.0 (1.06)	30.5 (1.20)	49.3 (1.94)	765.2 (30.13)
Average precipitation days (≥ 1.0 mm)	7.7	9.2	9.9	9.3	9.8	8.8	8.0	7.0	4.5	4.7	4.6	5.4	88.8
Source: Météo-France

== Demographics ==
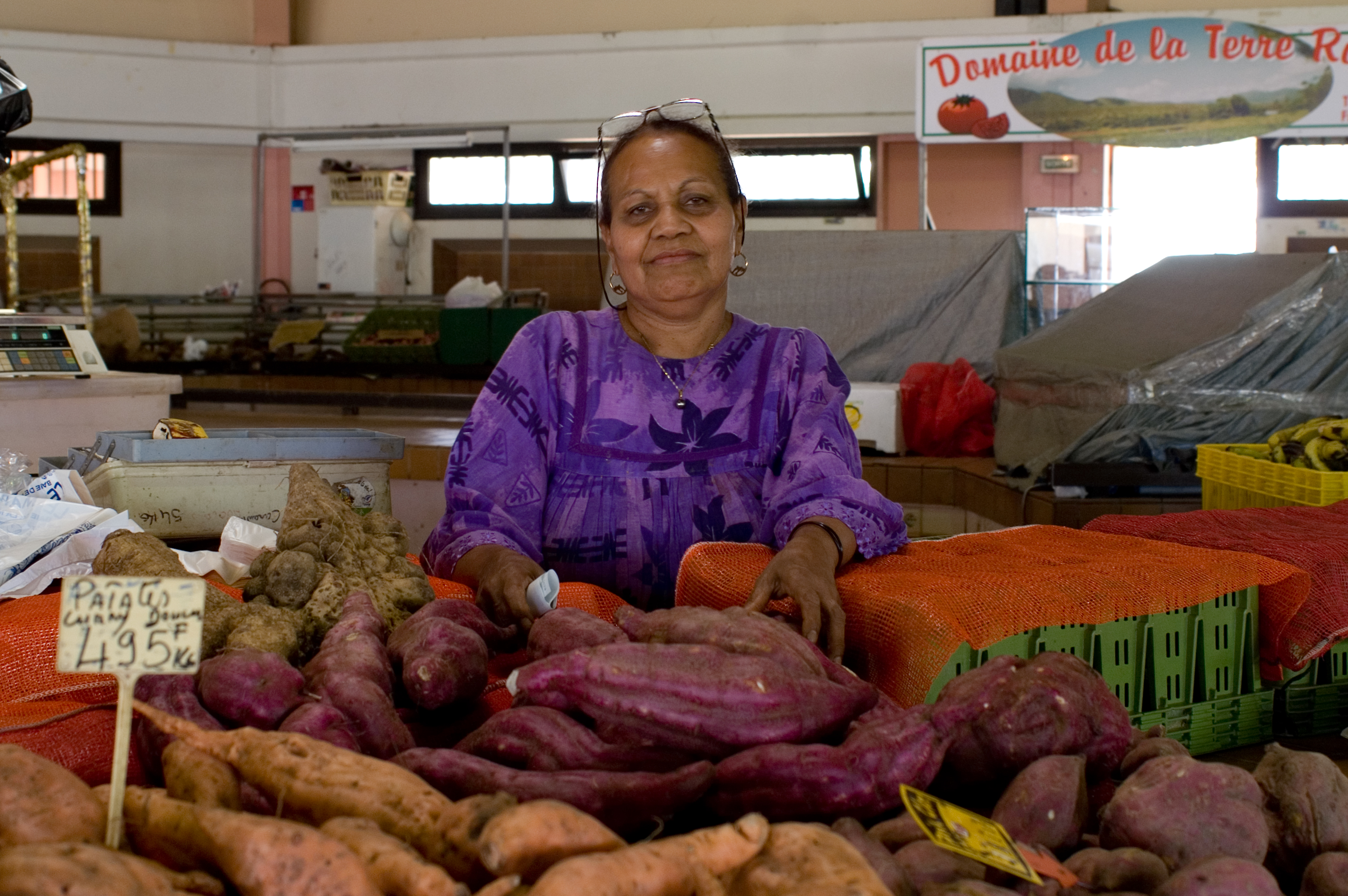
A woman at a market in Nouméa, 2006

The Greater Nouméa metropolitan area (French: agglomération du Grand Nouméa) had a total population of 173,814 inhabitants at the April 2025 census, 85,976 of whom lived in the commune of Nouméa proper.

The Greater Nouméa metropolitan area is made up of four communes:

- Nouméa (85,976 inh.)
- Dumbéa (34,926 inh.), to the north-west of Nouméa
- Le Mont-Dore (25,303 inh.), to the north-east of Nouméa
- Païta (27,609 inh.), a suburb to the west of Dumbéa and the site of La Tontouta International Airport

=== Historical population ===
Historical population Nouméa (commune)
Year	Pop.	±% p.a.
1956	22,235	—
1963	34,990	+7.34%
1969	41,853	+3.10%
1976	56,078	+4.20%
1983	60,112	+1.00%
1989	65,110	+1.35%
1996	76,293	+2.28%
2009	97,579	+1.87%
2014	99,926	+0.47%
2019	94,285	−1.15%
2025	85,976	−1.63%
Source: ISEE

Historical population Greater Nouméa (metropolitan area)
Year	Pop.	±% p.a.
1956	25,204	—
1963	39,996	+7.48%
1969	50,488	+4.06%
1976	74,335	+5.58%
1983	85,098	+1.96%
1989	97,581	+2.32%
1996	118,823	+2.84%
2009	163,723	+2.44%
2014	179,509	+1.83%
2019	182,341	+0.31%
2025	173,814	−0.85%
Source: SPLAF and ISEE

Average population growth of the Greater Nouméa metropolitan area:

- 1956–1963: +2,310 people per year (+7.5% per year)
- 1963–1969: +1,791 people per year (+4.1% per year)
- 1969–1976: +3,349 people per year (+5.6% per year)
- 1976–1983: +1,543 people per year (+2.0% per year)
- 1983–1989: +2,091 people per year (+2.3% per year)
- 1989–1996: +3,020 people per year (+2.8% per year)
- 1996–2009: +3,382 people per year (+2.4% per year)
- 2009–2014: +3,106 people per year (+1.8% per year)
- 2014–2019: +562 people per year (+0.3% per year)
- 2019–2025: -1,519 people per year (-0.85% per year)

=== Migrations ===
The places of birth of the 182,341 residents in the Greater Nouméa metropolitan area at the 2019 census were the following:

- 70.9% were born in New Caledonia (up from 66.7% at the 2014 census)
- 18.4% in Metropolitan France or its overseas departments and territories (outside of the Pacific) (down from 21.2% at the 2014 census)
- 5.6% in foreign countries (notably Indonesia, Vanuatu, Vietnam, and Algeria) (down from 6.3% at the 2014 census)
- 5.1% in France's other Pacific territories, primarily Wallis and Futuna and to a lesser degree French Polynesia (down from 5.8% at the 2014 census)

=== Ethnic communities ===
The self-reported ethnic communities of the 182,341 residents in the Greater Nouméa metropolitan area at the 2019 census were as follows:

- 30.65% Europeans
- 26.36% Kanaks (original Melanesian inhabitants of New Caledonia)
- 11.66% Wallisians and Futunians
- 12.59% mixed ethnicity
- 18.75% other communities (this group includes in particular the White people of New Caledonia who refused to self-identify as "Europeans")

=== Languages ===
At the 2009 census, 98.7% of the population in the Greater Nouméa metropolitan area whose age was 15 years and older reported that they could speak French. 97.1% reported that they could also read and write it. Only 1.3% of the population whose age was 15 years and older had no knowledge of French.

At the 2019 census, 23.4% of the population of the metropolitan area 15 years and older reported that they could speak at least one of the Kanak languages (up from 20.8% at the 2009 census). 6.1% reported that they could understand a Kanak language but not speak it (up from 4.3% at the 2009 census). 70.5% of the population whose age was 15 years and older had no knowledge of any Kanak language (down from 74.9% at the 2009 census).

Due to the tourism industry (with the bulk of tourists coming from Australia and New Zealand), English is widely spoken as a second or third language in Nouméa. Japanese is also known (albeit to a much lesser extent) due to tourism from Japan.

== Economy ==
Although it is not currently a major tourist destination, Nouméa has experienced a construction boom in the 21st century. The installation of amenities has kept pace and the municipality boasts a public works programme. The mayor of Noumea is Sonia Lagarde; in 2020 her re-election was opposed by the former leader of the Confederation of Small and Medium Enterprises (CPME), Cherifa Linossier, whose unsuccessful campaign was based on local economic revitalisation.

== Transport ==
Aircalin, the international airline of New Caledonia, and Air Calédonie (Aircal), the domestic airline, have their headquarters in the city. Aircal's headquarters are on the grounds of Nouméa Magenta Airport, which serves local routes. Nouméa's international airport is La Tontouta International Airport, 50 kilometres (31 mi) from the city.

The Nouméa-Païta railway, which was the only railway line that ever existed in New Caledonia, was closed in 1940.

== Education ==
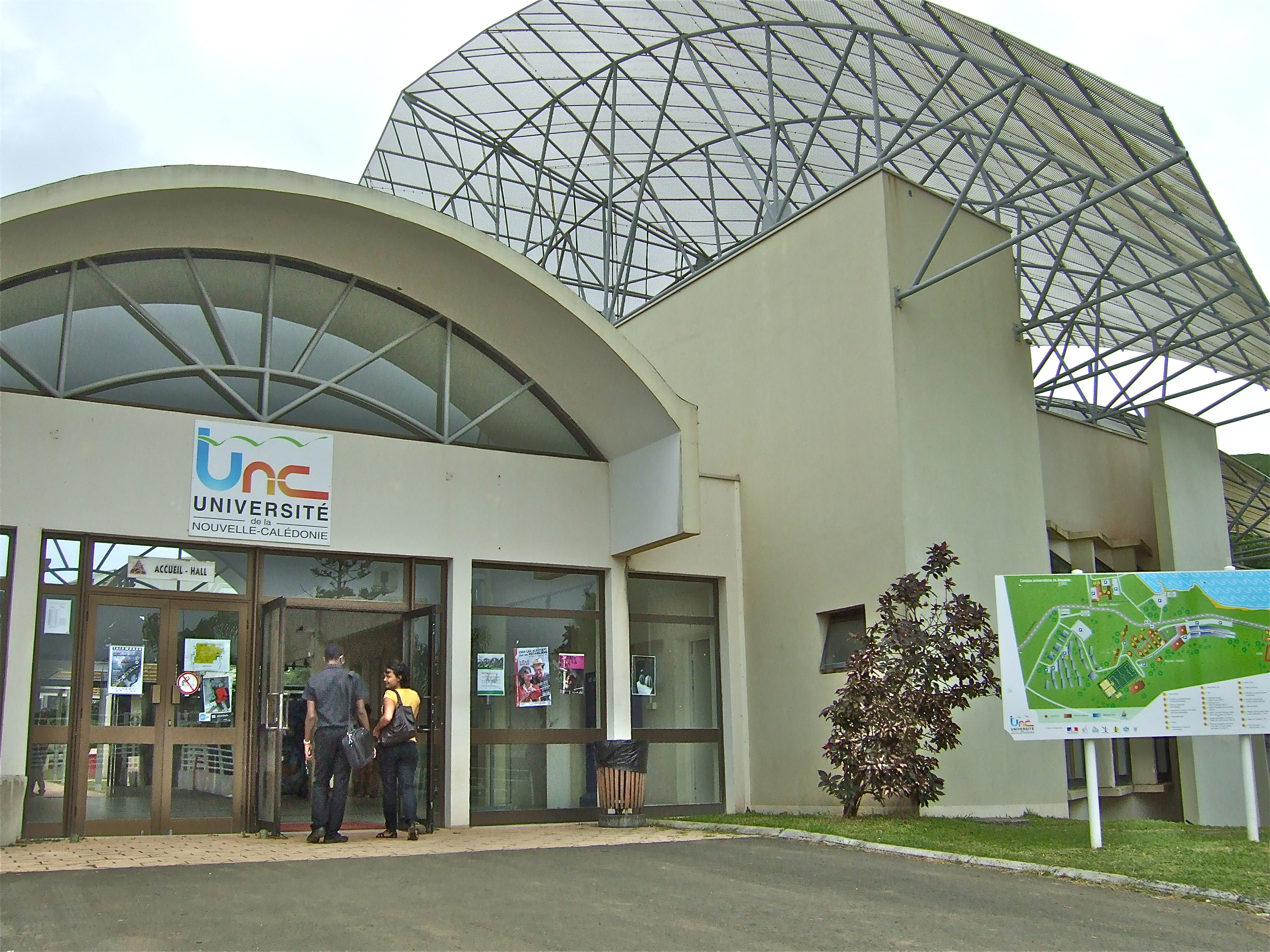
University of New Caledonia, Nouville campus, 2011

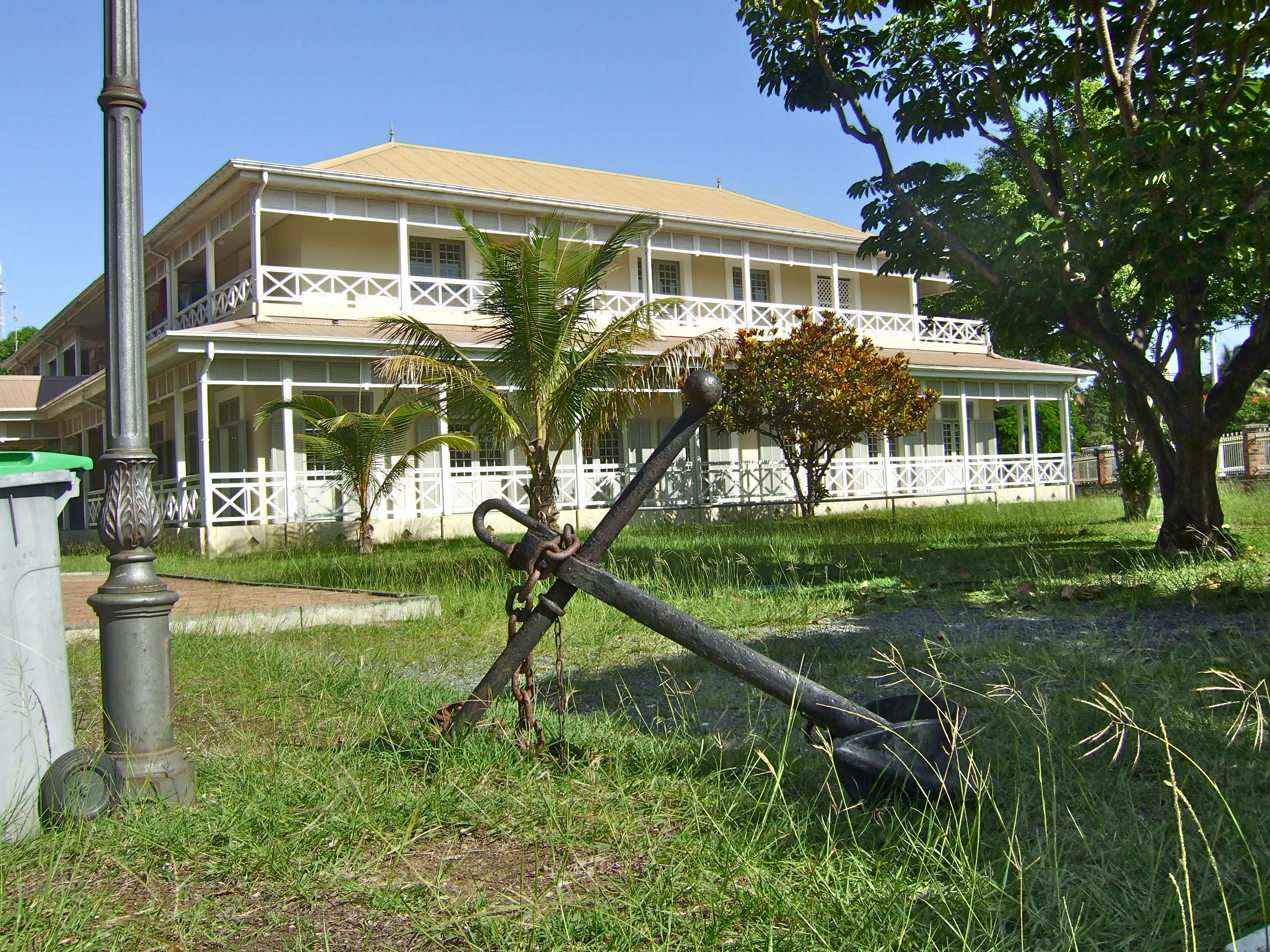
Bernheim Library exterior, 2011

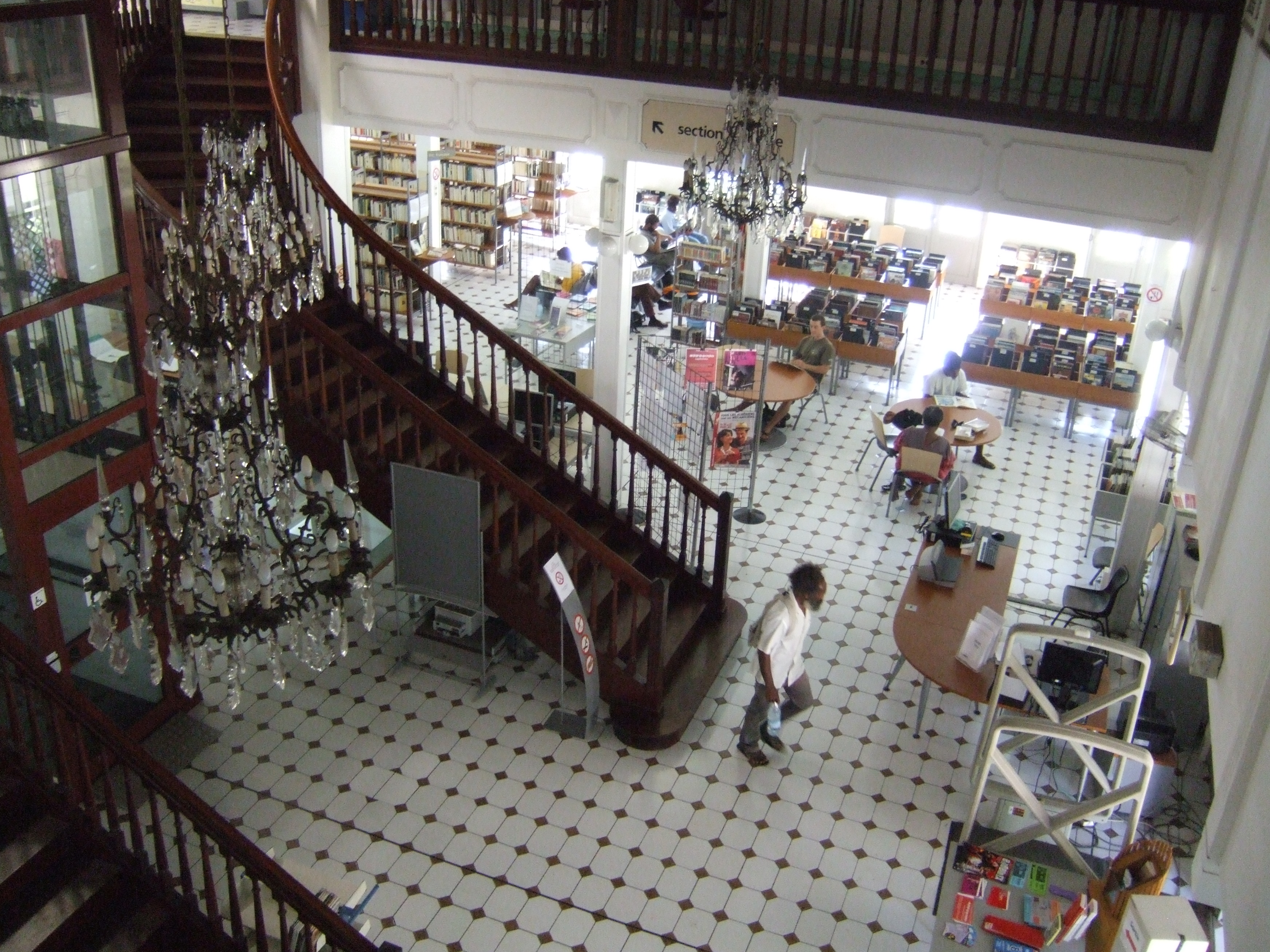
Bernheim Library interior, 2011

The University of New Caledonia (UNC) dates to 1987 when the Université française du Pacifique (French University of the Pacific) was created, with two centres, one in French Polynesia and the other in New Caledonia. In 1997 the decision was made to split the two parts into separate universities and so in 1999 the Université de la Nouvelle-Calédonie and the Université de la Polynésie française were formed.

UNC welcomes around 3,000 local and international students and 100 professors and researchers each year.

The Bibliothèque Bernheim (Bernheim Library) is located in Nouméa.

The city is home to several museums, including the Maritime Museum of New Caledonia.

== Twin towns – sister cities ==
Nouméa is twinned with:

- Gold Coast, Australia
- Nice, France
- Papeete, French Polynesia
- Taupō, New Zealand

== Notable people ==
- Marianne Devaux – politician
- Ilaïsaane Lauouvéa – politician
- Gilles Pisier – mathematician
- Peato Mauvaka – rugby union player
- Maxime Grousset – Olympic swimmer
