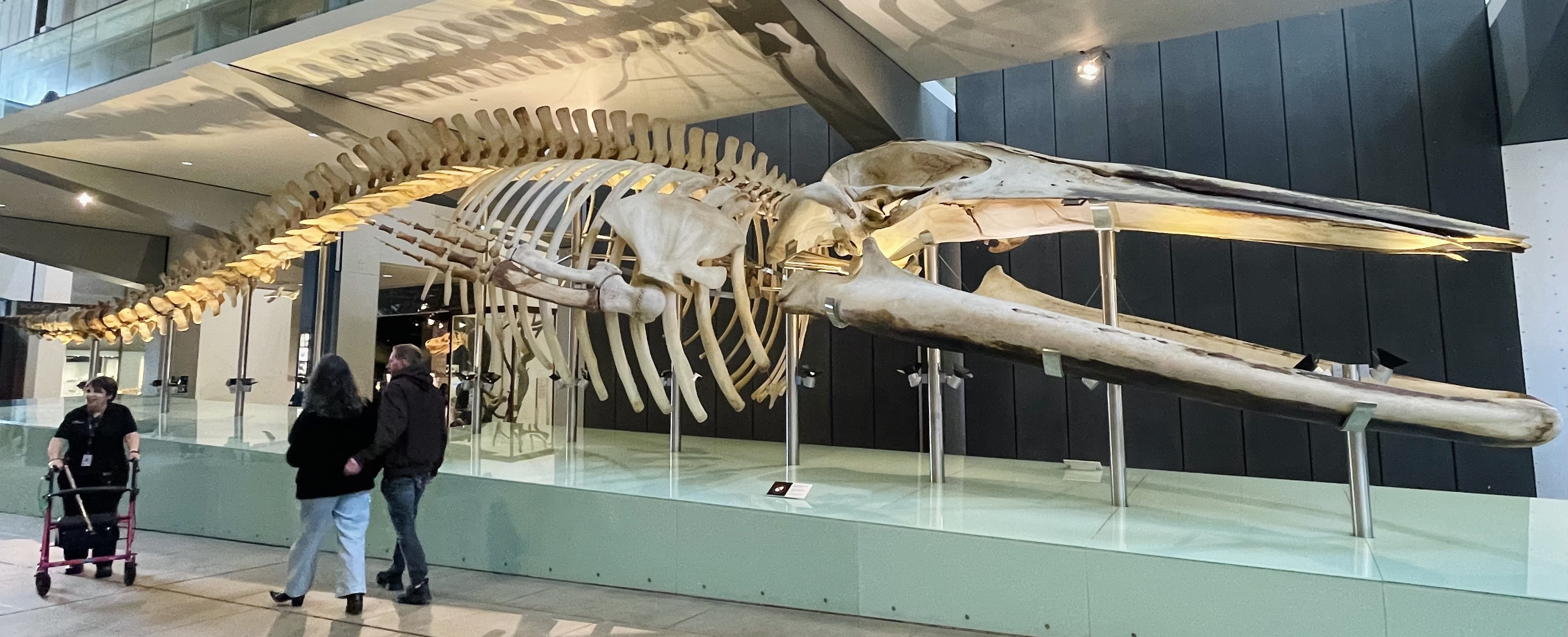
- Skeleton at Melbourne Museum

Conservation status
- Data Deficient (IUCN 3.1)

Scientific classification
- Kingdom: Animalia
- Phylum: Chordata
- Class: Mammalia
- Order: Artiodactyla
- Infraorder: Cetacea
- Family: Balaenopteridae
- Genus: Balaenoptera
- Species: B. musculus
- Subspecies: B. m. brevicauda

Trinomial name
- Balaenoptera musculus brevicauda Ichihara, 1966

= Pygmy blue whale =

Pygmy blue whale Temporal range: Late Pleistocene – Recent 0.02–0 Ma

Subspecies of blue whale

The pygmy blue whale (Balaenoptera musculus brevicauda) is a subspecies of the blue whale (Balaenoptera musculus) found in the Indian Ocean and the Southern Pacific Ocean.

== Taxonomy ==
The pygmy blue whale formed from a founder group of Antarctic blue whales about 20,000 years ago, around the Last Glacial Maximum. This is likely because blue whales were driven north by expanding ice, and some have stayed there ever since. The pygmy blue whale's recent evolutionary origins cause it to have a relatively low genetic diversity.

Reaching lengths of up to 24 m (79 ft), it is smaller than the other commonly recognized subspecies, B. m. musculus and B. m. intermedia, the former reaching 28 m (92 ft) and the latter 30 m (98 ft) or slightly more, hence its common name.

A fourth subspecies, B. m. indica, was identified by Edward Blyth in 1859 in the northern Indian Ocean, but difficulties in identifying distinguishing features for this subspecies lead to it being used a synonym for B. m. musculus. It is now thought to be the same subspecies as the pygmy blue whale. Records for Soviet catches seem to indicate the female adult size is closer to that of the pygmy blue than B. m. musculus, although the populations of B. m. indica and B. m. brevicauda appear to be discrete, and the breeding seasons differ by almost six months.

Pygmy blue whales are believed to be more numerous than the other subspecies, possibly making up half of all blue whales alive today. The current global population of pygmy blue whales is estimated at 10,000.

Although the designation is widely accepted, because of the relatively healthy stocks of pygmy blues compared to the other subspecies, the Committee on the Status of Endangered Wildlife in Canada has questioned whether the subclassification of the pygmy blue whale has been driven by the interests of the whaling industry.

== Description ==
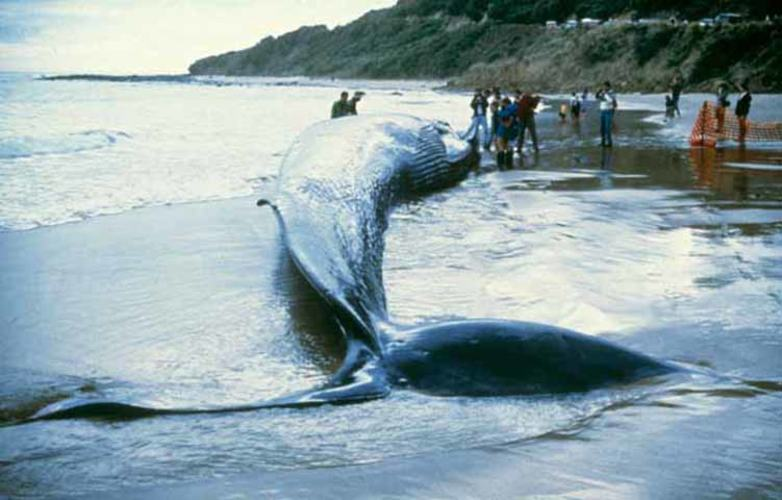
A pygmy blue whale specimen stranded in 1992 on a beach at Cathedral Rock, 5 km NE of Lorne, near Melbourne.

According to observations made since the subspecies was first described in 1966, the pygmy blue whale differs from the "true" blue whales in a number of physical characteristics. It has:

- broader and shorter baleen plates
- a shorter tail, and hence a proportionately longer body in front of the dorsal fin
- a larger head relative to body size
- a heavier body weight compared to other blue whales of the same length

Pygmy blue whales reach sexual maturity at 10 years of age and a length of 19.2 m (63 ft), weighing on average 52.5 t (51.7 long tons; 57.9 short tons). As adults, males average 21.1 m (69 ft) and females 21.9 m (72 ft), with most probably between 20.7 and 22.5 m (68 and 74 ft). The calculated average weight is 75.5 t (74.3 long tons; 83.2 short tons) for males and 90 t (89 long tons; 99 short tons) for females. A whale at the maximum known size of 24.1–25 m (79–82 ft) would weigh in the range of 129.5–180 t (127.5–177.2 long tons; 142.7–198.4 short tons). The individual stranded on a Taranaki beach in 2011 was 22.5 m (74 ft) long and weighed 60–80 t (59–79 long tons; 66–88 short tons), while the individual stranded off the coast of New Plymouth in 2014 was 19.5 m (64 ft) long and weighed 100 t (98 long tons; 110 short tons). The specimen discovered in Busselton, Australia in 2025 is estimated to have been 24 m (79 ft) long. In 2021 and 2022, 42 Pygmy blue whales were photographed and measured to be between 15.3–24.3 m (50–80 ft) in length.

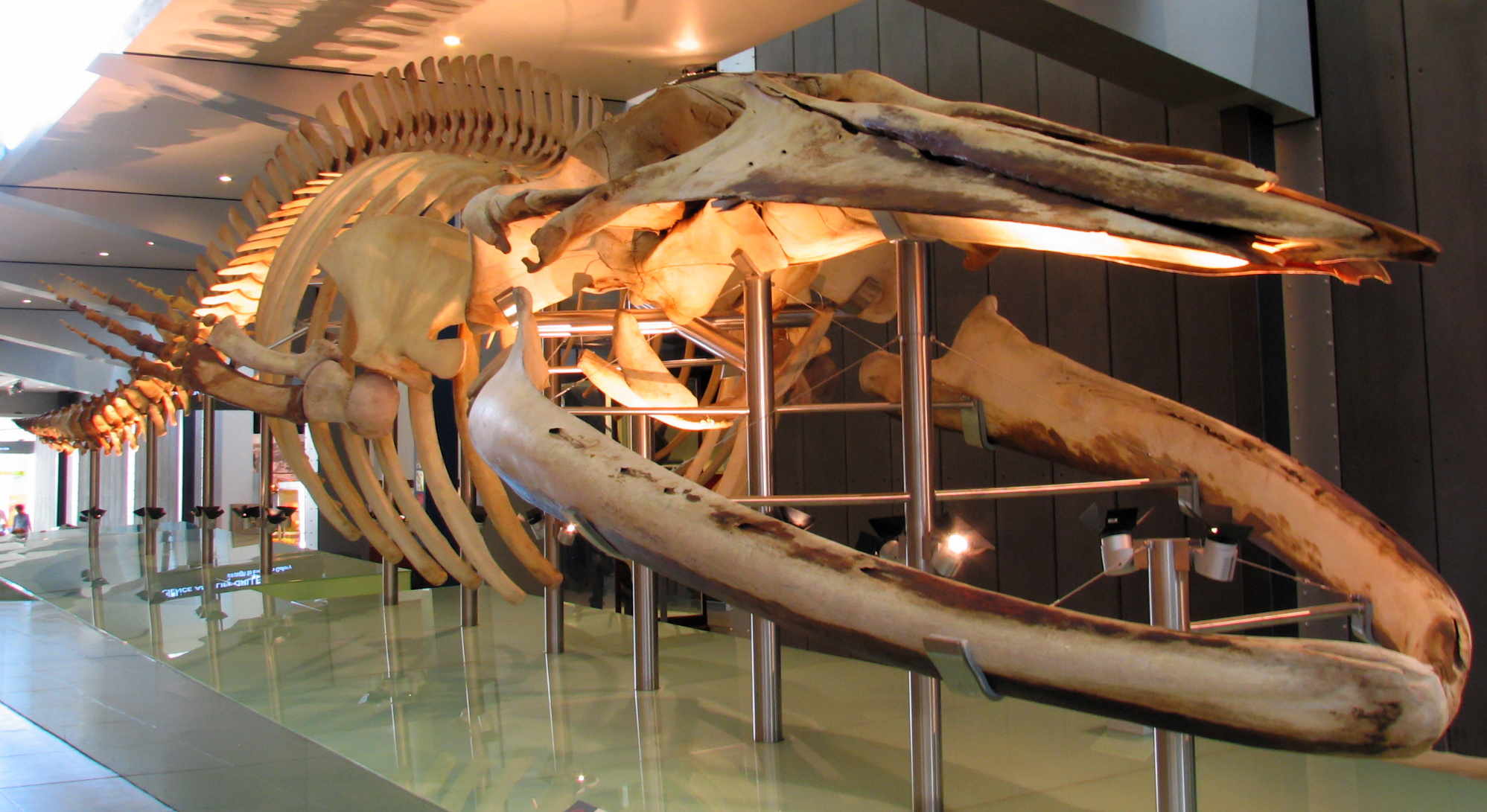
Front view of skeleton

The shorter tail gives the pygmy blue whale more of a tadpole-like shape, and reflects in differences in diving behavior: whereas in the "true" blues, there is a delay between the submergence of the dorsal fin and the caudal peduncle; in pygmy blue whales, the dorsal and peduncle submerge simultaneously. Pygmy blue whales also tend to be darker than the other subspecies of blue whales, and the shape of their blowhole is different. The pygmy blue whale's skull was 4.86 meters (15.9 ft), and the ribs had a maximum straight length of 2.625 meters (8 ft 7.3 in).

Using earwax analysis to estimate age, the maximum lifespan of a pygmy blue whale is 65 years for females and 73 years for males. Another study estimated that pygmy whales, measuring between 12.5–23.5 m (41–77 ft) in length and up to 58 years old, reached sexual maturity at 5 to 6 years and physical maturity at 10 to 12 years, reaching a length of 20–21 m (66–69 ft). Another study estimated that both males and females reach physical maturity at ages 15–22.

== Range ==
The pygmy blue whale is the only one of the three identifiable subspecies to be found regularly in tropical waters. It occurs from the sub-Antarctic zone to the southern Indian Ocean and southwestern Pacific Ocean, breeding in the Indian and South Atlantic oceans, and travelling south to above the Antarctic to feed, although they very rarely cross the Antarctic Convergence. However, it is possible that the species was also included among blue whales captured in the Antarctica region south of 60°S south latitude.

== Foraging behaviour ==
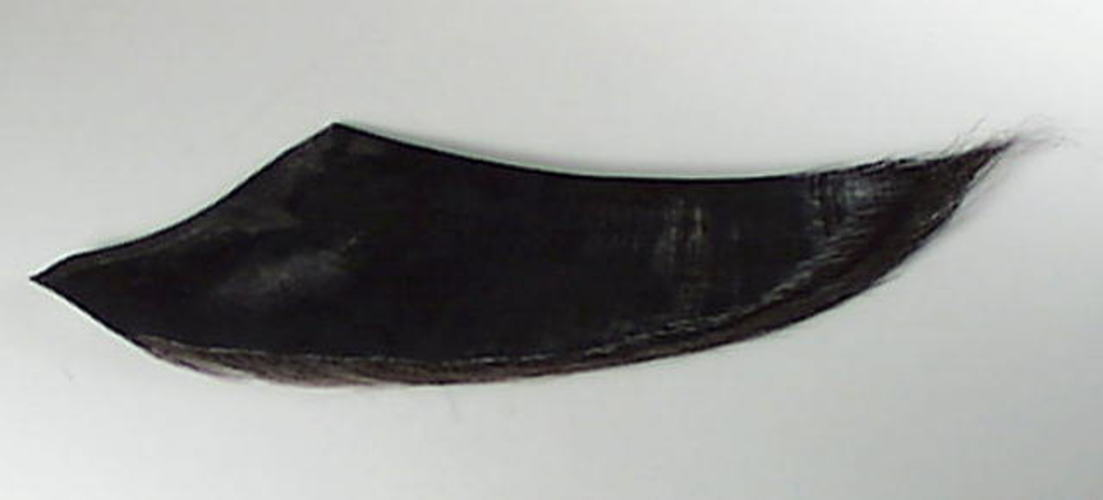
Baleen

The presence of pygmy blue whales is strongly linked to prey availability, with upwelling being a strong predictor. The pygmy blue whale feeds on krill that are smaller and more ephemeral, compared to the diet of the Antarctic blue whale. Conditions favourable for krill are created in the Perth Canyon area, which results in aggregations of euphausiid species, including krill. This attracts pygmy whales while they are on their northern migration. Aggregations of their preferred krill are also found along the south eastern Australia "Bonney" coast during the late autumn and summer. This is where The Bonney Upwelling occurs, which results in cold, nutrient-rich waters coming up to the surface from the deep sea and submarine canyons, allowing krill to flourish. Pygmy blue whales are attracted to the Bonney coast due to the abundance of krill, with three zones being utilised by them – the central, eastern, and western zone. At these areas of large krill aggregations, pygmy blue whales undertake feeding lunges and pass large amounts of seawater through the bristles of their baleen plates to filter the water and capture prey.

== Diving behaviour ==
The migratory dives of pygmy blue whales minimise energy expenditure by maintaining the bottom depth to where wave drag is minimised. This is just below the depth threshold of where the effect of surface drag on the whale is removed. It allows the whale to save energy and maximise horizontal movement by keeping drag at a minimum and staying close to the surface for air supply. This strategy places them at a higher risk of ship strike, as the range of their migratory dives overlaps with those of large container ship drafts, which is less than 24m.

Along with migratory dives, they perform feeding dives, which include a lunge, and exploratory dives, which are relatively deep dives that do not include a lunge.

Feeding dives: Mean maximum depth: 129 ± 183 m. Mean dive duration: 7.6 min. Maximum dive duration: 17.5 min.

Migratory dives: Mean bottom depth of migratory dives: 14 ± 4 m. Mean dive duration: 5.2 min. Maximum dive duration: 26.7 min.

Exploratory dives: Mean maximum depth: 107 ± 81 m. Mean dive duration: 8.6 min. Maximum dive duration: 22.05 min.

Pygmy blue whales spend over 90% of their time in the top 24m of the water column, and the mean depth is less than 24m for 99% of their migratory dives. Their diving behaviour also reflects the structure of their songs, with them commonly performing depth undulations that coincide with song production patterns.

== Acoustic behaviour ==
Pygmy blue whale populations can be differentiated acoustically, with each producing calls with slight differences. They do not show any other morphological differences, and genetic data is limited. Three of the four distinct call types attributed to blue whales in the Indian Ocean are attributed to pygmy whales. These were first recorded in Madagascar, Sri Lanka, and Australia. In 1984, the Sri Lanka call was first recorded, with the Madagascar call being recorded following this, in 1996. The most common call type was the Sri Lanka call. There are differences in the three call types regarding frequency content and modulation, as well as the number of units, which suggests how these are from three distinct 'acoustic populations.' The calls are composed of units, which are sections of the song separated by a period of silence. The call of the Madagascan pygmy blue whale has two units, and the call of the Sri Lankan pygmy blue whale has three units. The most complex call is of the Australian pygmy blue whale, which is considered to be three units with several variations in the order of the units. The function of the calls has been related to the prevention of interbreeding between different populations. It has also been related to helping with navigation, prey detection, and encouraging pair formation, as songs are detected year-round at high-latitude feeding areas. The whales are more vocally active during the night compared to the day. There are links to climate cycles affecting the behaviour of pygmy blue whales, with there being up to 10 times more directions of songs during La Niña compared to in neutral or El Nino years.

== Predation ==
The only known natural predator of the pygmy blue whale is the orca, and there have been three reported predations to date. The first victim was estimated to be an adult between 18–22 meters (59–72 ft).

== Threats ==
The migratory route of pygmy blue whales goes through locations that come in contact with offshore oil and gas activities, fisheries, and shipping routes, which exposes them to the main threats of vessel collisions, entanglement in fishing gear, noise interferences, and pollution.

== Human interaction ==
In September 2024, a 15 meters (50 ft) long pygmy blue whale was found stranded between wooden pilings supporting a pier off the coast of Kawau Island, New Zealand. The whale appeared slightly anxious when the barge approached, but soon resumed normal breathing patterns. It remained calm throughout the pier removal process, and was released at 6 p.m. after the pier was removed in mid-afternoon.

== Conservation status ==
The pygmy blue whale is considered "data deficient" on the IUCN Red List of Threatened Species. All whales are covered by the Memorandum of Understanding for the Conservation of Cetaceans and Their Habitats in the Pacific Islands Region (Pacific Cetaceans MoU).

A new population of pygmy blue whales was discovered in the Indian Ocean in 2017, with the aid of nuclear bomb detectors. The Chagos population was determined to be undiscovered before by their unique song.

== Specimens ==
- MNZ MM002191, collected Motutapu Island, Hauraki Gulf, New Zealand, September 1994, now in Te Papa collection.
- Skull, collected in New Caledonia, now at Maritime Museum of New Caledonia.
