= Dumbéa =

Commune of New Caledonia

- Commune
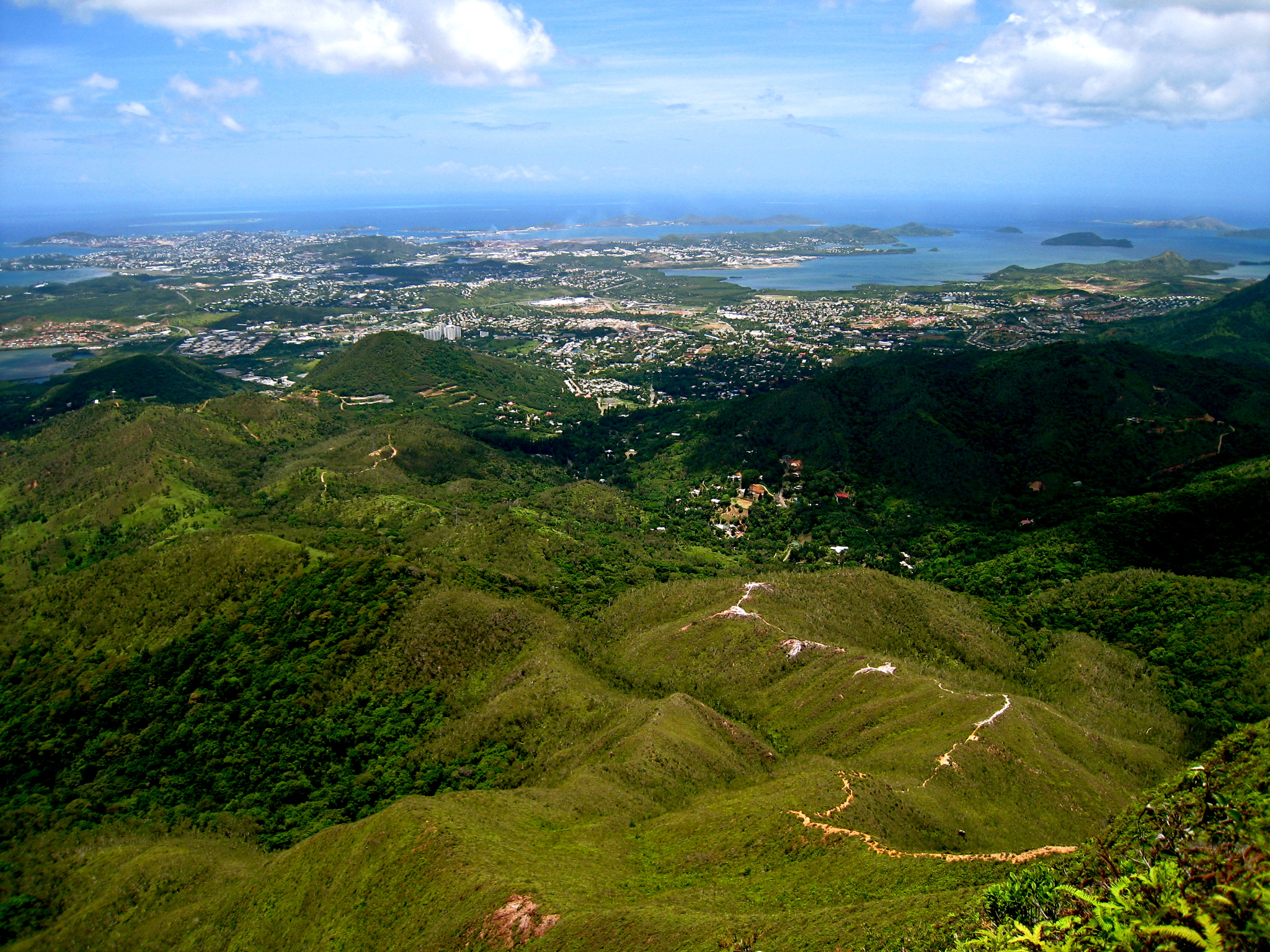
- Aerial view of Dumbéa

- Coat of arms

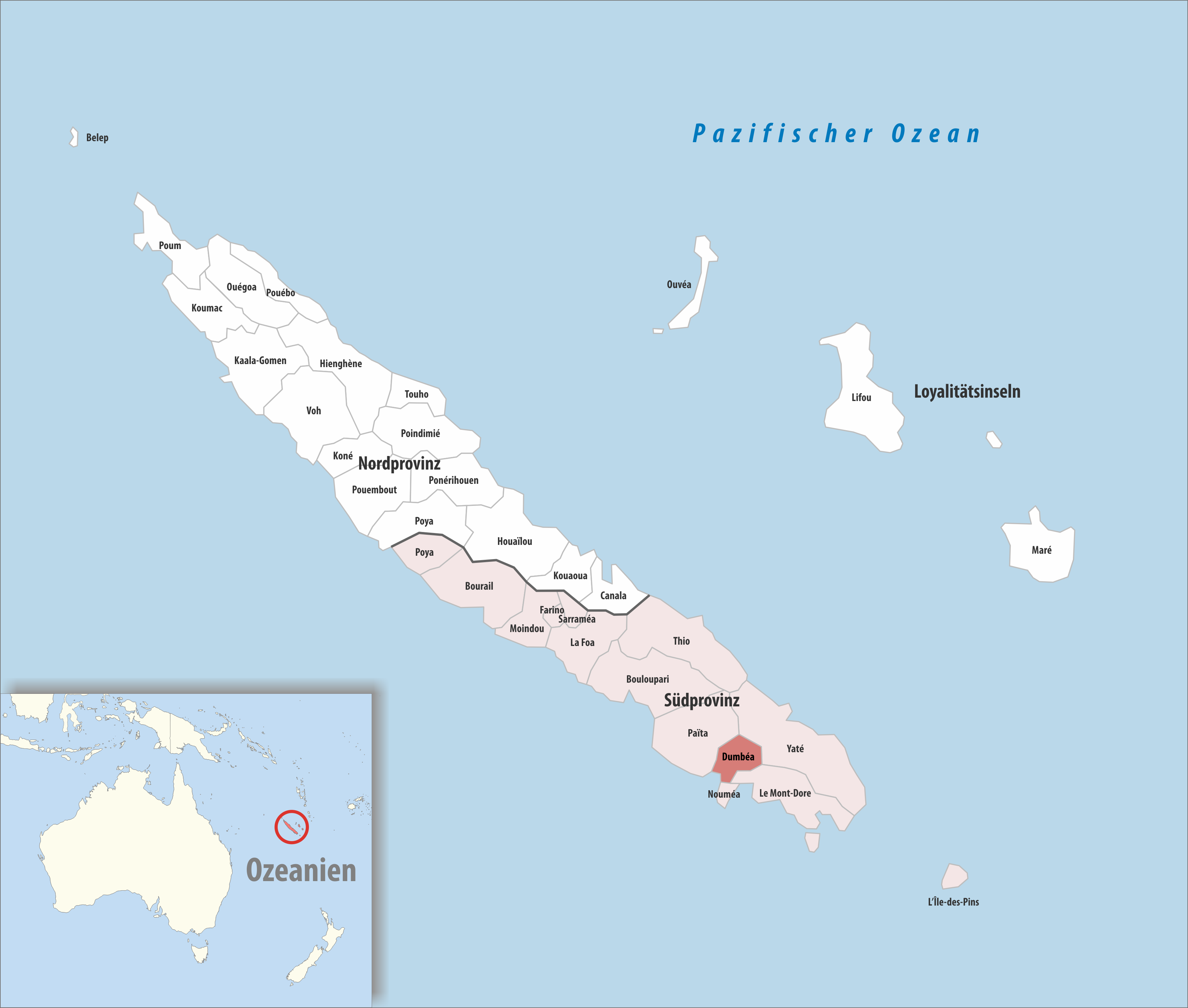
- Location of the commune (in red) within New Caledonia
- Location of Dumbéa
- Coordinates: 22°09′S 166°27′E
- Country: France
- Sui generis collectivity: New Caledonia
- Province: South Province

Government
  - Mayor (2023–2026): Yoann Lecourieux
- Area^{1}: 254.6 km^{2} (98.3 sq mi)
- Elevation: 20 m (66 ft)
- Highest elevation: 1,250 m (4,100 ft)
- Lowest elevation: 0 m (0 ft)
- Population (2019): 35,873
  - Density: 140.9/km^{2} (364.9/sq mi)

Ethnic distribution
  - 2019: Kanaks 29.61% Europeans 19.08% Wallisians and Futunans 18.24% Mixed 14.54% Other 18.53%
- Time zone: UTC+11:00
- INSEE/Postal code: 98805 /98835
- ^{1} New Caledonia Land Register (DITTT) data, which exclude lakes and ponds larger than 1 km² (0.386 sq mi or 247 acres) as well as the estuaries of rivers.

Dumbéa (/dʌm.beɪ.ə/; French: [dœ̃bea]; Dumbea: [ɳɖùmbea]) is a commune in the suburbs of Greater Nouméa in the South Province of New Caledonia, an overseas territory of France in the Pacific Ocean. The population of the commune was 35,873 according to the 2019 census.

From 1904 to 1940 the town was linked to Nouméa by the Nouméa-Païta railway.

== Population ==
Historical population
Year	Pop.	±% p.a.
1956	284	—
1963	463	+7.23%
1969	1,304	+18.84%
1976	4,191	+18.15%
1983	5,538	+4.06%
1989	10,052	+10.45%
1996	13,888	+4.73%
2004	18,602	+3.72%
2009	24,103	+5.32%
2014	31,812	+5.71%
2019	35,873	+2.43%
Source: ISEE

== Twin towns – sister cities ==
Dumbéa is twinned with:

- Fréjus, France (1985)
- Lifou, New Caledonia (2000)
- Port Vila, Vanuatu (2003)
- Poum, New Caledonia (2014)
- Punaauia, French Polynesia (1991)
