= Nouméa-Païta railway =

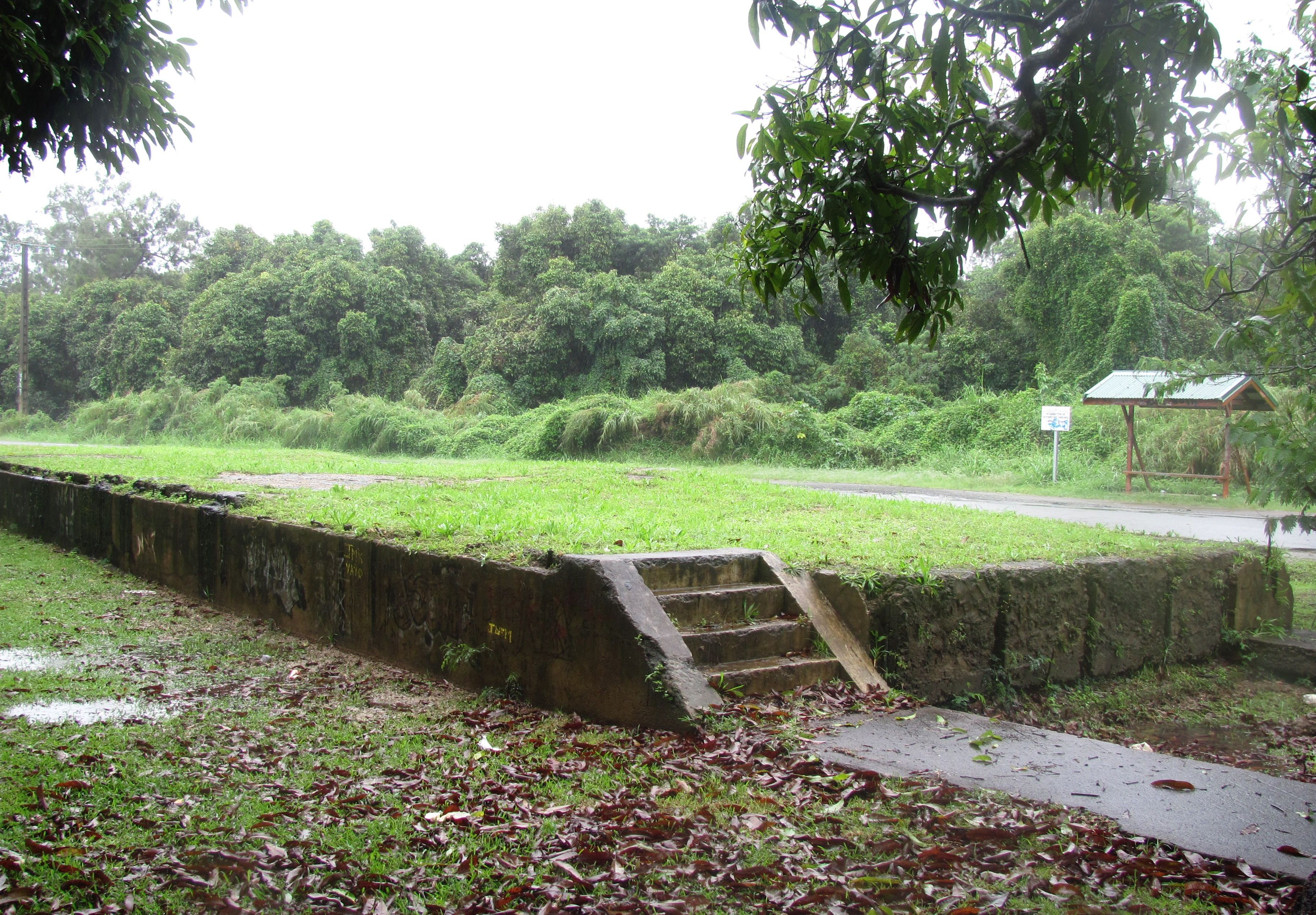
- Former station platform of Païta

Overview
- Status: Suppressed
- Locale: New Caledonia
- Termini: Nouméa; Païta
- Stations: 8

History
- Opened: 1904
- Closed: 1940

Technical
- Line length: 29 km (18 mi)
- Number of tracks: Single track
- Track gauge: 1,000 mm (3 ft 3 3/8 in)

The Nouméa-Païta railway was, apart from several narrow gauge industrial railway lines, the only metre-gauge railway line serving New Caledonia. It was opened in December 1914 between Nouméa, the capital, and Dumbéa in 1904 and extended to Païta in 1914. The 1,000 mm (3 ft 3 3/8 in) narrow gauge railway traveled the 29 kilometers (18 mi) between the two cities in one hour and fifteen minutes.

== History ==
The idea of a railway connecting Nouméa to Canala on the North coast of the island 166 km (103 mi) Northwest of Noumea was first approved by governor Pallu de la Barrière in 1884. But money failed as the Conseil General hesitated to give the required loan necessary for the enterprise. The following governor Paul Feillet was able to elect a Conseil General who borrowed the sum necessary for the execution of a program of works including the construction of a railway.

The line was inaugurated August 17, 1901, but opened to users first on December 30, 1904. The ambitious initial project had been considerably truncated as the line stopped at Dumbéa. The deep cut to bring the line across a hill and the Tonghoué Tunnel, generated work for four years and created some permanent jobs. But the line carried passengers and goods only 17 km (11 mi), to the cost of more than four and a half million francs.

In 1908, the Société des Charbonnages de Nouvelle-Calédonie, which exploited the deposits of Nondoué, proposed to build at its own expense a Dumbéa-Païta section. The Conseil General adopted the project, contracted a new loan and the works. The new section, which required the construction of a 79 m (259 ft) bridge over the Dumbéa and the opening of a second tunnel, was to require four years of work. On January 1, 1914 the Nouméa-Païta line was inaugurated, with 29 km (18 mi) traveled in a little over an hour and a half, with ten stops and a compulsory stop at Dumbéa, between the departure station and the arrival station.

The operating accounts were balanced in 1908 but from 1912 the situation began to decline. The reasons were epidemic of plague, the Great War, the competition of buses in the twenties and the world economic crisis. In November 1939, a decision was made to temporarily stop the operation of the railway. The Nouméa-Païta railway closed on 1 January 1940 owing to low ridership, the deficit of the company and rolling stock and tracks in poor condition.

In April 1942, the American 790th Railway Transportation Company reopened the line to operate railways for the Allied presence on New Caledonia.

After the Americans left the line was abandoned and demolished. The remains of the former railway station of Païta remain in the north of the town. The loading platform and the ramp are well-preserved and the foundations of various buildings are still visible. A small locomotive, nicknamed Marguerite, is preserved on the former railway ground. The locomotive was used until 1940. The narrow gauge track, however, was dismantled and the former alignment of the railway track is no longer visible.

== Route ==
The line counted eight stations within the three municipalities of the Southern Province. It started in Nouméa city centre and counted a secondary station in the ward (Grand Quartier) of Riviére Salée. It crossed the villages of Auteuil and Col de Tonghoué before entering Dumbéa. After, the line crossed the village of Nondoué and Mount Mou, the nearby mountain, a few kilometres before the last station, Païta. It counted a pair of tunnels (Tunnel de Tonghoué and Tunnel de l'Erambéré) and three bridges over the rivers La Ouanéoué, La Dumbéa and Karikouié.

== Gallery ==
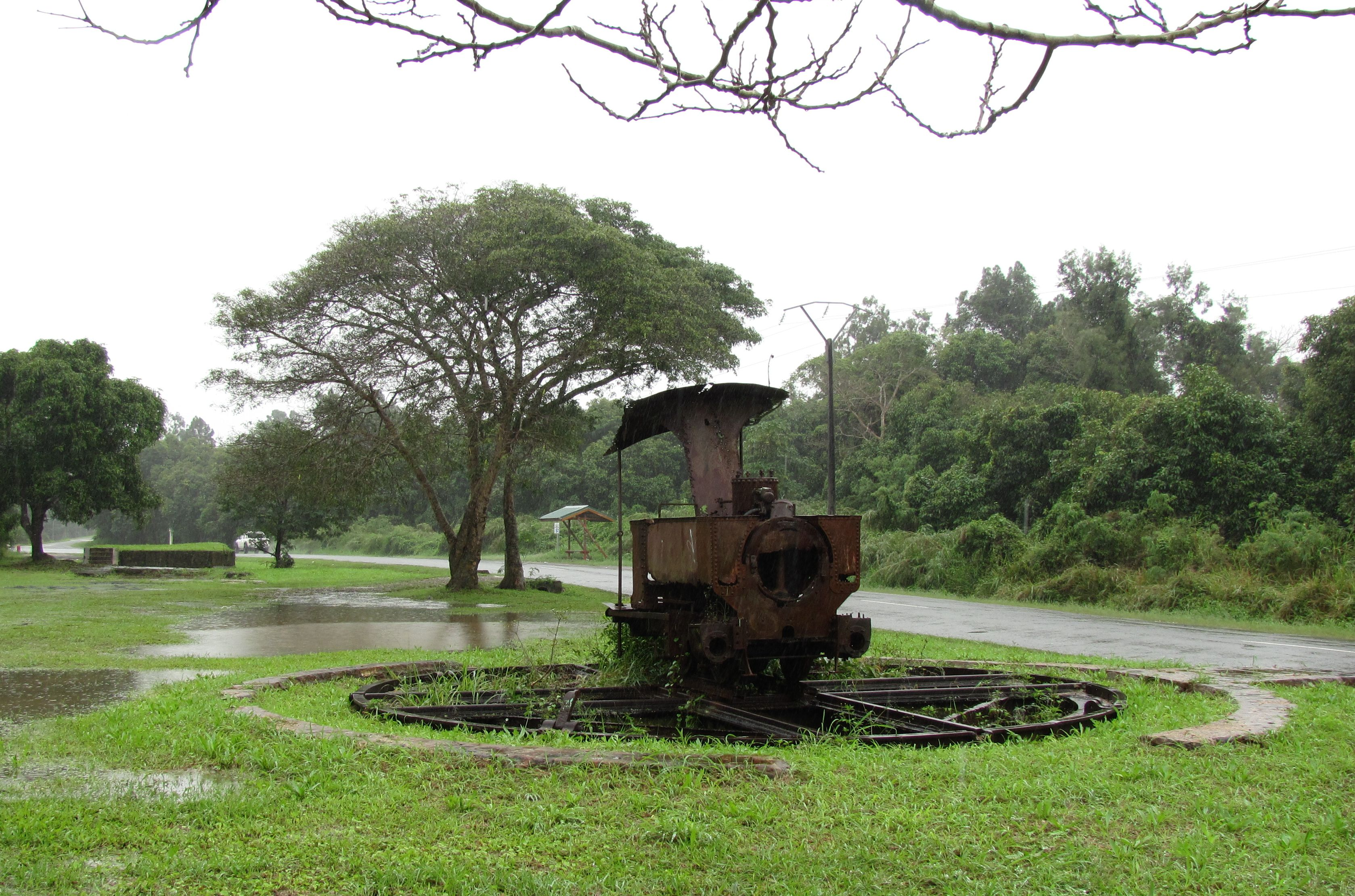
Locomotive Marguerite

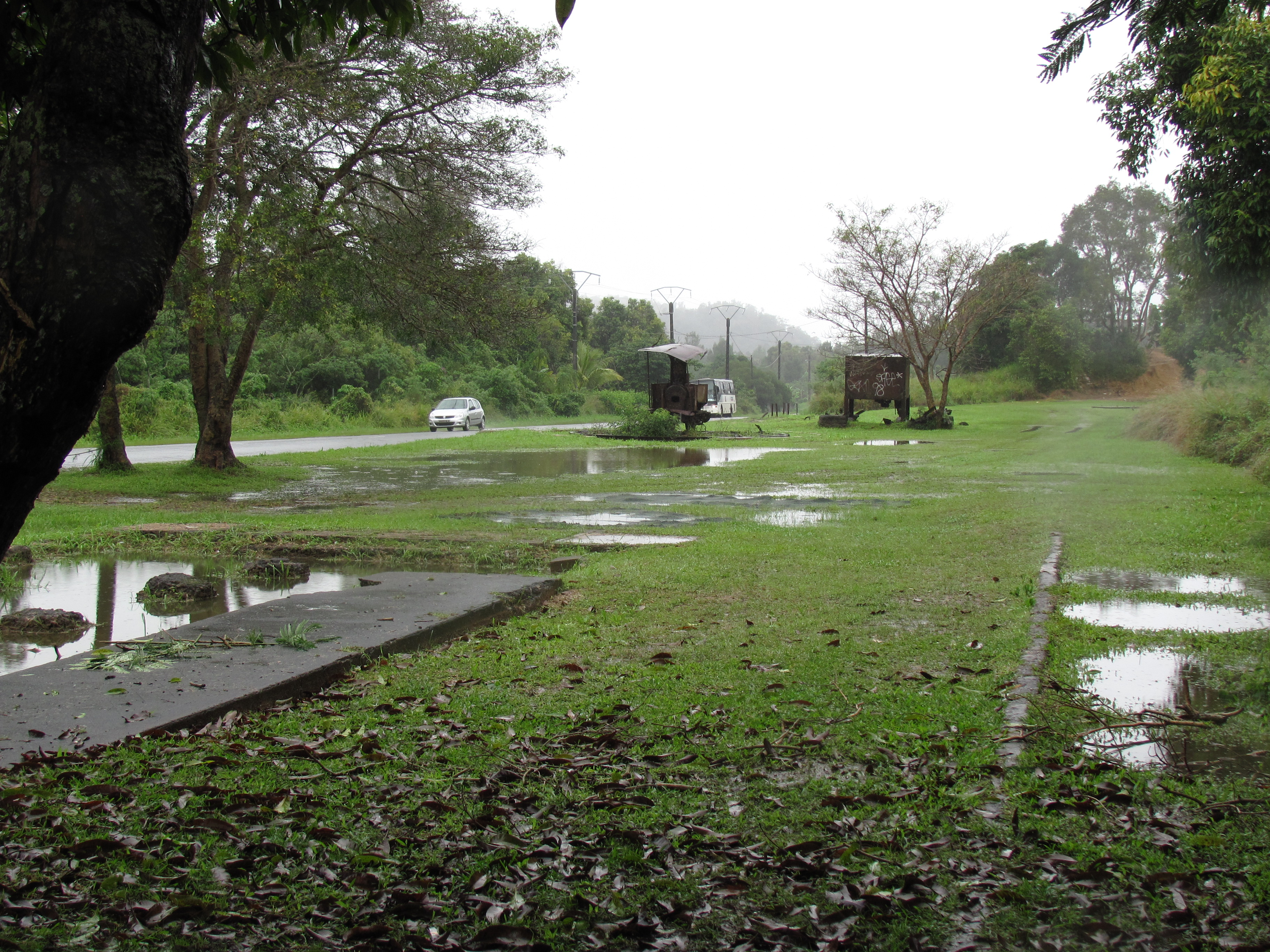
Former station of Païta

== Locomotives ==
Manufacturer	Works No	Year	Power	Type	Gauge	Weight	Name	Remarks
Decauville	N° 637	1911	Steam	2-6-0T	1,000 mm	27,5 t	I. Puech	
Decauville	N° 638	1911	Steam	2-6-0T	1,000 mm	27,5 t	C. Caulry	
L. Corpet & L Louvet			Steam	0-6-0T	1,000 mm	ca. 25-30 t	Courbet	
L. Corpet & L Louvet			Steam	0-6-0T	1,000 mm	ca. 25-30 t	P. Feillet	
Orenstein & Koppel		1930	Steam	0-6-0T	1,000 mm	ca. 20 t		Rot
Orenstein & Koppel		1930	Steam	0-6-0T	1,000 mm	ca. 20 t		Schwarz
General Electric	USA 7755	May 1943	Diesel	0-6-0	1,000 mm	25 t		
General Electric	USA 7756	May 1943	Diesel	0-6-0	1,000 mm	25 t		
E. E. Baculey, Burton-on-Trent		1941	Diesel	0-4-0	1,000 mm		No. 2	
Brookville			Diesel	0-4-0	1,000 mm			Two small diesel engines
Locally built				0-4-0	1,000 mm			Shunter with Jeep engine
