= List of museums in New Caledonia =

This is a list of museums in New Caledonia.

- Jean-Marie Tjibaou Cultural Centre
- Memorial Convict Museum
- Museum of New Caledonia
- Nouméa City Museum
- Museum of the town of Païta
- New Caledonia Maritime History Museum

== See also ==
- List of museums
