= Maritime Museum of New Caledonia =

- Musée Maritime de Nouvelle Calédonie
- Established: 1999
- Location: Nouméa
- Type: Maritime museum
- Key holdings: La Pérouse collection
- Collections: Maritime, industrial, natural science
- Director: Valerie Vattier
- Website: museemaritime.nc

The Maritime Museum of New Caledonia (French: Musée Maritime de Nouvelle Caledonie) is a maritime museum in New Caledonia. It is largely dedicated to the history of French colonial exploration in the Pacific and the collection includes objects retrieved from the frigates Astrolabe and Boussole, which were wrecked under the captaincy of Jean-François de Galaup de Lapérouse.

== Background ==
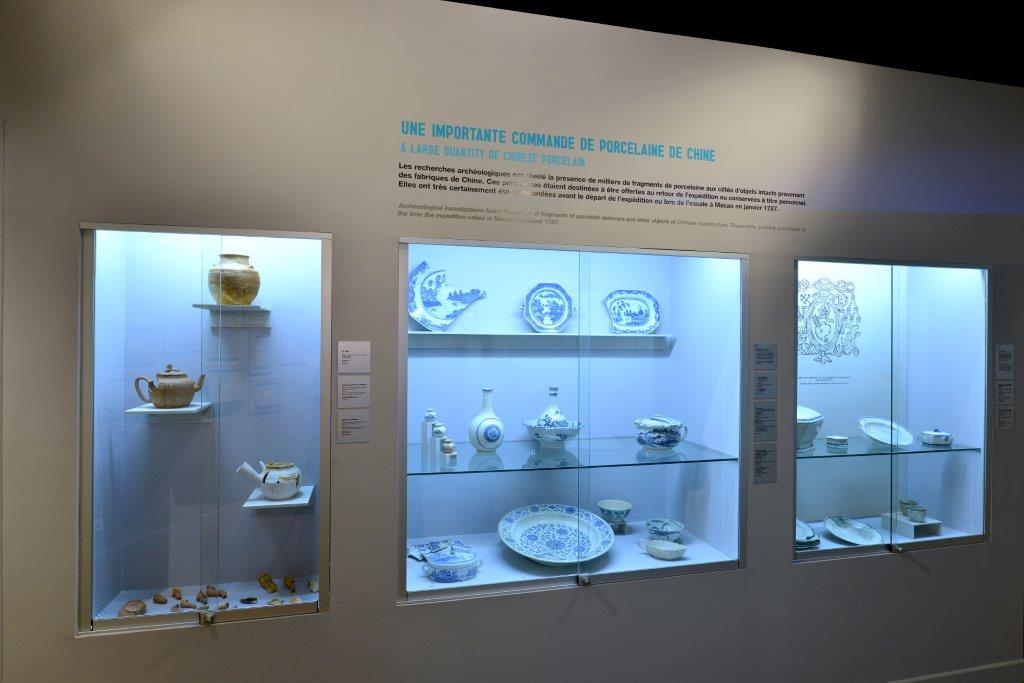
Chinese ceramics from Lapérouse's wrecks

The museum is located near the Betico ferry terminal in Nouméa. It occupies a former maritime station that was donated by the Autonomous Port of New Caledonia. The museum opened in 1999. In 2009, a commemorative stamp was issued to celebrate the tenth anniversary of the museum. The museum was renovated in 2013, which involved the creation of new galleries.

In 2021, the museum opened a new temporary exhibition on the history of the cruise and the journey by sea from France to the territory. It runs educational activities for primary and secondary school students.

== Collection ==
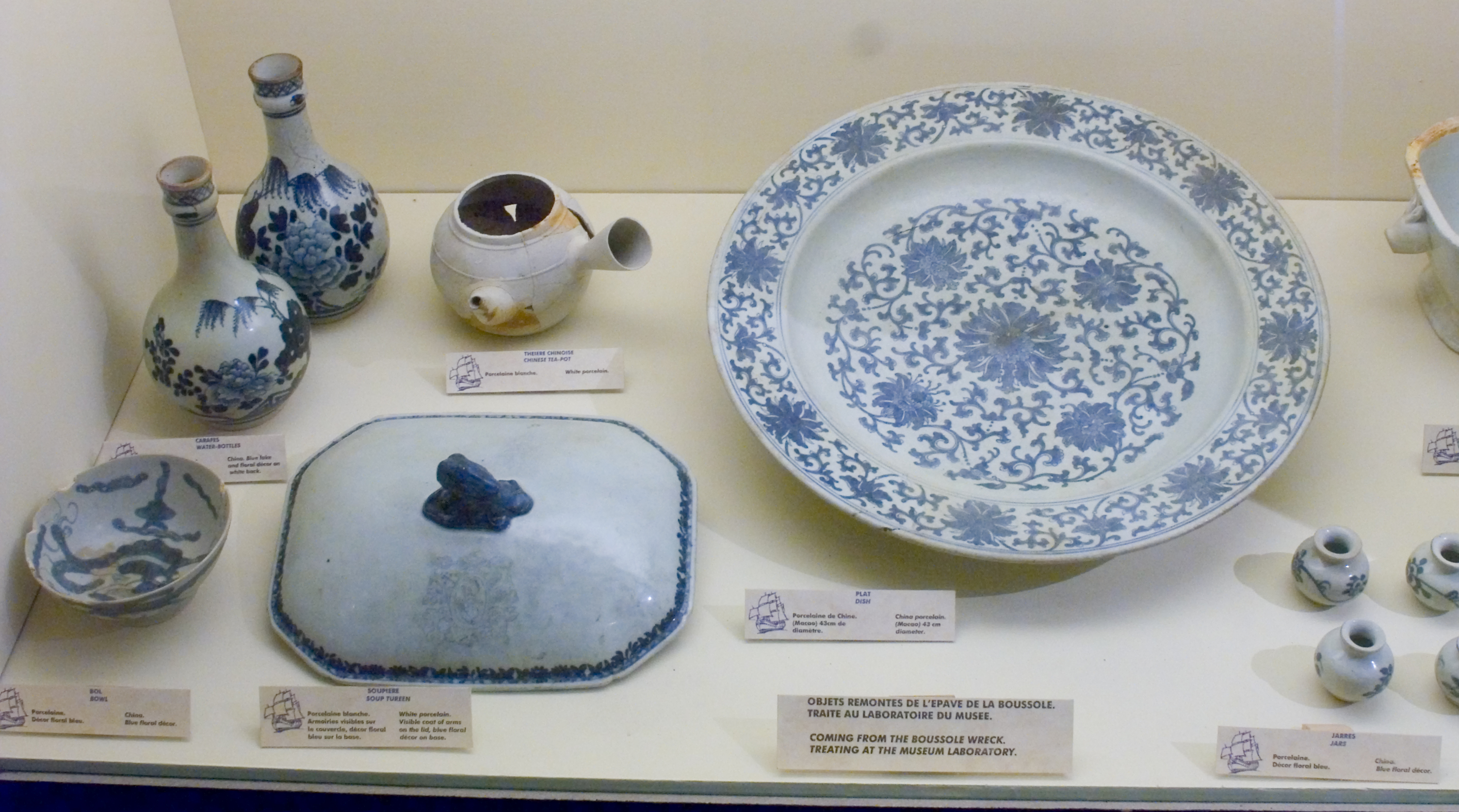
Close up of ceramics

The museum's collection includes artefacts collected from the wrecks of the frigates Astrolabe and Boussole, which had been captained by Jean-François de Galaup de Lapérouse, a naval officer commissioned by Louis XVI to explore the Pacific. It also contain objects relating other voyages to New Caledonia in the colonial period, to missionary activity, and to the history of nickel. The museum collection also includes the skull of a pygmy blue whale.

Museologists have commented that the museum focusses on French, rather than indigenous, maritime histories.
