= French diaspora =

French emigrants and their descendants

Diaspora française

Total population
- c. 30 million (France: 68.6 million)

Regions with significant populations
- Canada, United States, Argentina, United Kingdom, Belgium, Brazil, Switzerland, Peru, Chile, Uruguay, South Africa, Madagascar, and Australia

The French diaspora (French: Diaspora française) consists of French people and their descendants living outside France. Countries with significant numbers of people with French ancestry include Canada and the United States, whose territories were partly colonized by France between the 16th and 19th centuries, as well as Argentina. Although less important than in other European countries, immigration from France to the New World was numerous from the start of the 19th century to the middle of the 20th century. As of 2013, French authorities estimate that between 2 and 3.5 million French nationals are living abroad but the diaspora includes over 30 million people.

== History ==
Several events have led to emigration from France. The Huguenots started leaving in the 16th century, a trend that dramatically increased following the 1685 revocation of the Edict of Nantes. French colonization, especially in the Americas, was prominent in the late 17th and 18th centuries. At the end of the 18th century, French emigration (1789–1815) was a massive movement of émigrés mostly to neighboring European countries, as a result of the violence caused by the French Revolution. Later emigration was often associated with economic conditions. From 1847 to 1857, almost 200,000 French people emigrated abroad. From 1821 to 1920, around 121,000 Basques and Bearnese people from Basses-Pyrénées emigrated to America—more than 108,000 from 1835 to 1901.

As of 2016, the exact number of people who fled from France during the Revolutionary-era is not known. Between 1848 and 1939, 1 million people with French passports emigrated to other countries. In the Western Hemisphere, the main communities of French ancestry are found in the United States, Canada and Argentina. Sizeable groups are also found in Brazil, Chile, Mexico, Uruguay, South Africa, Germany, the United Kingdom and Australia.

Destinations of French immigrants from 1857 to 1860
Destination	Number of immigrants	% immigrants
Europe	12,278	23.66%
Algeria	17,823	34.35%
Other countries	456	0.88%
North America	9,999	19.27%
South America	10,252	19.77%
Australia	121	0.23%
Canada	33	0.06%
French colonies	86	0.16%
Other countries	839	1.62%
Total	51,887	100%

Frenchmen abroad from 1861 to 1931
Country	1861	1881-6	1901	1911	1931
Britain	13,000	26,600	22,450	32,000	15,000
Jersey	2,780	–	8,100	8,500	7,000
Belgium	35,000	52,000	56,580	80,000	80,000
Russia	2,479	5,760	8,000	12,000	1,500
Germany	6,429	1,756	20,480	19,000	15,000
Switzerland	45,000	54,260	58,520	64,000	40,000
Italy	4,718	10,900	6,950	8,000	9,000
Spain	10,642	17,600	20,560	20,000	20,000
Total for Europe	128,000	185,000	220,000	269,000	220,000
Egypt	14,207	15,700	10,200	11,500	18,000
Asia (mainly China)	4,000	5,000	7,000	10,000	11,000
US	108,870	106,900	104,000	125,000	127,000
Canada	3,173	4,400	7,900	25,000	21,000
Mexico	3,500	8,800	4,000	4,000	6,000
Argentina	9,196	20,000	24,100	10,000	40,000
Brazil	592	28,000	12,000	14,000	14,000
Chile	4,650	6,198	17,800	20,000	9,000
Uruguay	23,000	14,300	12,900	9,500	8,000
Total for South America	56,000	92,000	130,000	138,000	113,000
Total for the world	318,000	426,000	495,000	600,000	535,000

== List of countries by population of French heritage ==
Country	Population	% of country	Criterion
French Caledonian	71,721	29.2%	New Caledonia 2009 Census
French Argentine	8,000,000	17%	Canal Academy (Institute of France) citing 2006 data
French Canadian	12,000,000	34%	2016 Canadian Census
French Uruguayan	500,000	15%	Encyclopedia of the Nations
French Chilean	950,000	6%	Yearbook of the French Colony in Chile
French British	3,000,000	4.5%	The Daily Telegraph
French American	11,800,000	4%	2000 United States census
French in South Africa	380,000	2.5%	South African National Census of 2011, Deconstructing Jaco: Genetic Heritage of an Afrikaner
Franco-Mauritian	24,000	2%	
French people in Senegal	40,000	0.75%	
French people in Italy (also including a great number of Piedmontese, as well of Ligurians, Lombards and Sardinian Catalans)	300,000	0.5%	
French Mexican	30,000	0.02%	French Ministry of Europe and Foreign Affairs
French Peruvian	1,000,000	4.2%	Mirror of Peru
French people in Madagascar	123,954	0.618%	Encyclopedia of African History
French people in Switzerland	2,000,000	25%	
French people in Sweden			
French Brazilian	1,000,000	0.5%	La France au Brésil
French Australian	110,399	0.5%	2006 Australian census
French people in the Seychelles	1,900	2%	
French Lebanese	21,428	0.4%	French Ministry of Europe and Foreign Affairs
French people in India	12,864	0.001%	everyculture.com
French people in Belgium	4,500,000	40%	
French New Zealander	3,819	0.01%	The Encyclopedia of New Zealand
Total in diaspora	~40,000,000		
French people	66,000,000		
Total worldwide	~106,000,000		

== Distribution ==
French diaspora France + 10,000,000 + 1,000,000 + 100,000 + 10,000

In the Western Hemisphere, the main communities of French ancestry are found in Canada, the United States and Argentina. Sizeable groups are also found in Australia, Brazil, Chile, Mexico, South Africa and Uruguay.

=== Africa ===
==== Senegal ====
During the period of French rule, there were almost no official controls on settlement by French nationals into the colonies. The European community of Dakar was ruled by the French, but also including Whites from outside France. French men in the colonial administration looked down on the rest of the European population. Aside from the administrators, the French population in Senegal during the period between the world wars contained rich merchant families from Bordeaux as well as smaller traders and their employees, as well as a large transient population of missionaries and travellers. The French required no identity cards or passports to travel in Senegal, making it easy to assume false identities and creating significant difficulties in policing them. Administrators expressed frustration with the influx of criminals and other "undesirables" from metropolitan France, which ran counter to what they saw as the French "civilising mission" to present "morally upright" role models for Africans to emulate. During the Independence of Senegal, there were estimated to be 40,000 French people in the country, three-quarters in Dakar alone in 1960. Though Dakar in particular featured a far higher proportion of non-indigenous population than many surrounding African countries in which racial conflict had become apparent, inter-ethnic relations there were characterised by an "apparent absence of any colour problem". It had been expected that most French citizens would soon return to France after independence, but a decade later, there were still 29,000 living in the country, involved with French aid and capital investment; their presence reflected the continued dependence of France's African colonies on the métropole. Some Senegalese people of French descent had illnesses of meningoencephalitis, staphylococcal infection of the skin, and the like, worsened by their failure or inability to seek medical attention. There are still some of the French who remained in Senegal.

==== Mauritius ====
The first French settlers arrived in Mauritius (then Isle de France) in 1722, after the previous attempts of settlement by the Dutch had failed, and the island had once again become abandoned. They lived and prospered on the island, ruling it until the British invasion of 1810. The French by now strongly identified with the island, and the terms of capitulation allowed the settlers to live on as a distinct francophone ethnic group for the next 158 years under British rule before Mauritius attained independence.

Not all Franco-Mauritians have pure French lineage, many also have British or other European ancestors that came to Mauritius and were absorbed in the Franco-Mauritian community or the gens de couleur (Coloureds). There are an estimated 15,000–20,000 Franco-Mauritians; French lineage is also found within the gens de couleur community with many having predominantly French ancestors—a further 30,000 people with considerable French bloodline. Within the Afro-Creole community, a large number of people have some French ancestors from slavery.

=== Latin America ===
According to estimates, there are more than 8 million people with French ancestry living in Latin America, three-quarters of them in Argentina. Following the independence of Latin American countries in the first decades of the 19th century, a great wave of French immigration towards the region appeared, mainly directed to the River Plate basin. It lasted until the 1960s, when the economic situation in Latin America deteriorated and military dictatorships came into power. During this period of time, Argentina and Uruguay received more than 300,000 French immigrants, appearing as the second destination for French immigration worldwide after the United States.

==== Argentina ====
From the beginning of the 19th century, to the middle of the 20th century, Argentina received the second largest group of French immigrants after the United States. According to official figures 239,000 Frenchmen immigrated to Argentina from 1857 to 1946 but the numbers are higher as immigration started in the 1820s (they formed the largest group of immigrants to the country until 1854) and lasted until the end of the 1960s. Unlike the United States where the immigration from France was more diverse, half of French immigrants to Argentina were from the Southwestern part of the country. As of 2006, it is estimated that more than 8 million Argentines have some degree of French ancestry (17% of the total population).

==== Chile ====
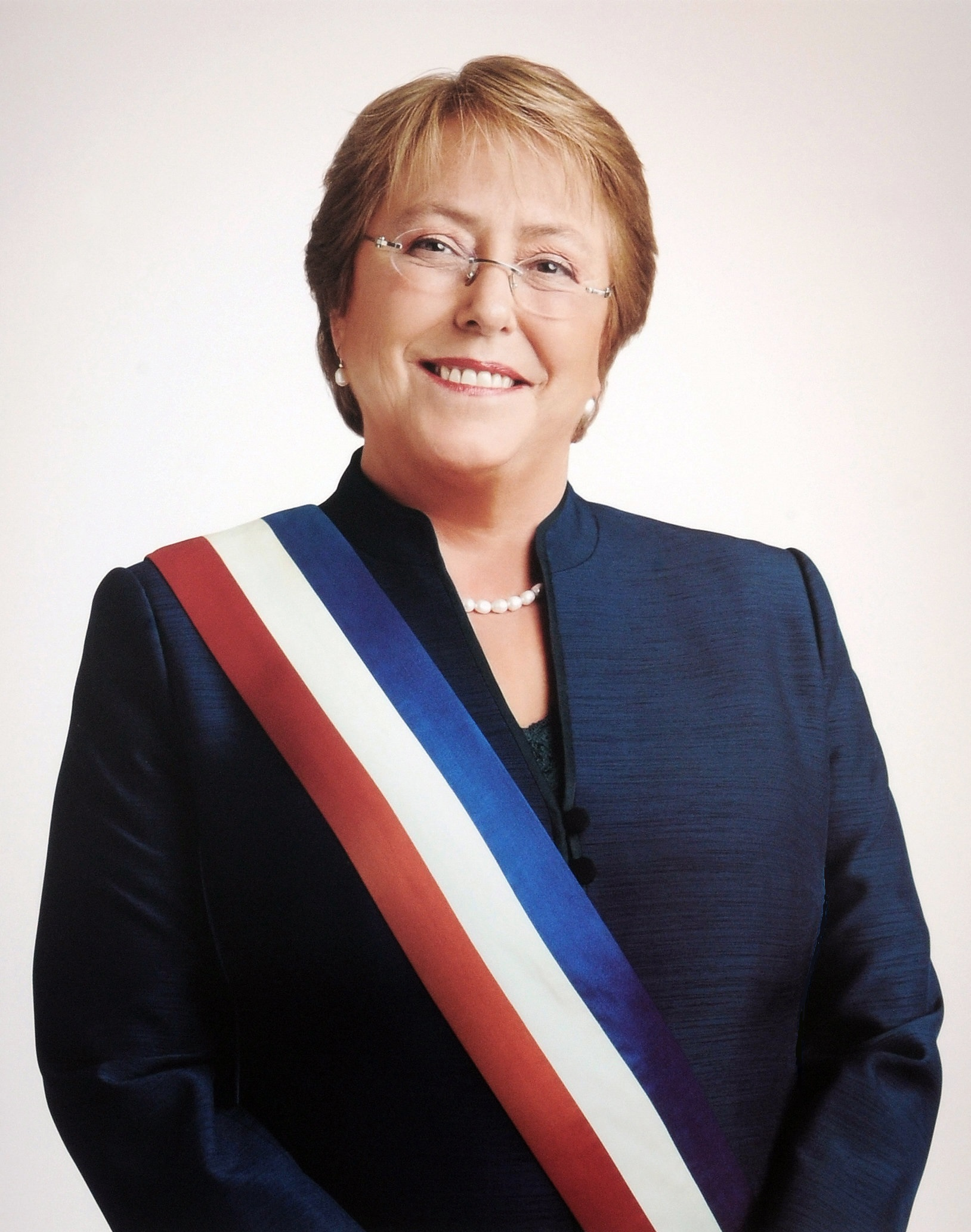
Michelle Bachelet, 33rd and 35th President of Chile is of French descent.

The French came to Chile in the 18th century, arriving at Concepción as merchants, and in the mid-19th century, to cultivate vines in the haciendas of the Central Valley, the homebase of Chilean wine. The Araucanía Region also has an important number of people of French ancestry, as the area hosted settlers arrived by the second half of the 19th century, as farmers and shopkeepers. With akin Latin culture, the French immigrants quickly assimilated into mainstream Chilean society.

From 1880 to 1930, around 80,000 Frenchmen immigrated to Chile. 80% of them were coming from Southwestern France, especially from Basses-Pyrénées (Basque country and Béarn), Gironde, Charente-Inférieure and Charente and regions situated between Gers and Dordogne.

Most of French immigrants settled in the country between 1875 and 1895. Between October 1882 and December 1897, 8,413 Frenchmen settled in Chile. At the end of the 19th century, they were almost 30,000.

In World War II, a group of 10,000 to 20,000 Chileans of French descent joined the Free French Forces and fought the Nazi occupation of France.

Today, it is estimated that there are to 950,000 Chileans of French descent. President Michelle Bachelet is of French origin, as was former dictator Augusto Pinochet. Several prominent politicians, businessmen and professionals in the country have French ancestry.

==== Costa Rica ====
French immigration before the 19th century was scarce. This situation changed over the turn of the 19th century with French migrating mainly from South of France and Bordeaux as a consequence of international trade increase across the Atlantic and the independence from the Spanish Empire.

Official relations between France and Costa Rica began in 1848 in a context of geopolitical stakes for the region as its importance increased as a cross way between the Atlantic and Pacific Ocean. Costa Rica also started to export coffee, and several French emigrants got involved in this activity with The Tournon Company as the leading firm from this community.

Basis for current Costa Rican flag - 1848

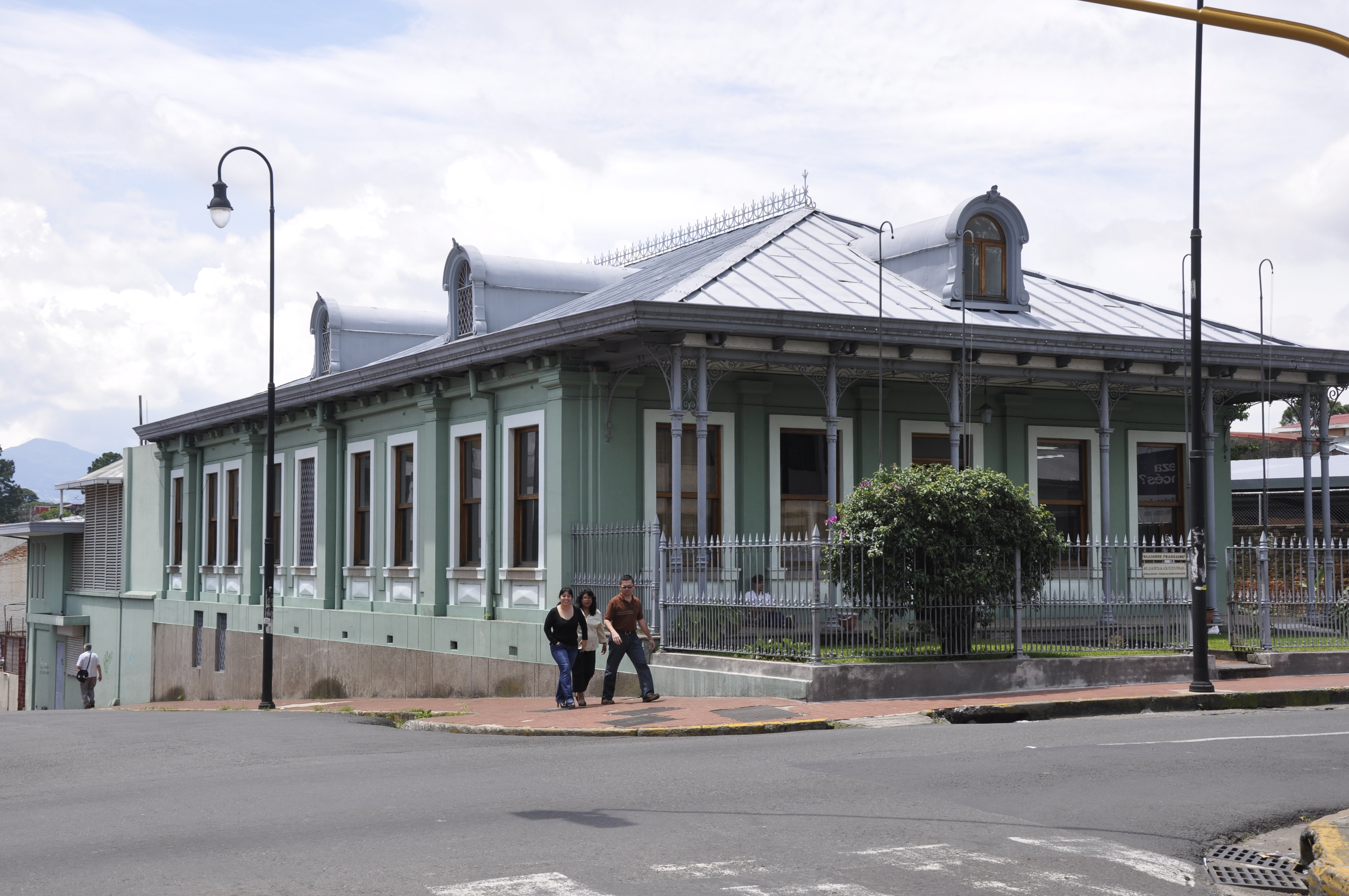
Alliance française located in Barrio Amón, San José

The 19th-century French emigrants and their descendants, as well as France relevant international role had a lasting influence in Costa Rican society in the cultural, artistic and political fields. For instance, Costa Rican flag design was inspired by the French flag. This strong common ground of values also set the base for 20th- and 21st-century relations between both countries supported institutionally through several organizations such as the Organisation internationale de la Francophonie, as well as through the French population in Costa Rica, currently the largest French community in Central America with 2235 habitants.

==== Guatemala ====
The first French immigrants were politicians such as Nicolas Raoul and Isidore Saget, Henri Terralonge and officers Aluard, Courbal, Duplessis, Gibourdel and Goudot. Later, when the Central American Federation was divided in 7 countries, Some of them settled to Costa Rica, others to Nicaragua, although the majority still remained in Guatemala. The relationships start to 1827, politicians, scientists, painters, builders, singers and some families emigrated to Guatemala. Later in a Conservative government, annihilated nearly all the relations between France and Guatemala, and most of French immigrants went to Costa Rica, but these relationships were again return to the late of the nineteenth century.

==== Mexico ====
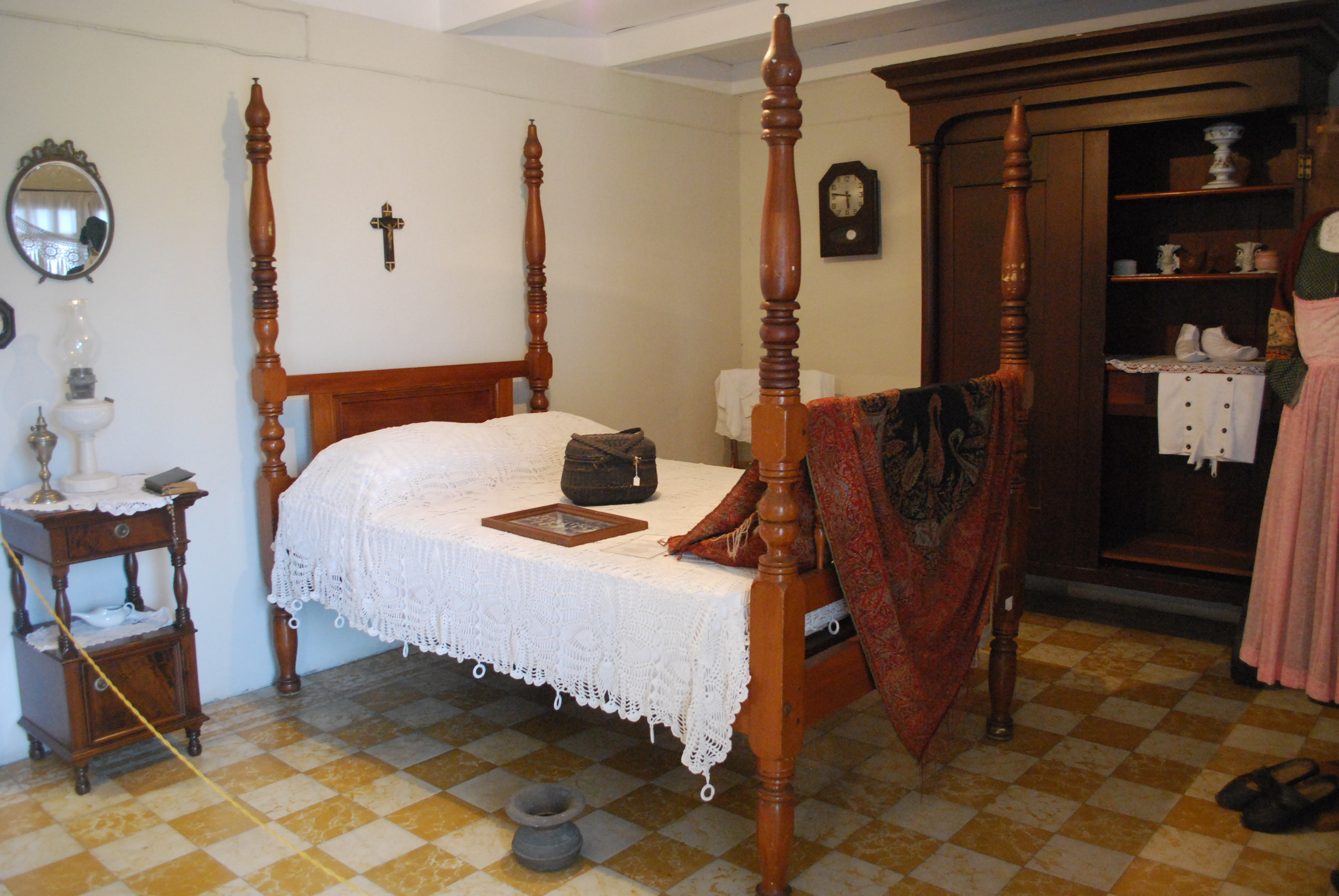
Preserved bedroom at the San Rafael Museum, covering the life of 19th century French immigrants to the Nautla Region of Veracruz

In Mexico, a sizeable population can trace its ancestry to France, which was the second largest European contributor, after Spain. The bulk of French immigrants arrived in Mexico during the 19th and early 20th centuries.

From 1814 to 1955, inhabitants of Barcelonnette and the surrounding Ubaye Valley emigrated to Mexico by the dozens. Many established textile businesses between Mexico and France. Around the start of the 20th century, there were 5,000 French from the Barcelonnette region registered with the French Consulate in Mexico. While 90% stayed in Mexico, some returned, and from 1880 to 1930, built grand mansions called Maisons Mexicaines and left a mark upon the city. Today, there are 60,000 descendants of the French "Barcelonnettes".

In the 1860s, during the Second Mexican Empire ruled by Emperor Maximilian I of Mexico – which was part of Napoleon III's scheme to create a Latin empire in the New World (indeed responsible for coining the term or Amérique latine, or "Latin America") – many French soldiers, merchants, and families set foot upon Mexican soil. Emperor Maximilian's consort, Carlota of Mexico, a Belgian princess, was a granddaughter of Louis-Philippe of France.

Many Mexicans of French descent live in cities such as Zacatecas, San Luis Potosí, Puebla, Guadalajara, and the capital, Mexico D.F., where French surnames such as Derbez, Pierres, Betancourt, Alaniz, Blanc, Jurado (Jure), Colo (Coleau), Marín (Marin), Caire, Dumas, Tresmontrels, and Moussier can be found.

==== Uruguay ====
Nowadays, about 500,000 Uruguayans have French ancestry, i.e. almost 15% of the total population of the country, while they made up a third of it at the end of the 19th century, as a result of a significant immigration from France (quantitywise and percentagewise) between the 1840s and the 1890s. This is now the third largest European ancestry among Uruguayans, after Spanish (60% of them) and Italian (40%). Although declining by the turn of the 20th century, French immigration left a strong cultural and ideological mark in Uruguay, and the country, long considered the most Francophile in Latin America, has been an observing member of the Francophonie since 2012.

During the first half of the 19th century, Uruguay was the main destination for French immigrants in South America and received about 20,000 French immigrants, second only to the United States in the New World, the latter country receiving 195,971 French immigrants between 1820 and 1855. 80% of these immigrants came from the Basque Country, Béarn and Bigorre and mainly settled in Uruguay prior to the Great Siege of Montevideo: at least 13,922 and as much as 17,536 of them arrived between 1833 and 1842, representing from 36.5% to 41.5% of all immigrants these years. French immigrants, and notably Basques, had a great demographic impact on the population of the country at that time, since Uruguay only had 74,000 inhabitants in 1830 and 200,000 in 1842. According to various estimates, there were between 14,000, 18,000 or 25,000 Frenchmen living in the country in the early 1840s, representing a significant part of the total population (7 to 12.5%), especially in the capital where they made up a third of the inhabitants.

Immigration to Uruguay recovered in 1848 and 1,684 French Basques settled in the country from 1848 to 1850, still the exclusive destination for French immigration in the River Plate basin as the French blockade of Buenos Aires lasted until 1850, and around 1,415 between 1850 and 1855, when Argentina had finally overcome Uruguay as the main destination for French immigrants in South America. Until 1853, French Basques formed the most numerous group among all immigrants in Uruguay, and French immigration as a whole remained predominant until 1862, when it definitely became surpassed in numbers by Spaniards and Italians. As a consequence, French immigrants and their Uruguayan-born children made up more than a third of Uruguay's population by 1860, representing a 78,000-strong community in a country still sparsely populated (including future presidents Juan Campisteguy and Juan Idiarte Borda, both born to French Basque parents).

Although less important in proportion than before, immigration from France remained significant in the second half of the 19th century, particularly during the Paraguayan War (1864–1870) and until the 1890s. 2,718 French immigrants were recorded in 1866 and 1867 (10.2%), then 18,299 between 1878 and 1906 (5.7%). Additionally, 2,798 Frenchmen applied for work at the Commissariat-General of Immigration upon arrival in Montevideo from 1868 to 1877, although only a minority of immigrants received these years were going through this procedure (about one-fifth between 1878 and 1890, as a comparison) and actual figures were largely higher. In 1908, the French community (French immigrants and their children) had dropped to 40,000, i.e. 4% of the total population, as the country had attracted massive waves of immigration from Italy and Spain, and had its population multiplied by almost five over half a century. The proportion of Uruguayan people with French ancestry was obviously higher because these figures did not include grandchildren and further descendants of earlier French immigrants.

By the turn of the 20th century, France was no longer the third source of immigration to Uruguay, as emigration from the Western Pyrenees had shifted towards California and the Western United States, more particularly in the 1900s-1920s, and WW1 severely hit French demographics, limiting emigration abroad. Consequently, only 2,964 French immigrants settled in the country from 1913 to 1921 (3.8%). Besides them, 261 Frenchmen were housed at the immigrants' hostelry in Montevideo from 1908 to 1912, and 22 from 1922 to 1924, here again only representing a tiny portion of actual immigrants numbers (less than 7% from 1913 to 1921 in comparison). As the proportion of French immigrants within the total population decreased, the rate of marriages outside the community increased and became the norm in the 1900s, leading to a quicker cultural assimilation than for other ethnic groups. Mass immigration from Europe lasted until the 1930s, when Uruguayan economy collapsed due to the Great Depression. By then, the population, that had doubled since 1900 (but had its foreign component divided by almost two), had acquired its present aspect, with a strong Spanish and Italian mark in the ethnic composition, and a significant French influence.

According to incomplete figures cited above (figures from 1843 to 1877 missing – apart for 1866 and 1867 – as well as from 1907 to 1912, and after 1921), Uruguay therefore received at least around 44,000 to 48,000 French immigrants from 1833 to 1924, and more likely 59,000 to 63,000 (including prospective numbers for 1868–1877, 1907–1912 and 1922–1924), representing about 8 to 9% of total immigrants to the country. These figures are consistent with another source estimating the net immigration from France between 1861 and 1925 at around 18,050. As stated above, the majority of these immigrants came from the Pyrenean region, notably the Basque Country, Béarn and Bigorre. Smaller groups hailed from neighboring Gascon départements, as well as from Provence and the Paris region. For many of them, Uruguay was not a final destination, since a substantial part later emigrated to Argentina or traveled back to France, such as Uruguayan-born French poets Comte de Lautréamont, Jules Laforgue and Jules Supervielle. A majority of them however permanently settled in Uruguay, where they left a lasting influence and established strong cultural and economical ties between both countries, creating for instance the first French chamber of commerce abroad and the oldest Lycée français in the Americas.

=== Northern America ===
According to official censuses, nearly 20 million people in Northern America have French ancestry. A third of them live in the French-speaking province of Quebec, where they form a majority of the population, and where most of French Americans and French Canadians can trace their roots back to, through various waves of emigration since the 17th century. French presence in Northern America dates back to the 16th century, when France established a colonial empire that eventually became absorbed within the United States and Canada (except for Saint Pierre and Miquelon). Nowadays, both countries host the second and seventh largest communities of French expatriates abroad, with a notable concentration in Quebec where they form the largest foreign group.

==== Canada ====
Canada has the second largest community of people outside of France who have identified as being of French descent, close behind the United States. 8.5 million Canadians claim French heritage. The French-speaking province of Quebec has the highest concentration of people with French ancestry in the world: 90% of Quebecers have French roots. They are also found in large numbers in the province of New Brunswick where a third of the population can trace their roots back to France and in Ontario which is home to the second largest community of French Canadians in the country.

French immigration to Canada dates back to the 16th century, with the foundation of Charlesbourg-Royal in 1541. Tadoussac, the oldest surviving French settlement in the Americas, was established in 1599. From 1627 to 1663, the French population in Canada rose from 100 to 2,500 inhabitants. Within this period, it is estimated that around 1,250 French people immigrated to Canada, most of them coming from the provinces of Normandy, Aunis, Perche, Île-de-France, Poitou, Maine and Saintonge. Between 1665 and 1673, 900 Filles du Roy, half of them coming from Île-de-France, were sent to Canada to marry farmers and soldiers. In 1760, the colony had a population of 60,000 inhabitants. It is estimated that from 1633 to 1760, an average of 56 Frenchmen emigrated to Canada each year. Between 1608, date of the foundation of Quebec, and 1756, only 10,000 French people emigrated to Canada, most of modern-day French Canadians can trace their roots back to them.

French first settled in Acadia in 1604. In 1667, when the colony went back to France, 441 inhabitants were registered. In 1713, as France ceded the territory to the British Crown, the population had risen to 2,500 Acadians. In 1755, out of a population of 14,000, 7,000 to 8,000 Acadians were deported. Around 1,800 of them fled to Louisiana where their descendants are known as Cajuns.

At the end of the 19th century, French Canadians started to settle in Northeastern and Eastern Ontario, creating the modern-day Franco-Ontarian communities, and in the Prairies. At the same time, immigration from France was encouraged and the country received over 144,000 French immigrants between 1881 and 1980.

==== United States ====
The United States is home to the largest community of people outside of France who have identified as being of French descent. According to the last census of 2011, more than 11.5 million Americans claim French ancestry (French and French Canadian combined), i.e. 4% of the total population. French Americans make up more than 10% of the population in New England, through the emigration from Quebec between 1840 and 1930, and in Louisiana, through the French colonization of the region, the relocalization of deported Acadians and later immigration from Saint-Domingue and from continental France. French is the fourth most spoken language in the United States, after English, Spanish and Mandarin, with over 5 million speakers.

The French American community is made up of several distinct groups, including Huguenot refugees in the Thirteen British Colonies, French settlers in Louisiana, Acadian exiles, French colonists fleeing Saint-Domingue following the Haitian Revolution, and French Canadian immigrants between the 1840s and the 1930s, as well as a steady immigration from continental France since the American Revolution. Around 2 million French people immigrated to the United States, both from France and from the former French colonies in North America.

From 1830 to 1986, 772,000 Frenchmen immigrated to the United States.

Between the 1840s and the 1930s, around 900,000 French Canadians emigrated to the United States, especially in New England. Half of them eventually returned home. Their descendants number 2.1 million people.

=== Europe ===
==== Poland ====
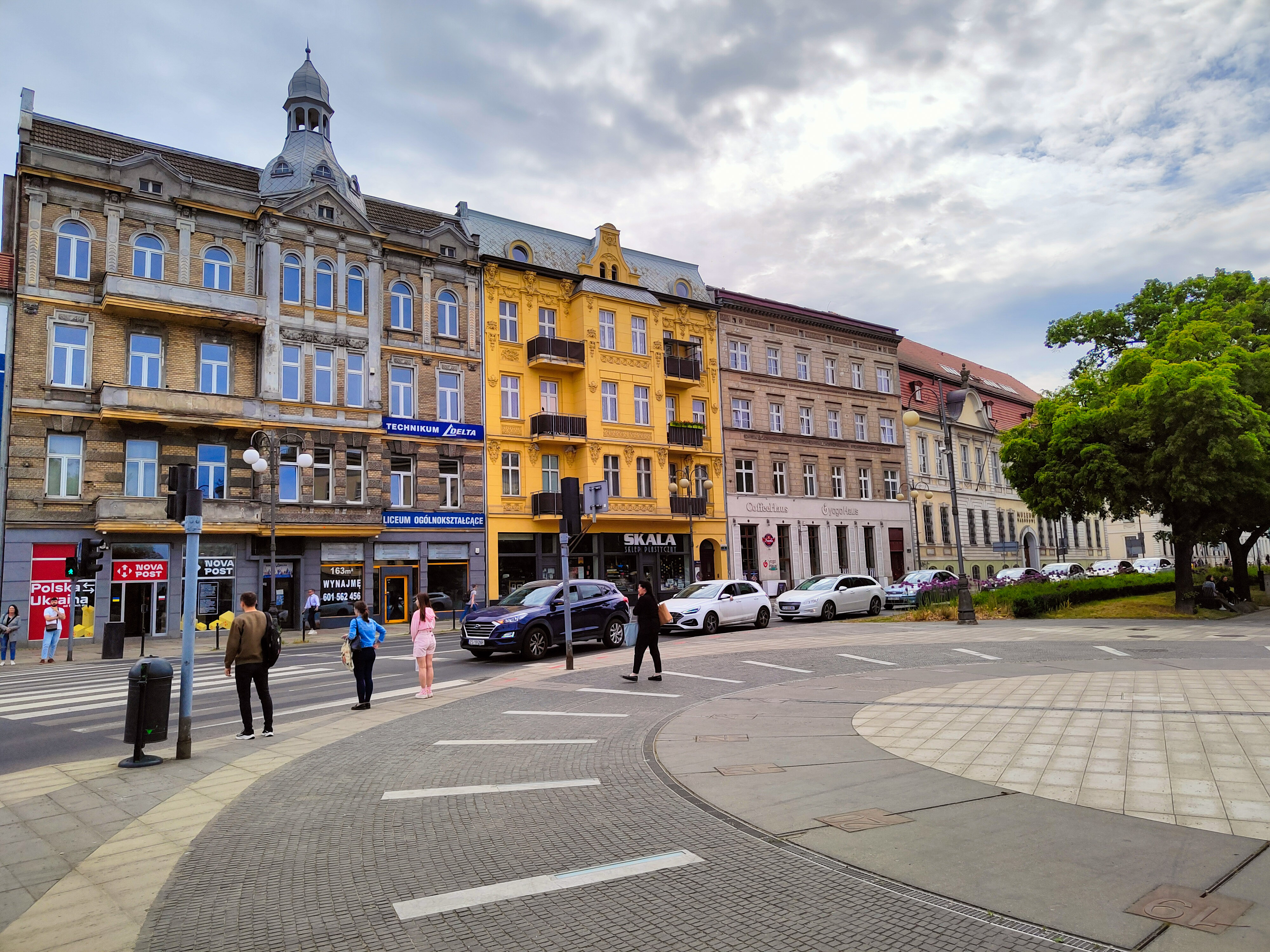
French/Huguenot tenements in Szczecin, built by descendants of French immigrants to the city

Historically, there were three major surges of French migration to Poland, caused by various political factors. The first, consisting of persecuted Huguenots, occurred following the St. Bartholomew's Day massacre of 1572. When French noblewomen Marie Louise Gonzaga and Marie Casimire Louise de la Grange d'Arquien were Queens consorts of Poland in the 17th century, there was a second significant wave of French migration to Poland. The third wave consisted of French monarchists, merchants and craftsmen fleeing the French Revolution. Two Polish cities owed their flourishing in the 19th century to French immigrants, i.e. Sopot to doctor Jean Georg Haffner, who established its first spa, and Żyrardów to inventor and engineer Philippe de Girard, who co-founded its textile industry.

According to the 1921 Polish census, main concentrations of French people included Warsaw (686), Łódź (111), Częstochowa (92), Dąbrowa Górnicza (85) and Lwów (80).

In the 2011 Polish census, 7,999 people declared French nationality, of which 6,754 declared both Polish and French nationality.

== See also ==
- French people
- Assembly of French Citizens Abroad
- French people living outside France
- French legislative constituencies for citizens abroad
- French Argentine
- French Australian
- French Brazilian
- French Canadian
- French Chilean
- French people in Hong Kong
- French people in India
- French Jamaican
- French people in Japan
- French people in Korea
- French Lebanese
- French people in Madagascar
- Franco-Mauritian
- French immigration to Mexico
- French New Zealander
- French people in Pakistan
- French Peruvian
- French Polish
- Huguenots in South Africa
- sv:Fransmän i Sverige (French people in Sweden)
- French migration to the United Kingdom
- French American
- French Uruguayan
