= French people =

French people (French: Les Français, lit. 'The French') are the individuals who are identified with the country of France, or more broadly, a global sociolinguistic group that share a common connection through ancestry, French language, culture, and history that originated in Western Europe. The Francophone world is one of the most geographically widespread linguistic communities.

The French people are primarily descended from Gallo-Romans (Romanized Celts) and Germanic peoples such as the Franks, the Visigoths, the Suebi and the Burgundians who settled in Gaul from east of the Rhine after the fall of the Roman Empire, as well as various later waves of lower-level irregular migration that have continued to the present day. The Norsemen also settled in Normandy in the 10th century and contributed significantly to the ancestry of the Normans. Furthermore, regional ethnic minorities also exist within France that have distinct lineages, languages and cultures such as Bretons in Brittany, Occitans in Occitania, Basques in the French Basque Country, Catalans in northern Catalonia, Germans in Alsace, Corsicans in Corsica and Flemings in French Flanders.

France has long been a patchwork of local customs and regional differences, and while most French people still speak the French language as their mother tongue, languages like Picard, Poitevin-Saintongeais, Franco-Provencal, Occitan, Auvergnat, Corsican, Basque, Lorraine Franconian, Alsatian, Norman, Breton, French Flemish and Catalan remain spoken in their respective regions. Arabic is also widely spoken, arguably the largest minority language in France as of the 21st century (a spot previously held by Breton and Occitan).

Modern French society is a melting pot. From the middle of the 19th century, it experienced a high rate of inward migration, mainly consisting of Italians, Portuguese, Spaniards, Berbers, Arabs, Jews, Sub-Saharan Africans, Chinese, and other peoples from the Middle East and East Asia, and the government, defining France as an inclusive nation with universal values, advocated assimilation through which immigrants were expected to adhere to French values and cultural norms. Nowadays, while the government has let newcomers retain their distinctive cultures since the mid-1980s and requires from them a mere integration, French citizens still equate their nationality with citizenship as does French law.

As of 2025, the total population in France was estimated about 68.6 million. In addition to mainland France, French people and people of French descent can be found internationally, in overseas departments and territories of France such as the French West Indies (French Caribbean), and in foreign countries with significant French-speaking population groups or not, such as the United States (French Americans), Canada (French Canadians), Argentina (French Argentines), Brazil (French Brazilians), Mexico (French Mexicans), Chile (French Chileans) and Uruguay (French Uruguayans).

== Citizenship and legal residence ==
To be French, according to the first article of the French Constitution, is to be a citizen of France, regardless of one's origin, race, or religion (sans distinction d'origine, de race ou de religion). According to its principles, France has devoted itself to the destiny of a proposition nation, a generic territory where people are bounded only by the French language and the assumed willingness to live together, as defined by Ernest Renan's "plébiscite de tous les jours" ('everyday plebiscite') on the willingness to live together, in Renan's 1882 essay "Qu'est-ce qu'une nation?").

The debate concerning the integration of this view with the principles underlying the European Community remains open.

France has been historically open to immigration, although this has changed in recent years. Referring to this perceived openness, Gertrude Stein, wrote: "America is my country but Paris is my home". Indeed, the country has long valued its openness, tolerance and the quality of services available. Application for French citizenship is often interpreted as a renunciation of previous state allegiance unless a dual citizenship agreement exists between the two countries (for instance, this is the case with Switzerland: one can be both French and Swiss). The European treaties have formally permitted movement and European citizens enjoy formal rights to employment in the state sector (though not as trainees in reserved branches, e.g., as magistrates).

Seeing itself as an inclusive nation with universal values, France has always valued and strongly advocated assimilation. However, the success of such assimilation has recently been called into question. There is increasing dissatisfaction with, and within, growing ethno-cultural enclaves (communautarisme). The 2005 French riots in some troubled and impoverished suburbs (les quartiers sensibles) were an example of such tensions. However they should not be interpreted as ethnic conflicts (as appeared before in other countries like the US and the UK) but as social conflicts born out of socioeconomic problems endangering proper integration.

== History ==
Historically, the heritage of the French people is mostly of Celtic or Gallic, Latin (Romans) origin, descending from the ancient and medieval populations of Gauls or Celts from the Atlantic to the Rhone Alps, Germanic tribes that settled France from east of the Rhine and Belgium after the fall of the Roman Empire such as the Franks, Burgundians, Allemanni, Visigoths, and Suebi, Latin and Roman tribes such as Ligurians and Gallo-Romans, Basques, and Norse populations largely settling in Normandy at the beginning of the 10th century as well as "Bretons" (Celtic Britons) settling in Brittany in Western France.

The name "France" etymologically derives from the word Francia, the territory of the Franks. The Franks were a Germanic tribe that overran Roman Gaul at the end of the Roman Empire.

=== Celtic and Roman Gaul ===
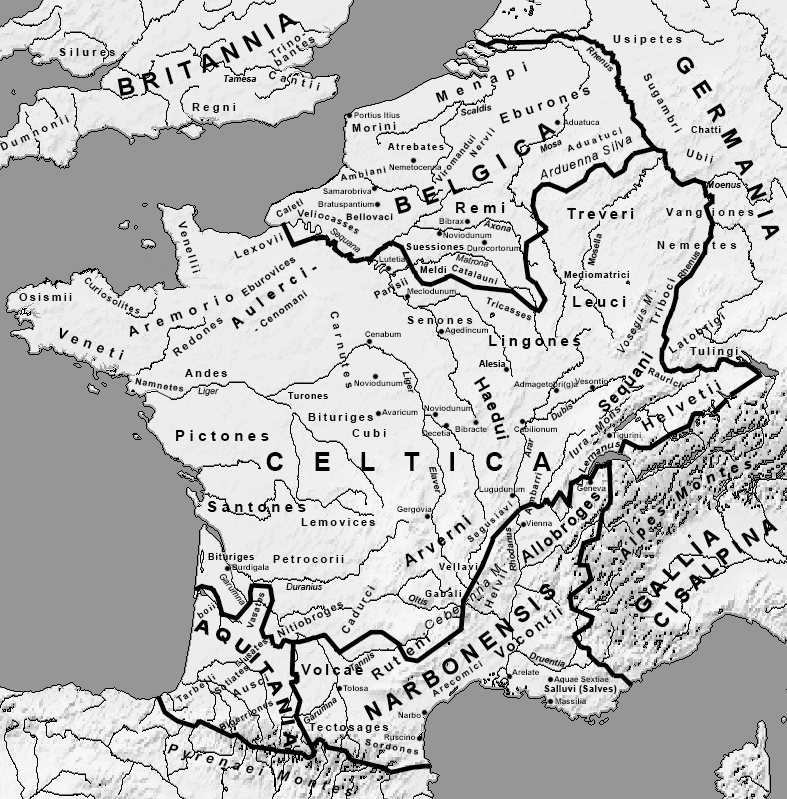
Map of Gaul before complete Roman conquest (c. 58 BCE) and its five main regions: Celtica, Belgica, Cisalpina, Narbonensis and Aquitania.

In the pre-Roman era, Gaul (an area of Western Europe that encompassed all of what is known today as France, Belgium, part of Germany and Switzerland, and Northern Italy) was inhabited by a variety of peoples who were known collectively as the Gaulish tribes. Their ancestors were Celts who came from Central Europe in the 7th century BCE or earlier, and non-Celtic peoples including the Ligures, Aquitanians and Basques in Aquitaine. The Belgae, who lived in the northern and eastern areas, may have had Germanic admixture; many of these peoples had already spoken Gaulish by the time of the Roman conquest.

Gaul was militarily conquered in 58–51 BCE by the Roman legions under the command of General Julius Caesar, except for the south-east which had already been conquered about one century earlier. Over the next six centuries, the two cultures intermingled, creating a hybridized Gallo-Roman culture. In the late Roman era, in addition to colonists from elsewhere in the Empire and Gaulish natives, Gallia also became home to some immigrant populations of Germanic and Scythian origin, such as the Alans.

The Gaulish language is thought to have survived into the 6th century in France, despite considerable Romanization of the local material culture. Coexisting with Latin, Gaulish helped shape the Vulgar Latin dialects that developed into French, with effects including loanwords and calques (including oui, the word for "yes"), sound changes, and influences in conjugation and word order. Today, the last redoubt of Celtic language in France can be found in the northwestern region of Brittany, although this is not the result of a survival of Gaulish language but of a 5th-century AD migration of Brythonic speaking Celts from Britain.

The Vulgar Latin in the region of Gallia took on a distinctly local character, some of which is attested in graffiti, which evolved into the Gallo-Romance dialects which include French and its closest relatives.

=== Frankish Kingdom ===
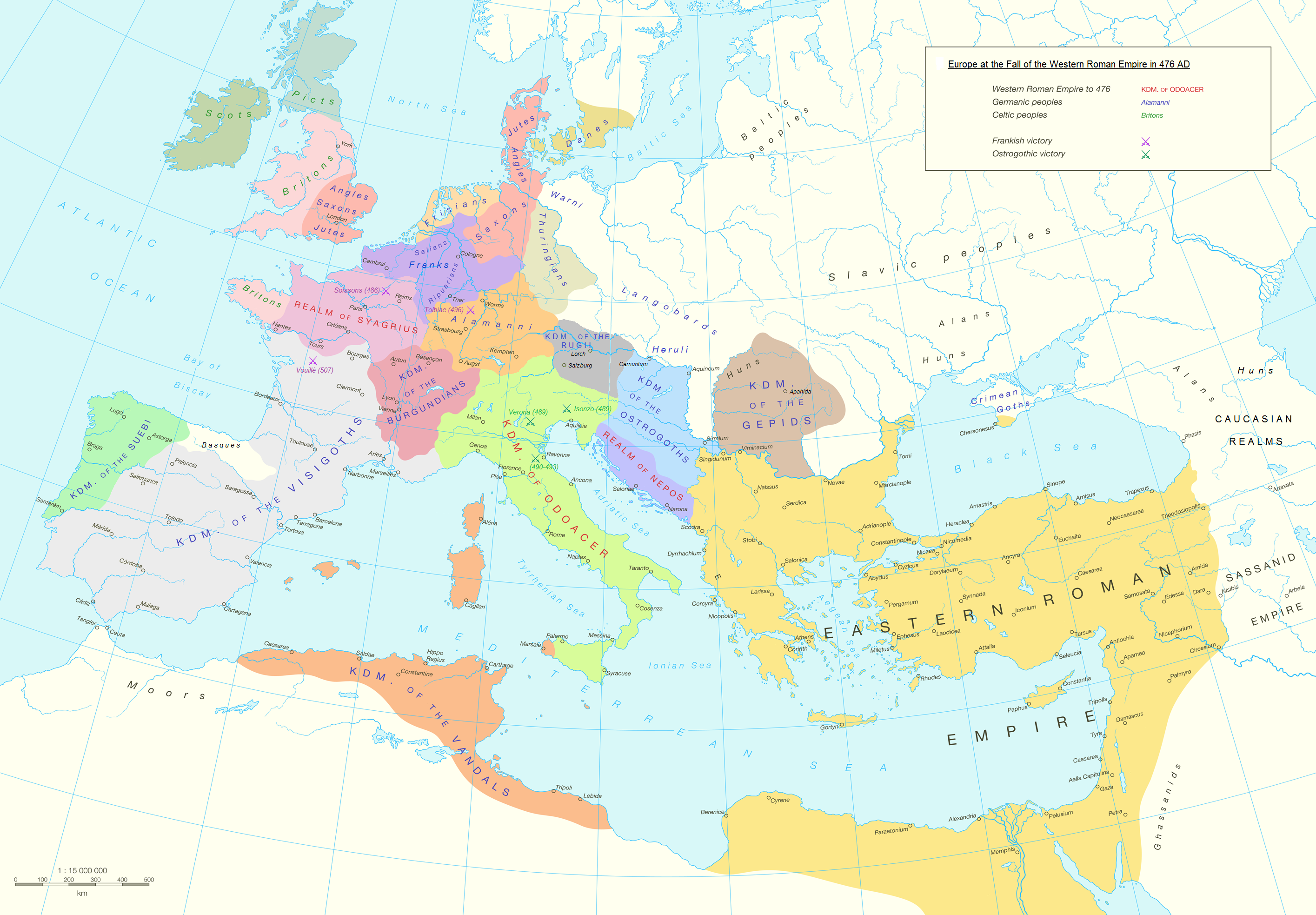
Barbarian kingdoms and peoples after the end of the Western Roman Empire in 476 AD

With the decline of the Roman Empire in Western Europe, a federation of Germanic peoples entered the picture: the Franks, from which the word "French" derives. The Franks were Germanic pagans who began to settle in northern Gaul as laeti during the Roman era. They continued to filter across the Rhine River from present-day Netherlands and Germany between the 3rd and 7th centuries. Initially, they served in the Roman army and obtained important commands. Their language is still spoken as a kind of Dutch (French Flemish) in northern France (French Flanders). The Alamans, another Germanic people immigrated to Alsace, hence the Alemannic German now spoken there. The Alamans were competitors of the Franks, and their name is the origin of the French word for "German": Allemand.

By the early 6th century, the Franks, led by the Merovingian king Clovis I and his sons, had consolidated their hold on much of modern-day France. The other major Germanic people to arrive in France, after the Burgundians and the Visigoths, were the Norsemen or Northmen. Known by the shortened name "Norman" in France, these were Viking raiders from modern Denmark and Norway. They settled with Anglo-Scandinavians and Anglo-Saxons from the Danelaw in the region known today as Normandy in the 9th and 10th centuries. This later became a fiefdom of the Kingdom of France under King Charles III. The Vikings eventually intermarried with the local people, converting to Christianity in the process. The Normans, two centuries later, went on to conquer England and Southern Italy.

Eventually, though, the largely autonomous Duchy of Normandy was incorporated back into the royal domain (i. e. the territory under direct control of the French king) in the Middle Ages. In the crusader Kingdom of Jerusalem, founded in 1099, at most 120,000 Franks, who were predominantly French-speaking Western Christians, ruled over 350,000 Muslims, Jews, and native Eastern Christians.

=== Kingdom of France ===
Louis XIV "The Sun-King"

Unlike elsewhere in Europe, France experienced relatively low levels of emigration to the Americas, with the exception of the Huguenots, due to a lower birthrate than in the rest of Europe. However, significant emigration of mainly Roman Catholic French populations led to the settlement of the Province of Acadia, Canada (New France) and Louisiana, all (at the time) French possessions, as well as colonies in the West Indies, Mascarene islands and Africa.

On 30 December 1687, a community of French Huguenots settled in South Africa. Most of these originally settled in the Cape Colony, but have since been quickly absorbed into the Afrikaner population. After Champlain's founding of Quebec City in 1608, it became the capital of New France. Encouraging settlement was difficult, and while some immigration did occur, by 1763 New France only had a population of some 65,000. From 1713 to 1787, 30,000 colonists immigrated from France to the Saint-Domingue. In 1805, when the French were forced out of Saint-Domingue (Haiti), 35,000 French settlers were given lands in Cuba.

By the beginning of the 17th century, some 20% of the total male population of Catalonia was made up of French immigrants. In the 18th century and early 19th century, a small migration of French emigrated by official invitation of the Habsburgs to the Austro-Hungarian Empire, now the nations of Austria, Czech Republic, Hungary, Slovakia, Serbia, and Romania. Some of them, coming from French-speaking communes in Lorraine or being French Swiss Walsers from the Valais canton in Switzerland, maintained for some generations the French language and a specific ethnic identity, later labelled as Banat (French: Français du Banat). By 1788, there were eight villages populated by French colonists.

=== French Republic ===
Liberty Leading the People by Eugène Delacroix

The French First Republic appeared following the 1789 French Revolution. It replaced the ancient kingdom of France, ruled by the divine right of kings.

The 1870 Franco-Prussian War, which led to the short-lived Paris Commune of 1871, was instrumental in bolstering patriotic feelings; until World War I (1914–1918), French politicians never completely lost sight of the disputed Alsace-Lorraine region which played a major role in the definition of the French nation and therefore of the French people.

The decrees of 24 October 1870 by Adolphe Crémieux granted automatic and massive French citizenship to all Jewish people of Algeria.

=== 20th century ===
Successive waves of immigrants during the 19th and 20th centuries were rapidly assimilated into French culture. France's population dynamics began to change in the middle of the 19th century, as France joined the Industrial Revolution. The pace of industrial growth attracted millions of European immigrants over the next century, with especially large numbers arriving from Poland, Belgium, Portugal, Italy, and Spain.

In the period from 1915 to 1950, many immigrants came from Czechoslovakia, Hungary, Russia, Scandinavia and Yugoslavia. Small but significant numbers of Frenchmen in the North and Northeast regions have relatives in Germany and Great Britain.

Between 1956 and 1967, about 235,000 North African Jews from Algeria, Tunisia, and Morocco also immigrated to France due to the decline of the French empire and following the Six-Day War. Hence, by 1968, Jews of North African origin comprised the majority of the Jewish population of France. As these new immigrants were already culturally French they needed little time to adjust to French society.

French law made it easy for thousands of settlers (colons in French), national French from former colonies of North and East Africa, India and Indochina to live in mainland France. It is estimated that 20,000 settlers were living in Saigon in 1945, and there were 68,430 European settlers living in Madagascar in 1958. 1.6 million European pieds noirs settlers migrated from Algeria, Tunisia and Morocco. In just a few months in 1962, 900,000 pied noir settlers left Algeria in the most massive relocation of population in Europe since the World War II. In the 1970s, over 30,000 French settlers left Cambodia during the Khmer Rouge regime as the Pol Pot government confiscated their farms and land properties.

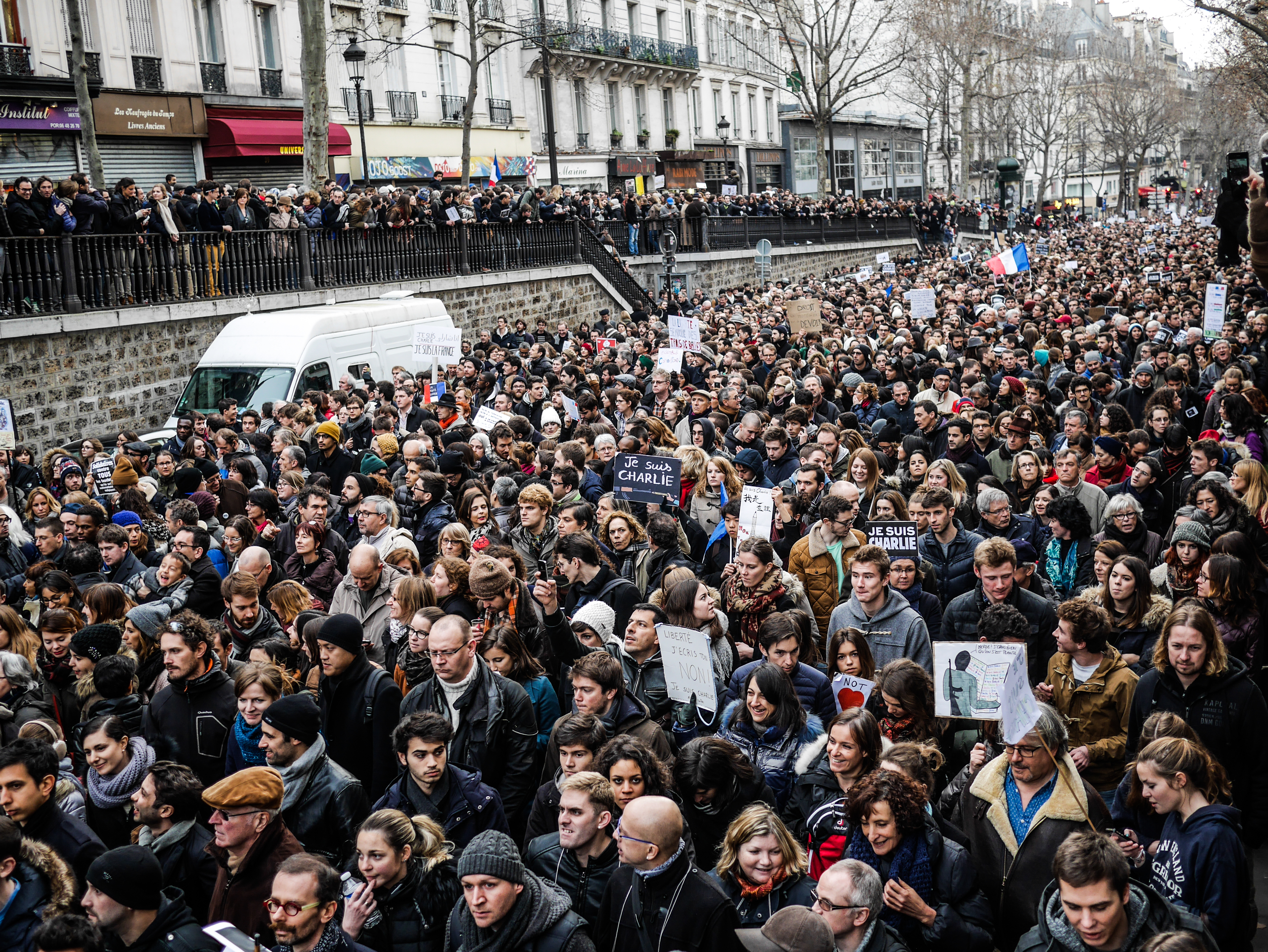
A rally in Paris in support of the victims of the 2015 Charlie Hebdo shooting

In the 1960s, a second wave of immigration came to France, which was needed for reconstruction purposes and for cheaper labour after the devastation brought on by World War II. French entrepreneurs went to Maghreb countries looking for cheap labour, thus encouraging work-immigration to France. Their settlement was officialized with Jacques Chirac's family regrouping act of 1976 (regroupement familial). Since then, immigration has become more varied, although France stopped being a major immigration country compared to other European countries. The large impact of North African and Arab immigration is the greatest and has brought racial, socio-cultural and religious questions to a country seen as homogenously European, French and Christian for thousands of years. Nevertherless, according to Justin Vaïsse, professor at Sciences Po Paris, integration of Muslim immigrants is happening as part of a background evolution and recent studies confirmed the results of their assimilation, showing that "North Africans seem to be characterized by a high degree of cultural integration reflected in a relatively high propensity to exogamy" with rates ranging from 20% to 50%. According to Emmanuel Todd the relatively high exogamy among French Algerians can be explained by the colonial link between France and Algeria.

A small French descent group also subsequently arrived from Latin America (Argentina, Chile and Uruguay) in the 1970s.

== Languages ==
=== In France ===
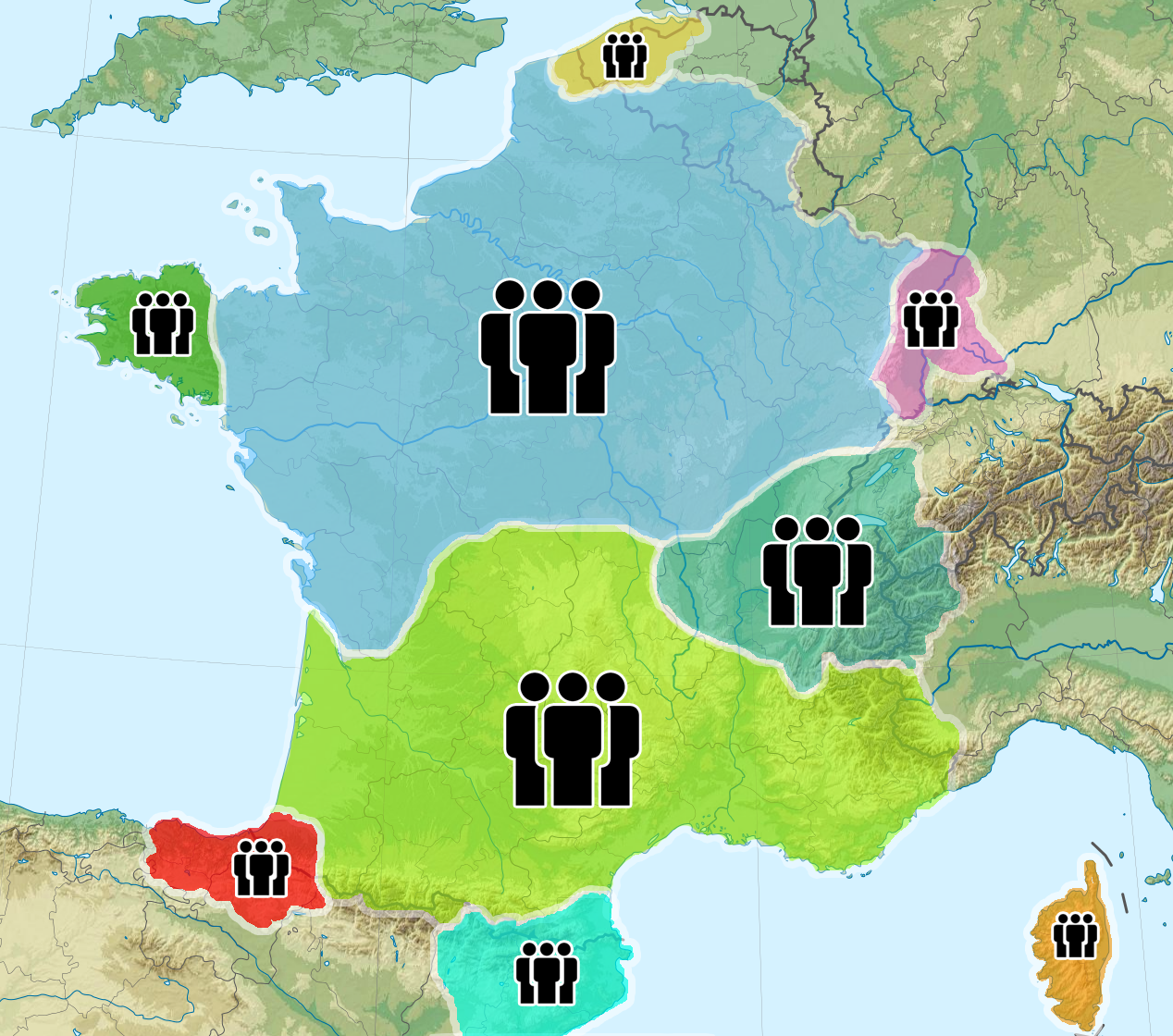
A map showing the (historical) linguistic groups in Metropolitan France: Alsatians (German speakers) Arpitan speakers Basques Bretons Catalans Corsicans Dutch speakers Occitan speakers Langues d'oïl speakers

Most French people speak the French language as their mother tongue, but certain languages like Norman, Occitan languages, Corsican, Euskara, French Flemish and Breton remain spoken in certain regions (see Language policy in France). There have also been periods of history when a majority of French people had other first languages (local languages such as Occitan, Catalan, Alsatian, West Flemish, Lorraine Franconian, Gallo, Picard or Ch'timi and Arpitan). Today, many immigrants speak another tongue at home.

According to historian Eric Hobsbawm, "the French language has been essential to the concept of 'France'," although in 1789, 50 percent of the French people did not speak it at all, and only 12 to 13 percent spoke it fairly well; even in oïl languages zones, it was not usually used except in cities, and even there not always in the outlying districts.

== Nationality, citizenship, ethnicity ==
Generations of settlers have migrated over the centuries to France, creating a variegated grouping of peoples. Thus the historian John F. Drinkwater states, "The French are, paradoxically, strongly conscious of belonging to a single nation, but they hardly constitute a unified ethnic group by any scientific gauge."

The modern French are the descendants of mixtures including Romans, Celts, Iberians, Ligurians and Greeks in southern France, Germanic peoples arriving at the end of the Roman Empire such as the Franks and the Burgundians, and some Vikings who mixed with the Normans and settled mostly in Normandy in the 9th century.

According to Dominique Schnapper, "The classical conception of the nation is that of an entity which, opposed to the ethnic group, affirms itself as an open community, the will to live together expressing itself by the acceptation of the rules of a unified public domain which transcends all particularisms".

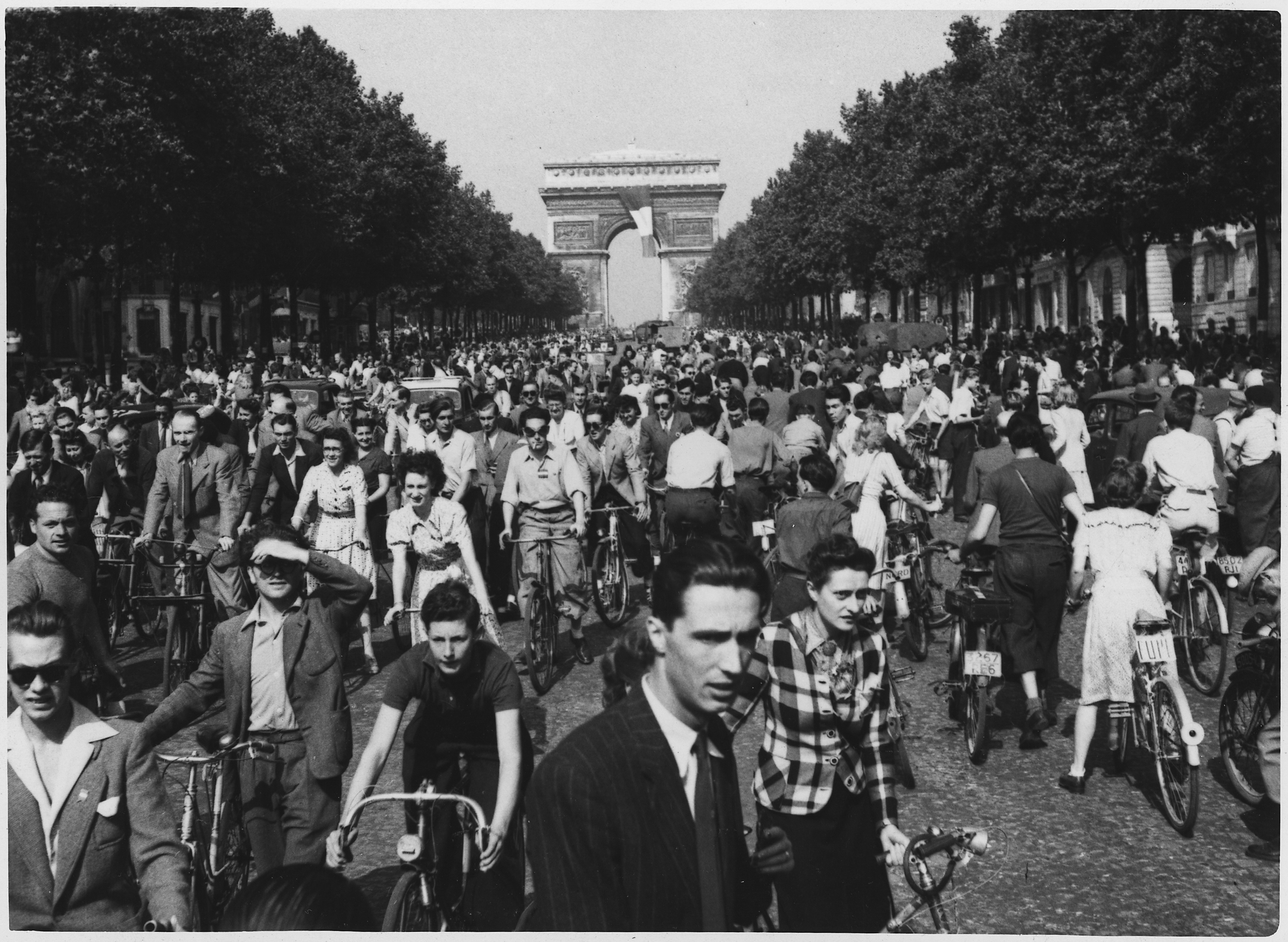
French people in Paris, August 1944

The conventional conception of French history starts with Ancient Gaul, and French national identity often views the Gauls as national precursors, either as biological ancestors (hence the refrain nos ancêtres les Gaulois), as emotional/spiritual ancestors, or both. Vercingetorix, the Gaulish chieftain who tried to unite the various Gallic tribes of the land against Roman encroachment but was ultimately vanquished by Julius Caesar, is often revered as a "first national hero". In the famously popular French comic Asterix, the main characters are patriotic Gauls who fight against Roman invaders while in modern days the term Gaulois is used in French to distinguish the "native" French from French of immigrant origins. However, despite its occasional nativist usage, the Gaulish identity has also been embraced by French of non-native origins as well: notably, Napoleon III, whose family was ultimately of Corsican and Italian roots, identified France with Gaul and Vercingetorix, and declared that "New France, ancient France, Gaul are one and the same moral person."

It has been noted that the French view of having Gallic origins has evolved over history. Before the French Revolution, it divided social classes, with the peasants identifying with the native Gauls while the aristocracy identified with the Franks. During the early nineteenth century, intellectuals began using the identification with Gaul instead as a unifying force to bridge divisions within French society with a common national origin myth. Myriam Krepps of the University of Nebraska-Omaha argues that the view of "a unified territory (one land since the beginning of civilization) and a unified people" which de-emphasized "all disparities and the succession of waves of invaders" was first imprinted on the masses by the unified history curriculum of French textbooks in the late 1870s.

Since the beginning of the Third Republic (1871–1940), the state has not categorized people according to their alleged ethnic origins. Hence, in contrast to the United States Census, French people are not asked to define their ethnic appartenance, whichever it may be. The usage of ethnic and racial categorization is avoided to prevent any case of discrimination; the same regulations apply to religious membership data that cannot be compiled under the French Census. This classic French republican non-essentialist conception of nationality is officialized by the French Constitution, according to which "French" is a nationality, and not a specific ethnicity.

=== Genetics ===
France sits at the edge of the European peninsula and has seen waves of migration of groups that often settled owing to the presence of physical barriers preventing onward migration. This has led to language and regional cultural variegation, but the extent to which this pattern of migrations showed up in population genetics studies was unclear until the publication of a study in 2019 that used genome wide data. The study identified six different genetic clusters that could be distinguished across populations. The study concluded that the population genetic clusters correlate with linguistic and historical divisions in France and with the presence of geographic barriers such as mountains and major rivers. A population bottleneck was also identified in the fourteenth century, consistent with the timing for the Black Death in Europe.

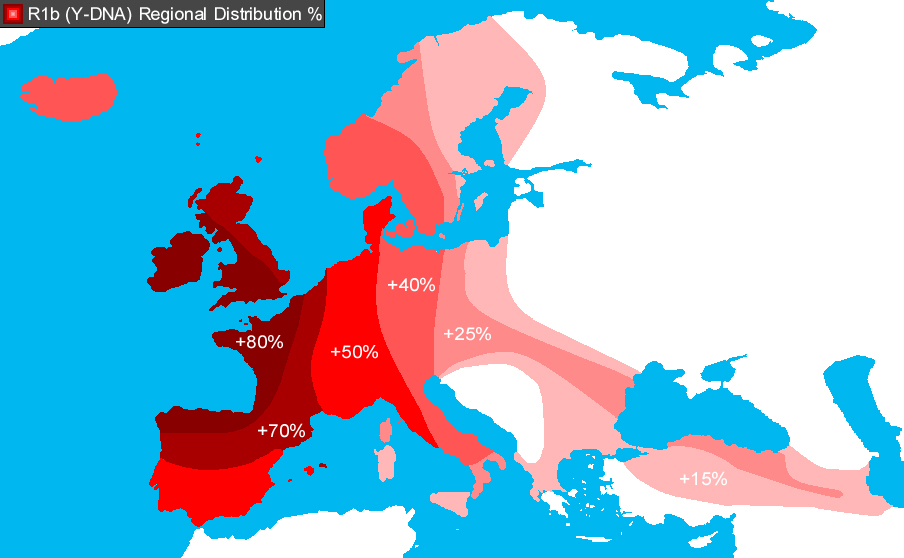
R1b-DNA-Distribution

Modern French people predominantly present the R1b haplogroup of the Y chromosome, transmitted patrilineally and associated with steppe descent

=== Nationality and citizenship ===
French nationality has not meant automatic citizenship. Some categories of French people have been excluded, throughout the years, from full citizenship:

- Women: until the Liberation, they were deprived of the right to vote. The provisional government of General de Gaulle accorded them this right by 21 April 1944 prescription. However, women are still under-represented in the political class. The 6 June 2000 law on parity attempted to address this question by imposing a de facto quota system for women in French politics.
- Military: for a long time, it was called "la grande muette" ("the great mute") in reference to its prohibition from interfering in political life. During a large part of the Third Republic (1871–1940), the Army was in its majority anti-republican (and thus counterrevolutionary). The Dreyfus Affair and the 16 May 1877 crisis, which almost led to a monarchist coup d'état by MacMahon, are examples of this anti-republican spirit. Therefore, they would only gain the right to vote with the 17 August 1945 prescription: the contribution of De Gaulle to the interior French Resistance reconciled the Army with the Republic. Nevertheless, militaries do not benefit from the whole of public liberties, as the 13 July 1972 law on the general statute of militaries specify.
- Young people: the July 1974 law, voted at the instigation of president Valéry Giscard d'Estaing, reduced from 21 to 18 the age of majority.
- Naturalized foreigners: since the 9 January 1973 law, foreigners who have acquired French nationality do not have to wait five years after their naturalization to be able to vote anymore.
- Inhabitants of the colonies: the 7 May 1946 law meant that soldiers from the "Empire" (such as the tirailleurs) killed during World War I and World War II were not citizens.
- The special case of foreign citizens of an EU member state who, even if not French, are allowed to vote in European and French local elections if living in France, and may turn to any French consular or diplomatic mission if there is no such representations of their own country.
- Some French people convicted by a court may be deprived of their civil rights, up to 10 years.

France was one of the first countries to implement denaturalization laws. Philosopher Giorgio Agamben has pointed out this fact that the 1915 French law which permitted denaturalization with regard to naturalized citizens of "enemy" origins was one of the first example of such legislation, which Nazi Germany later implemented with the 1935 Nuremberg Laws.

Furthermore, some authors who have insisted on the "crisis of the nation-state" allege that nationality and citizenship are becoming separate concepts. They show as example "international", "supranational citizenship" or "world citizenship" (membership to international nongovernmental organizations such as Amnesty International or Greenpeace). This would indicate a path toward a "postnational citizenship".

Besides this, modern citizenship is linked to civic participation (also called positive freedom), which implies voting, demonstrations, petitions, activism, etc. Therefore, social exclusion may lead to deprivation of citizenship. This has led various authors (Philippe Van Parijs, Jean-Marc Ferry, Alain Caillé, André Gorz) to theorize a guaranteed minimum income which would impede exclusion from citizenship.

=== Multiculturalism versus universalism ===
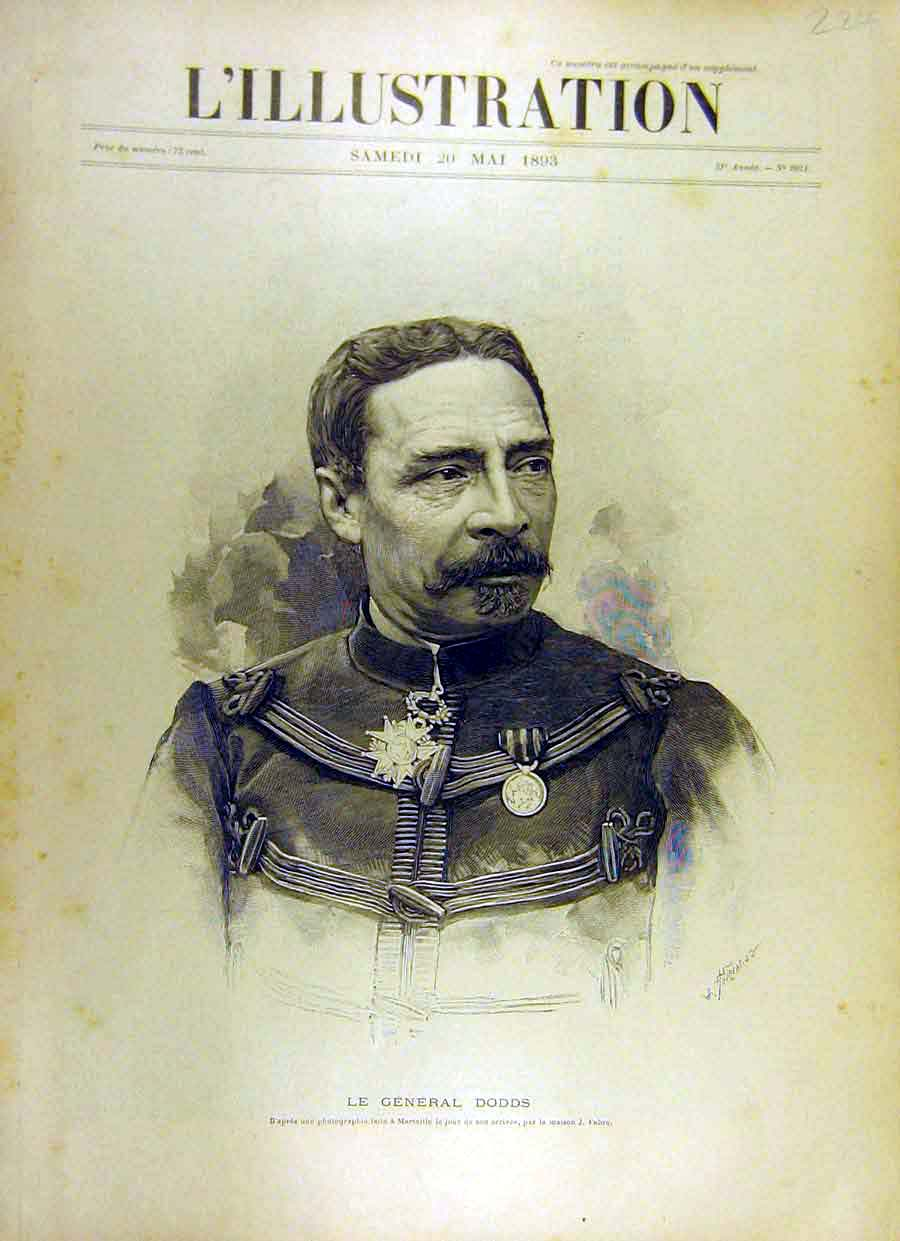
Alfred-Amédée Dodds, a mixed-race French general and colonial administrator born in Senegal

In France, the conception of citizenship teeters between universalism and multiculturalism. French citizenship has been defined for a long time by three factors: integration, individual adherence, and the primacy of the soil (jus soli). Political integration (which includes but is not limited to racial integration) is based on voluntary policies which aims at creating a common identity and the interiorization by each individual of a common cultural and historic legacy. Since in France, the state preceded the nation, voluntary policies have taken an important place in the creation of this common cultural identity.

On the other hand, the interiorization of a common legacy is a slow process, which B. Villalba compares to acculturation. According to him, "integration is therefore the result of a double will: the nation's will to create a common culture for all members of the nation, and the communities' will living in the nation to recognize the legitimacy of this common culture". Villalba warns against confusing recent processes of integration (related to the so-called "second generation immigrants", who are subject to discrimination), with older processes which have made modern France. Villalba thus shows that any democratic nation characterize itself by its project of transcending all forms of particular memberships (whether biological, ethnic, historic, economic, social, religious or cultural). The citizen thus emancipates himself from the particularisms of identity which characterize himself to attain a more "universal" dimension. He is a citizen, before being a member of a community or of a social class.

Therefore, according to Villalba, "a democratic nation is, by definition, multicultural as it gathers various populations, which differs by their regional origins (Auvergnats, Bretons, Corsicans or Lorrainers...), their national origins (immigrant, son or grandson of an immigrant), or religious origins (Catholics, Protestants, Jews, Muslims, Agnostics or Atheists...)."

=== Ernest Renan's What is a Nation? (1882) ===
Ernest Renan described this republican conception in his famous 11 March 1882 conference at the Sorbonne, Qu'est-ce qu'une nation? ("What is a Nation?"). According to him, to belong to a nation is a subjective act which always has to be repeated, as it is not assured by objective criteria. A nation-state is not composed of a single homogeneous ethnic group (a community), but of a variety of individuals willing to live together.

Renan's non-essentialist definition, which forms the basis of the French Republic, is diametrically opposed to the German ethnic conception of a nation, first formulated by Fichte. The German conception is usually qualified in France as an "exclusive" view of nationality, as it includes only the members of the corresponding ethnic group, while the Republican conception thinks itself as universalist, following the Enlightenment's ideals officialized by the 1789 Declaration of the Rights of Man and of the Citizen. While Ernest Renan's arguments were also concerned by the debate about the disputed Alsace-Lorraine region, he said that not only one referendum had to be made in order to ask the opinions of the Alsatian people, but also a "daily referendum" should be made concerning all those citizens wanting to live in the French nation-state. This plébiscite de tous les jours ('everyday plebiscite') might be compared to a social contract or even to the classic definition of consciousness as an act which repeats itself endlessly.

Henceforth, contrary to the German definition of a nation based on objective criteria, such as race or ethnic group, which may be defined by the existence of a common language, among other criteria, the people of France is defined as all the people living in the French nation-state and willing to do so, i.e. by its citizenship. This definition of the French nation-state contradicts the common opinion, which holds that the concept of the French people identifies with one particular ethnic group. This contradiction explains the seeming paradox encountered when attempting to identify a "French ethnic group": the French conception of the nation is radically opposed to (and was thought in opposition to) the German conception of the Volk ("ethnic group").

This universalist conception of citizenship and of the nation has influenced the French model of colonization. While the British Empire preferred an indirect rule system, which did not mix the colonized people with the colonists, the French Republic theoretically chose an integration system and considered parts of its colonial empire as France itself and its population as French people. The ruthless conquest of Algeria thus led to the integration of the territory as a Département of the French territory.

This ideal also led to the ironic sentence which opened up history textbooks in France as in its colonies: "Our ancestors the Gauls...". However, this universal ideal, rooted in the 1789 French Revolution ("bringing liberty to the people"), suffered from the racism that impregnated colonialism. Thus, in Algeria, the Crémieux decrees at the end of the 19th century gave French citizenship to north African Jews, while Muslims were regulated by the 1881 Indigenous Code. Liberal author Tocqueville himself considered that the British model was better adapted than the French one and did not balk before the cruelties of General Bugeaud's conquest. He went as far as advocating racial segregation there.

This paradoxical tension between the universalist conception of the French nation and the racist attitudes intermingled into colonization is most obvious in Ernest Renan himself, who went as far as advocating a kind of eugenics. In a 26 June 1856 letter to Arthur de Gobineau, author of An Essay on the Inequality of the Human Races (1853–1855) and one of the first theoreticians of "scientific racism", he wrote:

You have written a remarkable book here, full of vigour and originality of mind, only it's written to be little understood in France or rather it's written to be misunderstood here. The French mind turns little to ethnographic considerations: France has little belief in race, [...] The fact of race is huge originally; but it's been continually losing its importance, and sometimes, as in France, it happens to disappear completely. Does that mean total decadence? Yes, certainly from the standpoint of the stability of institutions, the originality of character, a certain nobility that I hold to be the most important factor in the conjunction of human affairs. But also what compensations! No doubt if the noble elements mixed in the blood of a people happened to disappear completely, then there would be a demeaning equality, like that of some Eastern states and in some respects China. But it is in fact a very small amount of noble blood put into the circulation of a people that is enough to ennoble them, at least as to historical effects; this is how France, a nation so completely fallen into commonness, in practice plays on the world stage the role of a gentleman. Setting aside the quite inferior races whose intermingling with the great races would only poison the human species, I see in the future a homogeneous humanity.

=== Jus soli and jus sanguinis ===
During the Ancien Régime (before the 1789 French revolution), jus soli (or "right of territory") was predominant. Feudal law recognized personal allegiance to the sovereign, but the subjects of the sovereign were defined by their birthland. According to the 3 September 1791 Constitution, those who are born in France from a foreign father and have fixed their residency in France, or those who, after being born in a foreign country from a French father, have come to France and have sworn their civil oath, become French citizens. Because of the war, distrust toward foreigners led to the obligation on the part of this last category to swear a civil oath in order to gain French nationality.

However, the Napoleonic Code would insist on jus sanguinis ("right of blood"). Paternity, against Napoléon Bonaparte's wish, became the principal criterion of nationality, and therefore broke for the first time with the ancient tradition of jus soli, by breaking any residency condition toward children born abroad from French parents. However, according to Patrick Weil, it was not "ethnically motivated" but "only meant that family links transmitted by the pater familias had become more important than subjecthood".

With the 7 February 1851 law, voted during the Second Republic (1848–1852), "double jus soli" was introduced in French legislation, combining birth origin with paternity. Thus, it gave French nationality to the child of a foreigner, if both are born in France, except if the year following his coming of age he reclaims a foreign nationality (thus prohibiting dual nationality). This 1851 law was in part passed because of conscription concerns. This system more or less remained the same until the 1993 reform of the Nationality Code, created by 9 January 1973 law.

The 1993 reform, which defines the Nationality law, is deemed controversial by some. It commits young people born in France to foreign parents to solicit French nationality between the ages of 16 and 21. This has been criticized, some arguing that the principle of equality before the law was not complied with, since French nationality was no longer given automatically at birth, as in the classic "double jus soli" law, but was to be requested when approaching adulthood. Henceforth, children born in France from French parents were differentiated from children born in France from foreign parents, creating a hiatus between these two categories.

The 1993 reform was prepared by the Pasqua laws. The first Pasqua law, in 1986, restricts residence conditions in France and facilitates expulsions. With this 1986 law, a child born in France from foreign parents can only acquire French nationality by demonstrating a will to do so, at age 16, by proving haven been schooled in France and has a sufficient command of the French language. This new policy is symbolized by the expulsion of 101 Malians by charter.

The second Pasqua law on "immigration control" makes regularisation of illegal aliens more difficult and, in general, residence conditions for foreigners much harder. Charles Pasqua, who said on 11 May 1987: "Some have reproached me of having used a plane, but, if necessary, I will use trains", declared to Le Monde on 2 June 1993: "France has been a country of immigration, it doesn't want to be one anymore. Our aim, taking into account the difficulties of the economic situation, is to tend toward 'zero immigration' ("immigration zéro")".

Therefore, modern French nationality law combines four factors: paternality or 'right of blood', birth origin, residency and the will expressed by a foreigner, or a person born in France to foreign parents, to become French.

=== European citizenship ===
The 1992 Maastricht Treaty introduced the concept of European citizenship, which comes in addition to national citizenships.

=== Citizenship of foreigners ===
By definition, a "foreigner" is someone who does not have French nationality. Therefore, it is not a synonym of "immigrant", as a foreigner may be born in France. On the other hand, a Frenchman born abroad may be considered an immigrant (e.g. former prime minister Dominique de Villepin who lived the majority of his life abroad). In most of the cases, however, a foreigner is an immigrant, and vice versa. They either benefit from legal sojourn in France, which, after a residency of ten years, makes it possible to ask for naturalisation. If they do not, they are considered "illegal aliens". Some argue that this privation of nationality and citizenship does not square with their contribution to the national economic efforts, and thus to economic growth.

In any cases, rights of foreigners in France have improved over the last half-century:

- 1946: right to elect trade union representative (but not to be elected as a representative)
- 1968: right to become a trade-union delegate
- 1972: right to sit in works council and to be a delegate of the workers at the condition of "knowing how to read and write French"
- 1975: additional condition: "to be able to express oneself in French"; they may vote at prud'hommes elections ("industrial tribunal elections") but may not be elected; foreigners may also have administrative or leadership positions in tradeunions but under various conditions
- 1982: those conditions are suppressed, only the function of conseiller prud'hommal is reserved to those who have acquired French nationality. They may be elected in workers' representation functions (Auroux laws). They also may become administrators in public structures such as Social security banks (caisses de sécurité sociale), OPAC (which administers HLMs), Ophlm...
- 1992: for European Union citizens, right to vote at the European elections, first exercised during the 1994 European elections, and at municipal elections (first exercised during the 2001 municipal elections).

=== Statistics ===
The INSEE does not collect data about language, religion, or ethnicity – on the principle of the secular and unitary nature of the French Republic.

Nevertheless, there are some sources dealing with just such distinctions:

- The CIA World Factbook defines the ethnic groups of France as being "Celtic and Latin with Teutonic, Slavic, North African, Sub-Saharan African, Indochinese, and Basque minorities. Overseas departments: black, white, mulatto, East Indian, Chinese, Amerindian". Its definition is reproduced on several Web sites collecting or reporting demographic data.
- The U.S. Department of State goes into further detail: "Since prehistoric times, France has been a crossroads of trade, travel, and invasion. Three basic European ethnic stocks – Celtic, Latin, and Teutonic (Frankish) – have blended over the centuries to make up its present population. . . . Traditionally, France has had a high level of immigration. . . . In 2004, there were over 6 million Muslims, largely of North African descent, living in France. France is home to both the largest Muslim and Jewish populations in Europe."
- The Encyclopædia Britannica says that "the French are strongly conscious of belonging to a single nation, but they hardly constitute a unified ethnic group by any scientific gauge", and it mentions as part of the population of France the Basques, the Celts (called Gauls by Romans), and the Germanic (Teutonic) peoples (including the Norsemen or Vikings). France also became "in the 19th and especially in the 20th century, the prime recipient of foreign immigration into Europe. . . ."

It is said by some that France adheres to the ideal of a single, homogeneous national culture, supported by the absence of hyphenated identities and by avoidance of the very term "ethnicity" in French discourse.

=== Immigration ===
As of 2008, the French national institute of statistics INSEE estimated that 5.3 million foreign-born immigrants and 6.5 million direct descendants of immigrants (born in France with at least one immigrant parent) lived in France representing a total of 11.8 million and 19% of the total population in metropolitan France (62.1 million in 2008). Among them, about 5.5 million are of European origin and 4 million of North African origin.

== Populations with French ancestry ==
French Diaspora in Worldwide

Between 1848 and 1939, 1 million people with French passports emigrated to other countries. The main communities of French ancestry in the New World are found in the United States, Canada and Argentina while sizeable groups are also found in Brazil, Chile, Uruguay and Australia.

=== Canada ===
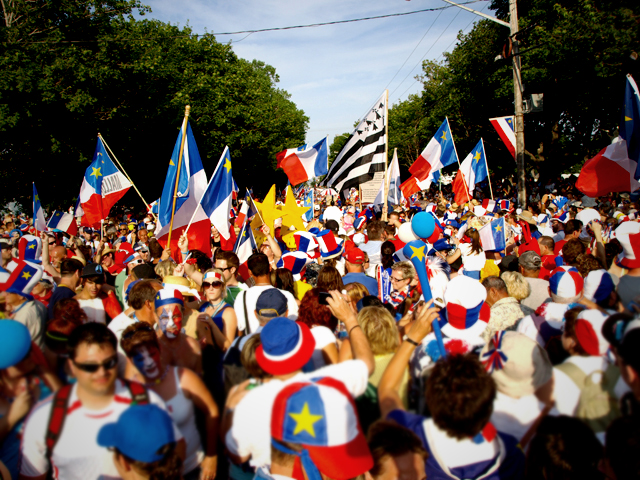
Acadians celebrating the Tintamarre and National Acadian Day in Caraquet, New Brunswick

There are nearly seven million French speakers out of nine to ten million people of French and partial French ancestry in Canada. The Canadian province of Quebec (2006 census population of 7,546,131), where more than 95 percent of the people speak French as either their first, second or even third language, is the center of French life on the Western side of the Atlantic; however, French settlement began further east, in Acadia. Quebec is home to vibrant French-language arts, media, and learning. There are sizable French-Canadian communities scattered throughout the other provinces of Canada, particularly in Ontario, which has about 1 million people with French ancestry (400 000 who have French as their mother tongue), Manitoba, and New Brunswick, which is the only fully bilingual province and is 33 percent Acadian.

=== United States ===
The United States is home to an estimated 13 to 16 million people of French descent, or 4 to 5 percent of the US population, particularly in Louisiana, New England, Northern New York, and parts of the Midwest. The French community in Louisiana consists of the Creoles, the descendants of the French settlers who arrived when Louisiana was a French colony, and the Cajuns, the descendants of Acadian refugees from the Great Upheaval. Very few creoles remain in New Orleans in present times. In New England, the vast majority of French immigration in the 19th and early 20th centuries came not from France, but from over the border in Quebec, the Quebec diaspora. These French Canadians arrived to work in the timber mills and textile plants that appeared throughout the region as it industrialized. Today, nearly 25 percent of the population of New Hampshire is of French ancestry, the highest of any state.

English and Dutch colonies of pre-Revolutionary America attracted large numbers of French Huguenots fleeing religious persecution in France. In the Dutch colony of New Netherland that later became New York, northern New Jersey, and western Connecticut, these French Huguenots, nearly identical in religion to the Dutch Reformed Church, assimilated almost completely into the Dutch community. However, large it may have been at one time, it has lost all identity of its French origin, often with the translation of names (examples: de la Montagne > Vandenberg by translation; de Vaux > DeVos or Devoe by phonetic respelling). Huguenots appeared in all of the English colonies and likewise assimilated. Even though this mass settlement approached the size of the settlement of the French settlement of Quebec, it has assimilated into the English-speaking mainstream to a much greater extent than other French colonial groups and has left few traces of cultural influence. New Rochelle, New York is named after La Rochelle, France, one of the sources of Huguenot emigration to the Dutch colony; and New Paltz, New York, is one of the few non-urban settlements of Huguenots that did not undergo massive recycling of buildings in the usual redevelopment of such older, larger cities as New York City or New Rochelle.

=== Argentina ===
French Argentines form the third largest ancestry group in Argentina, after Italian and Spanish Argentines. French immigration to Argentina peaked between 1871 and 1890, though considerable immigration continued until the late 1940s. At least half of these immigrants came from Southwestern France, especially from the Basque Country, Béarn (Basses-Pyrénées accounted for more than 20% of immigrants), Bigorre and Rouergue, but significant numbers also from Savoy and the Paris region. Today around 6.8 million Argentines have some degree of French ancestry or are of partial or wholly of French descent (up to 17% of the total population). French Argentines had a considerable influence over the country, particularly on its architectural styles and literary traditions, as well as on the scientific field. Some notable Argentines of French descent include writer Julio Cortázar, physiologist and Nobel Prize winner Bernardo Houssay or activist Alicia Moreau de Justo. With something akin to Hispanic culture, the French immigrants quickly assimilated into mainstream Argentine society.

=== Uruguay ===
French Uruguayans form the third largest ancestry group in Uruguay, after Italian and Spanish Uruguayans. During the first half of the 19th century, Uruguay received the most French immigrants of any South American country. It constituted back then the second receptor of French immigrants in the New World after the United States. While the United States received 195,971 French immigrants between 1820 and 1855, 13,922 Frenchmen, most of them from the Basque Country and Béarn, left for Uruguay between 1833 and 1842.

The majority of immigrants were coming from the Basque Country, Béarn and Bigorre. Today, there are an estimated at 300,000 French descendants in Uruguay.

=== United Kingdom ===
French migration to the United Kingdom is a phenomenon that has occurred at various points in history. Many British people have French ancestry, and French remains the foreign language most learned by British people. Much of the UK's mediaeval aristocracy was descended from Franco-Norman migrants at the time of the Norman Conquest of England, and also during the Angevin Empire of the Plantagenet dynasty.

According to a study by Ancestry.co.uk, 3 million British people are of French descent. Among those are television presenters Davina McCall and Louis Theroux. There are currently an estimated 400,000 French people in the United Kingdom, most of them in London.

=== Costa Rica ===
The first French emigration in Costa Rica was a very small number to Cartago in the mid-nineteenth century. Due to World War II, a group of exiled French (mostly soldiers and families orphaned) migrated to the country.

=== Mexico ===
In Mexico, a sizeable population can trace its ancestry to France. After Spain, this makes France the second largest European ethnicity in the country. The bulk of French immigrants arrived in Mexico during the 19th and early 20th centuries.

From 1814 to 1955, inhabitants of Barcelonnette and the surrounding Ubaye Valley emigrated to Mexico by the dozens. Many established textile businesses between Mexico and France. At the turn of the 20th century, there were 5,000 French families from the Barcelonnette region registered with the French Consulate in Mexico. While 90% stayed in Mexico, some returned, and from 1880 to 1930, built grand mansions called Maisons Mexicaines and left a mark upon the city. Today the descendants of the Barcelonettes account for 80,000 descendants distributed around Mexico.

In the 1860s, during the Second Mexican Empire ruled by Emperor Maximilian I of Mexico—in collaboration with Mexican conservatives and part of Napoleon III's plan to create a Latin empire in the New World (indeed responsible for coining the term of "Amérique latine", "Latin America" in English)-- many French soldiers, merchants, and families set foot upon Mexican soil. Emperor Maximilian's consort, Carlota of Mexico, a princess of Belgium, was a granddaughter of Louis-Philippe of France.

Many Mexicans of French descent live in cities or states such as Zacatecas, San Luis Potosí, Sinaloa, Monterrey, Puebla, Guadalajara, and the capital, Mexico City, where French surnames such as Chairez/Chaires, Renaux, Pierres, Michel, Betancourt, Alaniz, Blanc, Ney, Jurado (Jure), Colo (Coleau), Dumas, or Moussier can be found. Today, Mexico has more than 3 million people of full and partial French descent. mainly living in the capital, Puebla, Guadalajara, Veracruz and Querétaro.

=== Chile ===
The French came to Chile in the 18th century, arriving at Concepción as merchants, and in the mid-19th century to cultivate vines in the haciendas of the Central Valley, the homebase of world-famous Chilean wine. The Araucanía Region also has an important number of people of French ancestry, as the area hosted settlers arrived by the second half of the 19th century as farmers and shopkeepers. With something akin to Hispanic culture, the French immigrants quickly assimilated into mainstream Chilean society.

From 1875 to 1895, 80% of settlers were from southwestern France, especially from Basses-Pyrénées (Basque country and Béarn), Gironde, Charente-Inférieure and Charente and regions situated between Gers and Dordogne.

Most of French immigrants settled in the country between 1875 and 1895. Between October 1882 and December 1897, 8,413 Frenchmen settled in Chile. At the end of the century they were almost 30,000. According to the census of 1865, out of 23,220 foreigners established in Chile, 2,483 were French, the third largest European community in the country after Germans and Englishmen. In 1875, the community reached 3,000 members, 12% of the almost 25,000 foreigners established in the country. It was estimated that 10,000 Frenchmen were living in Chile in 1912, 7% of the 149,400 Frenchmen living in Latin America.

Today it is estimated that 800,000 Chileans are of French descent.

Former president of Chile Michelle Bachelet is of French origin, as was Augusto Pinochet. A large percentage of politicians, businessmen, professionals and entertainers in the country are of French ancestry.

=== Brazil ===
French immigrants to Brazil from 1913 to 1924
Year	French immigrants
1913	1,532
1914	696
1915	410
1916	292
1917	273
1918	226
1919	690
1920	838
1921	633
1922	725
1923	609
1924	634
Total	7,558

It is estimated that there are 1 million to 2 million or more Brazilians of French descent today. This gives Brazil the second largest French community in South America.

From 1819 to 1940, 40,383 Frenchmen immigrated to Brazil. Most of them settled in the country between 1884 and 1925 (8,008 from 1819 to 1883, 25,727 from 1884 to 1925, 6,648 from 1926 to 1940). Another source estimates that around 100,000 French people immigrated to Brazil between 1850 and 1965.

The French community in Brazil numbered 592 in 1888 and 5,000 in 1915. It was estimated that 14,000 Frenchmen were living in Brazil in 1912, 9% of the 149,400 Frenchmen living in Latin America, the second largest community after Argentina (100,000).

The Brazilian Imperial Family originates from the Portuguese House of Braganza and the last emperor's heir and daughter, Isabella, married Prince Gaston d'Orleans, Comte d'Eu, a member of the House of Orléans, a cadet branch of the Bourbons, the French Royal Family.

=== Guatemala ===
The first French immigrants were politicians such as Nicolas Raoul and Isidore Saget, Henri Terralonge and officers Aluard, Courbal, Duplessis, Gibourdel and Goudot. Later, when the Central American Federation was divided in 7 countries, Some of them settled to Costa Rica, others to Nicaragua, although the majority still remained in Guatemala. The relationships start to 1827, politicians, scientists, painters, builders, singers and some families emigrated to Guatemala. Later in a Conservative government, annihilated nearly all the relations between France and Guatemala, and most of French immigrants went to Costa Rica, but these relationships were again return to the late of the nineteenth century.

=== Latin America ===
Elsewhere in the Americas, French settlement took place in the 16th to 20th centuries. They can be found in Haiti, Cuba (refugees from the Haitian Revolution) and Uruguay. The Betancourt political families who influenced Peru, Colombia, Venezuela, Ecuador, Puerto Rico, Bolivia and Panama have some French ancestry.

=== Huguenots ===
Large numbers of Huguenots are known to have settled in the United Kingdom (from 50,000), Ireland (10,000), in Protestant areas of Germany (especially the city of Berlin) (from 40 000), in the Netherlands (from 50 000), in South Africa and in North America. Many people in these countries still bear French names.

=== Asia ===
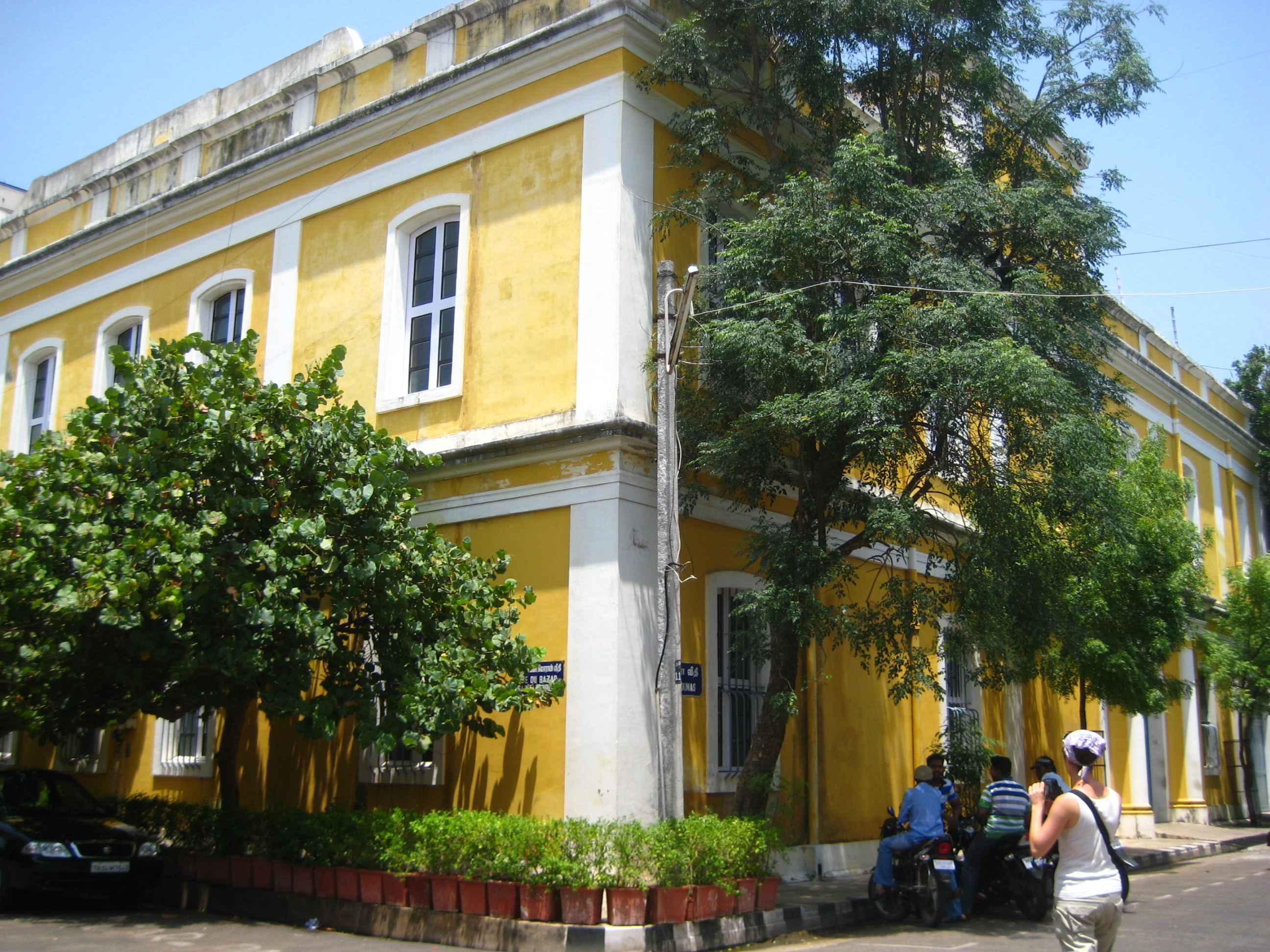
Building of the École française d'Extrême-Orient in Pondicherry

In Asia, a proportion of people with mixed French and Vietnamese descent can be found in Vietnam. Including the number of persons of pure French descent. Many are descendants of French settlers who intermarried with local Vietnamese people. Approximately 5,000 in Vietnam are of pure French descent, however, this number is disputed. A small proportion of people with mixed French and Khmer descent can be found in Cambodia. These people number approximately 16,000 in Cambodia, among this number, approximately 3,000 are of pure French descent. An unknown number with mixed French and Lao ancestry can be found throughout Laos. A few thousand French citizens of Indian, European or creole ethnic origins live in the former French possessions in India (mostly Pondicherry). In addition to these Countries, small minorities can be found elsewhere in Asia; the majority of these living as expatriates.

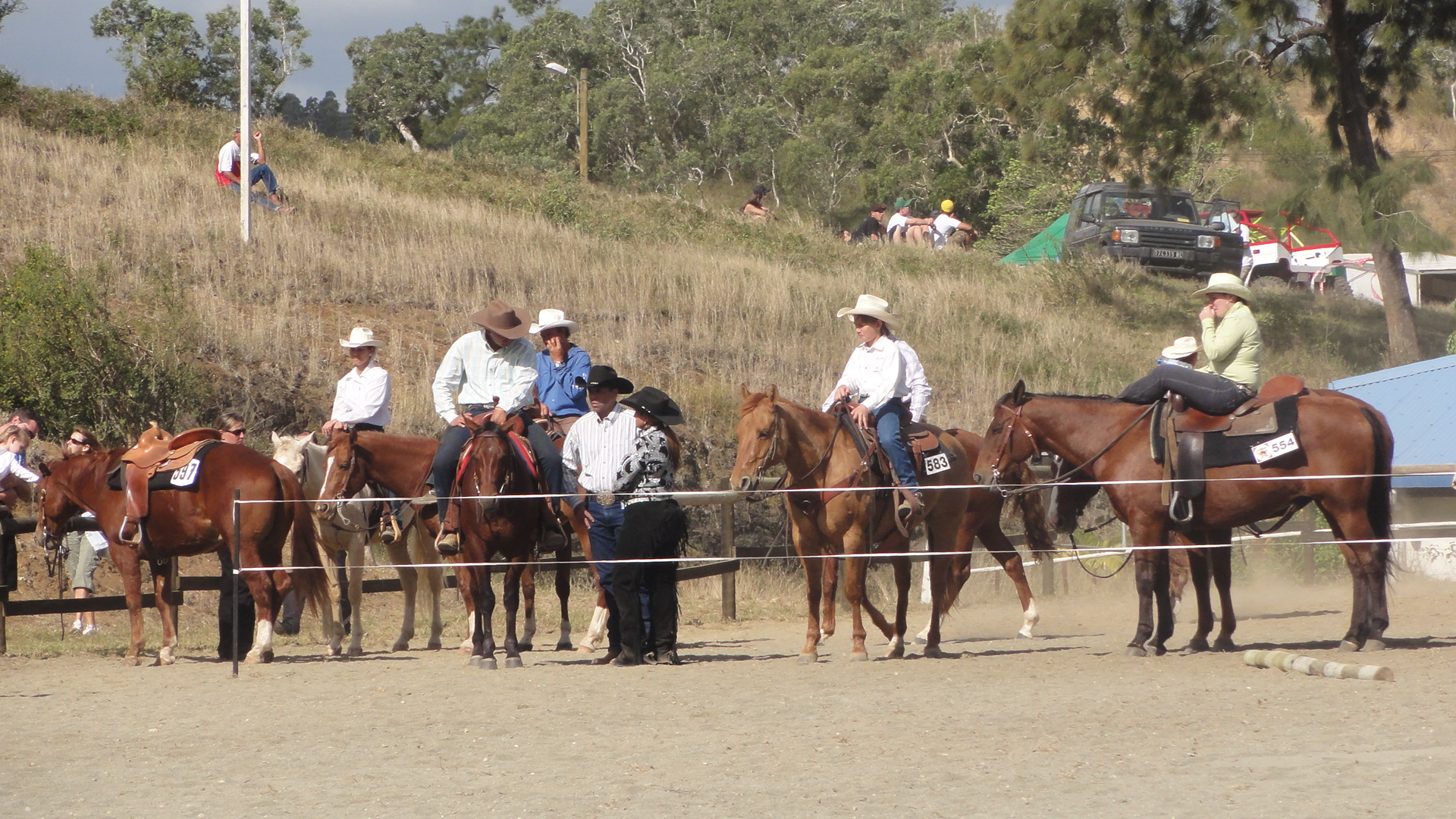
French people born in New Caledonia

=== Scandinavia ===
During the great power era, about 100 French families came to Sweden. They had mainly emigrated to Sweden as a result of religious oppression. These include the Bedoire, De Laval and De Flon families. Several of whom worked as merchants and craftsmen. In Stockholm, the French Lutheran congregation was formed in 1687, later dissolved in 1791, which was not really an actual congregation but rather a series of private gatherings of religious practice.

=== Elsewhere ===
Apart from Québécois, Acadians, Cajuns, and Métis, other populations with some French ancestry outside metropolitan France include the Caldoches of New Caledonia, Louisiana Creole people of the United States, the so-called Zoreilles and Petits-blancs of various Indian Ocean islands, as well as populations of the former French colonial empire in Africa and the West Indies.

== See also ==
- Demographics of France
- Armenians in France
- Cagot
- Ethnic groups in Europe
- Franco-Mauritian
- French Americans
- French Australian
- French Canadians
- French Peruvian
- Peruvians in France
- French people in Madagascar
- Genetic history of Europe
- History of the Jews in France
- List of French people
- List of French people of immigrant origin
- Pied-Noir – French citizens in French Algeria
