= Madeleine Truel =

Peruvian writer

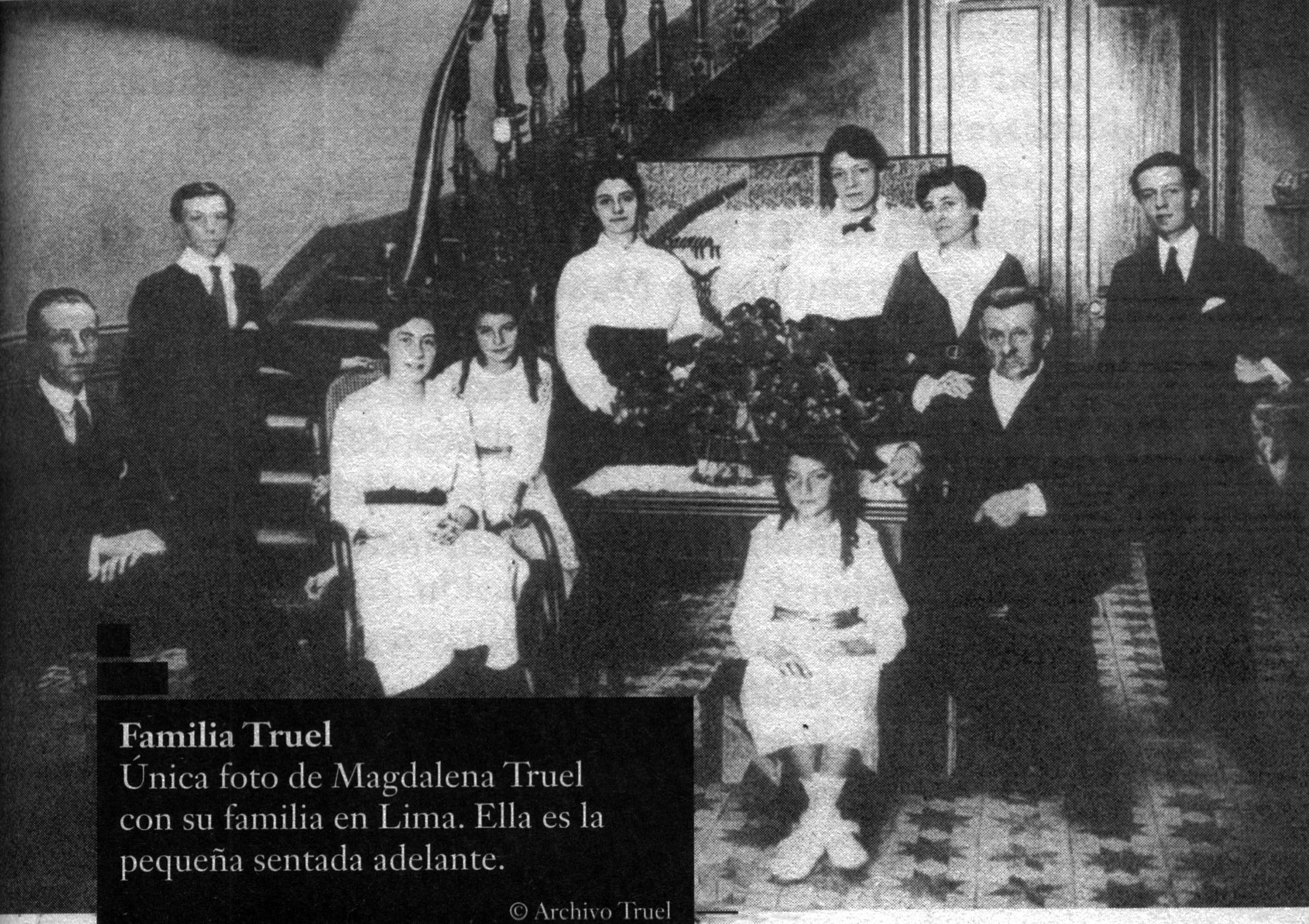
- Truel and her family in Lima
- Born: Madeleine Blanche Pauline Truel Larrabure; August 28, 1904; Lima, Peru
- Died: May 3, 1945 (aged 40); Stolpe, Germany
- Occupation: Writer
- Years active: ?–1945
- Notable work: L'Enfant du Metro

Madeleine Blanche Pauline Truel Larrabure (August 28, 1904 — May 3, 1945) was a Peruvian writer and document forger for the French Resistance during World War II. The exact date of her alliance is unknown. She was captured in 1944 and was tortured to extract information without success, following which she was sent to Sachsenhausen concentration camp in 1945. She died in Stolpe on 3 May 1945, after the so-called "death march", a few hours prior to the arrival of the Soviet Army. A monument dedicated to all those who were deported from France and perished during the war is located in front of Notre Dame Cathedral in Paris, bearing her full name.

== Early years ==
Alexandre Léon Truel and Marguerite Larrabure, were French immigrants who arrived in Peru in the second half of the 19th century. They had eight children of which Madeleine was the youngest daughter, born on 28 August 1904. Madeleine grew up in the family home located at number 54 of Lima's Arequipa street. She came from an observant Catholic family; Madeleine studied at the school San José de Cluny, located on the corner of Bolivia Street and Washington Street in downtown Lima. French was spoken in her home; this allowed her to perfect her command of French along with Spanish. Her father managed a hardware store located at 150 Jirón de la Unión.

Both of Madeleine Truel's parents died before she was 20, her mother died of an unknown illness. Her father died on 6 May 1918, in the clinic Maison de Santé in Lima, due to an infected leg wound acquired while he was working for the fire brigade putting out a fire at the "El Pergamino" shop. Alexandre Truel is recognized as a hero at the France Fire Brigade Nº3 and was decorated with the golden medal.

== Life in Paris ==
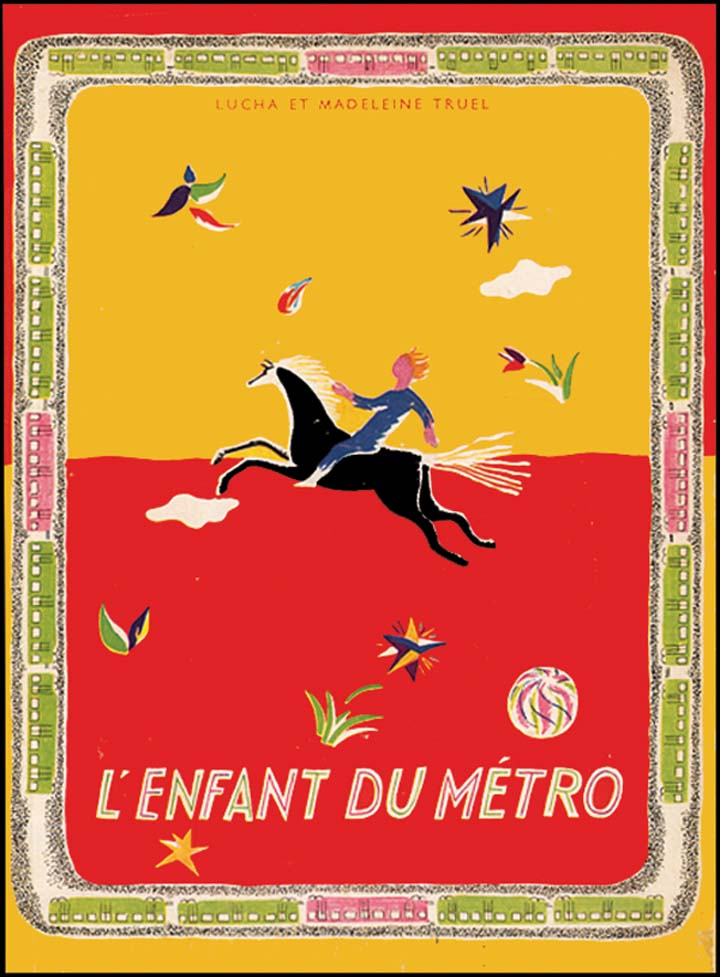
L'Enfant du Metro by Lucha and Madeleine Truel

Due to the absence of the parents and the rest of the older family members, the Truel siblings decided to return to France at the request of some family members in Paris in 1924. Over there Madeleine decided to study philosophy at the Sorbonne University. She found work as an administrative assistant in the first branch of the Spanish Bilbao bank, located on the Rue de Richelieu. She told her workmates anecdotes of her life in Peru, the traditions and current affairs. She liked to cook traditional Peruvian dishes.

In January 1942, Madeleine was knocked over by a Nazi army truck. She was diagnosed with multiple fractures to the cranium and legs. She spent a long time in the hospital. Due to this accident she had to endure a limp that stayed with her to her final days.

In 1943, she co-wrote the book The Boy of the Subway along with her sister Lucha. The book narrates a story of a boy who travels through the stations of the Paris subway. The book was dedicated to Pascal, the son of a family of Jewish-Romanian origins who were friends of hers. Her sister Lucha drew the illustrations for the book and Madeleine wrote the text. The publishers were Editions du Chêne.

== The French Resistance ==
In June 1940, The German forces invaded Paris. The Resistance was an underground network of organizations formed by French citizens who decided to fight against the Nazis. The married couple Pierre and Annie Hervé who were friends of Madeleine introduced her to The French Resistance. Madeleine's job was to forge documents, especially passports, which were delivered to Jewish fugitives and allied soldiers that had parachuted over the French capital. She used the pseudonym Marie.

On 19 June 1944, Truel was captured by three German agents when she was picking up ink in one of the resistance's hide-aways. Days before, a resistance comrade called Annie was captured and with the information gathered from her, the agents set a trap which led to Madeleine's capture. After being arrested she was driven to the SS office located on the Foch Avenue and then was temporarily transferred to the Fresnes prison. She was tortured by force to uncover details about the plans and the people of the resistance. She resisted and didn't give away any detail and assumed all the responsibility for her acts. Her family visited her and the only thing they could leave her was a Bible.

She was transferred to the Sachsenhausen concentration camp in 1945. In the concentration camp, she lived in a charitable manner. She distributed the small amount of food that she received to help those who needed it most. She maintained good spirits in spite of the hardships and she enlightened her cell-mates with nice stories that she remembered about Peru. For this reason she received the name "Bird of the Isles".

== Last moments ==
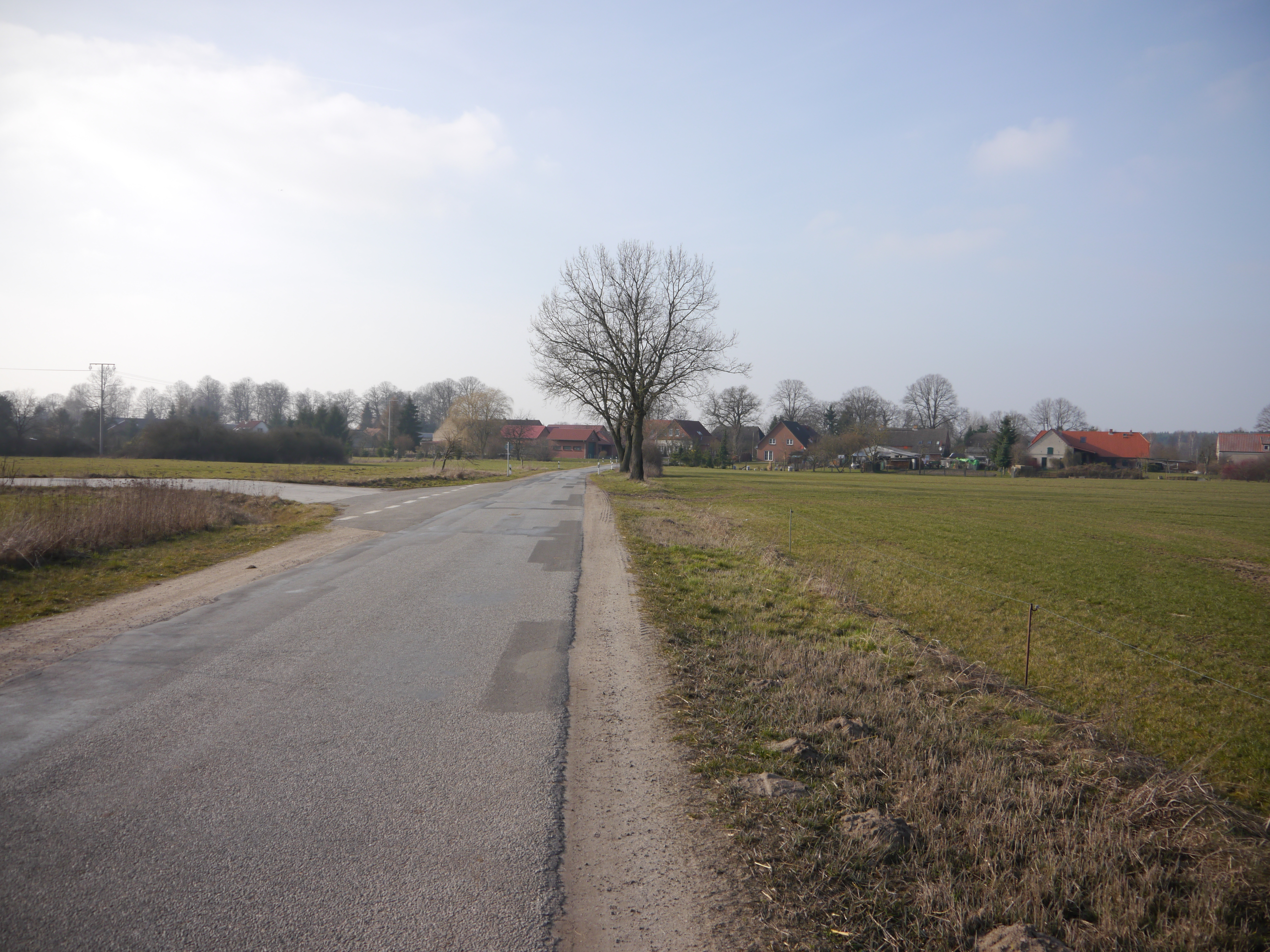
The approach to Stolpe from the south-east

The end of the war was near. The Soviet army was approaching from the east and the U.S. military from the west. German troops began to become disorganized and started to flee in what was to be known as the "Death March" which refers to the transfer of thousands of prisoners from the concentration camps near the war fronts in late 1944 and early 1945.

The Death March of Sachsenhausen concentration camp to Lübeck, located just over 100 miles away, began on 22 April. Many prisoners, exhausted by malnutrition and bad weather, were dying along the way. The purpose of these marches was to hide all evidence of the brutality that was suffered in the concentration camps. A German soldier impatient with the slowness of the marching prisoners began to beat some of them furiously with a steel rod. One of these victims was Madeleine.

A few hours later the Germans abandoned the marching prisoners and stripped off their uniforms to hide from the Russian troops that were pursuing them. Madeleine lost consciousness for a moment and was carried on a stretcher by her fellow prisoners. In spite of her small stature it took six people to do the task. The group of survivors arrived in a small German town called Stolpe. When she came to consciousness she suffered a strong headache and a high fever. Shortly afterwards, she died.
