= French migration to the United Kingdom =

French people in the United Kingdom
- Distribution by regional area at the 2011 census

Total population
- French-born residents in the United Kingdom: 165,871 – 0.2% (2021/22 Census) (Note: Does not include French born in the United Kingdom or those with French ancestry); England: 152,697 – 0.3% (2021); Scotland: 9,348 – 0.2% (2022); Wales: 2,625 – 0.08% (2021); Northern Ireland: 1,201 – 0.06% (2021); French citizens/passports held: 163,517 (England and Wales only, 2021); Other estimates: 189,000 (2020 ONS estimate); French ancestry 3,000,000 (2010 Ancestry.co.uk estimate)

Regions with significant populations
- London, South East England

Languages
- English, French

Religion
- Mainly Roman Catholicism and Protestantism; Judaism, Irreligious and other minority faiths

Related ethnic groups
- French people

French migration to the United Kingdom is a phenomenon that has occurred at various points in history. The Norman Conquest of England by William the Conqueror in 1066 resulted in the arrival of Normans, while in the 16th and 17th centuries Protestant Huguenots fled religious persecution to East London. Other waves (but less likely to have put down permanent roots) are associated with monasticism, particularly post-conquest Benedictines and Cistercians, aristocracy fleeing the French Revolution, expulsion of religious orders by the French Third Republic, and current expats.

The 2011 UK Census recorded 137,862 French-born people living in the UK. Almost half of these were resident in the capital, London. Many more British people have French ancestry.

French remains the foreign language most learned by Britons, usually taught in schools. It has traditionally been spoken as a second language by the country's educated classes and its popularity is reinforced by the close geographical proximity between the UK and France.

== History ==
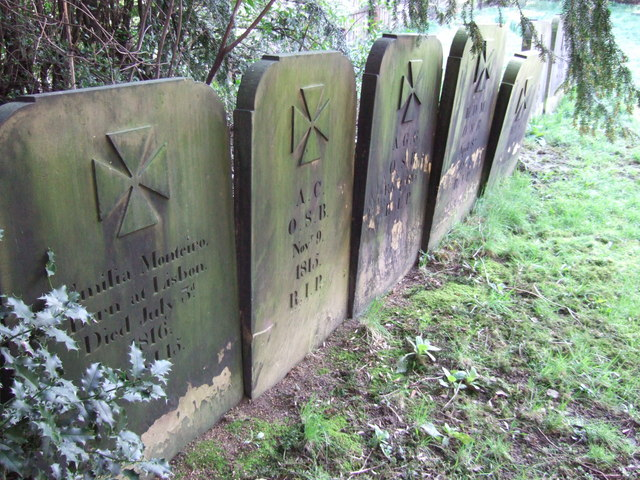
Graves of exiled French Benedictine nuns in Kirkthorpe, West Yorkshire

Much of the UK's medieval aristocracy was descended from Franco-Norman migrants to England from the time of the Norman Conquest. Prominent families of the period, include the Grosvenor family originally, "Gros Veneur" (in Norman) "great hunter": their influence can be found throughout central London with many roads, squares and buildings bearing their family names, such as Grosvenor Square and Grosvenor House. Ancestors of the Molyneux family, the Earls of Sefton who arrived in England around the time of the Norman Conquest, bore the name "de Molines": they came from Molineaux-sur-Seine, near Rouen, in Normandy where they resided in the Château de Robert-le-Diable also known as Château de Moulineaux. Other well known names are the Beauchamps (Beecham), Courtois and Le Mesurier.

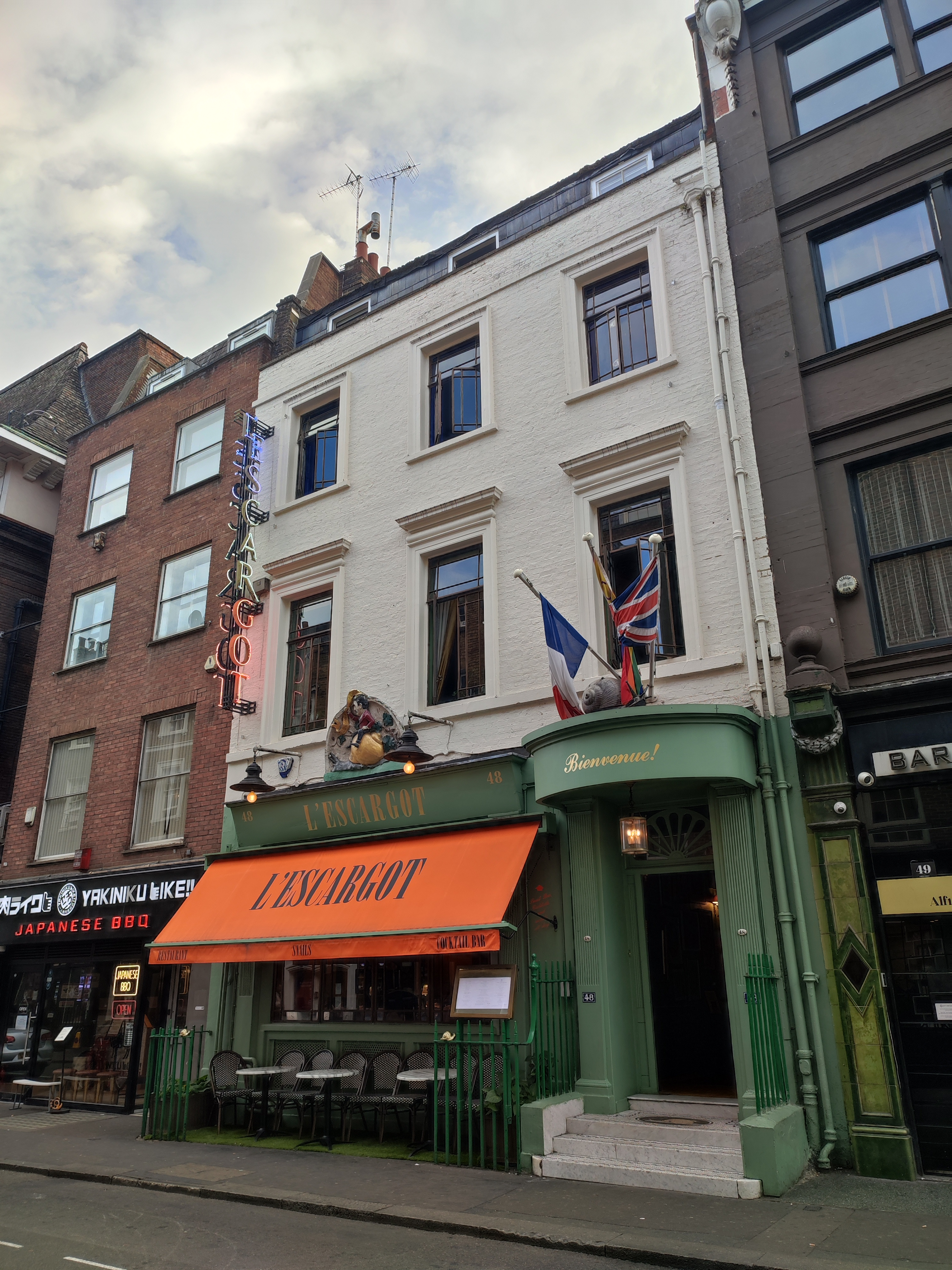
L'Escargot, Greek Street. London's oldest French restaurant, established in 1896.

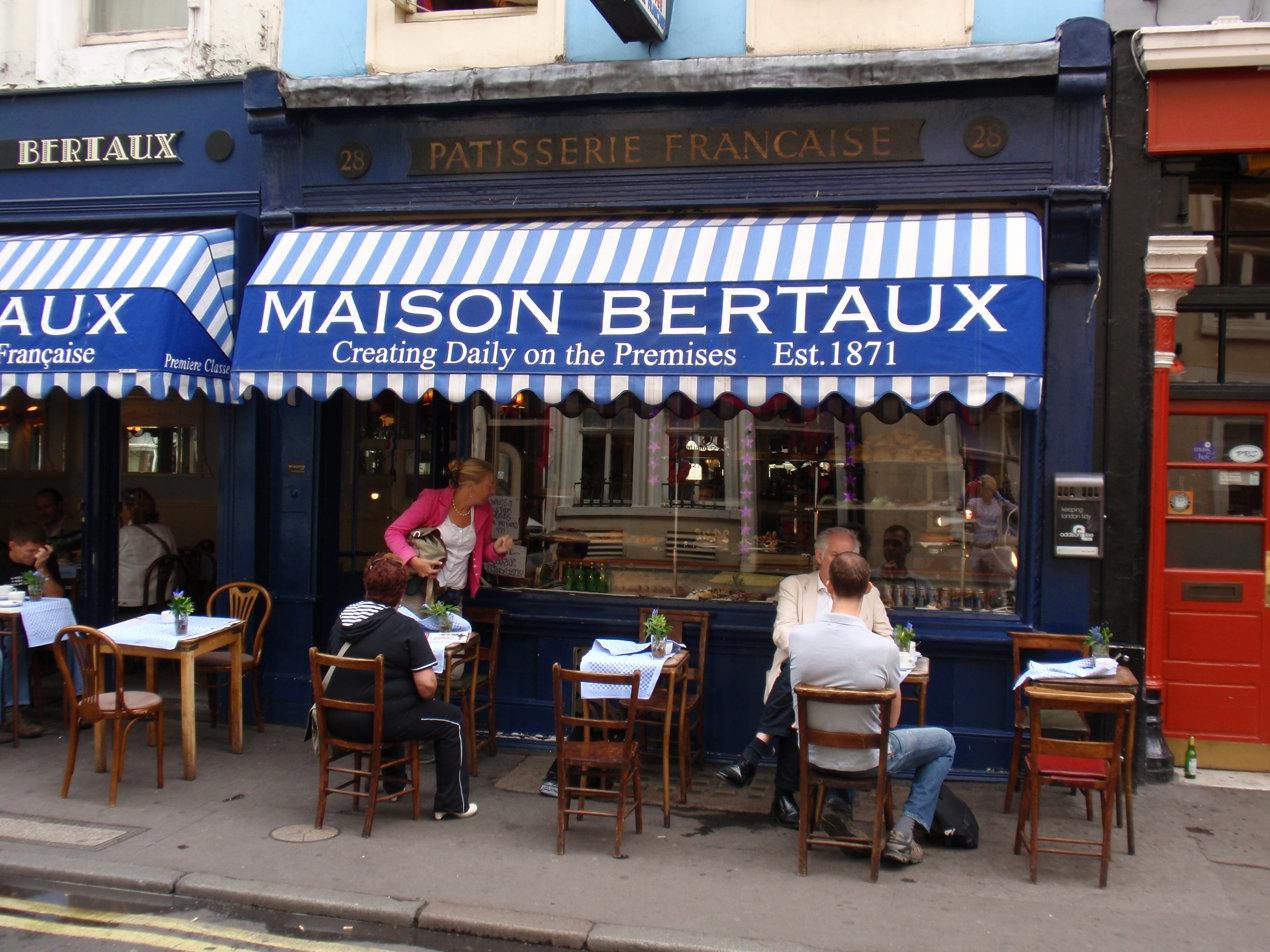
Maison Bertaux, Greek Street. It is the oldest Pâtisserie in London.

Some British people are descended from the Huguenots, French Protestants who in the 16th and 17th centuries fled religious persecution in France. Although a substantial French Protestant community existed in London from the sixteenth century, the suppression of Protestantism in France in the 1680s led to a mass migration of predominantly Calvinist refugees, most of whom settled in London, partly in Spitalfields in the east and Soho in the west. The French Protestant community was one of the largest and most distinctive communities in the capital in the 18th-century. Later, during and after the French Revolution, there was also an influx of French Catholics.

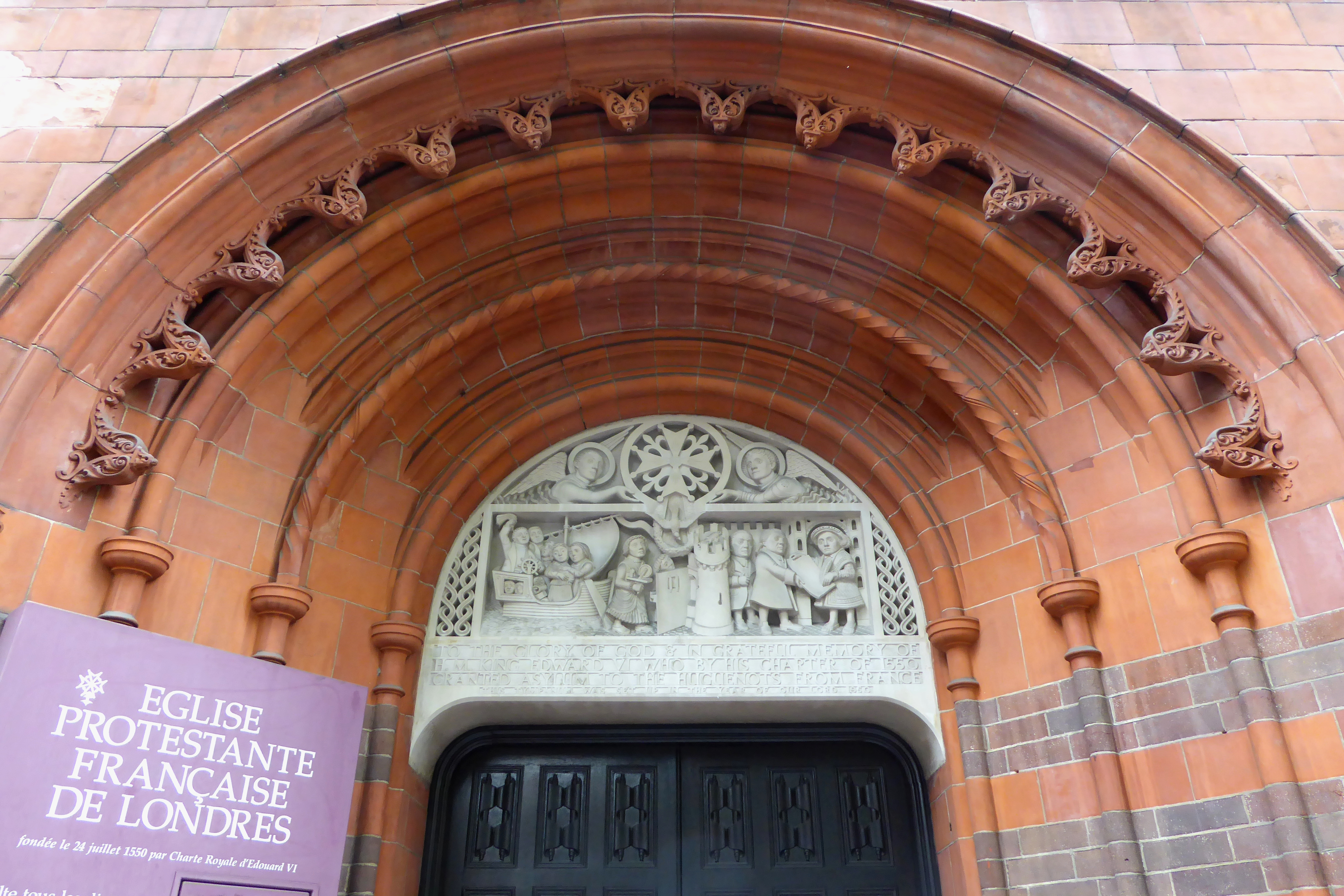
Arch above the Entrance to the French Protestant Church of London

== Population and distribution ==
A map showing the distribution of French-born people in London. 0.0%-0.49% 0.5%-0.99% 1%-1.49% 1.5%-2.49% 2.5%-3.99% 4% and greater

The 2011 UK Census recorded 127,601 French-born residents in England, 2,203 in Wales, 7,147 in Scotland, and 911 in Northern Ireland, making a UK total of 137,862. The previous, 2001 UK Census, had recorded 96,281 French-born residents. The Office for National Statistics estimates that 189,000 French-born immigrants were resident in the UK in 2020.

The 2021 census recorded 163,517 French passport holders resident in England and Wales. The number of residents of England and Wales born in France was recorded as 155,322.

Of the French-born people recorded by the 2011 census, 66,654 (48.4 per cent) lived in Greater London and 22,584 (16.4 per cent) in South East England. Within London, particular concentrations were recorded in the boroughs of Kensington and Chelsea, Westminster and Hammersmith and Fulham. There are several French schools in London, some independent, and others, La Petite École Française in west London and the Lycée Français Charles de Gaulle, situated in South Kensington are run by the French state. The French Consulate in London has estimated that 270,000 French people live in the city, but the ONS contests this, pointing out that the number of French passport holders recorded by the 2011 census was only 86,000. The French Embassy's estimate includes London plus "the south eastern quadrant of the UK including Kent, Oxfordshire and maybe Sussex too".

Many British people have French ancestry. According to a 2010 study by Ancestry.co.uk, three million British people are of French descent.

== Education ==
French international schools in the United Kingdom:

- Lycée Français Charles de Gaulle
- Lycée International de Londres Winston Churchill - London
- École française de Bristol
- École d'entreprise Total (Aberdeen)

== Notable people ==
Famous British people who can trace their ancestry back to France include Isambard Kingdom Brunel, Michel Roux Jr, Joanne Harris, Dustin Demri-Burns, Davina McCall, John Hegley, Simon Le Bon, Noel Fielding and Emma Watson. Top French chief executives attracted to Britain have been: Xavier Rolet (LSE) and Vincent de Rivaz (EDF Energy). In the kitchen chefs working in the UK include Raymond Blanc, who has spent most of his working life in Britain and presents cookery programmes on British television. Brothers Albert and Michel Roux, were the first chefs in Britain to be awarded three Michelin stars in 1982 for their restaurant, Le Gavroche. At the start of the 2011–12 season, aside from home-grown and Irish talent, there were more French-born footballers in the Premier League than any other nationality.Arsène Wenger was the Premier League's longest-serving manager, since assuming the role at Arsenal F.C. in October 1996 before retiring in May 2018, with many

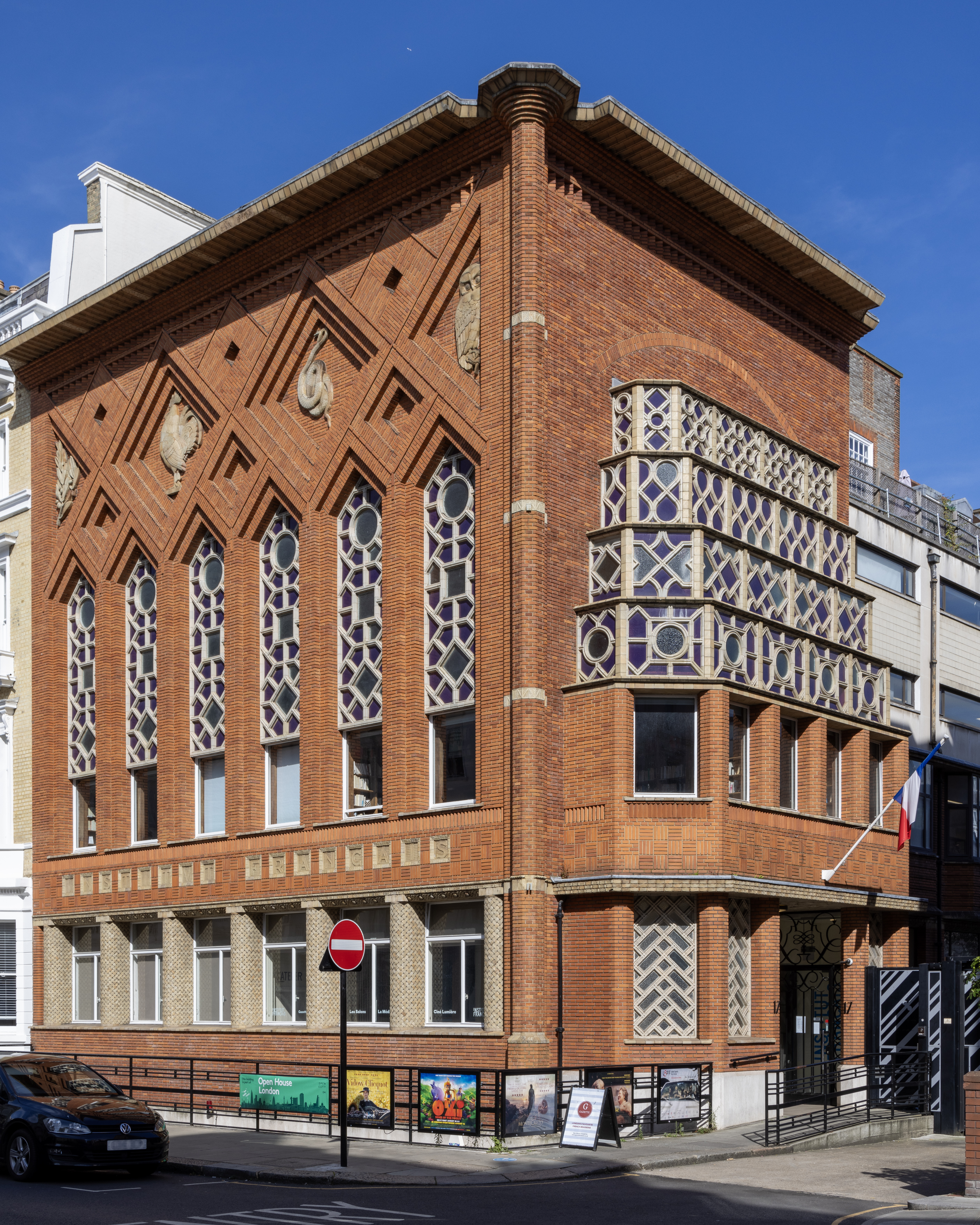
The French Institute of London, South Kensington

considering him the club's best manager of all time.

== See also ==
- France-United Kingdom relations
- British migration to France
- French diaspora
- French American
- French Canadian
