= Peruvians in France =

Peruvians in France Peruanos en Francia
Total population
- Peruvian-born residents 30,000

Regions with significant populations
- Greater Paris and South of France

Languages
- French, Spanish (Peruvian Spanish)

Religion
- Predominantly Christianity (including Roman Catholic and Evangelicals)

Related ethnic groups
- Peruvian people • Latin Americans in France • Spaniards in France • Hispanic • Latino • French Peruvian

Peruvians in France (Spanish: Peruanos en Francia), who form part of the larger Latin American community in France. In 2012, the stock of Peruvian-born immigrants was the third largest amongst all Latin American immigrants to France.

== Demographics ==
According to the "Migration Report of 2017", 30,000 Peruvian-born people were living in France. Peruvian immigrants to France, they do so mostly work and studies, this community is noticeable in large cities such as Paris, Lyon and Montpellier.

== Peruvian community in France ==
Peruvians form the third largest Latin American community in France, after Brazilians and Venezuelans, and it is one of the fastest-growing.

== Religions ==
In the 2007 census, 81.3% of the population over 12 years old described themselves as Catholic, 12.5% as Evangelical, 3.3% as of other denominations, and 2.9% as non-religious.[26] Lord of Miracles is a mural painted by a black slave in the 17th century of Jesus Christ that is venerated in Lima and the main Catholic festivity in Peru and one of the biggest processions around the world. Every year, in October, hundreds of thousands of faithful from all races and economic backgrounds dresses in purple to celebrate the also known "Black Christ" in a religious procession through the streets of Lima. Without doubt the earthquakes by Lima during the 17th and 18th centuries, which destroyed most of the city leaving only that mural standing up, contributed to the growth and the solidification of devoted veneration to the mural known as "Christ of Pachacamilla", In conclusion it is a mainly Catholic country.

== See also ==
- France–Peru relations
- French Peruvian
- Immigration to France
