= French Peruvians =

Peruvian citizens of French ancestry

French Peruvians Franco-Péruvienne Franco-Peruano
- (France) (Peru)

Regions with significant populations
- Callao, Lima, Trujillo, Arequipa, Ica

Languages
- Spanish, French

Religion
- Roman Catholicism

French Peruvians (French: français-péruvien; Spanish: franco-peruano) are Peruvian citizens of French ancestry, or those who immigrated to Peru from France. The French were the fourth largest group of immigrants to settle in the country after the Spanish and Italians.

== History ==
In 1872, the Sociedad de Inmigración Europea ("European Immigration Society") was founded in Peru. Its objective was promoting Old World immigration by covering the costs of their journeys and financially supporting them during their first settler years in Peru.

The regions where most of the French immigrants originated from were Bordeaux, Paris, as well as the French portion of the Basque Country. They mostly interacted with fellow French immigrants, and they were usually relatively skilled at a trade. Initially the community was united, but as time passed many intermarried with Peruvians from other European backgrounds. Very few French-Peruvians can trace their ancestry.

== Notable people ==
- Daniel Alomía Robles, composer of El Cóndor Pasa
- Fernando Belaúnde Terry, 49th and 52nd President of Peru
- Ricardo Belmont Cassinelli, politician
- Alex Fort Brescia, businessman
- Pedro Pablo Kuczynski, 59th President of Peru
- Gianfranco Labarthe, footballer
- Mariana Larrabure de Orbegoso, model
- Jean Pierre Magnet, saxophonist
- Verónika Mendoza, politician
- Juan Antonio Pezet, 16th President of Peru
- Iván Thays, author
- Madeleine Truel, fighter in the French Resistance
- Enrique Congrains, writer
- Pedro Paulet, engineer
- Yvonne Frayssinet, actress
- Paul Martin, actor
- Daniela Darcourt, singer
- Leslie Shaw, singer
- Nicole Faverón, beauty queen
- Juan Bielovucic, aviator
- Madeleine Hartog-Bel Houghton, Miss World 1967
- Pedro Labarthe, philosopher
- Eduardo Dibós, exmayor of Lima

== French Peruvian institutions and associations ==
- Asociación Franco-Peruana
- Asociación Civil Franco-Peruano
- Colegio Franco-Peruano http://www.lfrancope.edu.pe
- Asociación Técnica Franco Peruana
- Asociacion de Decendientes Franceses en Peru
- Asociacion Cultural Franco-Peruano
- Colegio Sagrado Corazon (Arequipa) http://www.ssccaqp.edu.pe
- Colegio Saint Andre/san andrew https://web.archive.org/web/20120222160738/http://www.denperu.com/sandrew/
- Edu France https://web.archive.org/web/20100111011638/http://www.edufrance-peru.com/
- Colegio Lycee Jean Baptiste Lamarck (Arequipa)

== See also ==
- France–Peru relations
- Peruvians in France
- French diaspora
