= Anglosphere =

Grouping of English-speaking nations

The Anglosphere, according to James Bennett (The Anglosphere Challenge) Core Anglosphere Middle Anglosphere (English is the official language or one of multiple, but natively spoken by a minority) Outer sphere (Officially English-using states of other language civilisations) Periphery (states where English is widely used but is not an official governmental language)

The Anglosphere is a Western-led sphere of influence among English-speaking countries with strong political, economic, cultural, and military ties. The core group of this sphere comprises five developed countries that maintain a close alliance: Australia, Canada, New Zealand, the United Kingdom, and the United States. Although extended definitions do include non-Western and developing countries that were once part of the British Empire and retained English influence and common law upon independence, the Anglosphere is a distinct grouping that is not simply synonymous with countries in which the English language has official status.

Anglosphere countries are generally aligned with each other on global issues and collaborate extensively in matters of military and security, as exemplified by alliances like Five Eyes or AUKUS. Five core countries of the Anglosphere are either NATO members or designated by the United States as major non-NATO allies.

== Definitions ==
According to science fiction writer Neal Stephenson in his 1995 book The Diamond Age, the Anglosphere is the Anglo-American sphere of influence. (Note: "The Anglosphere – shorthand for the Anglo-American sphere of influence – established the concept and structure of the modern transnational community.... The Anglosphere (in the narrow sense of the former British Empire, including Canada, Australia and New Zealand, and the US) has been the architect and a staunch proponent of international norms.") John Lloyd adopted the term in 2000 and defined it as including English-speaking countries like the United Kingdom, the United States, Canada, Australia, New Zealand, Ireland, South Africa, and the British West Indies. James C. Bennett defines anglosphere as "the English-speaking Common Law-based nations of the world", arguing that former British colonies that retained English common law and the English language have done significantly better than counterparts colonised by other European powers. The Merriam-Webster dictionary defines the Anglosphere as "the countries of the world in which the English language and cultural values predominate". (Note: "The group of countries where English is the main native language." (Shorter Oxford English Dictionary (6th ed.), Oxford University Press, 2007, ISBN 978-0-19-920687-2 ).) Similarly, recent studies describe the Anglosphere as a non-continuous region united by the concept of a transnational imagined community, grounded in shared language, history, and cultural values. However the Anglosphere is usually not considered to include all countries where English is an official language, so it is not synonymous with anglophone.

=== Core Anglosphere ===
The definition is usually taken to include Australia, Canada, New Zealand, the United Kingdom, and the United States in a grouping of developed countries called the core Anglosphere. The term Anglosphere can also include but frequently omits Ireland and the Commonwealth Caribbean countries despite their similar domestic primacy of the English language and common law.

The five core countries in the Anglosphere are developed countries that maintain close cultural and diplomatic links with one another. They are aligned under such military and security programmes as:

- ABCANZ Armies
- Air and Space Interoperability Council (air forces)
- AUKUS, a 2021 trilateral security partnership between Australia, the United Kingdom, and the United States focused on Australia acquiring nuclear-powered attack submarines
- AUSCANNZUKUS (navies)
- Border Five
- Combined Communications Electronics Board (communications electronics)
- Five Eyes (intelligence)
- Five Nations Passport Group
- Migration 5
- The Technical Cooperation Program (technology and science)
- The UKUSA Agreement (signals intelligence).

For over a century, relations have been warm between Anglosphere countries, with bilateral partnerships such as those between Australia and New Zealand, the United States and Canada and the United States and the United Kingdom (the Special Relationship) constituting the most successful partnerships in the world.

In terms of political systems, Canada, Australia, New Zealand and the United Kingdom have a king, Charles III, as head of state, form part of the Commonwealth of Nations and use the Westminster parliamentary system of government. The United States is a presidential republic. Most of the core countries have first-past-the-post electoral systems, though Australia and New Zealand have reformed their systems and there are other systems used in some elections in the UK. As a consequence, most core Anglosphere countries have politics dominated by two major parties.

Below is a table comparing the five core countries of the Anglosphere (data for 2025):

Country	Population	Land area (km^{2})	Nominal GDP (USD bn)	GDP (PPP) (USD bn)	GDP (PPP) per capita (USD)	Military spending (PPP) (USD bn)
Australia	26,974,026	7,692,020	1,772	1,980	72,138	32.2
Canada	40,126,723	9,984,670	2,225	2,730	65,707	39.2
New Zealand	5,251,899	262,443	249	299	55,450	3.2
United Kingdom	69,551,332	241,930	3,839	4,448	63,661	91.0
United States	347,275,807	9,833,520	30,507	30,507	89,105	954
Core Anglosphere	489,179,787	27,329,350	38,592	39,964	82,271	1,119.6
as % of world	5.9%	18.4%	34.1%	19.4%	3.3×	25.7%

== Culture and economics ==
1888 pamphlet by George Fraser Black defending Peelian principles over gendarmerie

Due to their historic links, the Anglosphere countries share many cultural traits that still persist today. Most countries in the Anglosphere follow the rule of law through common law rather than civil law, and favour democracy with legislative chambers above other political systems. Private property is protected by law or constitution.

Market freedom is high in the five core Anglosphere countries, as all five share the Anglo-Saxon economic model – a capitalist model that emerged in the 1970s based on the Chicago school of economics with origins from the 18th century United Kingdom. The shared sense of globalisation led cities such as New York, London, Los Angeles, Sydney, and Toronto to have considerable impacts on the international markets and the global economy. Global popular culture has been highly influenced by the United States and the United Kingdom.

== Proponents and critics ==
Proponents of the Anglosphere concept typically come from the political right (such as Andrew Roberts of the UK Conservative Party), and critics from the centre-left (for example Michael Ignatieff of the Liberal Party of Canada).

=== Proponents ===
As early as 1897, Albert Venn Dicey proposed an Anglo-Saxon "intercitizenship" during an address to the Fellows of All Souls at Oxford.

The American businessman James C. Bennett, a proponent of the idea that there is something special about the cultural and legal (common law) traditions of English-speaking nations, writes in his 2004 book The Anglosphere Challenge:

The Anglosphere, as a network civilization without a corresponding political form, has necessarily imprecise boundaries. Geographically, the densest nodes of the Anglosphere are found in the United States and the United Kingdom. English-speaking Canada, Australia, New Zealand, Ireland and English-speaking South Africa (who constitute a very small minority in that country) are also significant populations. The English-speaking Caribbean, English-speaking Oceania and the English-speaking educated populations in Africa and India constitute other important nodes.

Bennett argues that there are two challenges confronting his concept of the Anglosphere. The first is finding ways to cope with rapid technological advancement and the second is the geopolitical challenges created by what he assumes will be an increasing gap between anglophone prosperity and economic struggles elsewhere.

British historian Andrew Roberts claims that the Anglosphere has been central in the First World War, Second World War and Cold War. He goes on to contend that anglophone unity is necessary for the defeat of Islamism.

According to a 2003 profile in The Guardian, historian Robert Conquest favoured a British withdrawal from the European Union in favour of creating "a much looser association of English-speaking nations, known as the 'Anglosphere'".

==== CANZUK ====
Favourability ratings tend to be overwhelmingly positive between countries within a subset of the core Anglosphere known as CANZUK (consisting of Canada, Australia, New Zealand and the United Kingdom), whose members form part of the Commonwealth of Nations and retain Charles III as head of state. In the wake of the United Kingdom's decision to leave the European Union (Brexit) as a result of a referendum held in 2016, some politicians and organisations have expressed support for a loose free travel and common market area to be formed among the CANZUK countries.

=== Criticisms ===
In 2000, Michael Ignatieff wrote in an exchange with Robert Conquest, published by the New York Review of Books, that the term neglects the evolution of fundamental legal and cultural differences between the US and the UK, and the ways in which UK and European norms drew closer together during Britain's membership in the EU through regulatory harmonisation. Of Conquest's view of the Anglosphere, Ignatieff writes: "He seems to believe that Britain should either withdraw from Europe or refuse all further measures of cooperation, which would jeopardize Europe's real achievements. He wants Britain to throw in its lot with a union of English-speaking peoples, and I believe this to be a romantic illusion".

In 2016, Nick Cohen wrote in an article titled "It's a Eurosceptic fantasy that the 'Anglosphere' wants Brexit" for The Spectator's Coffee House blog: "'Anglosphere' is just the right's PC replacement for what we used to call in blunter times 'the white Commonwealth'." He repeated this criticism in another article for The Guardian in 2018. Similar criticism was presented by other critics such as Canadian academic Srđan Vučetić.

In 2018, amidst the aftermath of the Brexit referendum, two British professors of public policy Michael Kenny and Nick Pearce published a critical scholarly monograph titled Shadows of Empire: The Anglosphere in British Politics (ISBN 978-1509516612). In one of a series of accompanying opinion pieces, they questioned:

The tragedy of the different national orientations that have emerged in British politics after empire—whether pro-European, Anglo-American, Anglospheric or some combination of these—is that none of them has yet been the compelling, coherent and popular answer to the country's most important question: How should Britain find its way in the wider, modern world?

They stated in another article:

Meanwhile, the other core English-speaking countries to which the Anglosphere refers, show no serious inclination to join the UK in forging new political and economic alliances. They will, most likely, continue to work within existing regional and international institutions and remain indifferent to – or simply perplexed by – calls for some kind of formalised Anglosphere alliance.

== See also ==
- Anglophile
- British diaspora
- Commonwealth realm
  - Commonwealth diaspora
- Dominion
- English-speaking world
- Eurosphere; Francophonie (French), Hispanosphere (Spanish), Lusosphere (Portuguese)
- History of the English-Speaking Peoples (Winston Churchill)
- List of countries and territories where English is an official language
- List of countries by English-speaking population
- White Anglo-Saxon Protestant (WASP)
