= UKUSA Agreement =

Multilateral signals intelligence treaty signed in 1946

The UKUSA community: Australia, Canada, New Zealand, the United Kingdom, and the United States

The United Kingdom – United States of America Agreement (UKUSA /ˌjuːkuːˈsɑː/ YOO-koo-SAH) (Note: Also known as the Quadripartite Agreement or Quadripartite Pact.) is a multilateral agreement for cooperation in signals intelligence between Australia, Canada, New Zealand, the United Kingdom, and the United States. The alliance of intelligence operations is also known as the Five Eyes. In classification markings this is abbreviated as FVEY, with the individual countries being abbreviated as AUS, CAN, NZL, GBR, and USA, respectively.

Emerging from an informal agreement related to the 1941 Atlantic Charter, the secret treaty was renewed with the passage of the 1943 BRUSA Agreement, before being officially enacted on 5 March 1946 by the United Kingdom and the United States. In the following years, it was extended to encompass Canada, Australia, and New Zealand. Other countries, known as "third parties", such as West Germany, the Philippines, and several Nordic countries, also joined the UKUSA community in associate capacities, although they are not part of the mechanism for automatic sharing of intelligence that exists between the Five Eyes.

Much of the sharing of information is performed via the ultra-sensitive STONEGHOST network, which has been claimed to contain "some of the Western world's most closely guarded secrets". Besides laying down rules for intelligence sharing, the agreement formalized and cemented the "Special Relationship" between the UK and the US.

Due to its status as a secret treaty, its existence was not known to the prime minister of Australia until 1973, and it was not disclosed to the public until 2005. On 25 June 2010, for the first time in history, the full text of the agreement was publicly released by the United Kingdom and the United States, and can now be viewed online. Shortly after its release, the seven-page UKUSA Agreement was recognized by Time magazine as one of the Cold War's most important documents, with immense historical significance.

The global surveillance disclosure by Edward Snowden has shown that the intelligence-sharing activities between the First World allies of the Cold War are rapidly shifting into the digital realm of the Internet.

== History ==
=== Origins (1940s–1950s) ===
The parties agree to the exchange of the products of the following operations relating to foreign communications:-

1. Collection of traffic.
2. Acquisition of communications documents and equipment.
3. Traffic analysis.
4. Cryptanalysis.
5. Decryption and translation.
6. Acquisition of information regarding communications organizations, procedures, practices and equipment.

— AMENDMENT NO. 4 TO THE APPENDICES TO THE UKUSA AGREEMENT (THIRD EDITION), page 5

The agreement originated from a ten-page 1943 British–US Communication Intelligence Agreement, BRUSA. The UKUSA Agreement connected the signal intercept networks of the UK Government Communications Headquarters (GCHQ) and the US National Security Agency (NSA) at the beginning of the Cold War. The document was signed on 5 March 1946 by Colonel Patrick Marr-Johnson for the UK's London Signals Intelligence Board and Lieutenant General Hoyt Vandenberg for the US State–Army–Navy Communication Intelligence Board. Although the original agreement states that the exchange would not be "prejudicial to national interests", the United States often blocked information sharing from Commonwealth countries. The full text of the agreement was released to the public on 25 June 2010.

The "Five Eyes" term has its origins as a shorthand for a "AUS/CAN/NZ/UK/US EYES ONLY" classification level.

=== Onset of the Cold War (1950s–1960s) ===
Under the agreement, the GCHQ and the NSA shared intelligence on the Soviet Union, the People's Republic of China, and several Eastern Bloc countries (known as Exotics). The network was expanded in the 1960s into the Echelon collection and analysis network.

The treaty was extended to include Canada (1948), Australia (1956) and New Zealand (1956). In 1955, the agreement was updated to designate Canada, Australia and New Zealand as "UKUSA-collaborating Commonwealth countries". Other countries that joined as "third parties" were Norway (1952), Denmark (1954) and West Germany (1955).

=== Investigations (1970–90s) ===
In the aftermath of the 1973 Murphy raids on the headquarters of the Australian Security Intelligence Organisation (ASIO), the existence of the UKUSA Agreement was revealed to Australia's Prime Minister Gough Whitlam. After learning about the agreement, Whitlam discovered that Pine Gap, a secret surveillance station close to Alice Springs, Northern Territory, had been operated by the US Central Intelligence Agency (CIA).

At the height of the 1975 Australian constitutional crisis, the use and control of Pine Gap by the CIA was strongly opposed by Whitlam, who fired the chief of the ASIO before being dismissed as prime minister.

The existence of several intelligence agencies of the Five Eyes was not revealed until the following years:

1974
In Canada, an investigative television report on CBC News's newsmagazine program The Fifth Estate revealed the existence of the Communications Security Establishment Canada (CSEC).
1975
In the United States, the Church Committee of the Senate revealed the existence of the National Security Agency (NSA).
1976
In Britain, an investigative article in Time Out magazine revealed the existence of the Government Communications Headquarters (GCHQ).
1977
In Australia, the Hope Commission revealed the existence of Australian Secret Intelligence Service (ASIS) and the Defence Signals Directorate (DSD).
1980
In New Zealand, the existence of the Government Communications Security Bureau (GCSB) was officially disclosed on a "limited basis".

In 1999, the Australian government acknowledged that it "does co-operate with counterpart signals intelligence organisations overseas under the UKUSA relationship."

The existence of the UKUSA Agreement, however, was not publicly revealed until 2005. The contents of the agreement were officially disclosed to the public on 25 June 2010. Four days later, the agreement was described by Time magazine as one of the "most important documents in the history of the Cold War."

=== Recent media leaks ===
In July 2013, as part of the 2013 Edward Snowden revelations, it emerged that the NSA is paying GCHQ for its services, with at least £100 million of payments made between 2010 and 2013.

On 11 September 2013, The Guardian released a leaked document provided by Edward Snowden which reveals a similar agreement between the NSA and Israel's Unit 8200.

According to The Sydney Morning Herald, Australia operates clandestine surveillance facilities at its embassies "without the knowledge of most Australian diplomats". These facilities are part of an international espionage program known as STATEROOM.

== Security and intelligence agencies ==
Although the UKUSA alliance is often associated with the ECHELON system, processed intelligence is reliant on multiple sources of information and the intelligence shared is not restricted to signals intelligence. The following table provides an overview of the government agencies involved and their respective responsibilities within the "Five Eyes" community:

Country	Signals intelligence	Defence intelligence	Security intelligence	Human intelligence
United Kingdom	Government Communications Headquarters (GCHQ)	Defence Intelligence (DI)	Security Service a.k.a. MI5	Secret Intelligence Service (SIS) a.k.a. MI6
United States	National Security Agency (NSA)	Defense Intelligence Agency (DIA)	Federal Bureau of Investigation (FBI)	Central Intelligence Agency (CIA)
Australia	Australian Signals Directorate (ASD)	Defence Intelligence Organisation (DIO)	Australian Security Intelligence Organisation (ASIO)	Australian Secret Intelligence Service (ASIS)
Canada	Communications Security Establishment (CSE)	Canadian Forces Intelligence Command (CFINTCOM)	Canadian Security Intelligence Service (CSIS)	
New Zealand	Government Communications Security Bureau (GCSB)	Directorate of Defence Intelligence and Security (DDIS)	New Zealand Security Intelligence Service (NZSIS)	

== Global coverage ==
Although precise assignments are classified, it is generally known that each member of the UKUSA alliance takes lead responsibility for intelligence collection and analysis in different parts of the globe.

=== Five Eyes ===
The Five Eyes (often abbreviated as FVEY) are an intelligence alliance comprising Australia, Canada, New Zealand, the United Kingdom and the United States. These countries are bound by the multilateral UKUSA Agreement, a treaty for joint cooperation in signals intelligence.

==== Australia ====
Australia monitors South Asia and East Asia.

==== Canada ====
Canada's geographical proximity to the Soviet Union provided considerable eavesdropping advantages during the Cold War. Canada continues to monitor the Russian and Chinese interior while managing intelligence assets in Latin America.

==== New Zealand ====
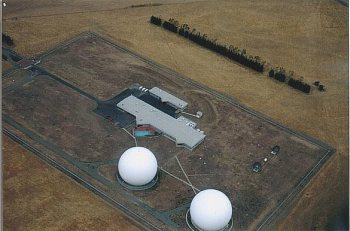
The Waihopai Valley Facility – base of the New Zealand branch of the ECHELON Program

In addition to Southeast Asia, New Zealand is responsible for the western Pacific and maintains listening posts in the South Island at Waihopai Valley just south-west of Blenheim, and on the North Island at Tangimoana.

==== United Kingdom ====
Africa, Europe, European Russia, Middle East, China and Hong Kong.

==== United States ====
The US is focused on the Middle East, Russia, and China, in addition to the Caribbean and Africa.

=== 9 Eyes, 14 Eyes, and other "third parties" ===
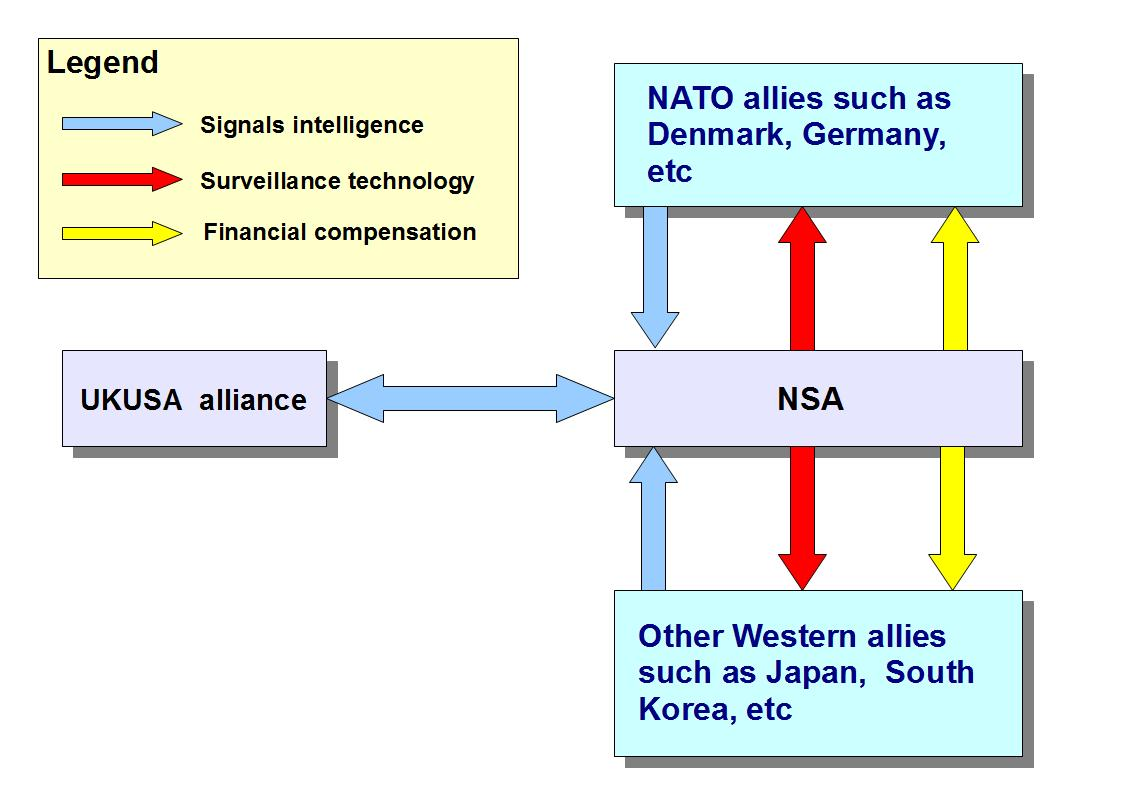
This diagram depicts the relationship between the US National Security Agency (NSA) and the so-called "second parties", which comprises the UKUSA community, and the "third parties" made up of members of the North Atlantic Treaty Organization (NATO) and other Western allies: NSA and second parties—Extensive mutual sharing of signals intelligence NSA and third parties—Signals intelligence is funnelled to the NSA in exchange for surveillance technology and monetary compensation.

The "Five Eyes" community is part of an extensive alliance of Western countries sharing signals intelligence with each other. These allied countries include NATO members, other European countries such as Sweden, and allies in the Pacific, in particular Singapore and South Korea.

In the 1950s several Nordic countries joined the community as "third party" participants. They were soon followed by Denmark (1954) and West Germany (1955).

According to Edward Snowden, the NSA has a "massive body" called the Foreign Affairs Directorate that is responsible for partnering with other Western allies such as Israel.

Unlike the "second party" members (that is, the Five Eyes themselves), "third party" partners are not automatically exempt from intelligence targeting. According to an internal NSA document leaked by Snowden, "We (the NSA) can, and often do, target the signals of most 3rd party foreign partners."

The Five Eyes are cooperating with various 3rd Party countries in at least two groups:

- The "Nine Eyes", consisting of the Five Eyes plus Denmark, France, the Netherlands, and Norway.
- The "Fourteen Eyes", consisting of the same countries as the Nine Eyes plus Germany, Belgium, Italy, Spain, and Sweden. The actual name of this group is SIGINT Seniors Europe (SSEUR) and its purpose is coordinating the exchange of military signals intelligence among its members.

Germany is reportedly interested in moving closer to the inner circle: an internal GCHQ document from 2009 said that the "Germans were a little grumpy at not being invited to join the 9-Eyes group." Germany may even wish to join Five Eyes. Referring to Five Eyes, former French President François Hollande has said that his country is "not within that framework and we don't intend to join." According to a former top US official, "Germany joining would be a possibility, but not France – France itself spies on the US far too aggressively for that."

== Controversy ==
During the 2013 NSA leaks Internet spying scandal, the surveillance agencies of the "Five Eyes" have been accused of intentionally spying on one another's citizens and willingly sharing the collected information with each other, allegedly circumventing laws preventing each agency from spying on its own citizens.

The 2013 NSA leaks are not entirely new, but rather, they are a confirmation of earlier disclosures about the UK-US espionage alliance. For example, the British newspaper The Independent reported back in 1996 that the US National Security Agency "taps UK phones" at the request of the British intelligence agency MI5, thus allowing British agents to evade restrictive limitations on domestic telephone tapping.

The mutual surveillance and sharing of information between allies of the UK and US resurfaced again during the 2013 mass surveillance disclosures. As described by the news magazine Der Spiegel, this was done to circumvent domestic surveillance regulations:

Britain's GCHQ intelligence agency can spy on anyone but British nationals, the NSA can conduct surveillance on anyone but Americans, and Germany's BND (Bundesnachrichtendienst) foreign intelligence agency can spy on anyone but Germans. That's how a matrix is created of boundless surveillance in which each partner aids in a division of roles. They exchanged information. And they worked together extensively. That applies to the British and the Americans, but also to the BND, which assists the NSA in its Internet surveillance.

In 2013, Canadian federal judge Richard Mosley strongly rebuked the Canadian Security Intelligence Service (CSIS) for outsourcing its surveillance of Canadians to overseas partner agencies. A 51-page ruling says that the CSIS and other Canadian federal agencies are illegally enlisting US and British allies in global surveillance dragnets, while keeping domestic federal courts in the dark.

== Gallery ==
=== Officially released ===
The following documents were jointly released by the NSA and the GCHQ in 2010:

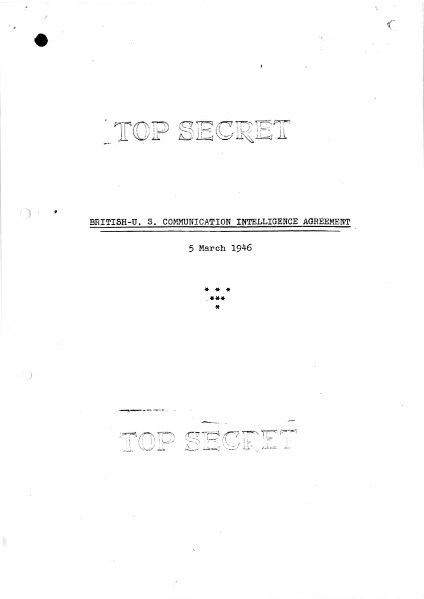
Cover page of the 1946 UKUSA Agreement

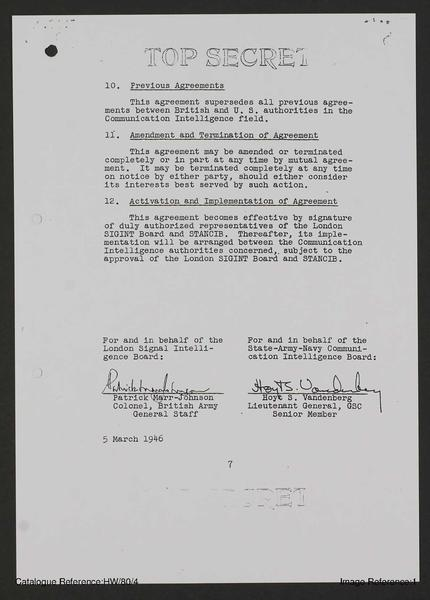
Signatures of the Chiefs of staff of Britain and America (March 1946)

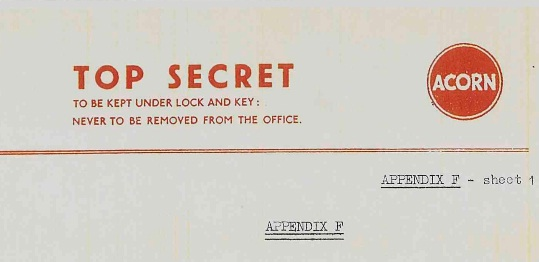
Text under the Top Secret heading: "To be kept under lock and key: Never to be removed from office." (Appendix F)

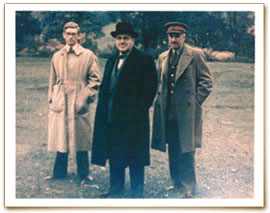
Photograph of British cryptoanalysts Harry Hinsley, Sir Edward Travis, and John Tiltman

=== Disclosed by Edward Snowden ===
The following documents were leaked by Edward Snowden during the course of the 2013 Global surveillance disclosure:

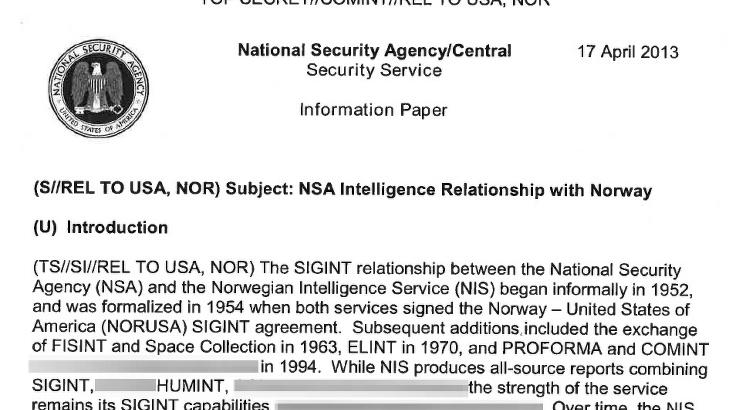
NSA's relationship with Norway's NIS (April 2013)

NSA's relationship with Sweden's FRA under the UKUSA Agreement (April 2013)

Details of NSA's agreement to share personal data of US citizens with Israel's ISNU

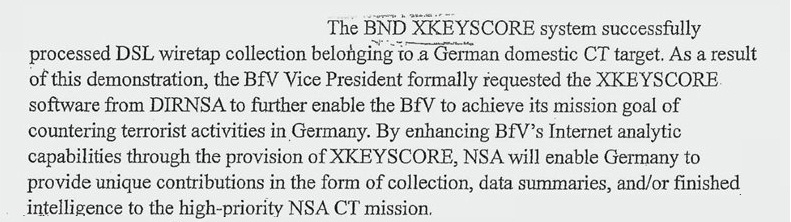
NSA document reveals the German BND's usage of the NSA's XKeyscore to provide "unique contributions".

NSA document on a joint espionage operation with Canada's CSEC agency during the G8 and G20 summits in Toronto in 2010

NSA's relationship with Canada's CSEC

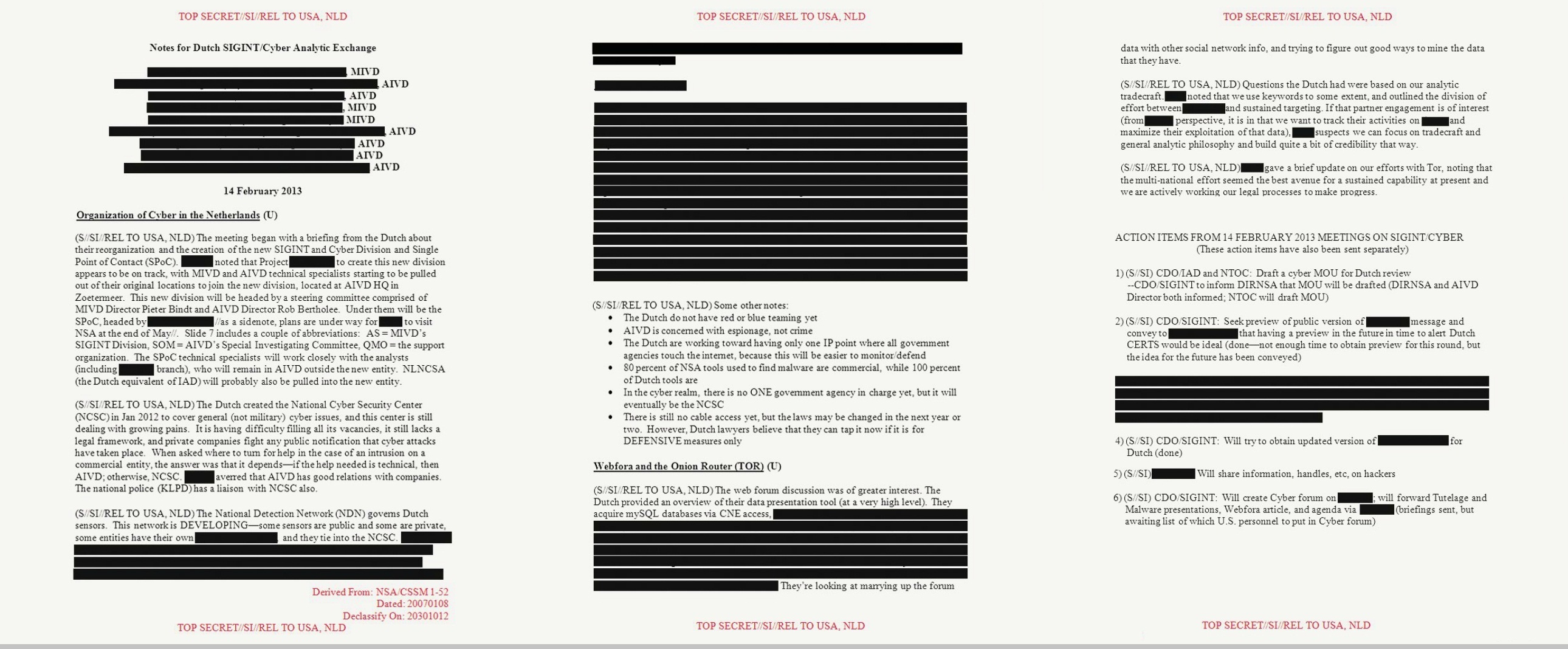
Summary of a meeting held in February 2013 between the NSA and the Dutch intelligence services AIVD and MIVD

== See also ==
- ABCA Armies
- Air and Space Interoperability Council (air forces)
- Allied technological cooperation during World War II
- Anglosphere
- AUKUS
- AUSCANNZUKUS (navies)
- British intelligence agencies
- CANZUK
- Collective intelligence
- Combined Communications Electronics Board (communication-electronics)
- Five Eyes (intelligence)
- Five Nations Passport Group
- Signals intelligence by alliances, nations and industries
- Special Relationship
- The Technical Cooperation Program (technology and science)
- Tizard Mission
- United States Intelligence Community
