= Five Eyes =

Anglosphere intelligence alliance

- Members shown in blue
- Working language: English
- Type: Intelligence alliance
- Members: Australia; Canada; New Zealand; United Kingdom; United States

Establishment
  - Atlantic Charter: 14 August 1941; 85 years ago
  - BRUSA Agreement: 17 May 1943; 83 years ago

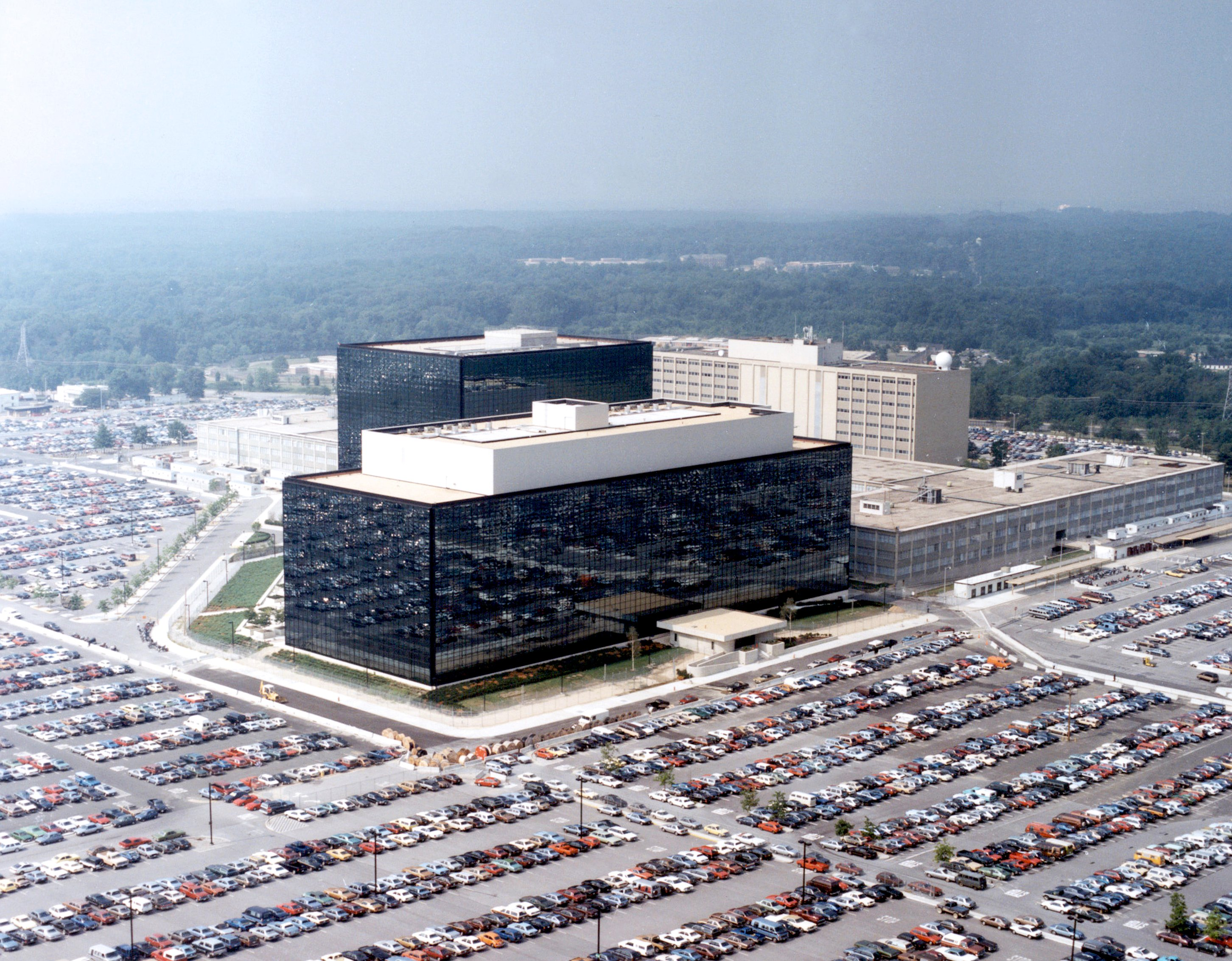
NSA headquarters, Fort Meade, Maryland, United States

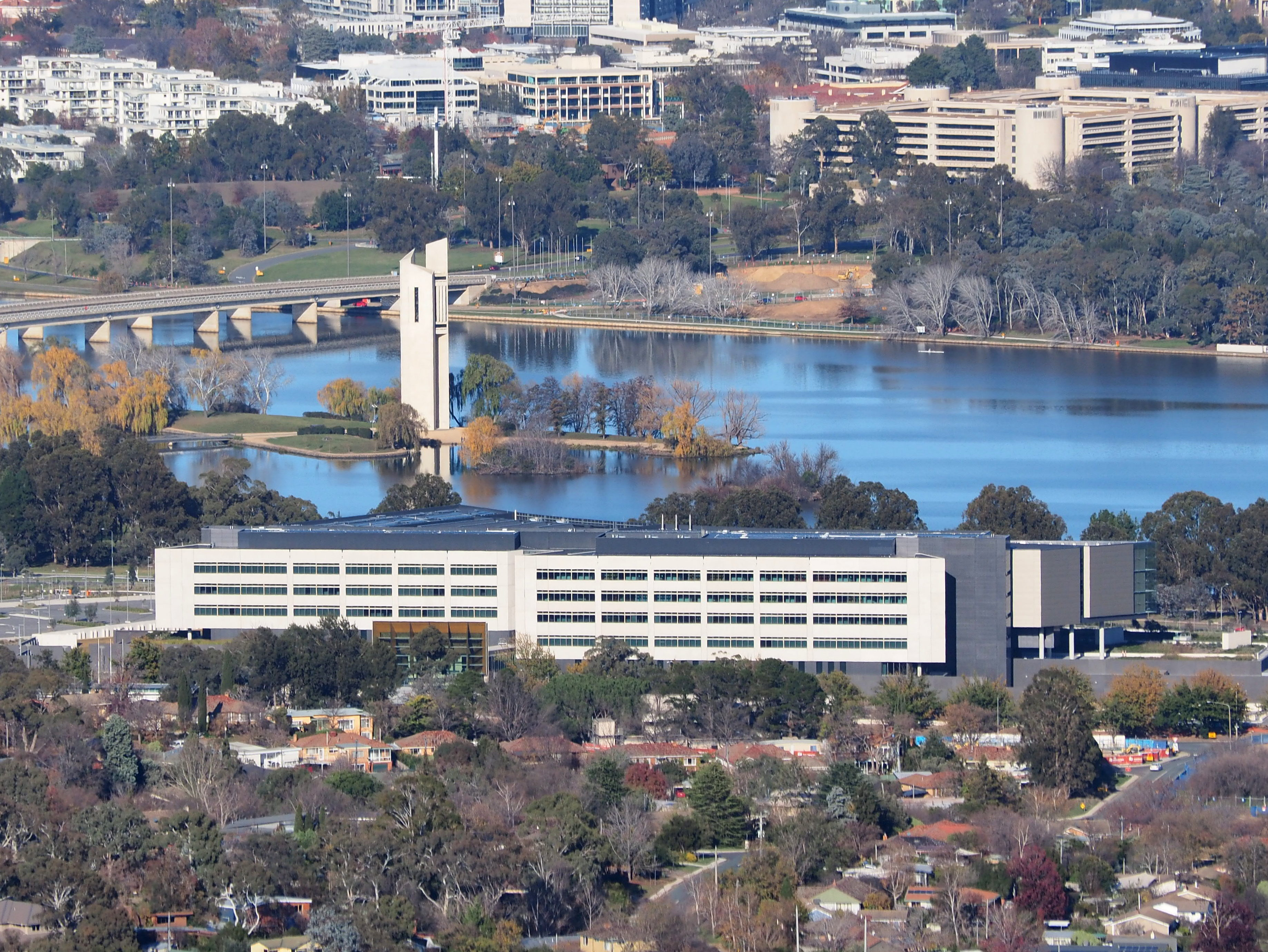
ASIO central office, Canberra, Australia

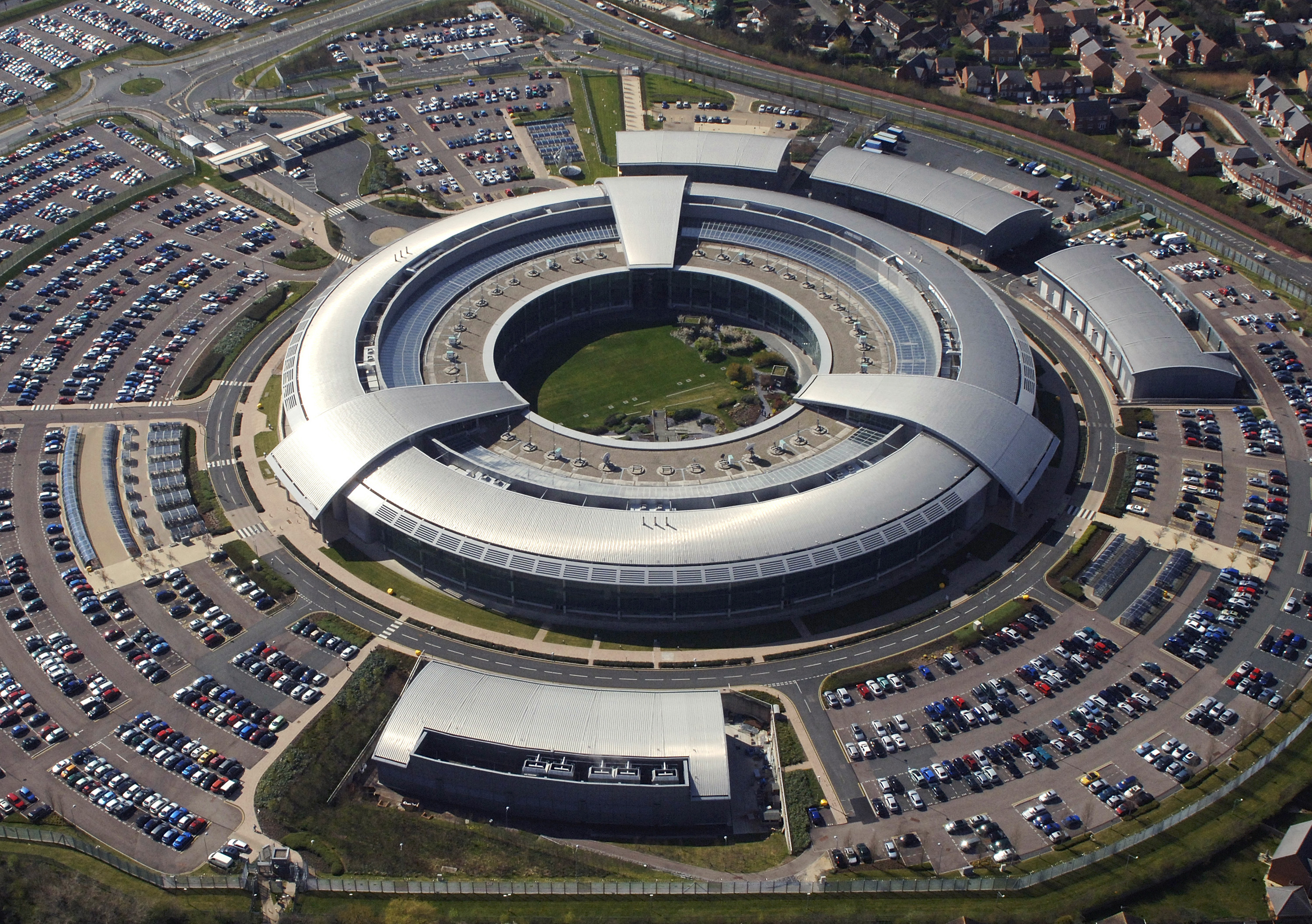
GCHQ, Cheltenham, Gloucestershire, United Kingdom

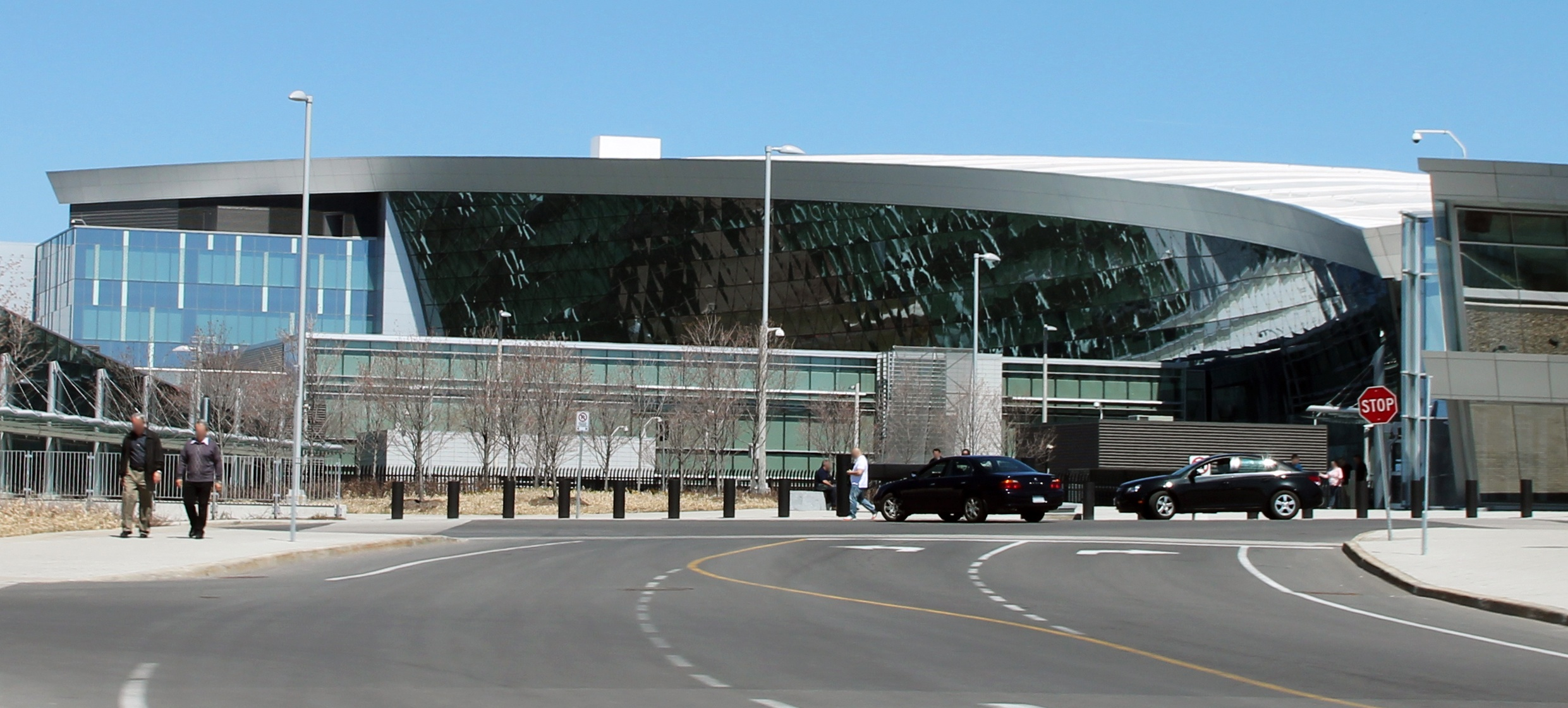
CSE headquarters, Ottawa, Ontario, Canada

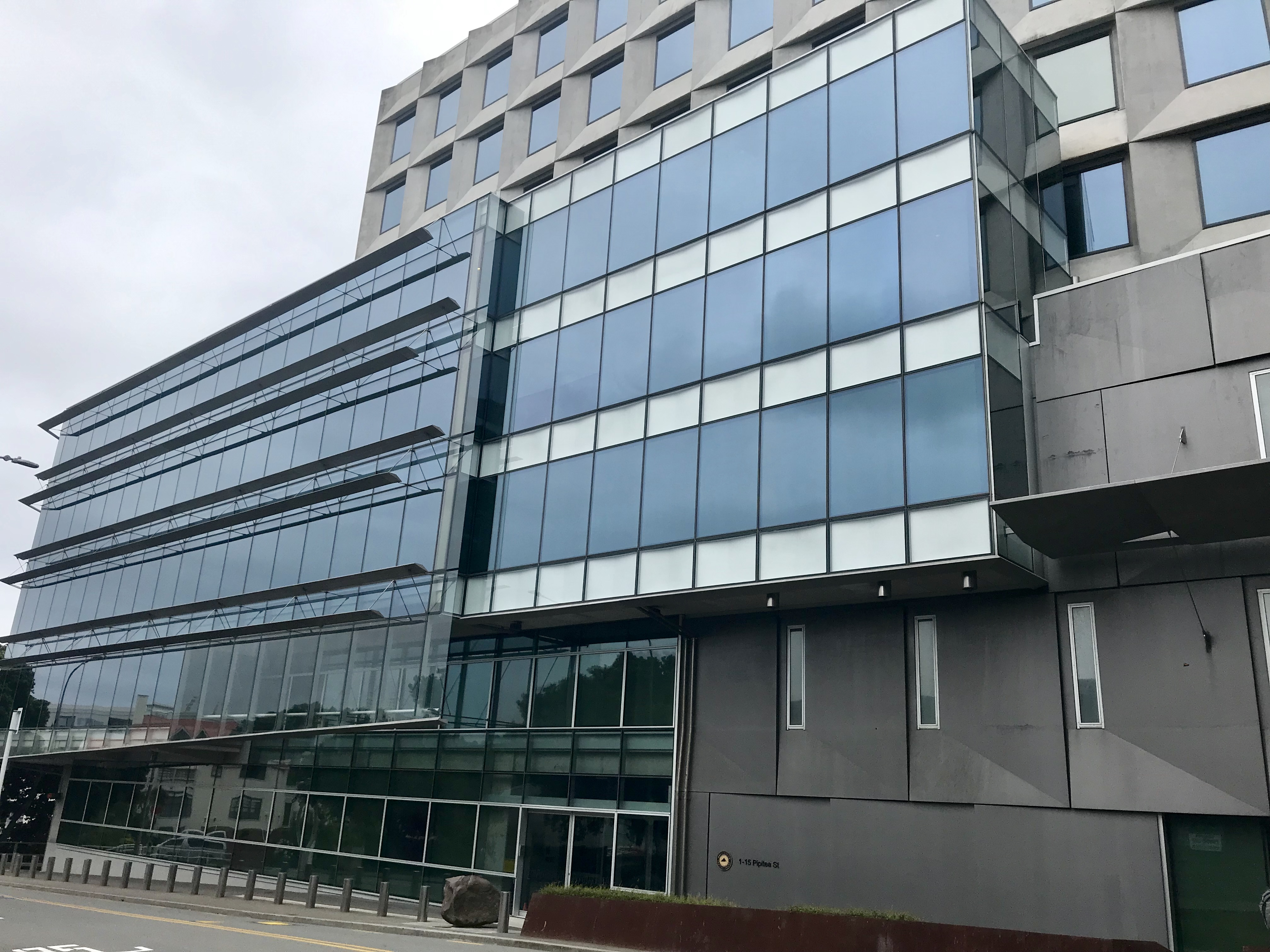
NZSIS headquarters, Wellington, New Zealand

The Five Eyes (FVEY) is an Anglosphere intelligence alliance comprising Australia, Canada, New Zealand, the United Kingdom, and the United States. These countries are party to the multilateral UKUSA Agreement, a treaty for joint cooperation in signals intelligence. Informally, "Five Eyes" can refer to the group of intelligence agencies of these countries. The term "Five Eyes" originated as shorthand for a "AUS/CAN/NZ/UK/US Eyes Only" (AUSCANNZUKUS) releasability caveat.

The origins of the FVEY can be traced to informal, secret meetings during World War II between British and American code-breakers that took place before the US formally entered the war. The alliance was formalized in the post-war era by the UKUSA Agreement in 1946. As the Cold War deepened, the intelligence sharing arrangement was formalised under the ECHELON surveillance system in the 1960s. This system was developed by the FVEY to monitor the communications of the Soviet Union and Eastern Bloc; it is now used to monitor communications worldwide. The FVEY expanded its surveillance capabilities during the course of the war on terror, with much emphasis placed on monitoring the Internet. The alliance has grown into a robust global surveillance mechanism, adapting to new domains such as international terrorism, cyberattacks, and contemporary regional conflicts.

The alliance's activities, often shrouded in secrecy, have occasionally come under scrutiny for their implications on privacy and civil liberties, sparking debates and legal challenges. In the late 1990s, the existence of ECHELON was disclosed to the public, triggering a debate in the European Parliament and, to a lesser extent, the United States Congress and British Parliament. Former NSA contractor Edward Snowden described the Five Eyes as a "supra-national intelligence organisation that does not answer to the known laws of its own countries". Disclosures in the 2010s revealed FVEY was spying on one another's citizens and sharing the collected information with each other, although the FVEY nations maintain this was done legally.

Five Eyes is among the most comprehensive espionage alliances. Since processed intelligence is gathered from multiple sources, the information shared is not restricted to signals intelligence (SIGINT) and often involves military intelligence (MILINT), human intelligence (HUMINT), and geospatial intelligence (GEOINT).

== Organisations ==
The following table provides an overview of most of the FVEY agencies that share data.

Main agencies sharing data as part of Five Eyes alliance, by country
Country	Agency	Abbreviation	Role
Australia	Australian Secret Intelligence Service	ASIS	Human intelligence
Australia	Australian Signals Directorate	ASD	Signal intelligence
Australia	Australian Security Intelligence Organisation	ASIO	Security intelligence
Australia	Australian Geospatial-Intelligence Organisation	AGO	Geo intelligence
Australia	Defence Intelligence Organisation	DIO	Defence intelligence
Canada	Canadian Forces Intelligence Command	CFINTCOM	Defence intelligence, geo intelligence, human intelligence
Canada	Communications Security Establishment	CSE	Signal intelligence
Canada	Canadian Security Intelligence Service	CSIS	Human intelligence, security intelligence
Canada	Royal Canadian Mounted Police	RCMP	Security intelligence
New Zealand	Directorate of Defence Intelligence and Security	DDIS	Defence intelligence
New Zealand	Government Communications Security Bureau	GCSB	Signal intelligence
New Zealand	New Zealand Security Intelligence Service	NZSIS	Human intelligence, security intelligence
United Kingdom	Defence Intelligence	DI	Defence intelligence
United Kingdom	Government Communications Headquarters	GCHQ	Signal intelligence
United Kingdom	Security Service	MI5	Security intelligence
United Kingdom	Secret Intelligence Service	MI6, SIS	Human intelligence
United States	Central Intelligence Agency	CIA	Human intelligence
United States	Defense Intelligence Agency	DIA	Defense intelligence
United States	Federal Bureau of Investigation	FBI	Security intelligence
United States	National Geospatial-Intelligence Agency	NGA	Geo intelligence
United States	National Security Agency	NSA	Signal intelligence

== History ==
=== Origins (1941–1950s) ===
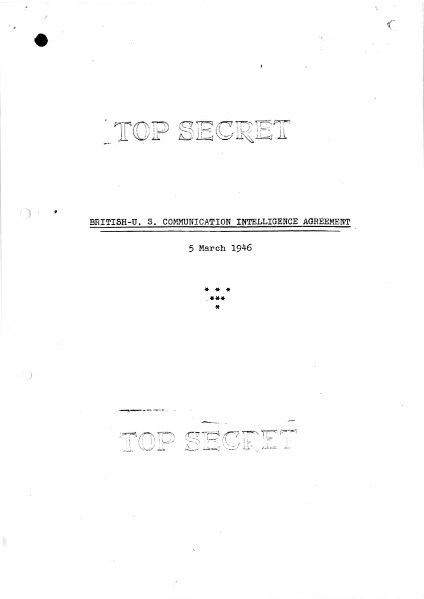
The cover page of the first version of the secret UKUSA Agreement in 1946, which was disclosed to the public in 2011

The informal origins of the Five Eyes alliance were secret meetings between British and US code-breakers at the British code-breaking establishment Bletchley Park in February 1941, before the US entry into the war. The first record of these meetings is a February 1941 diary entry from Alastair Denniston, head of Bletchley Park, reading "The Ys are coming!" with "Ys" referring to "Yanks". An entry from 10 February reads "Ys arrive". British and US intelligence shared extremely confidential information, including that the British had broken the German Enigma code and that the US had broken the Japanese Purple code. For the rest of the war, key figures like Denniston and code-breaking expert Alan Turing travelled back and forth across the Atlantic. The informal relationship established for wartime signals intelligence developed into a formal, signed agreement at the start of the Cold War.

The formal Five Eyes alliance can be traced back to the August 1941 Atlantic Charter, which laid out Allied goals for the post-war world. On 17 May 1943, the UK and US governments signed the British–US Communication Intelligence Agreement, also known as the BRUSA Agreement, to facilitate co-operation between the US War Department and the British Government Code and Cypher School. On 5 March 1946, the two governments formalized their secret treaty as the UKUSA Agreement, the basis for all signal intelligence cooperation between the NSA and GCHQ up to the present.

UKUSA was extended to include Canada in 1948, followed by Norway in 1952, Denmark in 1954, West Germany in 1955, and Australia and New Zealand in 1956. These countries participated in the alliance as "third parties". By 1955, a newer version of the UKUSA Agreement officially acknowledged the formal status of the remaining Five Eyes countries with the following statement:

At this time only Canada, Australia and New Zealand will be regarded as UKUSA-collaborating Commonwealth countries.

=== Cold War ===
During the Cold War, GCHQ and the NSA shared intelligence on the Soviet Union, China, and several eastern European countries known as "Exotics". Over the course of several decades, the ECHELON surveillance network was developed to monitor the military and diplomatic communications of the Soviet Union and its Eastern Bloc allies.

In 1953, SIS and the CIA jointly orchestrated the overthrow of Iran's Prime Minister Mohammad Mosaddegh.

From 1955 through 1975 during the Vietnam War, Australian and New Zealand operators in the Asia-Pacific region worked to directly support the United States while GCHQ operators stationed in British Hong Kong as part of GCHQ Hong Kong were tasked with monitoring North Vietnamese air defence networks.

In 1961, SIS and the CIA jointly orchestrated the assassination of the Congolese independence leader Patrice Lumumba, an operation authorized by out-going US President Dwight D. Eisenhower the year before.

In 1973, the Australian Secret Intelligence Service and the CIA jointly orchestrated the overthrow of Chile's President Salvador Allende.

Over a period of at least five years in the 1970s, a senior officer named Ian George Peacock, who was in the counterespionage unit of Australia's ASIO, stole highly classified intelligence documents that had been shared with Australia and sold them to the Soviet Union. Peacock held the title of supervisor-E (espionage) and had top-secret security clearance. He retired from the ASIO in 1983 and died in 2006.

During the Falklands War in 1982, the United Kingdom received intelligence data from its FVEY allies as well as from third parties like Norway and France.

In 1989, during the Tiananmen Square protests, SIS and the CIA took part in Operation Yellowbird to exfiltrate dissidents from China.

In the aftermath of the Gulf War in 1991, an ASIS technician bugged Kuwaiti government offices for SIS.

=== ECHELON network disclosures (1972–2000) ===
By the end of the 20th century, the FVEY members had developed the ECHELON surveillance network into a global system capable of collecting massive amounts of private and commercial communications including telephone calls, fax, email, and other data traffic. The network's information comes from intercepted communication bearers such as satellite transmissions and public switched telephone networks.

Two of the FVEY information collection mechanisms are the PRISM program and the Upstream collection system. The PRISM program gathers user information from technology firms such as Google, Apple, and Microsoft; while the Upstream system gathers information directly from civilian communications as they travel through infrastructure like fiber cables. The program was first disclosed to the public in 1972 when a former NSA communications analyst reported to Ramparts magazine that the Agency had developed technology that "could crack all Soviet codes".

In a 1988 piece in the New Statesman called "Somebody's listening", Duncan Campbell revealed the existence of ECHELON, an extension of the UKUSA Agreement on global signals intelligence. The story detailed how eavesdropping operations were not only being employed in the interests of 'national security,' but were regularly abused for corporate espionage in the service of US business interests. The piece passed largely unnoticed outside of journalism circles.

In 1996, New Zealand journalist Nicky Hager provided a detailed description of ECHELON in a book titled Secret Power – New Zealand's Role in the International Spy Network. The European Parliament cited the book in a 1998 report titled "An Appraisal of the Technology of Political Control" (PE 168.184). On 16 March 2000, the Parliament called for a resolution on the Five Eyes and its ECHELON surveillance network which would have called for the "complete dismantling of ECHELON".

Three months later, the European Parliament established the Temporary Committee on ECHELON to investigate the ECHELON surveillance network. However, according to a number of European politicians such as Esko Seppänen of Finland, the European Commission hindered these investigations .

In the United States, congressional legislators warned that the ECHELON system could be used to monitor US citizens. On 14 May 2001, the US government cancelled all meetings with the Temporary Committee on ECHELON. According to a BBC report from May 2001, "The US Government still refuses to admit that Echelon even exists."

=== War on terror (since 2001) ===
In the aftermath of the September 11 attacks on the World Trade Center and the Pentagon, Five Eyes members greatly increased their surveillance capabilities as part of the global war on terror.

During the run-up to the Iraq War, the communications of UN weapons inspector Hans Blix were monitored by the Five Eyes. Around the same time, British agents bugged the office of UN Secretary-General Kofi Annan. An NSA memo detailed Five Eyes plans to increase surveillance on the UN delegations of six countries as part of a "dirty tricks" campaign to pressure these six countries to vote in favour of using force against Iraq.

SIS and the CIA formed a surveillance partnership with Libya's leader Muammar Gaddafi to spy on Libyan dissidents in the West in exchange for permission to use Libya as a base for extraordinary renditions.

As of 2010, Five Eyes-affiliated agencies also have access to SIPRNet, the US government's classified version of the Internet.

In 2013, documents leaked by the former NSA contractor Edward Snowden revealed the existence of numerous surveillance programs jointly operated by the Five Eyes. The following list includes several notable examples reported in the media:

- PRISM – Operated by the NSA together with GCHQ and the ASD
- XKeyscore – Operated by the NSA with contributions from the ASD and the GCSB
- Tempora – Operated by GCHQ with contributions from the NSA
- MUSCULAR – Operated by GCHQ and the NSA
- STATEROOM – Operated by the ASD, CIA, CSE, GCHQ, and NSA

In March 2014, the International Court of Justice (ICJ) ordered Australia to seal documents and data seized by ASIO in a raid on the office of East Timor's lawyer, Bernard Collaery. The material related to the Timor Sea Treaty negotiations between East Timor and Australia and included legal documents, electronic files and a statement by a former ASIS agent alleging that Australia eavesdropped on East Timor during negotiations. This was the first time the court had imposed restrictions on the spy agencies of a Five Eyes state.

=== Competition with China (since 2018) ===
On 1 December 2018, Canadian authorities arrested Meng Wanzhou, a Huawei executive, at Vancouver International Airport to face charges of fraud and conspiracy in the United States. China responded by arresting two Canadian nationals. According to the South China Morning Post, analysts saw this conflict as the beginning of a direct clash between China's government and governments of the Five Eyes alliance. In the months that followed, the United States restricted technology exchanges with China. The newspaper reported that these events were seen by Beijing as a "fight ... waged with the world’s oldest intelligence alliance, the Five Eyes."

Starting in 2019, Australian parliamentarians as well as US Secretary of State Mike Pompeo prompted the United Kingdom not to use Huawei technology in its 5G network. In 2021, the UK Government announced it no longer planned to use Huawei's 5G technology.

In November 2020, the Five Eyes alliance criticised China's rules disqualifying elected legislators in Hong Kong.

In mid-April 2021, the New Zealand Foreign Minister Nanaia Mahuta issued a statement that New Zealand would not let the Five Eyes alliance dictate its bilateral relationship with China and that New Zealand was uncomfortable with expanding the remit of the intelligence grouping. In response, the Australian Government expressed concern that Wellington was undermining collective efforts to combat what it regarded as Chinese aggression. New Zealand Prime Minister Jacinda Ardern echoed Mahuta's remarks and said that while New Zealand was still committed to the Five Eyes alliance, it would not use the network as its first point of communication for non-security matters. While The Telegraph's defence editor Con Coughlin and British Conservative Member of Parliament Bob Seely criticised New Zealand for undermining the Five Eyes' efforts to present a united front against Beijing, the Chinese Global Times praised New Zealand for putting its own national interests over the Five Eyes. Following the 2023 New Zealand general election, the new New Zealand Foreign Minister and Deputy Prime Minister Winston Peters promised closer cooperation with Five Eyes partners. According to The Economist and Foreign Policy magazine, New Zealand foreign policy under the new National-led coalition government had shifted away from China in favour of closer relations with its traditional Five Eyes partners. During an interview with The Economist, Prime Minister Christopher Luxon said that he was looking to "diversify New Zealand's diplomatic and trade relationships away from its reliance on China".

In late April 2021, the Global Times reported that China's Ministry of State Security will monitor employees of companies and organisations considered to be at risk of foreign infiltration while they travel to the Five Eyes countries. These employees will be required to report their travel destinations, agendas, and meetings with foreign personnel to Chinese authorities. Other security measures include undergoing "pre-departure spying education", and using different electronic devices while at home and while abroad.

In mid-December 2021, the United States Secretary of State, the Foreign Ministers of Australia, Canada, and New Zealand, and the UK Foreign Secretary issued a joint statement criticising the exclusion of opposition candidates by Hong Kong national security law and urging China to respect human rights and freedoms in Hong Kong in accordance with the Sino-British Joint Declaration. In response, the Chinese Government claimed the Hong Kong elections were fair and criticised the Five Eyes for interfering in Hong Kong's domestic affairs. In June 2026, the Five Eyes issued a joint statement warning about Chinese espionage over online job platforms.

=== 2023 meeting ===
The Five Eyes leaders held their first known public meeting at Stanford University's Hoover Institution in California in the US. They had been meeting privately nearby in Palo Alto. Present were:

- Australia's ASIO Director General Mike Burgess,
- Canada's CSIS head David Vigneault,
- New Zealand's NZSIS Director General Andrew Hampton,
- the UK's Director General of MI5 Ken McCallum, and
- the US's FBI Director Christopher Wray.

They made public statements on topics such as the death in Canada of Hardeep Singh Nijjar and Chinese state-backed hackers.

== Domestic espionage sharing controversy ==
The Five Eyes alliance is sort of an artifact of the post World War II era where the Anglophone countries are the major powers banded together to sort of co-operate and share the costs of intelligence gathering infrastructure. ... The result of this was over decades and decades some sort of a supra-national intelligence organisation that doesn't answer to the laws of its own countries.

— Edward Snowden

One of the Five Eyes' core principles is that members do not spy on other governments in the alliance. US Director of National Intelligence Admiral Dennis C. Blair said in 2013, "We do not spy on each other. We just ask."

However, in recent years, FVEY documents have shown that member agencies are intentionally spying on one another's private citizens and sharing the collected information with each other. Shami Chakrabarti, director of the advocacy group Liberty, wrote that the FVEY alliance increases the ability of member states to "subcontract their dirty work" to each other. FVEY countries maintain that all intelligence sharing is done legally, according to the domestic law of the respective nations.

As a result of Snowden's disclosures, the FVEY alliance has become the subject of a growing amount of controversy in parts of the world:

- In late 2013, Canadian federal judge Richard Mosley strongly rebuked the CSIS for outsourcing its surveillance of Canadians to overseas partner agencies. A 51-page court ruling asserts that the CSIS and other Canadian federal agencies have been illegally enlisting FVEY allies in global surveillance dragnets, while keeping domestic federal courts in the dark.
- In 2014, New Zealand's Parliament asked the NZSIS and the GCSB if they had received any monetary contributions from members of the FVEY alliance. Neither agency responded to these inquiries, instead stating that they do not collect metadata on New Zealanders. David Cunliffe, leader of the Labour Party, asserted that the public is entitled to be informed of foreign funding if the disclosure does not compromise the agencies' operations.
- In early 2014, the European Parliament's Committee on Civil Liberties, Justice and Home Affairs released a report that confirmed that the intelligence agencies of New Zealand and Canada have cooperated with the NSA under the Five Eyes programme and may have been actively sharing the personal data of EU citizens. The EU report did not investigate if any international or domestic US laws were broken by the US and did not claim that any FVEY nation was illegally conducting intelligence collection on the EU. The NSA maintains that any intelligence collection done on the EU was in accordance with domestic US law and international law.
- In 2013, the British Parliament's Intelligence and Security Committee (ISC) conducted an investigation and concluded that the GCHQ had broken no domestic British laws in its use of data gathered through the NSA's PRISM. According to the ISC report, The GCHQ provided documents which "conformed with GCHQ's statutory duties" and authority as established by the Intelligence Services Act 1994. Requests made to the US corresponded with extant warrants for interception in accordance with the Regulation of Investigatory Powers Act 2000. The ISC also questioned whether the UK's legal framework was sufficient.
- As of April 2024, no court case has been brought against any US intelligence community member claiming that they went around US domestic law by soliciting foreign countries to spy on US citizens and give that intelligence to the US. This may change as attention is paid to the anticipated public releases regarding Operation Lobos 1, Operation Trojan Shield, and Project Habitance. These operations received information from foreign governments for spying on US citizens. The FBI did initiate Operation Trojan Shield, which was illegal in the US and so relied on the Australian government. Seventeen U.S. citizens have been charged in U.S. federal court between 2021 and 2024, but none of the cases as of April 2024 had proceeded past the initial pretrial stages.

== Other international cooperatives ==
Beginning with its founding by the United States and United Kingdom in 1946, the alliance expanded twice, inducting Canada in 1948 and Australia and New Zealand in 1956, establishing the Five Eyes as it is today. Additionally, there are nations termed "Third Party Partners" that share their intelligence with the Five Eyes despite not being formal members. While the Five Eyes is rooted in a particular agreement with specific operations among the five nations, similar sharing agreements have been set up independently and for specific purposes; for example, according to Edward Snowden, the NSA has a "massive body" called the Foreign Affairs Directorate dedicated to partnering with foreign countries beyond the alliance.

=== Six Eyes (proposed) – Israel, Singapore, South Korea, Japan ===
Several countries have been prospective members of the Five Eyes including Israel, South Korea and Japan, that have collaborated with FVEY.

NSA whistleblower Edward Snowden leaked documents from the NSA that showed Singapore, one of the world's biggest digital telecommunications hubs, is a key "third party" working with the "Five Eyes" intelligence partners, and continue to collaborate intensively with the alliance, though Singapore, Israel, South Korea and Japan are formally non-members.

According to French news magazine L'Obs, in 2009, the United States propositioned France to join the treaty and form a subsequent "Six Eyes" alliance. The French President at the time, Nicolas Sarkozy, requested that France have the same status as the other members, including the signing of a "no-spy agreement". This proposal was approved by the director of the NSA, but rejected by the director of the CIA and by President Barack Obama, resulting in a refusal from France.

New York magazine reported in 2013 that Germany was interested in joining the Five Eyes alliance. At the time, several members of the United States Congress, including Tim Ryan and Charles Dent, were pushing for Germany's entry to the Five Eyes alliance.

=== Five Eyes Plus ===
As of 2018 through an initiative sometimes termed "Five Eyes Plus 3", Five Eyes has agreements with France, Germany, and Japan to introduce an information-sharing framework to counter China and Russia. Five Eyes plus France, Japan and South Korea share information about North Korea's military activities, including ballistic missiles, in an arrangement sometimes dubbed "Five Eyes Plus".

=== Nine Eyes ===
A map of the Nine Eyes countries

The Nine Eyes is a different group that consists of the Five Eyes members as well as Denmark, France, the Netherlands, and Norway.

=== Fourteen Eyes ===
A map of the Fourteen Eyes countries

According to a document leaked by Edward Snowden, there is another working agreement among 14 nations officially known as "SIGINT Seniors Europe", or "SSEUR". This "14 Eyes" group consists of the Nine Eyes members plus Belgium, Germany, Italy, Spain, and Sweden.

=== Further intelligence sharing collaborations ===
As Privacy International explains, there are a number of issue-specific intelligence agreements that include some or all of the above nations and numerous others, such as:

- An area-specific sharing agreement among 41 nations including the 14 Eyes and the international coalition in Afghanistan.
- A "focused cooperation" on computer network exploitation between the Five Eyes nations and Austria, Belgium, Czechia, Denmark, Germany, Greece, Hungary, Iceland, Italy, Japan, Luxembourg, the Netherlands, Norway, Poland, Portugal, South Korea, Spain, Sweden, Switzerland, and Turkey.
- The Club de Berne with 17, primarily European members.
- The Counterterrorist Group, a wider membership than the 17 European states that make up the Club of Berne, including the United States.
- The NATO Special Committee made up of the heads of the security services of NATO's 32 member countries.

== See also ==
- ABCANZ Armies
- Air and Space Interoperability Council (air forces)
- Allied technological cooperation during World War II
- Anglosphere
- ANZUS — Trilateral security pact between Australia, New Zealand, and the United States
- AUKUS — Trilateral security partnership between Australia, the United Kingdom, and the United States
- AUSCANNZUKUS (navies)
- Border Five
- CANZUK
- Combined Communications-Electronics Board (communication-electronics)
- Club de Berne
- Five Nations Passport Group
- Maximator — an intelligence alliance between Denmark, Germany, France, the Netherlands, and Sweden.
- Migration 5
- Quadrilateral Security Dialogue (Quad) — Strategic dialogue among Australia, India, Japan and US
- The Technical Cooperation Program (technology and science)
- Tizard Mission
- National Geospatial-Intelligence Agency

=== International relations ===
- Australia–Canada relations
- Australia–New Zealand relations
- Australia–United Kingdom relations
- Australia–United States relations
- Canada–New Zealand relations
- Canada–United Kingdom relations
- Canada–United States relations
- New Zealand–United Kingdom relations
- New Zealand–United States relations
- United Kingdom–United States relations
