= DDIS =

DDIS may refer to:

- Directorate of Defence Intelligence and Security, New Zealander intelligence agency
- Danish Defence Intelligence Service, Danish foreign and military intelligence agency
