= Allied Communications Publications =

Documents that define communication procedures for the armed forces of CCEB and NATO

Allied Communications Publications are documents developed by the Combined Communications-Electronics Board and NATO, which define the procedures for communicating in computer messaging, radiotelephony, radiotelegraph, radioteletype (RATT), air-to-ground signalling (panel signalling), and other forms of communications used by the armed forces of the five CCEB member countries and/or NATO.

Allied Communications Publications
						Revision											
Short Title	Full Title	Developer	Description	Status	Original	1	2	3	4	5	6	7	8	9	10	11	Other
ACP 100	Allied Callsign and Address Group System: Instructions and Assignments						B (March 1972)	C (August 1974)	D (March, 1978)	E (May, 1981)	F (March, 1984)					K	L, M
ACP 100 (SEATO SUPP-1)	SEATO Call Sign and Address Group Assignments													I (Apr 1979)			
ACP 100 (US SUPP-1)	U. S. Call Sign and Address Group System - Instructions and Assignments (U)							C							J (Oct 1980)	K (Aug 1981)	
ACP 101	Air Force Address Groups																
ACP 102	Army Address Groups																
ACP 103	Naval Address Groups																
ACP 104	Allied, Joint and Geographical Address Groups																
ACP 105	Master Index of Four Letter Call Signs and Address Groups																
ACP 110	Tactical Call Sign Book (U)																
ACP 110 USN SUPP-1	U.S. Naval Tactical Call Sign Book for Aircraft				Apr 1960	A (Aug 1969)	B (Sep 1972)										
ACP 112	Task Organization Call Sign Book		Designed to facilitate communications with and between the Task Forces, Elements, Groups and Units comprising the NATO Naval Task Organization.			A	B (Apr 1961)										
ACP 113	Automation of List-Type Communication, Publication Call Sign Book for Ships	CCEB	Contains a list of International Call Signs for Ships.														P, Q, R, S, T, U V, W, X, Y, Z, AA, AC, AH
ACP 114	Call Sign Book for Fixed and Land Radio Stations																
ACP 116	Address Group Book																
ACP 117	Allied Routing Indicator Book																
ACP 117 COMNAV SUPP-1	Allied Routing Indicator Book Commonwealth Naval supplement No. 1				Mar, 1967												
ACP 117 (US SUPP-1)	Allied Routing Indicator Book (U)																
ACP 117 (US SUPP-2)	Routing Indicator Book for Mobile Commands and Units (U)																
ACP 117 (US SUPP-3)	Defense Communications System Routing Doctrine General Purpose Networks (U)																
ACP 117 (US SUPP-4)	US Special Purpose Routing Indicator Book (U)																
ACP 117 (US SUPP-5)	CONUS Military TWX/Telex Directory (U)																
ACP 117 (CAN-US SUPP-1)	Allied Routing Indicator Book--Canada–United States Supplement No. 1(U)																
ACP 118	Visual Call Sign Book								D (Feb 1954)	E (Apr 1967)							
ACP 119	SEATO Voice Call Sips for Tactical Aircraft (SEATO supplement NO. 1)				May 1969												
ACP 120	Common Security Protocol (CSP)	CCEB		Frozen	1998												
ACP 121	Communications Instructions - General	CCEB	Background, Punctuation abbreviations; phonetic spelling; MINIMIZE in emergencies; lettered time zones. Contains information regarding assignments and use of frequencies; means of communications; message preparation; call signs, routing indicators and address groups and method of determining code speeds, message precedence, etc. ACP 121 is primarily for use by originators and communications officers.	In-Force								G	H	I			
ACP 121 (US SUPP-1)	Communication Instructions--General (U)						C										
ACP 121 (NATO SUPP-1) (R)	Communication Instructions General NATO Basegram System (U)																
ACP 122	Information Assurance for Allied Communications and Information Systems	CCEB	Contains instructions regarding censorship, handling of classified material, cryptographic operation, transmission security, traffic analysis and deception.									G					
ACP 123	Common Message Strategy and Procedures	CCEB	X.400 messages/Military Message Handling System				B										
ACP 124	Communication Instructions Radiotelegraph Procedure		Covers radio net procedures				B (Jan 1957)	C (Jul 1969)	D								
ACP 125	Communication Instructions Radiotelephone ... procedures	CCEB	Main English-language document for radio voice communications procedures. Accuracy methods; definition of prowords; plain language radio check; Discipline; Messages; Operating Rules; Misc methods (sync time; grid references)	In-Force					D (Jul 1970)		F	G					
ACP 125 U.S. SUPP-1	HF Air-Ground Radiotelephone Procedures U.S. Supplement 1 to ACP 125 (B)				Sep 1958												
ACP 125 (US SUPP-2)	Radiotelephone Procedures for the Conduct of Artillery and Naval Gunfire (U)		See also ATP 4 Allied Spotting Procedure for Naval Gunfire Support.			A (Feb 1984)											
ACP 126	Communications Instructions - Teletypewriter (Teleprinter) Instructions.	CCEB	ACP 126(C) is now withdrawn from publication. This copy is retained for reference only. JAFPUB 2016-49 refers.	Withdrawn 2016-10-20				C									
ACP 127	Communications Instructions - Tape Relay Procedures.	CCEB		In-Force but Frozen								G					
ACP 127 Supp-1	Communications Instructions – Procedures for Allied Fleet RATT Operations.	CCEB														K	
ACP 128	Allied Telecommunications Record System (ALTERS) Operating Procedures	CCEB				A											
ACP 129	Communication Instructions - Visual Signaling Procedures (U)	CCEB					B (Feb 1965)										
ACP 129 NS-1	Communication Instructions Visual Signaling Procedures				Initial												
ACP 130	Communications Instructions - Direction Finding (D/F) Procedure																
ACP 130	Communications Instructions Signalling Procedures in the Visual Medium.		For emergency communications. Semaphore; Flaghoist; Sound; Infrared Comms; Panel signalling; Marking of drop zones; emergency signals; pyrotechnics; Combines ACP-129 and ACP-168	In-Force		A											
ACP 131	Communications Instructions - Operating Signals.	CCEB	Morse Code Q-Codes, etc. 1964 version has 3x9 radio check	In-Force			B		D (May 1986)		F						
ACP 133	Common Directory Services and Procedures	CCEB															
ACP 133 SUPP-1	Communications Instructions: Common Directory Services and Procedures Supplement	CCEB				A											
ACP 134	Telephone Switchboard Operating Procedures (U)																
ACP 134 NS-1	Telephone Switchboard Operating Procedure																
ACP 135	Communications Instructions - Distress and Rescue Procedures.	CCEB		In-Force							F						
ACP 136	Communication Instructions--Panel Signaling (U)		Contains a system whereby ground personnel may communicate to a limited degree with aircraft by means of panels laid out on the ground, or by markings in the soil.														
ACP 137	Pegasus Directory Services Technical Architecture	CCEB				A											
ACP 142	A Protocol for Reliable Multicast Messaging in Bandwidth Constrained and Delayed Acknowledgement (EMCON) Environments.	CCEB															
ACP 145	Gateway-to-Gateway Implementation Guide for ACP 123/STANAG 4406 Messaging Services.	CCEB															
ACP 147	Call Sign Book for Merchant Ships in Time of War						B							I (Oct 1966)	J (Nov 1967)	K (Jun 1969)	L (May 1970), M (Mar 1975), N (Dec 1975), P (Dec 1978), R (Oct 1980)
ACP 148	Wartime Instructions for Merchant Ships (Visual Signaling and Tactics)		A handbook for convoy and independent ship operation and a guide to convoy maneuvering and signalling procedure.		Dec 1959	A (Dec 1959)											
ACP 149	Wartime Instructions for Merchant Ships (Radio)		Contains instructions for the conduct of radio communications with and within merchant ship convoys.			A (Feb 1965)											
ACP 149 NATO SUPP-1	Wartime Instructions for Merchant Ships (Radio)				Jun 1958												
ACP 149 SEAT0 SWP-1	Wartime Instructions for Merchant Ships (Radio)							C (Feb 1965)									
ACP 149 SWP-1	Wartime Instructions for Merchant Ships (Radio)				Feb 1965												
ACP 150	Recognition and Identification Instructions - Air, Land and Sea Forces.		Contains a general description of the scope, objectives, application, limitation, means and methods of recognition and identification with instructions regarding their use.						D								
ACP 151	Recognition and Identification Instructions		Contains instructions regarding employment of visual and electronic means of recognition and identification of air and ground forces.		A												
ACP 152	Recognition and Identification Instructions - Ground Forces																
ACP 153	Recognition and Identification Instructions - Surface Forces		Contains instructions regarding the employment of visual and electronic means of recognition and identification of surface warships, merchant ships, between submarines and surface warships and between submarines and aircraft.														
ACP 154	Recognition and Identification Instructions - Harbour Entrance Control		Contains instructions regarding the responsibility and procedure for identifying major warships, minor warships and merchant ships entering defended ports.														
ACP 155	Recognition and Identification Instructions - Key List No.1 - Basic Key List																
ACP 156	Recognition and Identification Instructions - Key List No.2 - Air-Ship-Ground																
ACP 157	Recognition and Identification Instructions - Key List No.3 - Merchant Vessels																
ACP 158	Recognition and Identification Instructions - Book of Numbered Index Columns																
ACP 160	IFF/SIF Operating Procedures	CCEB															
ACP 165	Operational Brevity Codes		Contains radiotelephone procedure, prowords and operational brevity codes for Air Warning, Air Defense, Anti-aircraft Coordination, Airborne Early Warning and Electronic Countermeasures.				B (Apr 1965)		D (Dec 1977)								
ACP 166	Voice Procedure for Ground Controlled Approach		Contains instructions on Ground Control Approach and standard voice phraseology for use in connection with Ground Control Approach procedure.														
ACP 167	Glossary of Communications-Electronic Terms.	CCEB					B (May 1965)	C (Feb 1971)	D (Feb 1973)		F (Aug 1981)		H	I			
ACP 168	Pyrotechnic Signals (U)		Combined into ACP 130			A		C (Jul 1979)									
ACP 175	Allied Naval Signal Book																
ACP 176	Allied Naval and Maritime Air Communications Instructions		Updated version?					C (Aug 1964)									
ACP 176 NATO SUPP-1	Allied Naval and Maritime Air Communication Instructions					A Apr 1967)											
ACP 176 NATO SUPP-2	NATO Naval and Maritime Air Radio Organization																
ACP 177	Land Forces Electronic Warfare Instructions.			Frozen													
ACP 178	Maritime Electronic Warfare Instructions.			Frozen													
ACP 179	Maritime Electronic Warfare Instructions Air Forces				Oct 1965												
ACP 180	Electronic Warfare. - Draft																
ACP 185	Public Key Infrastructure (PKI) Cross-Certification Between Combined Communications-Electronics Board (CCEB) Nations	CCEB		Published		A											
ACP 190	Guide to Spectrum Management in Military Operations	CCEB		Published	Oct 1958												
ACP 190 (US SUPP-1)	Guide to Frequency Planning (U)				Feb 1963												
ACP 191	Ionospheric Sounder Operations																
ACP 193	A Ground Routing Protocol (GRP) for use with Automatic Link Establishment (ALE) Capable HF Radios.	CCEB				A											
ACP 194	Policy for the Coordination of Radio Frequency Allocations and Assignments between Cooperating Nations	CCEB															
ACP 198	Instructions for the preparation of Allied Communications Publications	CCEB	Establishes a standard format for ACPs, including rules for assignment of short titles, preparation, assembly, and pagination.														
ACP 200	Allied Maritime Tactical Wide Area Networking																
ACP 200.V1	Maritime and Mobile Tacticalwide Area networking (MTWAN) in the Maritime Environment: Operating Guidance	CCEB							D								
ACP 200.V2	Maritime and Mobile Tactical Wide Area Networking (MTWAN): Tactical Guidance	CCEB							D								
ACP 201	Communications Instructions Internet Protocol (IP) Services	CCEB				A											
ACP 220	Multi National Videoconferencing Services	CCEB															
ACP 230	Pegasus Service Operations Management Framework (PSOM)	CCEB				A											
ACP 256	Operations Code and Prearranged Message Codes																
ACP 257	Map Reference and Numbered Cryptosystems																

== See also ==
- Allied Communication Procedures
