= US Military Communications-Electronics Board =

The US Military Communications-Electronics Board (abbreviated MCEB or USMCEB) is an element of the United States Department of Defense, which is responsive to both the US Secretary of Defense and the Joint Chiefs of Staff. One of its roles is to develop Allied Communications Publications, which are then submitted to the Combined Communications-Electronics Board for approval.

== See also ==
- United States Army Communications-Electronics Command
