= Migration 5 =

Conference of the immigration authorities for English-speaking countries

Migration 5 (M5, formerly the Five Country Conference on migration) is a conference of the immigration authorities of Australia, Canada, New Zealand, the United Kingdom, and the United States of America. The five countries work together to "enhance the integrity, security and efficiency of their immigration and border services" including the sharing of certain overseas visa application centres.

In 2009, the Five Country Conference agreed to a data-sharing protocol which facilitates the sharing of the biometric data of up to 3000 people per year in order to assist with asylum applications. The data-sharing among M5 members subsequently expanded to also cover the personal data of any traveller, visitor or migrant, across 35 items of information including an applicant’s family members, medical history and travel records. A Radio New Zealand investigation found that up to 8 million checks for such personal data happen among M5 members each year, with no M5-wide restrictions on data retention.

The respective authorities are:

- Australia: Department of Home Affairs
- Canada: Immigration, Refugees and Citizenship Canada and the Canada Border Services Agency
- New Zealand: Immigration New Zealand
- United Kingdom: Home Office
- United States: Department of Homeland Security

== See also ==
- Anglosphere
- Border Five
- CANZUK
- Five Eyes
- Five Nations Passport Group
