= AUSCANNZUKUS =

Military command agreement

AUSCANNZUKUS member states

AUSCANNZUKUS is an abbreviation for the naval Command, Control, Communications and Computers (C4) interoperability organization involving the Anglosphere nations of Australia, Canada, New Zealand, the United Kingdom, and the United States. It is also used as a security caveat in the UKUSA Community, where it is also known as "Five Eyes."

== Objectives, strategies and guiding principles ==
The organization's vision and mission, objectives, strategies and guiding principles, and Structure are presented on the AUSCANNZUKUS Information Portal.

=== Objectives ===
1. To achieve internal sharing and understanding of Maritime C4 knowledge.
2. To produce products and processes to achieve Maritime C4 interoperability.
3. To increase external sharing and understanding of AUSCANNZUKUS.

=== Strategies ===
1. Establish C4 policy and standards.
2. Identify C4 interoperability requirements and risks.
3. Identify, develop and utilize new technologies.
4. Exchange information on national C4 capabilities, plans, and projects.
5. To improve national awareness of AUSCANNZUKUS.
6. Leverage exercises, experiments and demonstrations to deliver capability.
7. Inform and influence multi national defence fora.

=== Guiding principles ===
1. The focus of all activities is to be on the requirements of the naval warfighter.
2. All knowledge-sharing initiatives are to aim at providing innovative options, which are affordable to all AUSCANNZUKUS navies.
3. All relevant information is to be shared with appropriate joint and combined organizations.

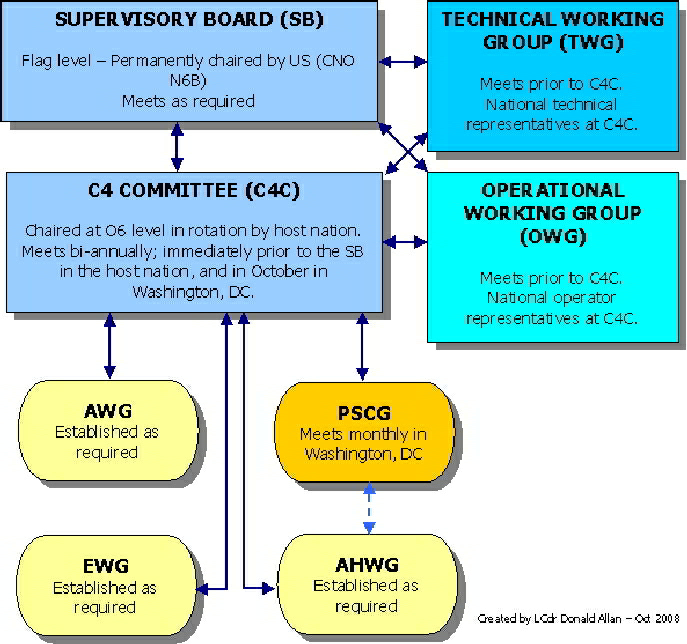
AUSCANZUKUS structure.

== Structure ==
The current AUSCANNZUKUS organization consists of the supervisory board, C4 Committee, and various other subordinate groups.

== History ==
Early in World War II communications interoperability between Allied forces was poor. During March 1941 the first high-level proposals to formally structure combined operations between the United States and the United Kingdom were considered; these discussions were the genesis of the current Combined Communications Electronics Board (CCEB).

The origins of the AUSCANNZUKUS organization arose from dialogue between Admiral Arleigh Burke, USN, and Admiral Lord Louis Mountbatten, RN, in 1960. Their intention was to align naval communications policies and prevent, or at least limit, any barriers to interoperability, with the imminent introduction of sophisticated new communications equipment. AUSCANNZUKUS matured to the current five-nation organization in 1980 when New Zealand became a full member.

The organization's remit has expanded over the years, and its mission now includes fostering knowledge sharing and C4 interoperability between the navies of the five nations in order to increase operational effectiveness.

== Related organisations ==
AUSCANNZUKUS liaises closely with Washington-based management groups of the Combined Communications Electronics Board (CCEB), Multinational Interoperability Council (MIC), American, British, Canadian, Australian and New Zealand Armies' Interoperability Program (ABCANZ Armies), Air and Space Interoperability Council (ASIC (Air Force)) and The Technical Cooperation Program (TTCP).

== See also ==
- ABCANZ Armies
- Air and Space Interoperability Council (air forces)
- Allied technological cooperation during World War II
- AUKUS
- ANZUS
- CANZUK
- Combined Communications Electronics Board (communication-electronics)
- Commonwealth of Nations
- Five Eyes (intelligence)
- The Technical Cooperation Program (technology and science)
- Tizard Mission
- UKUSA Agreement (signal intelligence)
