= ACP 125 =

Short name for Allied Communications Publication 125

ACP 125 is the short name for Allied Communications Publication 125: Communications Instructions—Radiotelephone Procedures, developed and published by the Combined Communications Electronics Board, for use by the Five Eyes nations and the rest of NATO. According to the latest version,

"The aim of ACP 125 is to prescribe the voice procedure for use by the armed forces of Allied nations on secure and non-secure tactical voice nets. Its purpose is to provide a standardized way of passing speech and data traffic as securely as possible consistent with accuracy, speed and the needs of command and control."

The standard defines the procedures for communicating by voice over two-way radio, and has served as the basis for radio communications procedures for many non-military organizations, as well as numerous U.S. government organizations, including the United States Department of State and the Civil Air Patrol.

First published as ACP 125(A) in about 1951, the current version is ACP 125(G), published in 2016. The standard itself is ACP 125, with the letter in parentheses indicating the major revision level. There are at least two supplements, including:

- ACP 125 U.S. SUPP-1: HF Air-Ground Radiotelephone Procedures U.S. Supplement 1 to ACP 125(B)
- ACP 125 (US SUPP-2): Radiotelephone Procedures for the Conduct of Artillery and Naval Gunfire (U)

== International use ==
Although the standard is designed for use by all NATO countries, especially when operating in conjunction with each other, some efforts have been made in the past to translate the procedure words into the native language of member countries. For example, NATO memo SGM-623-56 from 1956, French Equivalents to English Expressions Used in ACP 125(B), includes the following table of prowords:

Equivalent Prowords
English	French
ACTION	ACTION
ALL AFTER	TOUT APRES
ALL BEFORE	TOUT AVANT
BREAK	SEPARATION
CORRECTION	CORRECTION
DISREGARD THIS TRANSMISSION	ANNULEZ CETTE TRANSMISSION
DO NOT ANSWER	NE REPONDEZ PAS
EXECUTE	EXECUTEZ
EXECUTE TO FOLLOW	PREPAREZ-VOUS A EXECUTER
EXEMPT	EXCEPTE
FIGURES	CHIFFRES
GROUPS	GROUPES
INFO	INFO
I READ BACK	JE COLLATIONNE
I SAY AGAIN	JE REPETE
I SPELL	J'EPELLE
I VERIFY	VERIFICATION
MESSAGE FOLLOWS	PRENEZ MESSAGE
NUMBER	NUMERO
ORIGINATOR	ORIGINE
OUT	TERMINE
OVER	PARLEZ
READ BACK	COLLATIONNEZ
RELAY (TO)	TRANSMETTEZ (A)
ROGER	RECU
SAY AGAIN	REPETEZ
SILENCE	SILENCE
SILENCE LIFTED	SILENCE SUSPENDU
SPEAK SLOWER	PARLEZ LENTEMENT
THAT IS CORRECT	CORRECT
THIS IS	ICI
TIME	GROUPE HORAIRE
UNKNOWN STATION	STATION INCONNUE
VERIFY	VERIFIEZ
WAIT	ATTENDEZ
WAIT OUT	ATTENDEZ TERMINE
WILCO	APERCU
WORD AFTER	LE MOT APRES
WORD BEFORE	LE MOT AVANT
WORDS TWICE	LES MOTS DEUX FOIS
WRONG	ERREUR

== See also ==
- ACP 131
