= Border Five =

International customs and border management forum

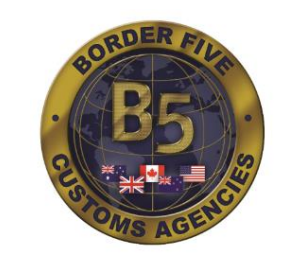
Logo of the Border Five Customs Agencies Group

Border Five (Border 5; B5) is an informal forum on customs and border management policy issues with participation from Australia, Canada, New Zealand, the United Kingdom and the United States. The participating authorities are:

- (Australia) Australian Border Force of Department of Home Affairs
- Canada Border Services Agency
- New Zealand Customs Service
- (United Kingdom) UK Border Force of Home Office
- (United States) U.S. Customs and Border Protection of Department of Homeland Security

== See also ==
- Anglosphere
- CANZUK
- Five Eyes
- Five Nations Passport Group
- Migration 5
