= Combined Communications-Electronics Board =

Joint military communications organisation

The Combined Communications-Electronics Board (CCEB) is a five-nation joint military communications-electronics (C-E) organisation whose mission is the coordination of any military C-E matter that is referred to it by a member nation. The member nations of the CCEB are Australia, Canada, New Zealand, the United Kingdom, and the United States. The CCEB is the Sponsoring Authority for all Allied Communications Publications (ACPs). ACPs are raised and issued under common agreement between the member nations. The CCEB Board consists of a senior Command, Control, Communications and Computer (C4) representative from each of the member nations.

The goal of the CCEB is to enhance the interoperability of communications systems among the military forces of the ABCA countries. The CCEB directs the activities of subordinate working groups charged with exchanging operational, procedural, and technical information in defined areas. CCEB products include Allied Communications Publications, Information Exchange Action Items, and CCEB publications. The U.S. CCEB representative is the Joint Chiefs of Staff Director for C4 Systems (J-6). The U.S. Army provides technical representatives to selected CCEB working groups at the request of the U.S. CCEB representative.

The CCEB is a member to the Washington-based Multifora consisting of, but not limited to, ABCA Armies, AUSCANNZUKUS, and The Technical Cooperation Program. In the U.S., the Military Command, Control, Communications, and Computers Executive Board (MC4EB) serves as the principal member to the CCEB.

== History ==
The Combined Communications Board (CCB) was established in 1941 based on high-level proposals for a structure to formulate combined communications-electronics policy. The Australia, New Zealand, and Canada. The CCB grew to 33 sub-committees established to consider all communication specialist areas. The CCB produced all combined communications-electronics publications used by the member nations. It also produced more than two million additional copies, in 12 languages, for use by CCB allies. CCB efforts continued after the war until 14 October 1949 when it was reduced in size and commitment with the formation of the North Atlantic Treaty Organization (NATO) and dissolution of the Combined Chiefs of Staff organization. The United Kingdom Joint Communications Staff, Washington, and the United States Joint Communications-Electronics Committee continued to meet on a regular basis as the US-UK Joint Communications-Electronics Committee with representatives of Australia, Canada, and New Zealand attending as appropriate.

Canada became a full CCB member in 1951, Australia in 1969, and finally New Zealand in 1972 when the organization was renamed the Combined Communications-Electronics Board (CCEB). In 1986, the CCEB broadened its scope to include communication and information systems in support of command and control. CCEB interoperability activities have always been coordinated with NATO and the US Military Communications Electronics Board (MCEB). Increased focus on coalition C4 interoperability to maximize coalition warfighter effectiveness led to a close relationship with the Multinational Interoperability Council (MIC). Under a Statement of Cooperation the MIC supports the CCEB as the lead coordinator for multinational C4 interoperability, and the CCEB supports the MIC in its role of leading the development of Joint/Combined doctrine and defining Warfighter C4 requirements.

Timeline of official names and member countries
Year	Name	Member Nations	Notes
1942	Combined Communications Board	UK, USA	Formed during World War II
1951		CAN, UK, USA	Canada joins as a full member
1969		AUS, CAN, UK, USA	Australia joins as a full member
1972	Combined Communications-Electronics Board	AUS, CAN, NZL, UK, USA	New Zealand joins as a full member

== Allied Communications Publications ==
The CCEB develops and publishes the communications procedures for use in computer messaging, radiotelephony, radiotelegraph, radioteletype (RATT), air-to-ground signalling (panel signalling), and other forms of communications used by the armed forces of the five member countries.

Not all ACPs are managed by the CCEB, some are managed by the NATO Standardization Office.

== Allied Communication Procedures ==
A subset of the CCEB's ACP documents constitutes the communication procedures for the CCEB member nations (all of whom have English as their official language) and as the basis for communication procedures of all NATO members, who will develop procedures documents in their local languages. The most well-known of these, especially outside of military organizations, is ACP 125: Communications Instructions—Radiotelephony Procedures.

== See also ==
- ABCA Armies
- Air and Space Interoperability Council (air forces)
- AUSCANNZUKUS (navies)
- CANZUK
- Five Eyes
- The Technical Cooperation Program (communication-electronics)
- UKUSA Agreement (signal intelligence)
- US Military Communications-Electronics Board
