= Michael Kenny (political scientist) =

Professor of public policy

Michael Kenny is professor of public policy at the University of Cambridge. Kenny was the first director of the Mile End Institute and sits on the Leverhulme Trust's advisory committee. He is co-director of the British Academy's "Governing England" programme, and is a member of the expert panel set up by the Scottish Parliament to advise on the constitutional implications of Brexit.
