= Five Eyes Air Force Interoperability Council =

Military organisation consisting of the Five Eyes countries

The Five Eyes Air Force Interoperability Council (AFIC) is a formal military organisation, consisting of the "Five Eyes" countries, Australia, Canada, New Zealand, the United Kingdom and United States. The organisation is responsible for enhancing Air Force interoperability amongst member nations' Air Forces. The use of the term "Five Eyes" stems from the informal name for the intelligence sharing network consisting of Australia, Canada, New Zealand, United Kingdom and United States.

It was previously known as the Air and Space Interoperability Council (ASIC) and the Air Standardization Coordinating Committee (ASCC).

== History ==
In 1948, following the end of World War II, the Air Standards Coordination Committee (ASCC) was formed by the Air Force Chiefs of Staff of Canada, the United Kingdom and the United States to further those nations' capabilities to conduct combined air operations and to provide each other with certain essential services, namely the capability for aircraft to be cross-serviced. In 1951, ASCC was expanded to include the US Navy, the Royal Australian Air Force joined in 1964 and the Royal New Zealand Air Force followed in 1965.

Perhaps the most prominent role of ASCC/AFIC has been the creation and maintenance of the reporting names for aircraft from the Soviet Union/Russia, other Warsaw Pact countries and the People's Republic of China. These reporting names are used by the militaries of NATO and other members of the broader western alliance.

An external review of ASCC was undertaken in 2004 to examine the organisational processes and structures. As a result of this review, in 2005, ASCC was restructured, downsized and renamed the "Air and Space Interoperability Council" (ASIC).

In 2016 the Air Chiefs of the "Five Eyes" nations recommended that in order to increase ASIC’s operational relevance, it should refresh its principles, refocus its activities, and consider updating its name. Following this review, in 2017, ASIC realigned itself to concentrate on Air Force interoperability and changed its name to the "Five Eyes Air Force Interoperability Council" (AFIC).

== Operations ==
The "Five Eyes" AFIC identifies and resolves current and future air force interoperability challenges by leveraging collective expertise. In a nutshell, AFIC enhances "Five Eyes" air power by delivering improved air force interoperability.

AFIC does this by facilitating working groups to address identified interoperability friction in "Five Eyes" air operations. These working groups seek to generate mutually agreed "Air Standards" (AIRSTDS) which can be applied to "Five Eyes" Air Forces' operations and incorporated into National air publications and doctrine.

Additionally, AFIC shares information on "Five Eyes" tactics, training and procedures (TTPs) through "Information Publications"; facilitates the loaning of equipment and materiel between nations for test and evaluation purposes; and, provides a management architecture to orchestrate stakeholder participation and deliver organisational outcomes.

== AFIC management structure ==
The AFIC management structure consists of a four-tiered system. "National Directors" (ND) are appointed at the 1 or 2-star officer level from each member nation. These NDs provide the strategic direction to the organisation and authorise the annual tasking and lines of operation for the Council. Additionally, these NDs will serve for 1-year as Chairperson, which rotates annually amongst the member nations.

A Pentagon-based "Management Committee" (MC) oversees the day-to-day operation and performs the AFIC's management functions by implementing the mutually agreed strategic direction, chairing working groups and acting as the primary conduit between the Council's operational tiers. The MC is typically established at the O-5 (OF4) level by representatives from each member nation, usually on a 3-year assignment.

"Working Groups" (WGs) are established across warfighting and supporting functional areas to provide an operator-level approach to improve "Five Eyes" interoperability. Nations appoint a "Head of Delegation" (HoD) who represents their interests within the WG, in addition to various "Subject Matter Experts" (SMEs) who help to tackle the specific interoperability issues that have been identified.

Finally, each nation has a "National Program Manager" (NPM) who is responsible to their respective ND for their own national AFIC program, and coordinating their HoD and SME support to the Working Groups. They also provide administrative support to the ND and MC representative from within their respective nation.

== Current AFIC working groups ==
- Agile Combat Support (ACS). ACS provides the essential capabilities and functions to establish, operate, sustain and close an airbase. The ACS WG focusses on "Five Eyes" interoperability for expeditionary and agile airfield operations; combined basing operations; and support to future capabilities such as Agile Combat Employment (ACE).
- Air Mobility (AM). AM is the movement of personnel, equipment and materiel, by air, both inter and intra-theatre. The AM WG focuses on "Five Eyes" interoperability across a range of Air Mobility roles, including: air transport, aeromedical evacuation, air drop (both cargo and personnel) and air-to-air refueling operations.
- Aerospace Medicine (ASM). ASM encompasses all aspects of aviation medicine by promoting information exchange and developing/maintaining standards. The ASM WG focuses on "Five Eyes" interoperability for aeromedical evacuation, aerospace medical personnel (credentials/training), air mission support (aircrew protection/training), and human performance.
- Airworthiness (Aw). The mandate of the Aw WG is to ensure "Five Eyes" air operations are conducted within an acceptable level of safety and, where possible, identify and realise areas of mutual benefit.
- Counter-Unmanned Aerial Systems (C-UAS). The C-UAS WG focuses on improving the interoperability of our "Five Eyes" security forces' TTPs and assets which protect our airbases against the UAS threat.
- Fuels, Lubricants and Gases (FLG). The FLG WG addresses essential capabilities that include the provision of aviation FLG and associated products. The FLG WG focuses on improving the interoperability of our fuels, oils, lubricants and gases by standardising techniques and procedures for the testing, certification, and acceptance of aviation FLG (including sustainable aviation fuels (SAF)).
- Operational Training Infrastructure (OTI). OTI comprises the framework, resources and training environments required to accomplish mission essential task training in support of operational force combat readiness. The interoperability focus for the OTI WG is to increase operational training opportunities in the live, synthetic and blended (LSB) environments between "Five Eyes" air forces by cohering our LSB activity and exploiting simulated and synthetically enhanced live training.
- Combined Joint All-Domain Command & Control (CJADC2). The CJADC2 WG aims to synchronise and enable the integration of "Five Eyes" partners to deliver CJADC2 within the air domain, and to demonstrate this C2 capability within scheduled wargaming and exercise activity, coordinated alongside Joint efforts and activities.

== AFIC products ==
AFIC's primary outputs are interoperability documents focused upon increasing operational effectiveness:

- Air Standards (AIRSTD). An AFIC AIRSTD is a formally documented declaration between "Five Eyes" nations that their respective National procedures reflect the detailed military doctrine, TTPs and/or materiel thereby enhancing their ability to conduct Joint and Combined air operations.
- Information Publications (INFOPUB). An AFIC INFOPUB is developed where there is no standardised procedure between Nations, but there is a perceived benefit for "Five Eyes" partners to be aware of each other's best practice.

== Related organisations ==
AFIC maintains links with other combined interoperability bodies – harmonizing activities and working in collaboration on major projects. These include:

- ABCANZ Armies Program (land forces equivalent)
- ANZUS – NATO equivalent linking Australia, New Zealand and the US.
- AUSCANNZUKUS (naval equivalent)
- Combined Communications Electronics Board (military communications equivalent)
- Five Eyes – equivalent signals intelligence network
- NATO – as Canada, the UK and US also belong to NATO, cross functional networking with this organisation is ongoing.
- The Technical Cooperation Program (equivalent in military technology and science)

== See also ==
- AUKUS (submarine engineering/technology agreement)
- CANZUK (proposed formal alliance)
- UKUSA Agreement (signals intelligence)
