= ABCANZ Armies =

Multi-country military organization

Countries involved with the ABCANZ program.

ABCANZ Armies (formally, the American, British, Canadian, Australian, and New Zealand Armies' Program) is a program aimed at optimizing interoperability and standardization of training and equipment between the armies of Australia, Canada, New Zealand, the United Kingdom, and the United States, plus the United States Marine Corps and the Royal Marines. Established in 1947 as a means to capitalize on close cooperation between the United States, United Kingdom, and Canada during World War II, the program grew to include Australia (in 1963) and New Zealand (as an observer from 1965, with full membership in 2006, although the organization's short title remained "ABCA Armies' Program").

== History ==
The program started in 1947 as the "Plan to Effect Standardization" between the armies of the United States, United Kingdom, and Canada (the ABC Armies), with the three nations looking to capitalize on the close cooperation between the forces during World War II. In 1954, the Plan was replaced by the "Basic Standardization Concept".

Australia joined the organization in 1963, and the ABCA Program was established with the ratification of the "Basic Standardization Agreement 1964" on 1 October 1964. In 1965, Australia successfully sponsored the introduction of New Zealand to the agreement as an observer.

Originally, the role of ABCANZ was limited to issues of standardization for soldier equipment, training, and tactics. Following the September 11 attacks, a review by the Program's Heads of Delegations saw the Program modified to address the changing security environment and improve responsiveness, relevance, and focus on interoperability. The overhaul was completed by June 2004.

Also in 2004, the increasing involvement of the United States Marine Corps was formally recognized with a Memorandum of Understanding between the Corps and the United States Army, allowing both forces to be represented by a single position. Following this, the United Kingdom delegation successfully incorporated the Royal Marines. New Zealand became a full member of ABCA in early 2006.

== Equivalent organizations ==
Equivalent organizations for the nations' navies (AUSCANNZUKUS - Australia, Canada, New Zealand, United Kingdom and United States naval C4 organization), air forces (ASIC - Air and Space Interoperability Council), the military scientific communities (TTCP - The Technical Cooperation Program), and the Intelligence communities (UKUSA and Five Eyes) also exist.

== See also ==
- Air and Space Interoperability Council (air forces)
- AUSCANNZUKUS (navies)
- CANZUK (proposed economic union)
- Combined Communications Electronics Board (communication-electronics)
- Five Eyes (intelligence)
- The Technical Cooperation Program (technology and science)
- UKUSA Agreement (signal intelligence)
