= 1943 BRUSA Agreement =

1943 agreement between the United Kingdom and United States

The 1943 BRUSA Agreement (Britain–United States of America agreement) was an agreement between the British and US governments to facilitate co-operation between the US War Department and the British Government Code and Cypher School (GC&CS). It followed the 1942 Holden Agreement.

== History ==
=== Sinkov mission ===
The Sinkov mission of January 1941 from America visited the British Government Code and Cypher School headquarters at Bletchley Park, England. They met British "codebreakers", including Alan Turing, and negotiated an agreement to collaborate on cryptological work (see Ultra). Some information was shared by the British about their work on cryptanalysis of the Enigma machine.

=== Holden Agreement ===
The Holden Agreement of October 1942 gave the United States overall responsibility for Japanese naval codes, although with continued British participation.

The agreement specifically stated that Eric Nave was not to work at FRUMEL the Australian naval codebreaking establishment run by USN Lieutenant Rudolph (Rudy) Fabian. Fabian thought Nave had breached security with his desire to share information with the Army Central Bureau, where Nave transferred to (and was welcomed).

=== BRUSA Agreement ===
Colonel Alfred McCormack of the Special Branch of Military Intelligence Service, Colonel Telford Taylor of Military Intelligence, and Lieutenant Colonel William Friedman visited Bletchley Park in April 1943. The American trio worked with Commander Edward Travis (RN), the head of the British communications intelligence (COMINT) facility; and shared their solution to the Japanese Purple machine.

This led to the signing of the 1943 BRUSA Agreement on 17 May, which was a formal agreement to share intelligence information. It covered:

- the exchange of personnel;
- joint regulations for the handling and distribution of the highly sensitive material.

The security regulations, procedures and protocols for co-operation formed the basis for all signals intelligence (SIGINT) activities of both the US National Security Agency and the British GCHQ.

=== UKUSA Agreement ===
The agreement was formalized by the UKUSA Agreement in 1946. This document was signed on 5 March 1946 by Colonel Patrick Marr-Johnson (who had headed the Wireless Experimental Centre in Delhi during the war) for the U.K.'s London Signals Intelligence Board and Lieutenant General Hoyt Vandenberg for the U.S. State–Army–Navy Communication Intelligence Board.

== See also ==
- Allied technological cooperation during World War II
- Atlantic Charter (1941)
- British intelligence agencies
- Quadripartite Agreement (1947)
- Tizard Mission
- United States Intelligence Community
