= The Technical Cooperation Program =

Military defence organisation

The Technical Cooperation Program (TTCP) is a long-standing international organisation concerned with cooperation on defence science and technology matters, including national security and civil defence. Its membership comprises Australia, Canada, New Zealand, the United Kingdom (UK) and the United States (US).

== History ==
=== Declaration of Common Purpose ===
TTCP commenced in 1957 as a bilateral activity between the United Kingdom and the United States when the US President and the UK Prime Minister made the following Declaration of Common Purpose:

The arrangements which the nations of the free world have made for collective defense and mutual help are based on the recognition that the concept of national self sufficiency is now out of date. The countries of the free world are interdependent and only in genuine partnership, by combining their resources and sharing tasks in many fields, can progress and safety be found. For our part we have agreed that our two countries will henceforth act in accordance with this principle.

=== Tripartite Technical Cooperation Program ===
Immediately following the Declaration of Common Purpose, the Canadian government subscribed to the principle of interdependence and was admitted by the UK and the US. The resulting arrangement was known as the Tripartite Technical Cooperation Program (or TTCP for short).

=== Australia and New Zealand ===
Australia joined TTCP in 1965; the organisation's name was changed from Tripartite Technical Cooperation Program to The Technical Cooperation Program, which allowed the abbreviation for the organisation to be kept as TTCP. New Zealand joined TTCP in 1969.

== Organisation ==
=== Top level ===
The organisation of TTCP is headed up by a senior official from each of the five participating nations, known collectively as the Principals. Supporting the Principals are their TTCP Deputies, based in Washington, and a secretariat.

=== Technical organisation ===
Reporting to the Principals are a number of multilateral "TTCP Groups", each comprising Technical Panels and time limited Action Groups. In April 2009 there were 11 TTCP Groups:

- Aerospace Systems Group
- Chemical, Biological & Radiological Defence Group (CBR)
- Conventional Weapons Technology Group
- Command, Control, Communications & Information Systems Group (C3I) (Note: Note that although C3I is more commonly used as an abbreviation for Command, Control, Communications & Intelligence, in the case of TTCP, the I abbreviates "Information". Two reasons for this are that there is a separate group of Five Eyes organisations that address cooperation in the Intelligence domains, and Intelligence is NOT part of the TTCP domain.)
- Electronic Warfare Systems Group (EW)
- Human Resources & Performance Group (HUM)
- Joint Systems & Analysis Group (JSA)
- Land Systems Group
- Maritime Systems Group
- Materials & Processing Technology Group
- Sensors Group

Each Technical Panel is expected to establish and monitor major collaborative projects in priority areas of defined mutual national interest. An Action Group is more limited in scope than a Technical Panel and has clearly stated objectives and preset milestones. It is formed by a "TTCP Group" to address a specific high priority problem and is terminated on completion of its assignment.

With the cutbacks in US and Australian defense/defence spending at the start of the 2010s, international face-to-face interaction in TTCP has been severely reduced.

== The "Five Eyes" and other international organisations ==
Three TTCP nations (Canada, UK and the US) are also members of the NATO Research and Technology Organisation. Four of the nations (Australia, Canada, UK and US) are also members of the twenty seven nation Multilateral Interoperability Programme. Of the five TTCP nations, only the UK has ever been a member of the European Defence Agency.

Collectively the five nations comprising TTCP are often referred to as the "Five Eyes" community for intelligence and also participate in the following related activities:

- ABCA Armies: Australian, British, Canadian, United States and New Zealand Armies - originally Australian, British, Canadian and American Armies;
- Air and Space Interoperability Council (ASIC, for air forces);
- AUSCANNZUKUS: Australia, Canada, New Zealand, UK and US navies C4 organisation;
- Combined Communications Electronics Board (communication-electronics).
- Five Eyes (intelligence)
- UKUSA Agreement (signal intelligence)

== See also ==
- ECHELON
- CANZUK
