= Canadian Forces Intelligence Command =

Unified command for all intelligence capabilities of the Canadian Armed Forces

- Commandement du renseignement des Forces canadiennes
- Active: 2013–present
- Country: Canada
- Branch: Canadian Armed Forces
- Type: Military intelligence command
- Role: Intelligence collection and assessment
- Garrison/HQ: Ottawa
- Mottos: Scientia est vis (Latin for 'From knowledge, strength')
- Website: canada.ca/en/department-national-defence/corporate/organizational-structure/canadian-forces-intelligence-command.html

Commanders
- Commander: Major-General Dave Abboud

Canadian Forces Intelligence Command (CFINTCOM; French: Commandement du renseignement des Forces canadiennes, COMRENSFC) is the organization that centralizes all intelligence collection and assessment capabilities of the Canadian Armed Forces.

== History ==
CFINTCOM was formed in 2013 as a unified command that brought together the Canadian Armed Forces' defence intelligence units under a single Level 1 formation. The Commander of CFINTCOM is a Major General (MGen) or Rear Admiral (RAdm) and is concurrently appointed as the Chief of Defence Intelligence (CDI), who serves as the functional authority for defence intelligence across the Department of National Defence and the Canadian Armed Forces, meaning the same officer heads both the CAF command and the broader DND/CAF defence intelligence enterprise.

In April 2020, Canadian media reported that CFINTCOM's Medical Intelligence Cell (MEDINT) collected information related to the COVID-19 pandemic when the outbreak started at Wuhan.

== Commanders ==
Rank	Name	Element	Command Start
MGen	Christian Rousseau	Canadian Army	July 2010
MGen	Paul Wynnyk	Canadian Army	July 2014
RAdm	Scott Bishop	Royal Canadian Navy	June 2016
MGen	Michael Wright	Canadian Army	June 2021
MGen	Dave Abboud	Canadian Army	July 2024

== Formation ==
The main formation within the command is the Canadian Forces Intelligence Group (CF Int Gp), which consists of the following units:

- Canadian Forces Joint Imagery Centre (CFJIC)
- Canadian Forces National Counter-Intelligence Unit (CFNCIU)
- Joint Meteorological Centre (JMC)
- Mapping and Charting Establishment (MCE)
- Canadian Forces School of Military Intelligence (CFSMI)
- Joint Task Force X (JTF X)
- Medical Intelligence Cell
