= CANZUK =

Proposed international alliance

World map with proposed CANZUK nations shaded

CANZUK is a proposed alliance of Canada, Australia, New Zealand and the United Kingdom to form an international organisation or confederation similar in scope to the former European Economic Community. This includes increased trade, foreign policy co-operation, military co-operation and mobility of citizens between the four states. This is tied together by similar economic systems, social values and political and legal system, a shared head of state being King Charles III, in addition to the majority population of each country speaking English. The idea is lobbied by the advocacy group CANZUK International. Other supporters include think tanks such as the Adam Smith Institute, the Henry Jackson Society, Bruges Group and politicians from the four countries.

== History ==
=== The term ===
The term CANZUK was first coined by William David McIntyre in his 1967 book Colonies into Commonwealth in the context of a "CANZUK Union". The idea of increased migration, trade and foreign policy cooperation between the CANZUK countries was created and popularized in 2015 by CEO and Founder of CANZUK International (formerly the Commonwealth Freedom of Movement Organisation), James Skinner.

In the wake of the 2016 United Kingdom European Union membership referendum and the decision made by Britain to leave the European Union, writers such as Andrew Lilico and James C. Bennett, along with academics such as the historian Andrew Roberts, also advocated that Canada, Australia, New Zealand and the United Kingdom merge and form a new entity in international politics. Roberts suggested that such a bloc could slot into the international order as a third pillar of the West (alongside the United States and the European Union). Beyond this, Roberts argues that due to its territorial scale, geographic scope and advanced economy that it would qualify as a "great power" and potentially a "global power" (or emerging superpower).

Some advocates such as Roberts favour a federal or confederal union. Others, such as Lilico, describe the objective as being the creation of a "geopolitical partnership" akin to the European Economic Community. In the version favoured by Lilico, by the advocacy group CANZUK international and by the Conservative Party of Canada, the proposal would involve the creation of a free-movement zone, a multilateral free trade agreement and a security partnership. The more general concept of deepening trade ties (with or without a multilateral agreement) has many advocates, including figures such as former Australian Prime Minister Scott Morrison, former Canadian Prime Minister Justin Trudeau, former British Prime Minister Theresa May and former New Zealand Prime Minister Jacinda Ardern.

=== Relationship ===
Canada, Australia and New Zealand are former dominions of the British Empire where people of British ethnic origin came to constitute the majority of the population. Today, the four CANZUK countries maintain a close affinity of cultural, diplomatic and military ties to one another. The Australian and New Zealand national flags contain the Union Flag in their canton. The Union Flag is a ceremonial flag in Canada (referred to as the Royal Union Flag), and the previous national flag and three current provincial flags include a Union Flag.

Canada, Australia, New Zealand and the United Kingdom are also Commonwealth realms which share Charles III as their constitutional monarch and their head of state. The countries share a number of institutional, linguistic and religious similarities such as the use of political systems based upon the Westminster parliamentary system of government, and common law. The CANZUK countries form part of the English-speaking world and share a number of Anglosphere military initiatives with each other including the Fincastle Trophy, Five Eyes intelligence, ABCANZ Armies and AUSCANNZUKUS, which are concerned with increased military and naval co-operation. Canada and the United Kingdom are allied through the North Atlantic Treaty Organization while Australia, New Zealand and the United Kingdom are allied through the Five Power Defence Arrangements. Canada, Australia and New Zealand have been founding members of the larger Comprehensive and Progressive Agreement for Trans-Pacific Partnership (CPTPP) trade bloc since 2018, and the United Kingdom joined the CPTPP in 2024.

All four nations have diverse, multicultural populations, free and open presses, and are closely aligned on key social issues. Public relations are extremely warm between the four countries, with consistent evidence that people in Canada, Australia, New Zealand and the United Kingdom regard each other's countries as their own country's closest friends and allies in the world, including the countries joining the United States of America in the Five Eyes intelligence sharing community.

Since 1983, Australia and New Zealand have had formal trade ties with the Closer Economic Relations (CER) agreement.

In 2021, Australia and the United Kingdom agreed to one of the broadest trade agreements in Australia's history, only comparable with a similar deal between New Zealand and Australia. Greatly liberalising free movement of goods and people, the new agreement will reduce technological and digital barriers between the two nations. It is intended that lawyer degrees in Australia and the United Kingdom will have the same legal framework, making it easier for lawyers in both nations to apply for work in each other's countries. The new agreement will reduce visa requirements for unskilled farmworkers and other regional work sectors.

== Country comparison ==
	United Kingdom	Canada	Australia	New Zealand
Flag	United Kingdom	Canada	Australia	New Zealand
Coat of arms	United Kingdom	Canada	Australia	New Zealand
Population	69,483,939 (as of 2025)	40,769,890 (as of 2024)	26,966,789 (as of 2024)	5,356,700 (as of December 2024)
Area	242,494 km^{2}	9,984,670 km^{2}	7,741,220 km^{2}	268,838 km^{2}
Population density	287/km^{2}	3.9/km^{2}	3.5/km^{2}	18.3/km^{2}
Exclusive Economic Zone	6,805,586 km^{2}	5,559,077 km^{2}	8,505,348 km^{2}	4,420,565 km^{2}
Capital city	London	Ottawa	Canberra	Wellington
Largest city	London	Toronto	Sydney	Auckland
Form of government	Unitary parliamentary constitutional monarchy	Federal parliamentary constitutional monarchy	Federal parliamentary constitutional monarchy	Unitary parliamentary constitutional monarchy
Monarch	Charles III			
Prime Minister	Andy Burnham	Mark Carney	Anthony Albanese	Christopher Luxon
Official languages	English (Note: de facto)	English; French	English	English; Māori; New Zealand Sign Language
Religions	46.5% Christianity; 37.8% Irreligious; 6.0% Islam; 1.6% Hinduism; 0.8% Sikhism; 0.4% Buddhism; 0.4% Judaism; 0.6% Other; 5.9% not stated; (As of 2021/22) (Note: Scotland held its census a year later after England, Wales and Northern Ireland due to the COVID-19 pandemic. As a result, the data shown is from two separate years.)	53.3% Christian; 34.6% Irreligious; 4.9% Muslim; 2.3% Hindu; 2.1% Sikh; 1.0% Buddhist; 0.9% Jewish; 0.9% Other; (As of 2021) (Note: Canadian religions are 2021 estimates.)	43.9% Christian; 38.9% Irreligious; 3.2% Muslim; 2.7% Hindu; 2.4% Buddhist; 0.8% Sikh; 0.4% Jewish; 0.9% Other; (As of 2021) (Note: Australian religions are 2021 estimates.)	51.6% Irreligious; 32.3% Christian; 2.9% Hindu; 1.5% Islam; 1.3% Maori religions; 1.1% Buddhist; 0.4% Spiritualism and New Age; 0.1% Jewish; 2.0% Other; 6.9% not stated; (As of 2023)
Currency	Pound sterling (£)	Canadian dollar ($)	Australian dollar ($)	New Zealand dollar ($)

== Economic comparison ==
Using data from 2019, below is a table comparing the CANZUK countries to each other, as well as their combined size as a percentage of the world.

Country	Population	Area	Exclusive Economic Zone (2017)	Military Expenditures (USD billion - 2020)	Nominal GDP (billions USD)	Nominal GDP per capita (USD)	PPP GDP (billions USD)	PPP GDP per capita (USD)	National Wealth (billions USD)	National Wealth per capita (USD)	Human Development Index (2023)
United Kingdom	67,886,004	243,610 km^{2}	6,805,586 km^{2}	55.10	$3,960	$56,660	$4,450	$63,760	$14,073	$212,640	0.946 (very high)
Canada	38,014,184	9,984,670 km^{2}	5,559,077 km^{2}	22.50	$2,280	$54,930	$2,720	$65,500	$7,407	$202,240	0.939 (very high)
Australia	25,741,500	7,741,220 km^{2}	8,505,348 km^{2}	26.30	$1,830	$65,950	$1,980	$71,430	$7,329	$299,748	0.958 (very high)
New Zealand	5,356,700	268,838 km^{2}	4,420,565 km^{2}	4.30	$262	$49,380	$297	$55,780	$1,162	$240,821	0.938 (very high)
Total	136,998,388	18,238,338 km^{2}	25,290,576 km^{2}	108.2	$8,332	$56,730	$9,447	$64,117	$29,971	$226,913	0.945 (very high)
Total as % of World	1.7%	11.7%	18.3%	5.4%	7.1%	–	4.5%	–	10.7%	–	–

== Dependencies and overseas territories ==
=== Canada ===
Canada has no external territories, but maintains three internal territories alongside the provinces of the Canadian mainland. Unlike the provinces, the territories of Canada have no inherent sovereignty and have only those powers delegated to them by the federal government. They include all of mainland Canada north of latitude 60° north and west of Hudson Bay and all islands north of the Canadian mainland (from those in James Bay to the Queen Elizabeth Islands).

=== Australia ===
In addition to the six Australian States, Australia also comprises ten territories, whose existence and governmental structure (if any) depend on federal legislation. The territories are distinguished for federal administrative purposes between internal territories, i.e. those within the Australian mainland, and external territories, although the differences among all the territories relate to population rather than location.

Two of the three internal territories—the Australian Capital Territory (ACT), which was established to be a neutral site of the federal capital, and the Northern Territory—function almost as states. Each has self-government, through its legislative assembly, but the assembly's legislation can be federally overridden. Each has its own judiciary, with appeal to a federal court. The third internal territory, the Jervis Bay Territory, is the product of Australia's complex relationship with its capital city; rather than having the same level of autonomy as the other internal territories, it has services provided by the ACT.

There are also seven external territories, not part of the Australian mainland or of any state. Three of them have a small permanent population, two have tiny and transient populations, and two are uninhabited. All are directly administered by the federal Department of Infrastructure, Regional Development and Cities (or the Department of the Environment and Energy in the case of the Australian Antarctic Territory). Norfolk Island, which is permanently populated, was partially self-governing until 2015.

Territory	Flag	Coat of Arms	Capital (largest settlement)	Population (Jun 2019)	Area (km^{2})	External territories
Ashmore and Cartier Islands		Australia	None (offshore anchorage)	0	750	
Australian Antarctic Territory		Australia	None (Davis Station)	Less than 1,000	5,896,500 km	
Christmas Island		Australia	Flying Fish Cove	1,938	135	
Cocos (Keeling) Islands		Australia	West Island	547	14	
Coral Sea Islands		Australia	None (Willis Island)	4 (Note: No permanent population, weather monitoring station generally with four staff.)	780,000	
Heard Island and McDonald Islands		Australia	None (Atlas Cove)	0	372	
Norfolk Island		Norfolk Island	Kingston	1,758	35	

=== New Zealand ===
The Pacific islands of the Cook Islands and Niue became New Zealand's first colonies in 1901 and then protectorates. From 1965 the Cook Islands became self-governing, as did Niue from 1974. Tokelau came under New Zealand control in 1925 and remains a non-self-governing territory.

The Ross Dependency comprises that sector of the Antarctic continent between 160° east and 150° west longitude, together with the islands lying between those degrees of longitude and south of latitude 60° south. The British (imperial) government took possession of this territory in 1923 and entrusted it to the administration of New Zealand. Neither Russia nor the United States recognises this claim, and the matter remains unresolved (along with all other Antarctic claims) by the Antarctic Treaty, which serves to mostly smooth over these differences. The area is uninhabited, apart from scientific bases.

New Zealand citizenship law treats all parts of the Realm equally, so most people born in New Zealand, the Cook Islands, Niue, Tokelau and the Ross Dependency before 2006 are New Zealand citizens. Further conditions apply for those born from 2006 onwards.

Territory	Flag	Coat of Arms	Capital (largest settlement)	Population (Jun 2018)	Area (km^{2})
Associated states
Cook Islands		Cook Islands	Avarua	21,388	236
Niue			Alofi	1,145	260
Dependent territories
Ross Dependency		New Zealand	None (Scott Base)	Scott Base: 10–85 McMurdo Station: 200–1,000 (seasonally)	450,000
Tokelau			Fakaofo	1,405	10

=== United Kingdom ===
==== British Overseas Territories ====
The British Overseas Territories (BOTs) are fourteen territories all with a constitutional link with – but not forming part of – the United Kingdom. Most of the permanently inhabited territories are internally self-governing, with the UK retaining responsibility for defence and foreign relations. Three are inhabited only by a transitory population of military or scientific personnel. They all have the British monarch as head of state.

The term "British Overseas Territory" was introduced by the British Overseas Territories Act 2002, replacing the term British Dependent Territory, introduced by the British Nationality Act 1981. Prior to 1 January 1983, the territories were officially referred to as British Crown Colonies.

The British Overseas Territories and Crown Dependencies are themselves distinct from the Commonwealth realms, a group of 15 independent countries (including the United Kingdom) each having Charles III as their reigning monarch, and from the Commonwealth of Nations, a voluntary association of 54 countries mostly with historic links to the British Empire (which also includes all Commonwealth realms).

As of April 2018, three Territories (the Falkland Islands, Gibraltar and the Sovereign Base Areas of Akrotiri and Dhekelia on Cyprus) are the responsibility of the Minister of State for Europe and the Americas; the Minister responsible for the remaining Territories is the Parliamentary Under-Secretary of State for the Overseas Territories and Sustainable Development.

Name	Flag	Arms	Capital	Population	Area	Location	GDP (nominal)	GDP Per Capita (nominal)
Anguilla		Anguilla	The Valley	14,869(2019 estimate)	91 km^{2} (35.1 sq mi)	Caribbean, North Atlantic Ocean	£141.62 million	£9,850
Bermuda		Bermuda	Hamilton	62,506(2019 estimate)	54 km^{2} (20.8 sq mi)	North Atlantic Ocean between the Azores, the Caribbean, Cape Sable Island and Canada	£4.5 billion	£69,240
British Antarctic Territory			Rothera (main base)	50 non-permanent in winter, over 400 in summer (research personnel)	1,709,400 km^{2} (660,000 sq mi)	Antarctica		
British Indian Ocean Territory		British Indian Ocean Territory	Diego Garcia (base)	3,000 non-permanent (UK and US military personnel; estimate)	60 km^{2} (23 sq mi)	Indian Ocean		
British Virgin Islands		British Virgin Islands	Road Town	31,758 (2018 census)	153 km^{2} (59 sq mi)	Caribbean, North Atlantic Ocean	£870 million	£28,040
Cayman Islands		Cayman Islands	George Town	68,076 (2019 estimate)	264 km^{2} (101.9 sq mi)	Caribbean	£4.15 billion	£146,250
Falkland Islands		Falkland Islands	Stanley	3,377 (2019 estimate) 1,350 non-permanent (UK military personnel; 2012 estimate)	12,173 km^{2} (4,700 sq mi)	South Atlantic Ocean	£132.82 million	£57,170
Gibraltar		Gibraltar	Gibraltar	33,701(2019 estimate) 1,250 non-permanent (UK military personnel; 2012 estimate)	6.5 km^{2} (2.5 sq mi)	Iberian Peninsula, Continental Europe	£1.89 billion	£74,960
Montserrat		Montserrat	Plymouth (abandoned – de facto capital Brades)	5,215 (2019 census)	101 km^{2} (39 sq mi)	Caribbean, North Atlantic Ocean	£130.72 million	£25,060
Pitcairn, Henderson, Ducie and Oeno Islands		Pitcairn Islands	Adamstown	50 (2018 estimate) 6 non-permanent (2014 estimate)	47 km^{2} (18 sq mi)	Pacific Ocean	£84,870	£1,700
Saint Helena, Ascension and Tristan da Cunha, including:		United Kingdom	Jamestown	5,633 (total; 2016 census)	420 km^{2} (162 sq mi)	South Atlantic Ocean	£18.65 million	£4,570
Saint Helena				4,349 (Saint Helena; 2019 census)			£18.65 million	£4,570
Ascension Island				880 (Ascension; estimate) 1,000 non-permanent UK military personnel (estimate)			£18.65 million	£4,570
Tristan da Cunha				300 (estimate) 9 non-permanent (weather personnel)			£18.65 million	£4,570
South Georgia and the South Sandwich Islands		South Georgia and the South Sandwich Islands	King Edward Point	99 non-permanent (officials and research personnel)	3,903 km^{2} (1,507 sq mi)	South Atlantic Ocean		
Sovereign Base Areas of Akrotiri and Dhekelia		United Kingdom	Episkopi Cantonment	7,700 (Cypriots; estimate) 8,000 non-permanent (UK military personnel; estimate)	255 km^{2} (98 sq mi)	Cyprus, Mediterranean Sea		
Turks and Caicos Islands		Turks and Caicos Islands	Cockburn Town	38,191 (2019 estimate)	430 km^{2} (166 sq mi)	Lucayan Archipelago, North Atlantic Ocean	£830 million	£21,920

==== Crown Dependencies ====
The Crown Dependencies (French: Dépendances de la Couronne; Manx: Croghaneyn-crooin) are three island territories off the coast of Great Britain that are self-governing possessions of The Crown: the Bailiwick of Guernsey, the Bailiwick of Jersey and the Isle of Man. They do not form part of either the United Kingdom or the British Overseas Territories. Internationally, the dependencies are considered "territories for which the United Kingdom is responsible", rather than sovereign states. As a result, they are not member states of the Commonwealth of Nations. However, they do have relationships with the Commonwealth, the European Union, and other international organisations, and are members of the British–Irish Council. They have their own teams in the Commonwealth Games.

As the Crown dependencies are not sovereign states, the power to pass legislation affecting the islands ultimately rests with the government of the United Kingdom (though this is rarely done without the consent of the dependencies, and the right to do so is disputed). However, they each have their own legislative assembly, with the power to legislate on many local matters with the assent of the Crown (Privy Council, or in the case of the Isle of Man in certain circumstances the Lieutenant-Governor). In each case, the head of government is called the Chief Minister.

Name	Flag	Coat of Arms	Capital	Population	Area	Title of Monarch
Bailiwick of Guernsey^{A}	Alderney	Alderney	Saint Anne	65,849	78 km^{2} (30 sq mi)	Duke of Normandy
Bailiwick of Guernsey^{A}	Guernsey	Guernsey	Saint Peter Port (capital of the whole Bailiwick and of Guernsey)	65,849	78 km^{2} (30 sq mi)	Duke of Normandy
Bailiwick of Guernsey^{A}	Sark		The Seigneurie (de facto; Sark does not have a capital city)	65,849	78 km^{2} (30 sq mi)	Duke of Normandy
Bailiwick of Jersey		Jersey	Saint Helier	106,800	118.2 km^{2} (46 sq mi)	Duke of Normandy
Isle of Man		Isle of Man	Douglas	84,997	572 km^{2} (221 sq mi)	Lord of Mann

^AIncluding Alderney, Guernsey, and Sark.

== Supporting views ==
Several organisations have been set up that promote, to varying degrees, much closer associations between the CANZUK nations. CANZUK International has, as its stated aim, the desire to establish an area of freedom of movement akin to that which existed before the European Communities Act 1972, or as a mirror to the rights of free movement as seen within the Trans-Tasman Travel Arrangement. Other organisations are largely voluntary groupings of those who advocate the more specific idea of transnational union, such as "CANZUK Uniting".

=== Canada ===
Several members of parliament voiced their support for the CANZUK initiative during the Conservative Party of Canada's 2017 leadership election. The eventual winner of the leadership election, Andrew Scheer, stated his support for a CANZUK free trade deal in March 2017. At a debate in Vancouver, British Columbia, Scheer stated, "I very much support a trade deal with those countries. Australia, New Zealand and the United Kingdom have a similar basis of law, they have a common democratic system, they have the same types of legislation and regulations around investment and trade. Those are the types of things we don't enjoy with China".

Other candidates for the Conservative Party leadership also adopted CANZUK free trade and free movement as a part of their campaigns platforms, including Erin O'Toole and Michael Chong. In April 2017, O'Toole released a video with CANZUK International, describing the CANZUK initiative as "a no brainer", stating that Canada already offers free trade and free mobility with citizens of the United States and should therefore offer such benefits to "our other closest allies". O'Toole again supported CANZUK during his successful campaign for the leadership of the Conservative Party of Canada in 2020.

In August 2018, the Conservative Party of Canada adopted CANZUK as official party policy at their 2018 party convention by 215 votes to 7. The party presently serves as the Official Opposition in the Parliament of Canada.

After his victory in the August 2020 Conservative Party of Canada leadership election, Erin O'Toole, made CANZUK a priority in his platform.

During the official French debate of the 2025 Liberal Party of Canada leadership election, Frank Baylis named CANZUK as a new economic bloc to create stronger economic links abroad following tariff threats from the United States. He cited similar forms of government, shared values, and a common language as factors that would support integration. This follows freedom of movement between Canada, Australia, New Zealand, and the United Kingdom being adopted by the Liberal Party as policy with the adoption of a resolution endorsed by the Young Liberals of Canada at the 2023 Liberal National Convention. The Young Liberals had released a policy pledge for the leadership election in January 2025 prior to the debate, and named CANZUK as a priority item.

=== Australia ===
In August 2017, Liberal Senator for Victoria, James Paterson, published an opinion piece in the Australian Financial Review declaring support for CANZUK free trade and free movement, stating: "With Australia, New Zealand and Canada all lining up to sign post-Brexit trade agreements with the United Kingdom, we have an opportunity to push for a wide-ranging agreement between all four Commonwealth nations...It's an idea whose time has come."

=== New Zealand ===
In New Zealand, ACT New Zealand has expressed support for a "free-movement zone", with leader David Seymour stating: "Successful nations like Britain and New Zealand shouldn't be putting up walls and shutting off from each other when it's the exchange of ideas that has made our nations so prosperous. Brexit provides new options as Britain pivots away from European immigration. Let's approach Britain with a proposal for a two-way free movement agreement".

In April 2018, Simon Bridges MP, then Leader of the Opposition and Leader of the National Party, announced his support for CANZUK.

Leader of the New Zealand First political party Winston Peters called in February 2016 for a Commonwealth Free Trade Area modelled on the one in existence between Australia and New Zealand. In his comments, he suggested the inclusion of the UK, Canada, Australia and New Zealand in this area, with the possibility of adding others, referring to the putative free trade area as a 'Closer Commonwealth Economic Relations' area, or CCER. CCER was included as New Zealand government policy in the Labour-NZ First coalition agreement.

=== United Kingdom ===
On 11 July 2012, Andrew Rosindell MP for Romford put forward a private members' bill to the UK Parliament which would involve allowing "subjects of Her Majesty's realms to enter the United Kingdom through a dedicated channel at international terminals", "display prominently a portrait of Her Majesty as Head of State" and the Union flag, and other provisions, which would include citizens of Canada, Australia and New Zealand, with the stated aim of introducing reciprocal border agreements between the United Kingdom and other Commonwealth realms in the future. The bill was supported by MPs Nigel Dodds (DUP), Rory Stewart (Conservative), Bob Blackman (Conservative), Steve Baker (Conservative), Priti Patel (Conservative), Mark Menzies (Conservative), Kate Hoey (Labour), Ian Paisley (DUP), John Redwood (Conservative) and Thomas Docherty (Labour). The "Bill failed to complete its passage through Parliament before the end of the session ... and [made] no further progress."

The Adam Smith Institute expressed its support for CANZUK in early 2018.

Then Conservative Party MEP for South East England Daniel Hannan expressed his support for CANZUK as a guest speaker at the 2018 Canadian Conservative Party convention in Halifax. Scottish Conservative MP Bill Grant also expressed his support for increased ties between the United Kingdom, Australia, Canada and New Zealand on his webpage in 2018 and stated that British Ministers are aware of CANZUK and "are very enthusiastic about our future relationships and trade with each of the countries involved".

Since early 2020, the grassroots Conservative Party movement Conservatives for CANZUK has influenced MPs to build support for a post-Brexit realignment of British foreign policy among Conservative Party members, other MPs, peers and policy makers. Open supporters includes 23 MPs among whom notably include Jeremy Hunt and Paul Bristow - chairman of the CANZUK APPG. In 2026, Kemi Badenoch, the leader of the opposition, declared her support.

== Opposing views ==
Critics have suggested that the CANZUK project would not make sense as a geopolitical construct in the 21st century. Nick Cohen wrote in April 2016 that "It's a Eurosceptic fantasy that the 'Anglosphere' wants Brexit", and emphasises the gradual separation that has occurred between each of the states in both legal and political culture since the end of the British Empire.

Former Australian Labor prime minister Kevin Rudd reiterated this sentiment, stating that "much as any Australian, Canadian and New Zealand governments of whichever persuasion would do whatever they could to frame new free-trade agreements with the UK, the bottom line is that 65 million of us do not come within a bull's roar of Britain's adjacent market of 450 million Europeans", describing the idea as "bollocks".

Economic, geographical, political and social complexities would limit the influence that this bloc could exert. Only one of the countries (the United Kingdom) has significant military capabilities, and it is the only one with a permanent seat on the United Nations Security Council. The UK's economy is considerably bigger than those of each of the three other countries.

Chris Randle wrote in the American, left-wing Jacobin that "Anglo-conservatives sometimes fantasize about reuniting the dominions under 'CANZUK,' a trade bloc where workers could be exploited freely. In Europe's most regionally unequal economy, the United Kingdom, desiccated from years of austerity, this is what passes for political ambition: necromancers sewing each other's zombies together."

=== Accusations of racism ===
An editorial in Canada's Globe and Mail, which described CANZUK as "a silly name", pointed out that those Commonwealth countries with which advocates of Brexit were most enamoured were "ex-Dominions where white people predominate" and that even if it were broadened to include populous countries, the group had "nowhere near the latent appetite for trade with Britain that would make the scheme credible". In an article published in The New York Times in April 2018, historian Alex von Tunzelmann stated that "no doubt, the advocates of reviving Britain's links with Canada, Australia and New Zealand can cite myriad reasons that have nothing to do with racism to explain why some other nations are just different. Still, majority-nonwhite nations will notice if they are treated as them rather than us, because this will not be the first time that has happened."

In academia, Duncan Bell criticises contemporary 'Anglospheric discourse' and concludes that modern political commentary is "a pale imitation of previous iterations", lacking support across the political spectrum. International affairs professor Srdjan Vucetic expands on this idea further, describing CANZUK as "the latest variant of a long line of projects seeking to consolidate the British settler empire, projects that were until deep into the second half of the twentieth century justified in explicitly racist terms" and questioned the viability of a CANZUK defence pact without the inclusion of the United States, as in the Five Eyes and ABCANZ alliances.

== Official views ==
On a visit to Australia in September 2019, Liz Truss, then the UK International Trade Secretary, stated that the British government would raise free movement between Australia and the UK during post-Brexit negotiations for a free-trade agreement.

In January 2020, it was reported that Australia's Morrison government was opposed to expanding freedom of movement between Australia and the UK. Australian trade minister Simon Birmingham had said he "can't imagine full and unfettered free movement" would be discussed during post-Brexit negotiations for a free-trade agreement. Former Australian prime minister Scott Morrison had earlier said in September 2019 that "the New Zealand arrangement is quite unique and it's not one we would probably ever contemplate extending".

== Public opinion ==
Although it has maintained a level of support, the concept of CANZUK is generally regarded as highly polarised between the political left and right. While it has been praised by British nationalists for being an alternative to the European Union, the proposed union has been critiqued by those on the left. Examples of this are by unfavourably comparing CANZUK to the EU, or criticising it as being racist for solely combining the United Kingdom and three of its five former "white dominions", to the exclusion of other Anglophone countries where people from the United Kingdom formerly settled, such as India, South Africa, Singapore and Nigeria.

=== 2015 ===
Public opinion polling conducted by research firm YouGov in 2015 found that 58 per cent of British people would support freedom of movement and work between the citizens of the United Kingdom and the citizens of Australia, Canada and New Zealand, with 19 per cent opposed to the idea and 23 per cent undecided, with support for the proposals found in all four countries of the United Kingdom. The research also found that British people valued free mobility between the United Kingdom, Australia, Canada and New Zealand more than they valued free mobility between the United Kingdom and the European Union at 46 per cent to 35 per cent. Opinion polls from other firms were not published.

=== 2016 ===
Opinion poll surveys commissioned by the Royal Commonwealth Society in 2016 found that 70 per cent of Australians said they were supportive of the proposal, with 10 per cent opposed to it; 75 per cent of Canadians said they supported the idea and 15 per cent were opposed to it and 82 per cent of New Zealanders stated that they supported the idea, with 10 per cent opposed. All of the respective provinces, states and territories of Australia, Canada and New Zealand registered majority support for the proposals.

=== 2017 ===
Further polling of 2,000 people conducted in January 2017 found support for free movement of people and goods with certain limitations on citizens claiming tax-funded payments on entry across Australia, Canada, New Zealand and the United Kingdom, with undecideds included. Counting undecideds as giving support makes these results somewhat questionable. Support in Australia was at 72 per cent, 77 per cent in Canada, 81 per cent in New Zealand and 64 per cent in the United Kingdom.

=== 2018 ===
A survey carried out by CANZUK International consisting of 13,600 respondents from Australia, Canada, New Zealand and the United Kingdom conducted between January and March 2018 found increased support for reciprocal free trade and movement of people between the countries when compared to 2017, with support at 73 per cent in Australia (up 1 per cent); 76 per cent in Canada (down 1 per cent); 82 per cent in New Zealand (up 1 per cent); and 68 per cent in the United Kingdom (up 4 per cent). The opinion polling indicated greater support for the proposals in the North and South Islands of New Zealand at 83 per cent and 81 per cent support respectively; British Columbia and Ontario in Canada at 82 per cent and 80 per cent support respectively; and New South Wales and Victoria in Australia at 79 per cent support each, while lesser support was observed in Quebec in Canada at 63 per cent support; England, Northern Ireland, Wales and Scotland in the United Kingdom at 72 per cent, 64 per cent, 70 per cent and 66 per cent support respectively; and Western Australia at 65 per cent support.

=== 2025 ===
A survey carried out by CANZUK International consisting of 2,003 respondents from Canadian provinces (territories excluded) conducted in April 2025 found majority support amongst Canadians for various aspects of CANZUK. 94% supported a free trade agreement, 56% supported express checkpoints for air travel, and 57% believed that a CANZUK agreement would help protect Canada from the United States' increasingly aggressive economic measures. They also found that only 26% of Canadians had heard of CANZUK.

== See also ==
- ABCANZ Armies
- Air Force Interoperability Council
- Anglosphere
- ANZAC
- AUKUS
- AUSCANNZUKUS
- Benelux
- Border Five
- British diaspora
- British Empire
- Canadian Red Ensign
- Commonwealth free trade
- Commonwealth realm
- Dominion
- Five Eyes
- Five Nations Passport Group
- Imperial Federation
- JUSCANZ
- Migration 5
- Pacific Union
- Regionalism (international relations)
- Supranational union
- The Technical Cooperation Program
- Customs arrangements with the Crown Dependencies

International relations

- Australia–Canada relations
- Australia–New Zealand relations
- Australia–United Kingdom relations
- Canada–New Zealand relations
- Canada–United Kingdom relations
- New Zealand–United Kingdom relations
