= Directorate of Defence Intelligence and Security =

Military intelligence agency

The Directorate of Defence Intelligence and Security (DDIS), formerly the Directorate of Defence Intelligence is an intelligence agency of the New Zealand Defence Force.

== Overview ==
The DDIS is responsible for military intelligence, which includes both specific intelligence for use at the operational level and broad assessments of the military capabilities and intentions of other countries. It is also responsible for administering security clearances within the military, and for supervising the security of sensitive military property. It is one of four specialised intelligence agencies in New Zealand, alongside the Government Communications Security Bureau, the Security Intelligence Service, and the National Assessments Bureau.

== History ==
The DDIS was formed in 1967 as the "Directorate of Defence Intelligence". In 1998, it was renamed the "Directorate of Defence Intelligence and Security". As of 2014, the DDIS had an annual budget of $1.8 million.
