= Australia–Canada relations =

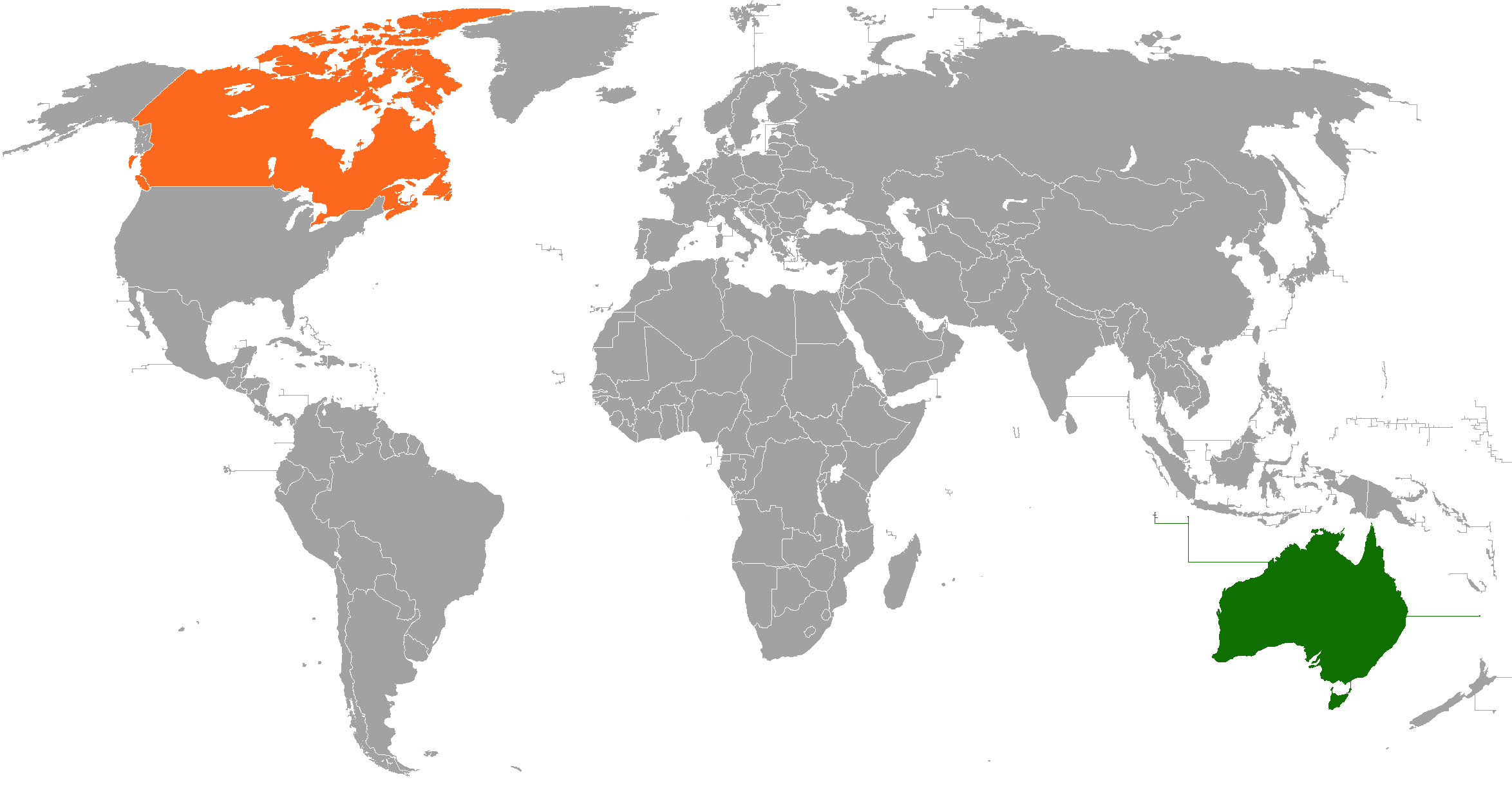

- Australia: Canada

Diplomatic mission
- High Commission of Australia, Ottawa: High Commission of Canada, Canberra

Australia and Canada have a longstanding relationship connected by shared history, culture, and political institutions. Both countries are federal Westminster parliamentary constitutional monarchies in personal union with each other as Commonwealth realms, sharing King Charles III as head of state (legally, the King is equally and separately the sovereign of both countries, as King of Australia and Canada). The two countries have a deep and institutionalized political relationship as well as close cultural ties due to their shared history as British Dominions.

Both countries are members of the Asia-Pacific Economic Cooperation, Cairns Group, Commonwealth of Nations, Comprehensive and Progressive Agreement for Trans-Pacific Partnership, Five Eyes, OECD and the United Nations. Universities in both countries are also part of Association of Pacific Rim Universities.

== History ==
=== Reluctant relations: 1886–1939 ===
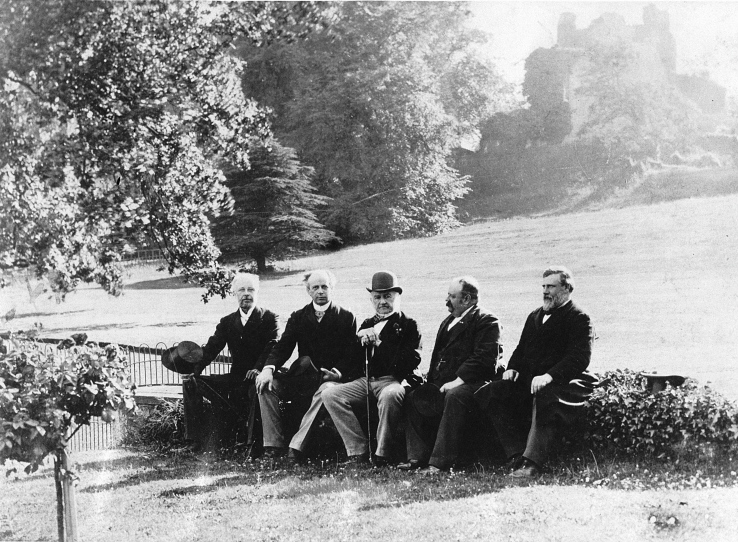
Sir Wilfrid Laurier and George Reid at Hawarden Castle, alongside W. E. Gladstone and Richard Seddon.

The earliest connections between the two nations was the deportation of Canadian rebels who instigated an uprising in Upper and Lower Canada to Australia. 154 convicted rebels from Upper Canada were sent to Australian shores. Those involved in the Upper Canada rebellions were sent to Van Diemen's Land (modern-day Tasmania). There are two monuments in Hobart, Tasmania's capital city, commemorating the Canadian convict presence in Tasmania, one at Sandy Bay and the other in Prince's Park, Battery Point.

The rebels from Lower Canada were French Canadians known as les patriotes. Like their Upper Canada counterparts, they rebelled against the appointed oligarchy that administered the colony and les patriotes, along with their English-speaking neighbours, clamoured for responsible government. As with the Upper Canada rebellions, the armed insurrections in Lower Canada also failed and 58 French Canadians were sentenced to transportation to New South Wales. Thanks to the intervention of John Bede Polding, Bishop of Sydney, they avoided the horrors of Norfolk Island and were allowed to serve their sentences in Sydney. They were eventually assigned as labourers to free settlers, contributing to the development of the colony, including the building of Parramatta Road. Place names like Canada Bay and Exile Bay and a monument at Cabarita Park in Concord, Sydney (unveiled in May 1970, by Prime Minister Pierre Trudeau), attest to their presence in Australia.

In the last quarter of the 19th century, the distances that separated Canada and the six Australian colonies suddenly narrowed. Victorian England's string of imperial successes in Africa and Asia, which gave London control over a quarter of the globe and over a fifth of its people, sparked a wave of romantic enthusiasm for the Empire. This was particularly true in Canada, where economic stagnation, French–English tension, and the lure of easy American wealth caused some to doubt the young country's capacity to survive on its own. By the mid-1880s, as the Canadian Pacific Railway wove its final few miles through the Rocky Mountains to the edge of the Pacific, several influential Canadians began to envision the new railway as an integral part of a network that would unite Britain with its Asian empire. Throughout the decade, as Canada settled its western provinces and looked outward across the Pacific, popular support for an "All-Red Route" that would link Canada by cable and steamship to Australia grew steadily.

The romance of empire made a much smaller impression on the Canadian government. Nevertheless, it was soon forced to consider its relations with the Australian colonies. A slump in world trade, unrelenting pressure from Vancouver logging interests, and the persistent arguments advanced by Sir Sandford Fleming, a leading advocate of the Pacific cable, prompted it to accord the colonies a new importance. In May 1893, cabinet agreed to give an Australian, James Huddart, a £25,000 subsidy to operate a regular steamship service between Canada and New South Wales. Shortly after, Canada's first minister of trade and commerce, Mackenzie Bowell, agreed to lead a delegation to Australia to seek new markets for Canadian exports. He was not optimistic. "I do not," he wrote on the eve of his departure, "anticipate any great immediate results from our visit to Australia. The parties with whom we have been estranged so long can scarcely be brought into a close relationship at a moment's notice." Bowell was surprised then upon receiving a warm reception in Australia, and upon his return in the winter of 1893 reached two decisions designed to enhance Canada's relations with Britain's Pacific colonies; first, it agreed to convene a colonial conference in the summer of 1894; and second, it resolved to send John Short Larke to Australia as Canada's first trade commissioner.

Canada held the 1894 Colonial Conference in Ottawa, drawing representatives from the six Australian colonies, New Zealand, the South African colonies and Britain. Frustration in Ottawa arose though, when the Canadian proposal to strengthen imperial trade relations through a system of preferential British tariffs was effectively defeated by the opposition of two of Australia's largest colonies, New South Wales and Queensland, who were suspicious the Canadian initiative seemed designed to undermine Australia's protective tariffs. The visit of John Short Larke also did not go as planned, as he was met with a protectionist press, warning "[t]he measure of [Larke's] continuous success will also be the measure of our suicidal folly." Only the colony of New South Wales heeded the plead of Larke to help Ottawa subsidize Huddart's struggling steamship line. The Eastern Extension Company, which operated a telegraph service linking Australia to Egypt and thence to Europe, promoted widespread opposition to the whole idea of a Pacific Cable. The only sign of Australian interest in trade with Canada disappeared abruptly when exploratory talks between Larke and the premier of Victoria were suspended pending Federation of Australia.

Still, from the Canadian perspective, there seemed every reason to persevere. Despite initial financial reverses, the Canadian-Australian Steamship Line managed to establish a regular shipping service. Bilateral trade, though still minuscule, slowly increased as a result. Canadian exports to Australia—principally timber, canned salmon and manufactured farm implements—tripled in value between 1892 and 1900. Moreover, Canada enjoyed a tidy surplus: in 1900, it exported over $1.6 million worth of goods to Australia in exchange for imports worth only $660,000. Facilitated by regular steamship and cable connections, commerce between the two British dominions seemed certain to expand following the federation of the Australian colonies in January 1901. Canadian exporters encouraged Canada's Liberal prime minister, Sir Wilfrid Laurier, to take advantage of these developments, which he did by appointing a second trade commissioner to Australia in 1903.

The new trade commissioner, D.H. Ross, made little progress with the Australians. Most of Australia's exports to Canada were agricultural and so were already admitted free of duty; it had little need for the kind of broad reciprocal trade deal desired by the Laurier government. Instead, Australia suggested that the two countries negotiate an agreement that covered a very limited number of items. Protectionist sentiment, whose influence on Australian policy was magnified by a series of unstable minority governments, further complicated negotiations. These dragged on inconclusively for much of the decade, slowly straining Canada's patience. When Australia failed to respond promptly to a 1909 offer to conclude a treaty on the narrow basis it favoured, Ross erupted with exasperation:

"From several successive Ministers, I have heard [such] strong expressions of sympathy towards the desires of the Canadian Government in regard to preferential trade that I am almost inclined to think that such sentiments are nothing more than empty platitudes."

Laurier shared his trade commissioner's indignation and, as trade relations with the United States began to show evidence of a new vigour, he became less interested in concluding a trade agreement with Australia. Few Australians were probably surprised by Laurier's change of heart; many were already convinced that "within a few years Canada [would] either be an independent republic or an integral part of the United States." Indeed, with their broad Yankee accents and populist attitudes, Canadians seemed more American than British. Canada's efforts to reconcile these two influences on its national life increasingly led to friction with Australia over the nature of relations within the Empire. The imperial outlook that fostered Canada's interest in Australia also spawned a number of proposals for some form of imperial federation. Advocates of such schemes pointed out that federation would allow the dominions an opportunity to reconcile their interests with imperial foreign and defence policy. In exchange, they would assume a small share of the financial burden associated with defending the empire. In Australia, particularly after the South African War, this imperialist vision was embraced with considerable sympathy. Isolated by the vast Pacific Ocean, where German, French and Japanese imperialism seemed to roam unchecked, imperial federation offered Australia an opportunity to ensure that its interests were kept front and centre when British decision-makers tinkered with the disposition of the empire's naval resources. Canadians, on the other hand, were disillusioned by the Boer War and were increasingly alarmed by the notion of imperial federation. The country's significant French-Canadian minority, profoundly North American in outlook and sceptical of Britain's imperial mission, viewed the imperial connection as a trap whose only purpose was to force the self-governing dominions to assume greater responsibility for imperial defence.

By common consent, the prime ministers of Britain's self-governing Dominions skirted this contentious issue at the 1902 Colonial Conference. The question, however, could not be avoided indefinitely. Frustrated by his repeated inability to persuade Britain to eject France from its possessions in the New Hebrides, the Australian prime minister, Alfred Deakin, arrived in London for the 1907 Colonial Conference determined to change the very basis on which the empire was organized. He proposed that the conference create an Imperial Council that would assume responsibility for the general shape of imperial defence and foreign policy. A secretariat would carry out agreed policy and facilitate communications between meetings. Laurier was unconvinced. Aware that closer imperial relations would inflame French Canadian opinion, Laurier charged the Australian with endangering dominion self-government. The debate raged for days, but Laurier, whom Deakin later denounced for his "fifth-rate part in the Conference", defiantly stood his ground. For the moment, this fundamental difference over how the empire might be organized precluded close relations. Even the election in 1911 of a Conservative and imperially minded prime minister, Sir Robert Borden, had little immediate impact on Canada's wary approach to imperial issues. However, the swirling passions that accompanied the outbreak of the First World War in August 1914 swept away many Canadian doubts about the value of the Empire. The country plunged into battle alongside Australia and the other overseas dominions. The war revived the debate over imperial organization. This time, Canada and Australia were firmly united in pursuit of identical goals.

The First World War placed Dominion governments in an awkward position. Although they remained responsible for the nature of their national contribution to the allied cause, Britain retained complete control over strategy and high policy. During the initial stages of the conflict, when it was thought that the war would only last a few months, this state of affairs was perfectly acceptable. But as the war dragged on and its horrifying scale became apparent, a number of Dominion premiers became restive and uneasy. During a visit to London in 1915, Borden began to wage a campaign intended to force the British government to keep the Dominions more fully informed of the war's progress. Early the following year, the newly elected Australian prime minister, W.M. "Billy" Hughes, joined Borden's crusade. After a brief meeting in Ottawa, the two agreed on a broadly similar set of dominion objectives. Borden and Hughes proved a formidable team. They readily convinced the wily British prime minister, David Lloyd George, of the need to establish formal mechanisms to facilitate consultation between Britain and the Dominions. An Imperial War Conference invited dominion prime ministers to consider the general problem of imperial relations, while an Imperial War Cabinet gave them a direct voice in the conduct of the war. The initial struggle for greater Dominion status was successfully concluded in April 1917 when the Imperial War Conference recognized "the Dominions as autonomous nations of an Imperial Commonwealth... [with a right to] an adequate voice in foreign policy and foreign relations." A year later, this theoretical expression of Dominion sovereignty assumed practical significance when Borden and Hughes joined forces again to secure separate Dominion representation at the Paris Peace Conference.

The success enjoyed by Hughes and Borden in demonstrating that British and Dominion interests could be accommodated within a single imperial foreign policy, provided a temporary basis for continued Australian-Canadian cooperation. From the start, however, the postwar relationship was tense. Hughes approached the Paris peace talks determined to enhance Australian security by annexing the former German New Guinea. Borden was preoccupied with maintaining, as the one positive result of the war, continued Anglo-American cooperation. A breach in the Canadian-Australian relationship over the fate of Germany's Pacific colonies was only narrowly averted when officials devised a compromise that satisfied both Hughes' desire to annex New Guinea and Borden's wish not to alienate American president Woodrow Wilson, who was committed to the principle of self-determination.

Borden's successor as prime minister, Arthur Meighen, was not so lucky. There could be no disguising the differences that divided Australia and Canada over the question of renewing the Anglo-Japanese Treaty of 1902. In Australian eyes, this mutual defence pact remained the best, and perhaps the only effective, guarantee against Japanese aggression. However, Washington strongly opposed the treaty, which effectively excluded it from a major role in policing the Pacific. Although Meighen was a staunch imperialist, he could not ignore the fact that renewing the Anglo-Japanese alliance would almost certainly strain Anglo-American relations and force Canada into the untenable position of having to choose between its two major allies. Given the issues at stake, Meighen and Hughes arrived in London for the 1921 Imperial Conference, each resolved to have his own way. Hughes opened the conference by defiantly insisting on the treaty's immediate renewal. Over the course of the next few days, the Australian cause was championed by an array of British imperial talent that included Lord Curzon, the Foreign Secretary, and Arthur Balfour, the Lord President of the Council. Undaunted, Meighen charged dramatically ahead. Canada, he declared, had "a special right to be heard," for, in the event of war between the United States and the Empire, Canada "[would] be the Belgium." No possible form of this treaty, he continued, would satisfy the United States. The Empire had no choice but to scrap the offending treaty.

The Australian prime minister was outraged. He questioned Meighen's interpretation of American opinion; he objected to having imperial policy dictated by Washington; and he scornfully dismissed American naval power. He poured ridicule on Meighen:

"What does he [Meighen] offer us? Something we can grasp? What is the substantial alternative to the renewal of the Treaty? The answer is none...Now let me speak plainly to Mr. Meighen on behalf of Australia...If he will look at his own [defence] budget and ours he will see what it means to have a great nation like America as his neighbour, under whose wing the Dominion of Canada can nestle safely...I must regard Mr. Meighen's presentation of the case as not the case for the Empire, but as the case for the United States of America."

But in the end, the Canadian view prevailed. At the Washington Conference in 1921 the Anglo-Japanese Treaty was replaced with the Washington Naval Treaty, a virtually unenforceable set of multilateral disarmament agreements designed to strengthen Pacific stability. The treaty compelled the Royal Australian Navy to scuttle their flagship battlecruiser HMAS Australia, whereas the Canadians did not have any capital ships of their own. The new arrangement was cold comfort in Australia, where the Canadian victory rankled for a long time to come. A Liberal protégé of Laurier, William Lyon Mackenzie King, was elected in December 1921. Unlike his predecessor Meighen, an imperialist at heart who opposed the Anglo-Japanese Treaty only as a matter of necessity, King shared his mentor's determination to avoid all external entanglements that would weaken the bonds between French and English Canada. During his first years of office, he asserted Canada's right to control its own foreign policy to suit Canada's interests better. When it was decided to convene an imperial conference in the spring of 1923, King resolved to use the occasion to repudiate the notion of an imperial foreign policy. The prospect of challenging the British Empire during his first overseas assignment filled the self-effacing prime minister with dread. "I am filled with terror," he confided to his diary, "at the thought of having to speak many times and [at] my inability to work out themes."

What King lacked as a public speaker, he more than made up for in dogged persistence. No sooner had Lord Curzon introduced the question of imperial foreign policy than the Canadian prime minister rose in his place to declare his government's intention to "pursue a foreign policy of its own." The new Australian Prime Minister, Stanley Bruce, quickly confronted King. Bruce rejected the idea that each part of the Empire might shape a foreign policy of its own. "If the discussion continues on the present basis," he exclaimed, "we are going to achieve nothing at all with regard to consultation on foreign affairs." That, of course, was precisely King's objective, and as the conference proceeded, he opposed every effort to reach agreed positions on individual questions of foreign and defence policy. In these detailed discussions, King and Bruce clashed once again. The Australian's repeated efforts to secure Canadian support for a resolution endorsing Britain's plans for the defence of Singapore and the Suez Canal were turned aside. By the end of the conference, King's victory was complete. In a final burst of activity, he amended the meeting's concluding resolution on foreign relations to reflect his conviction that imperial conferences were consultative not policy-making bodies. King's success ended the experiment with a common foreign policy and signalled the emergence of the modern Commonwealth. It also added to the growing gulf separating Canada and Australia. King's attitude towards the Empire was incomprehensible to many Australian observers. The young R.G. Casey, then serving as an Australian liaison officer in London, watched the Canadian prime minister with bewildered fascination:

"Surely no one man can claim credit for having done so much as Mackenzie King to damage what remains in these autonomous days of the fabric of the British Empire. His efforts to make political capital out of his domestic nationalism are analogous to a vandal who pulls down a castle in order to build a cottage."

The subject of trade, which was increasingly bound up in the debate over the imperial connection, was equally divisive. The failure to conclude a commercial treaty had not materially harmed bilateral trade. Indeed, the war provided a tremendous boost to the sale of Canadian forestry products, metal manufactures and auto parts in Australia. However, access to this market, which became more important as a postwar recession deprived Canada of its American sales, was threatened. In 1921, Australia introduced steep new tariffs on Canadian newsprint at the same time as it announced its readiness to conclude trade treaties with members of the British Empire. In October 1922, Mackenzie King's minister of trade and commerce, James Robb, set out for Australia in renewed pursuit of a bilateral trade agreement.

The Australians proved to be tough bargainers. As was the case during earlier rounds of negotiations, there was little incentive for them to conclude a reciprocal trade agreement. Australian officials also resented Mackenzie King's reluctance to seek a broad imperial solution to the postwar slump in trade. In their view, any agreement with Canada would merely assist American subsidiaries operating in the Dominion at the expense of companies from Britain. For over two years, the discussions dragged on before Canadian negotiators were forced to give in to Australian demands in order to preserve the market for British Columbia's forestry products. In exchange for receiving important concessions on canned salmon, auto parts and paper, Canada reduced its duties on Australian meat and butter and increased the margin of preference enjoyed by Australian dried fruit. The 1925 agreement was soon the source of some controversy. It was strenuously opposed by Canadian farmers, who feared new competition from imported Australian meat and butter. Canada's conciliatory prime minister fretted about the accord which caused this noisy debate and condemned the minister responsible. Mackenzie King's liberal philosophy was offended by the prospect of raising Canadian tariffs on imports from third countries in order to give Australia an increased margin of preference for dried fruit. Moreover, these provisions were aimed primarily at the United States just as trade between the two North American countries had begun to recover. The prime minister gave the accord only lukewarm support, and no sooner had the agreement been approved than he delighted in crippling one of its main provisions. An Australian program to promote the export of butter was found guilty on a technicality of violating Canada's anti-dumping legislation in early 1926. King rejected the Australian prime minister's repeated pleas for understanding and insisted on imposing punitive duties. When, later in the decade, a slump in international trade began to pinch at Canadian exports to the United States, F.L. McDougall, a close advisor to the Australian prime minister, gleefully waited for depression "to drive Mackenzie King into a much more helpful attitude towards Empire economic cooperation."15 In anticipation, perhaps, Australia appointed its first trade commissioner to Canada, R.A. Haynes, in 1929.

Within a year, depression had indeed arrived, and Canadian voters had dismissed Mackenzie King. From the opposition benches, he watched the new, Conservative prime minister, R. B. Bennett, embrace suggestions for an imperial trade bloc. Enthusiasm for imperial preferences surged through the 1930 Imperial Conference and, before the formal discussions had ended, Canada and Australia had agreed to seek a closer trading arrangement. Negotiations were speedy and painless. On his way home from London, the Australian minister for markets and transport, Parker Moloney, stopped in Ottawa to explore the new agreement's main features. He and Bennett agreed that it would rest on two principles: first, domestic producers in fields where the two countries were competitors would be given adequate protection; second, "a strong effort should be made by each Dominion to divert to the other goods which it did not produce and was currently importing from foreign countries."

Under the terms of the 1931 trade agreement, Canada was accorded the benefits of Australia's British preferential tariff on 425 out of the 433 items in the Australian tariff.17 Canada also secured important concessions on timber and agricultural implements. In return, Canada extended to Australia the benefits of its own British preferential tariff and increased the margins of preference enjoyed by Australian raisins and currants. The agreement's impact on bilateral trade was dramatic but one-sided. Between 1931 and 1935, Canadian exports to Australia almost tripled, and Canada's share of the Australian market jumped from 2.3% in 1931 to 5.7% in 1935. Canada opened a second trade commissioner's office in Australia in 1936.

Australian trade did not fare nearly so well under the new agreement. Between 1931 and 1935, Australian exports to Canada increased by less than 50%. Some important Australian exports, including butter, meat and canned fruit, actually declined during this period. Australia pressed Ottawa to extend the agreement but met with little success. Australia's discontent with Canadian trade policy increased sharply when Mackenzie King was re-elected in 1935. The depression had strengthened Mackenzie King's traditional opposition to imperial preferences, and he was anxious to seek freer trade with the United States. The 1935 Canada–United States trade agreement, which diminished the value of Australia's preference on dried fruit, was hardly calculated to endear Canada to Australian policy-makers, whose devotion to imperial preferences remained undiminished. In the spring of 1936, Canada paid the price for its poor reputation in Canberra when Australia unveiled its new "trade diversion policy". In an ill-fated effort to secure its markets in Britain and to balance its trade with the United States, Australia proposed drastically limiting its imports. Worried that Canada might become an alternate source for restricted American products, Australia included Canada in its program. "Here", declared Canada's outraged under-secretary of state for external affairs, "[was] economic nationalism with a vengeance."

The 'trade diversion' controversy subsided when Washington managed to convince the Australian cabinet to drop the plan. Neither the ravaging depression nor German or Japanese aggression in the late 1930s could unite the two countries after years of division. Canada suggested that the two countries exchange high commissioners in order to encourage a closer "exchange of views". These proposals were rejected as "inopportune". Australia was against exploring new forms of representation which would limit British control in the Empire, while Canada scoffed at such a Colonial view. This was certainly not an unfair caricature of Canadian policy. Mackenzie King, aware of the strain that depression and the threat of war placed on national unity, studiously avoided international commitments. Canada's fate, he insisted, would be decided by Parliament alone. The Canadian attitude was unsettling and seemed to indicate that Canada no longer shared Australia's interest in co-operating with the British Commonwealth, a suspicion which seemed confirmed by the meagre results of the 1937 Imperial Conference. On the eve of war, Mackenzie King stood fast against Australia and its prime minister's efforts to secure a final declaration of imperial solidarity.

=== Awkward allies: 1939 to 1968 ===
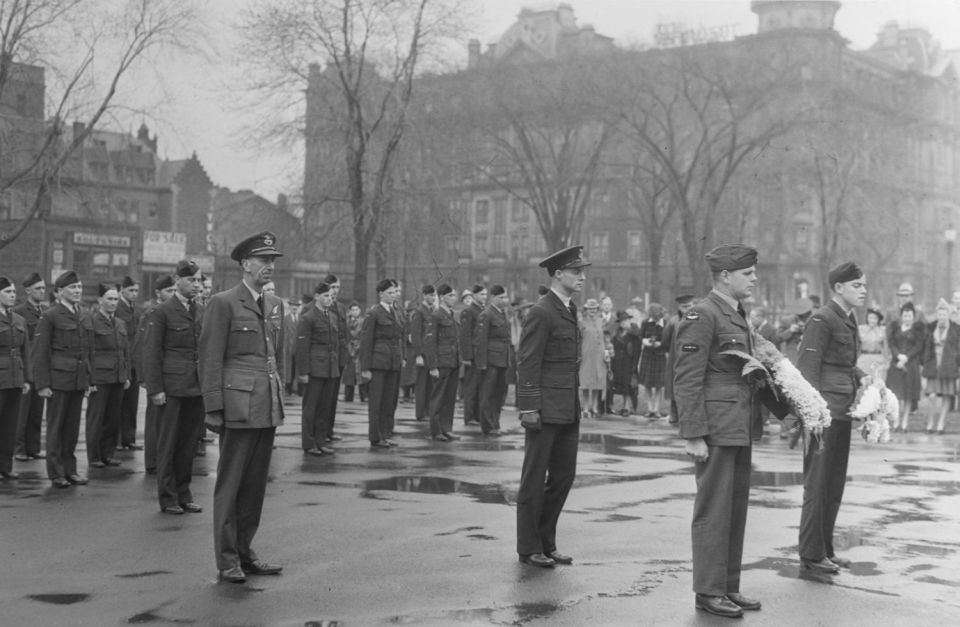
Ceremony for Anzac Day, a national day of remembrance in Australia and New Zealand, held in Montreal, Quebec, Canada in 1941

Mackenzie King's ambiguous attitude towards Britain and its Empire disappeared with the outbreak of war in September 1939. A united Canada hurried to join Australia at Britain's side. The war heralded a new era in Canadian-Australian relations and gave the partnership an increasingly important political character. This transformation began smoothly. In the first days of the war, Canada renewed its suggestion that the two countries exchange High Commissioners and Australia readily approved of a step that now appeared to affirm imperial unity. A businessman and former minister of defence, Sir William Glasgow, was quickly sent to Ottawa to head the new mission. At the same time, the Australian and Canadian High Commissioners in London, Stanley Melbourne Bruce and Vincent Massey respectively, took the lead in organizing support for the British Commonwealth Air Training Plan, the centrepiece of Canada's early war effort. This gesture of Commonwealth solidarity, under which some 9,400 Australian airmen trained in Canada, did not go unappreciated. "The possibility of promoting better relations and more cooperation...is much better now than it was two years ago," Canada's first High Commissioner to Australia, Charles Burchell, reported in May 1941. Burchell's optimism was premature. Japan's entry into the war in December 1941 created widespread fear in Australia that the country might be overrun. Canada's apparent lack of interest in the Pacific War drew considerable criticism in the Australian press. Misled by Burchell's inexperienced successor, Major-General Victor Odlum, into believing that Canada was ready to assist Australia with men and munitions, the Australian Minister of External Affairs, Herbert Evatt, submitted an anxious request for help. Constrained by its war effort in Europe, Ottawa was unable to respond positively. Undeterred, the minister renewed his plea during a brief visit to Ottawa in April 1942. Again, despite some initially favourable indications, Canada could not meet the Australian request. Canadian assistance, when it was finally offered as part of Canada's multilateral Mutual Aid program in May 1943, did little to improve Australia's view of its Commonwealth colleague. Ottawa insisted that Australia agree to reduce its tariffs and trade barriers at the end of the war before it would actually send any aid. Only after a good deal of bickering did the two countries manage to effect a compromise in early 1944.

These bilateral tensions were partly moderated by the web of personal relationships that the war spawned between officials in the two governments. As a result, recalled one Canadian diplomat, "[t]here developed a collaboration in international organizations so habitual that it was taken for granted by the 1950s." These officials quickly discovered a mutual interest in making certain that the concerns of the small and middle powers in the postwar international system were not ignored by the great powers. Canada and Australia, however, differed on how to achieve this. For the Australian prime minister, John Curtin, the solution lay in transforming the Commonwealth into an institution that would rival the major powers in stature and influence. Canadian officials were suspicious of suggestions for closer Commonwealth consultation, which they feared might limit Canada's flexibility in dealing with the United States. Mackenzie King took an even dimmer view of Curtin's ideas. Such notions, he fumed, were part of a "deliberate design... to revive an imperialism which left the Dominions something less than national sovereignty" and represented "an attack on his personal position." The difference in approach was even greater at the United Nations where Evatt enjoyed a free hand in shaping Australian policy. The outspoken and combative foreign minister preferred to attack head-on the privileges enjoyed by the great powers. At the U.N.'s founding conference in San Francisco in 1945, he stubbornly opposed every clause in the U.N.'s charter that seemed to weaken the new organization or that gave the major powers undue influence. While some Canadian officials quietly admired Evatt's determination to strengthen the U.N., most were dismayed by his confrontational tactics. As Cold War tensions reduced the likelihood that the great powers would achieve a sufficient level of cooperation to ensure the survival of the U.N., discretion seemed the greater part of valour.

This difference in approach was so profound that Mackenzie King refused to meet Evatt to discuss their views on the great powers' efforts to secure a veto in the Security Council. Instead, he sent his heir apparent, the stately and dignified minister of justice, Louis St. Laurent. The meeting was unsuccessful. Evatt considered St. Laurent "a pawn in a move to defeat the Australian case" and dismissed him as "an American stooge." The bilateral relationship remained tense during the immediate postwar period. This partly reflected the disruptive influence of Evatt, who continued to irritate Canadian diplomats and politicians. His success at pressing Australia's claim to the "Commonwealth" seat on the U.N.'s first Security Council in 1946 was particularly galling. More significantly, this tension reflected very different security concerns. Australia, haunted by the spectre of a reconstructed Japan, was anxious to press ahead with a peace settlement that would remove this threat. At a conference in Canberra in September 1947 it sought the support of its Commonwealth partners to push the process ahead. Ottawa, however, was dismayed by the Australian bid to re-fashion a Commonwealth bloc. Washington was almost certain to resent the Australian demarche, which seemed likely to jeopardize Anglo-American cooperation as the cold war erupted in Europe. This sharp geographic difference in focus, which only increased in 1948 when Canada joined in the discussions that resulted in the North Atlantic Treaty Organization, diminished the possibility of bilateral cooperation. Indeed, by the late-1940s, relations were so strained that they became the object of gentle derision in Ottawa. After a meeting with Princess Elizabeth and the infant Prince Charles, Lester B. Pearson confessed to his diary the "hope that relations... were not further disturbed by the fact that I was able to make the baby laugh while [J.B.] Chifley [Curtin's successor as prime minister] was not."

The triumph of communism in China and the outbreak of war along the Korean Peninsula in June 1950 transformed the postwar landscape. The Cold War spilled beyond its European origins and emerged as a global phenomenon with a unique Asian dimension. Once again, Australian and Canadian troops found themselves fighting together, this time in Korea under the auspices of the United Nations. However, good relations remained elusive. The defeat of Chifley's Labor government and the election of Robert Menzies' conservative coalition threatened to make things worse. Ottawa worried that the new government's aggressive anti-communism and its increasingly suspicious attitude towards Indonesia might inhibit the West's ability to secure Cold War allies among Asia's newly independent states. Australia was equally critical of Canada's cautious approach to the desperate challenges facing Asia. Percy Spender, the coalition's first minister of external affairs, held Canada partly responsible for the frustrating delays he encountered in establishing an aid program for Southeast Asia. Spender's "brutal and eccentric" tactics in pursuit of what eventually became the Colombo Plan were deeply resented in Ottawa. The tense international situation left little room for such disputes. Growing allied tension over the strategy to be pursued in response to Chinese intervention in the Korean War threatened the Anglo-American harmony upon which both Canada's and Australia's foreign policy was predicated. A new Australian minister of external affairs, Richard Casey, set out to tackle this problem when he was appointed to his post in the spring of 1951. An experienced diplomat, who had served in both London and Washington, Casey possessed a clear conception of the role that Canada and Australia might play in the Anglo-American relationship. He lost no time in making Pearson aware of his views:

"There is a wide field of potential co-operation and understanding between Australia and Canada, in which our two countries, working together, could be an effective force for the reconciliation of interests between the United States and Britain and an element of stability in the United Nations and the world in general."

Although Pearson was amused by Casey's "old Etonian, striped-pants manner", he was charmed and impressed by the Australian's "almost Boswellian ingenuousness." The close relationship that developed between Casey and Pearson provided the basis for a stable partnership whose effects lasted well into the 1960s. For the Australian foreign minister, whose country's isolated location prompted an enduring fear that its Anglo-American allies might become too focused on the Soviet threat in Europe, Pearson became an important source of information on developments in the North Atlantic Treaty Organization (NATO). In exchange, Casey regularly sent Pearson copies of his confidential diaries containing frank comments on his travels through Asia and on discussions in the Southeast Asia Treaty Organization (SEATO). A succession of crises in Asia provided a host of opportunities for bilateral cooperation. For instance, when Canada agreed to sit on the three international control commissions established in 1954 as part of an effort to contain conflict in Indo-China, contacts between Australian and Canadian representatives became "very close and continual." Casey and Pearson also came to form the core of a small group of powers that quietly sought a solution to one of the principal obstacles to Asian stability, Communist China's continued exclusion from the international community.

The interest each minister exhibited in the other's country fostered the development of the relationship. By the mid-1950s, there was a flurry of new bilateral activity. In 1954, for example, the two countries' departments of immigration, aware that each confronted similar problems in settling the wave of postwar European immigrants, established the first of many inter-governmental exchange programs. At the same time, stimulated by the postwar economic boom, officials began to dismantle those tax barriers that discouraged investors from seeking new investment opportunities in the other country. By the end of the decade, Canadian direct investment in Australia had more than doubled. The quickening pace of bilateral relations attracted the attention of Pearson's cabinet colleagues. In 1955, Canada's ubiquitous "minister of everything", C. D. Howe, visited Australia in his capacity as deputy prime minister. Howe's visit, which led to a 1959 agreement on nuclear cooperation, heralded a slow but steady stream of Canadian visitors that culminated in 1958 when John Diefenbaker became the first Canadian prime minister to visit Australia. A good many of these visitors were struck by Australia's potential as a market for Canadian products. Canadian exports had remained stagnant for most of the 1950s, constrained by the import restrictions that Australia imposed to protect sterling's weak foreign exchange position. This hiatus gave the booming Australian economy an opportunity to redress its perpetual trade deficit with Canada and exports to Canada doubled during the decade.38 As Australia gradually liberalized its import regulations in the late 1950s, there were grounds to hope that the warm political partnership might secure preferential access for Canadians to this strong economy. After two years of discussions, which were complicated by Canadian efforts to protect its dairy and agricultural industries, a new trade agreement with most of the substantive provisions found in its 1931 predecessor, came into effect in June 1960. When combined with Australia's decision to lift the last of its import restrictions, its effect on trade was dramatic. In three years, Canadian exports to Australia almost doubled from $54.2 million in 1959 to $105 million in 1962. By 1964, they had jumped to almost $146 million.

With commercial relations growing progressively closer, the two countries' political objectives began to diverge. In part, this was caused by the changing importance the postwar Commonwealth played in each country's foreign policy. The Australian prime minister seemed especially unhappy with the modern Commonwealth. The accession of large numbers of Asian and African countries had destroyed the comfortable club of the inter-war period. In Menzies' view, the Commonwealth had been "modernized out of existence" and transformed into something that "no longer expresses unity but exists chiefly to ventilate differences." In contrast, Canada embraced the boisterous and multiracial Commonwealth as an integral part of its foreign policy. It promised the more established country a forum in which to exercise its influence and offered access to new perspectives on international developments. There was never any question that Ottawa would risk its standing in this new Commonwealth by trying to ease Australia's growing isolation. By 1961, for instance, Canada was prepared to help force South Africa out of the Commonwealth despite clear indications that such action would strain its relations with Australia. Similarly, Ottawa rejected Menzies' efforts in the spring of 1963 to foster closer bilateral relations lest other members of the Commonwealth, particularly India and Pakistan, feel excluded.

The 1960s developed another uncomfortable factor in relations between the two countries: the war in Vietnam. Australia had come to depend on the United States in the South Pacific for its own security as it was the foremost Western power in the pacific. This new relationship was initially rooted in the 1951 Pacific Security Agreement and subsequently defined through their common membership in SEATO. Australia increasingly shared Washington's desire to curb communism in Asia, and slowly found itself dragged into the quagmire of southeast Asia. By 1967, the few advisers Australia had sent to South Vietnam had basically become a full combat division. Australia's growing attachment to Washington's Asia policy proved to reduce Canberra's capacity and inclination to function as a middle power under the weight of America. Because of this, Canadian officials designated Australia with less importance. Moreover, Asia began to emerge as an active source of continuing bilateral tension. Canada had always been sceptical of applying the European doctrine of containment to Asia. By the mid-1960s, Canadian scepticism had changed to opposition as the strategy failed and conflict flared in Vietnam. The Canadian secretary of state for external affairs, Paul Martin, was soon embroiled in the search for an end to the war in Vietnam. His efforts, which included an ill-fated initiative to bring Peking's influence to bear on the U.N.'s deliberations, were deeply resented in Canberra. Australians wondered why their former ally was no longer fighting beside them in defence of freedom. Sadly, recorded the Canadian high commissioner in 1968, the war in Vietnam had come to "impose an emotional barrier between us."

=== Pacific partners: 1968–present ===
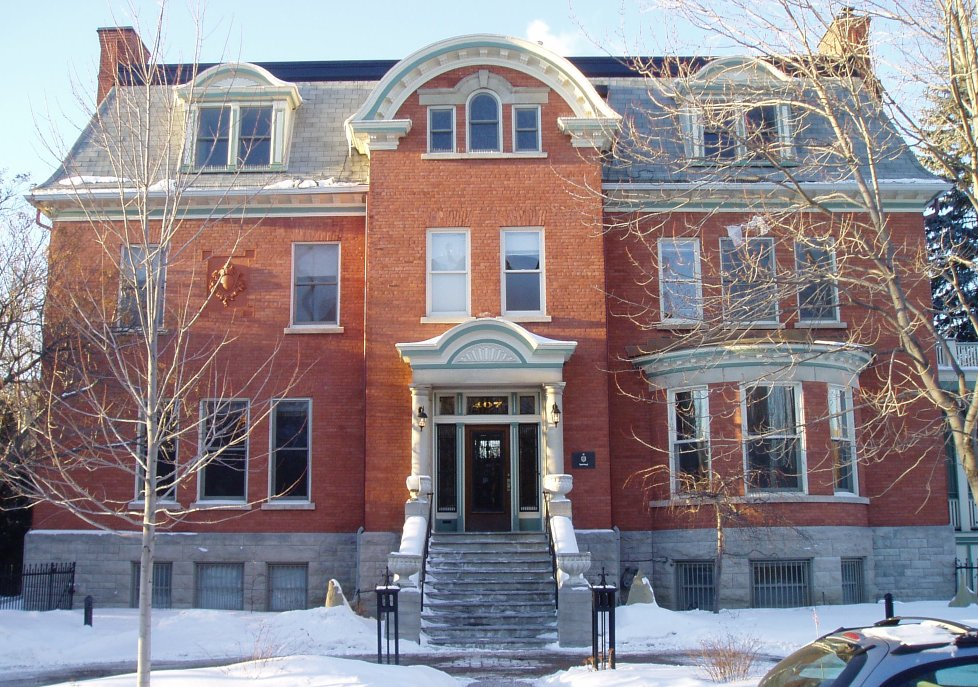
Australia House in Ottawa.

Monthly value of Australian imports from Canada (A$ millions) since 1988

Monthly value of Australian merchandise exports to Canada (A$ millions) since 1988

With the appointment of Pierre Trudeau as Prime Minister in the spring of 1968, there was some hope that there could now be harmonious bilateral relations between Canada and Australia. Trudeau had long been an opponent of Canadian foreign policy and the amount of attention Canada lavished on the United States and Western Europe. He sought to extend Canadian diplomacy beyond its traditional range. Thus, Canada was one of the first Western powers to recognize the People's Republic of China and insisted that this was only part of a more broadly based review of Canada's approach to the Pacific region. The Australian foreign minister, Paul Hasluck, found Trudeau's interest in Asia encouraging; he and his officials were cautiously optimistic that the new government, unlike the old, might embrace the Australian perspective on the crises in Asia before proceeding to recognize China.

Despite objections from Australia and other key allies, Canada recognized China. The war in Vietnam also continued to divide Canberra and Ottawa. Thus the Canadian effort to redefine its presence in the pacific continued to run around these central issues with Australia. When Jean-Luc Pepin, the minister of industry, trade and commerce, sought Australian agreement for a regular program of ministerial visits in order to revitalize the relationship, he met with little interest. In dismissing Pepin's demarche, the Australian minister for foreign affairs was blunt: "[Canada] could not expect to make much headway in [its] relations with Pacific Rim countries if [it] persisted in seeking relations with Communist China." Trudeau fared little better when he visited Australia in 1970. The continuing crisis in Southeast Asia cast a long shadow over the discussions. Although Trudeau managed to secure a pledge from his Australian host "to hold high-level consultations," it seemed clear that Australian officials and politicians were hardly enthusiastic about Canada and its new prime minister.

When reviewing the matter with Arthur Menzies, Canada's long-serving and trusted high commissioner in Canberra, Australian politicians complained loudly that Trudeau had made no effort to understand Australia's perspective on Indo-China. Menzies' conclusion was disturbing: "Until circumstances arise in which some effective Canadian initiative can be taken in helping to end the hostilities in Indochina, I think that we will find ourselves still rather far apart from the Australians." Indeed, when Trudeau declared that the plug could be pulled on the Indian Ocean for all he cared, Australian officials made it clear that they "now wished that [Trudeau] had never concerned himself with them."

Many of the differences separating the two countries diminished in 1972 though with the election of Gough Whitlam as Prime Minister of Australia's first Labor government since the 1940s. Whitlam had been skeptical of Australia's foreign policy, especially concerning its steadfast loyalty to the shrinking British Empire and faith in American globalism that appeared to be woefully mismanaged. Whitlam was determined to seek a new direction, and he looked to Canada, a country he had visited frequently in the 1960s as opposition leader. He admired Trudeau's determination in separating Canada from the United States and modernizing the Canadian constitution, which quickly led to an easy and natural rapport between the two leaders. Upon Whitlam's encouragement, many Australian officials traveled to Ottawa to study Canadian policy initiatives. These included the recognition of China, the new cabinet committee system, and policy on royal prerogatives and honours. Canadian officials were delighted to see a new interest in Canada from Australia, and were intrigued by Whitlam's attempts to carve out a more independent foreign policy from Britain, likely making it more dynamic in the Pacific and perhaps a useful partner.

Despite the Labor's party defeat in the 1975 general election, there was no need to qualify this assessment. Australia's new conservative Prime Minister, Malcolm Fraser, seemed to adopt a harder line on Cold War issues this his predecessor, Gough Whitlam, but shared his vision of a more independent foreign policy. Fraser also showed a renewed interest in the Commonwealth and created bilateral links with Japan, the ASEAN countries, South Korea and Communist China. Fraser's attempts to provide Australia with an opportunity to fulfill its leadership aspirations worried Ottawa. The growing economic and political presence of Australia in the Pacific led Paul Martin Sr., Canada's high commissioner to Britain, to fret that "Australia [would] steal a march over us" by assuming the lead in Commonwealth discussions on Southern Africa. Many Canadian observers though were excited by the re-establishment of Australia as a middle power willing to act constructively and decisively. Australia's enhanced profile in the Pacific confirmed Ottawa's inclination to view Australia as an increasingly important partner in Canada's efforts to increase trade with Japan and to ensure regional stability by supporting such organizations as ASEAN. During the late 1970s and early 1980s, Canada and Australia found themselves comfortably aligned not only when dealing with such Pacific questions as Cambodia's civil war, but also when confronted by crises in Southern Africa, Afghanistan and Poland.

This successful multilateral partnership had its bilateral dimension as official and unofficial contacts between the two countries multiplied in the late 1970s. Growing interest in each other's cultural and intellectual life, for example, led to the creation of the Canada–Australia Literary Award in 1976 (won by John Romeril in its inaugural year). At the same time, comparative studies in the two countries were more clearly defined when the Canadian-Australian Colloquium, the Canadian visiting fellowship at Macquarie University, and the Australian Association for Canadian Studies were established in 1981. Similarly, official contacts increased dramatically. In the first two months of 1977 alone, for instance, the two governments signed agreements on the exchange of information regarding energy research, aboriginal peoples, and crime prevention and criminal justice. By 1980, there were official exchange programs between Canadian and Australian departments responsible for statistics, aboriginal people, labour, justice and defence. Australia's only complaint—a traditional one—was that far too few Canadian politicians visited Australia. The problem soon disappeared. In one 18-month period in 1979–1981, the premiers of Ontario, British Columbia, Manitoba and Saskatchewan all travelled independently to Australia. They were followed by nine other federal and provincial cabinet ministers. In June 1981, the growing number of Canadian contacts with Australia prompted Ottawa to add a new consulate in Perth to its existing posts in Canberra, Melbourne and Sydney.

The sudden vigour of this relationship caught both countries by surprise. In both capitals officials seemed unaware of the complete range of bilateral contacts and the possibilities for further cooperation. As a consequence, neither Australia nor Canada seemed able to measure the importance of individual issues against the value of the entire relationship. As the long postwar economic boom gave way to a series of recurring economic challenges in the late 1970s, both governments tended to scratch out economic advantage where they could. While Ottawa barred the importation of Australian meat to protect Canadian farmers, Canberra denied Canadian airlines landing rights in Australia. Some officials worried that the web of connections that bound the two countries together might be severed one at a time without anyone ever noticing.

The solution clearly lay in creating some kind of mechanism that would ensure that individual issues, however important in themselves, were placed within the context of the broader relationship. Australian officials agreed. When the Australian foreign minister, Andrew Peacock, expressed keen interest in exploring new bilateral initiatives in 1980, Canada seized the occasion to press for a formal mechanism that would provide overall direction. Australia hesitated. Recalling an earlier and easier era, Canberra wondered whether more might be lost than gained in institutionalizing the relationship. In the end, Australia agreed that relations had become too important to be managed through simple ad hoc consultations. In September 1982, the two countries agreed to create a Senior Officials Committee (SOC) that would meet annually to oversee the relationship.

Senior officials from both countries met in Canberra for the first time in June 1983. The gathering, according to a Canadian report, appeared an immediate success:

Canadian-Australian policy talks [were] held...on relaxed and forthright basis and were adjudged to be successful and useful...Both sides saw value of talks in re-establishing or restoring very close working cooperation between Canada and Australia which had perhaps broken down a bit due to neglect.

This robust assessment was perhaps overstated. Certainly, during the following decade, the SOC found it impossible to eliminate the tendency in both capitals to disregard the overall relationship in pursuit of more limited objectives. Similarly, the committee was not always able to bridge the very real differences that emerged in the 1980s over such questions as Pacific security or multilateral trade. What the committee did provide, however, was a framework and a context for partnership. Its very creation reflected a conscious decision by both Canada and Australia to pursue as mature and independent nations a relationship that began in the 1890s as a simple by-product of Britain's Victorian Empire.

== Defence history and relations ==
Canada's and Australia's militaries have fought alongside each other numerous times including World War I, World War II, the Korean War and many United Nations Security Council-sanctioned missions.

The Battle of Kapyong is one of the many—and most prolific—examples of Australian and Canadian forces fighting together within a close proximity. The Korean War battle which occurred between 22–25 April 1951, saw the 3rd Battalion, Royal Australian Regiment (3RAR) and the 2nd Battalion, Princess Patricia's Canadian Light Infantry (2 PPCLI) engaged in a ferocious defensive action against a Chinese force outnumbering them at least 5 to 1.

Australian casualties were 32 killed, 59 wounded and 3 captured whilst Canadian losses were 10 killed and 23 wounded. 3RAR and 2PPCLI were each awarded both the United States Presidential Unit Citation and Korean Presidential Unit Citation for their actions during the Battle of Kapyong.

To maintain this strong military relationship, a Canadian Defence Advisor is stationed at the High Commission in Canberra to share intelligence. Australia and Canada both contributed the International force in East Timor and both worked together to fight terrorism in Afghanistan.

In December 2017, Australian Defence Minister Marise Payne announced that eighteen F/A-18A Hornet aircraft would be sold to Canada after officials cancelled an F/A-18F Super Hornet order from the United States. The first two aircraft are expected to be handed over to the Royal Canadian Air Force in early 2019.

Following his 2026 speech at Davos, Mark Carney made the first visit of a Canadian Prime Minister to Australia since 2007 where he addressed the Australian parliament and met with Australian Prime Minister Anthony Albanese to strengthen joint partnerships amidst global uncertainty. Both leaders emphasised their countries' links and the need for middle powers to work together in the 'new world order'.

Australia and Canada signed a $2.5 billion deal for an advanced over-the-horizon radar system in June 2026, marking the first overseas sale of the Australian technology. The system extends detection range beyond conventional radar and will support Canada's Arctic surveillance, strengthening bilateral defence cooperation.

== High-level visits ==
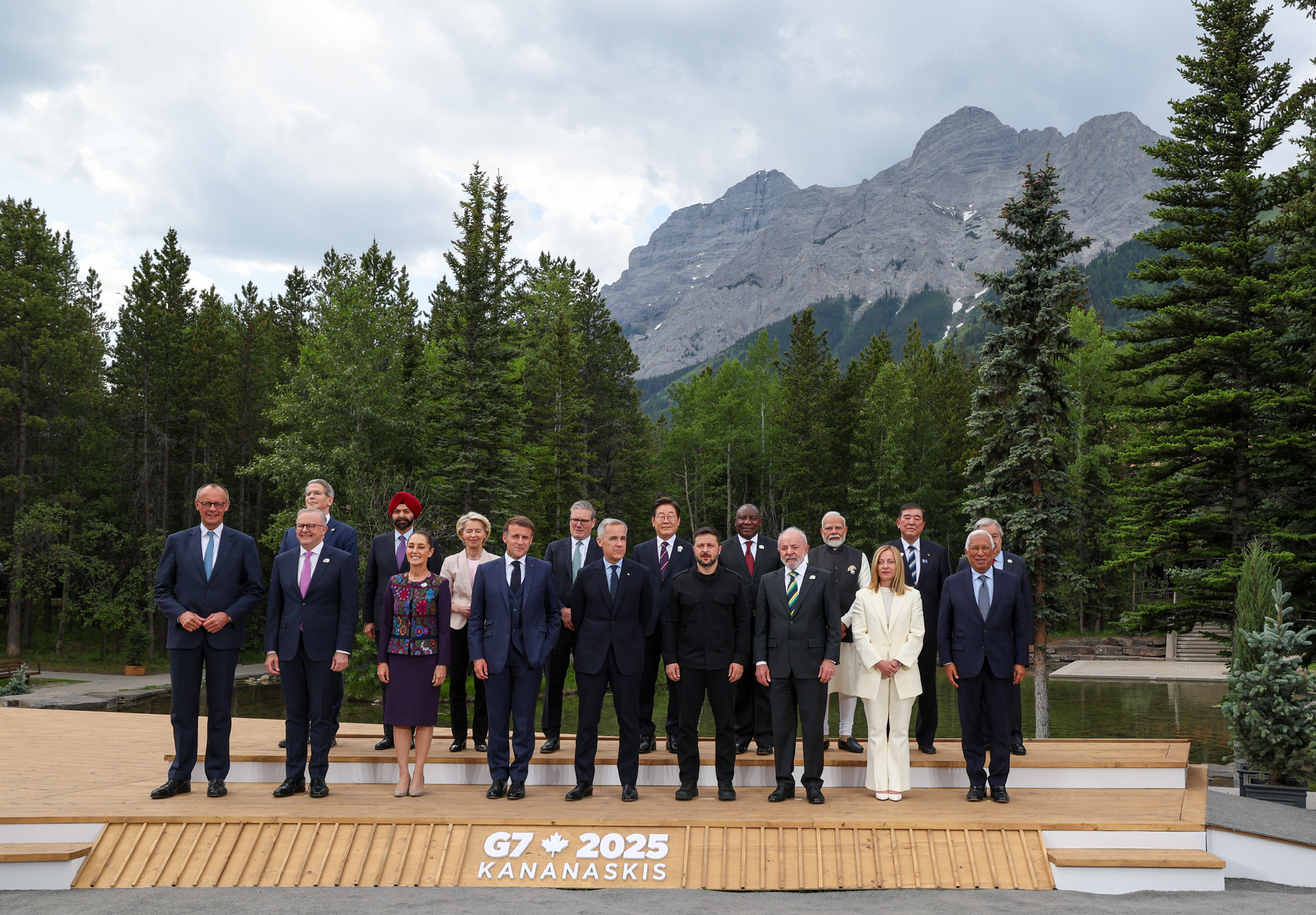
Prime Ministers Anthony Albanese and Mark Carney (along with other world leaders) in Kananaskis, Canada; June 2025.

High-level visits from Australia to Canada

- Prime Minister Robert Menzies (1941, 1959)
- Prime Minister John Curtin (1944)
- Prime Minister Harold Holt (1967)
- Prime Minister John Gorton (1969)
- Prime Minister Gough Whitlam (1974)
- Prime Minister Malcolm Fraser (1976, 1981)
- Prime Minister Bob Hawke (1985, 1987)
- Prime Minister John Howard (2006)
- Prime Minister Tony Abbott (2014)
- Prime Minister Anthony Albanese (2025)

High-level visits from Canada to Australia

- Prime Minister John Diefenbaker (1958)
- Prime Minister Pierre Trudeau (1970)
- Prime Minister Jean Chrétien (1995, 2002)
- Prime Minister Stephen Harper (2007, 2011, 2014)
- Prime Minister Mark Carney (2026)

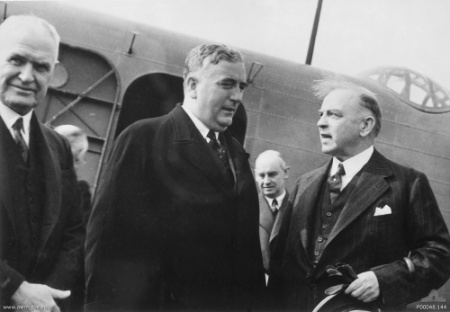
Prime Ministers Robert Menzies and William Lyon Mackenzie King in Ottawa; May 1941.

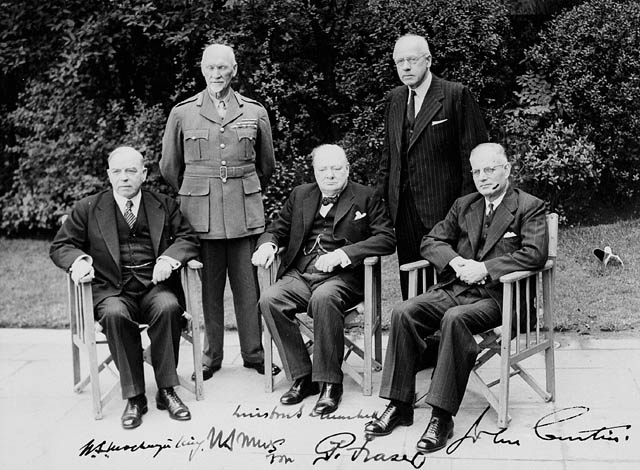
Prime Ministers of Canada W.L. Mackenzie King and of Australia John Curtin, along with the Prime Ministers of Britain, New Zealand and South Africa in London; May 1944.

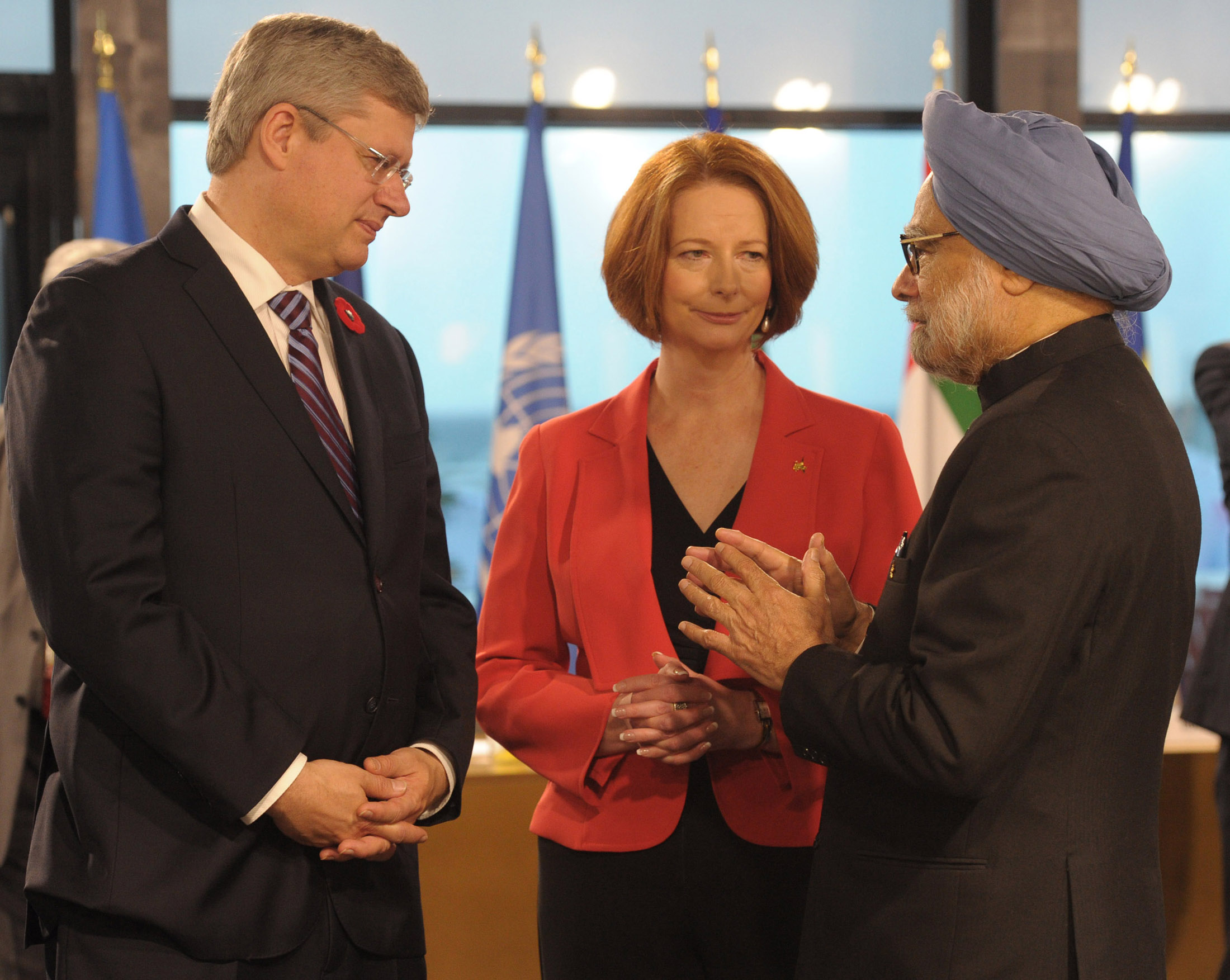
Prime Ministers Stephen Harper of Canada, Julia Gillard of Australia and Manmohan Singh of India in Cannes, France; November 04, 2011.

== Contemporary economic relations ==
In 2010, Australia was Canada's 16th largest destination for its merchandise, Canada ranked the 23rd largest for Australian merchandise. Bilateral merchandise trade levels for 2010 were (CAD) $3.4 billion with exports from Canada to Australia reaching $1.8 billion and exports from Australia to Canada reaching $1.6 billion.

Canada's Merchandise Trade with Australia 2015

	Canadian Imports from Australia		Canadian Exports to Australia	
	Merchandise Classification	% of total imports	Merchandise Classification	% of total exports
1	Meat and edible meat offal	19.33	Boilers, mechanical appliances, etc.	24.66
2	Beverages, spirits and vinegar	14.0	Salt, sulfur, earths, lime, stone, cement	6.80
3	Pearls, precious stones or metals	12.86	Aircraft and spacecraft	6.42
4	Inorganic chemicals, precious metals	9.38	Electrical machinery and equipment	6.35
5	Boilers, mechanical appliances, etc.	8.29	Meat and edible meat offal	5.27
6	Optical, medical, scientific, technical instrumentation	8.13	Optical, medical, scientific, technical instrumentation	4.65
7	Ores, slag and ash	4.36	Pharmaceutical products	4.26
8	Pharmaceutical products	3.15	Motor vehicles, trailers, bicycles, motorcycles	3.41
9	Motor vehicles, trailers, bicycles, motorcycles	2.68	Wood and wood articles, charcoal	3.37
10	Electrical machinery and equipment	1.96	Inorganic chemicals, precious metals	2.77
	% of Total from Australia	84.24	Top 10 as % of Total To Australia	67.95
	Australian Imports as % of Cdn Total	0.31	Australian Exports as % of Cdn Total	0.35

== Migration and tourism ==
Today over 50,000 people born in Canada live in Australia (Canadian Australians) with similar numbers of Australians in Canada (Australian Canadians). In recent years there has also been growing support for the idea of freedom of movement between the UK, Canada, Australia, and New Zealand with citizens able to live and work in any of the four countries, similar to the Trans-Tasman Travel Arrangement between Australia and New Zealand.

Australia and Canada have reciprocal working holiday visa arrangements with each other. The two have a similar scheme with several other countries, excluding their respective close neighbors New Zealand and the United States. The working holiday program encourages cultural exchange and closer ties between arrangement countries by allowing young people to have an extended holiday supplemented by short-term employment. In recent years, schools in Australia, New Zealand and Canada have also started collaborating on student exchange programs for Indigenous students from these three countries. In 2018, Australia and Canada were both founding members of the Pacific Rim trade agreement CPTPP (Comprehensive and Progressive Agreement for Trans-Pacific Partnership). Chapter 12 of the agreement expanded the Australian and Canadian visa relationship into the high-level professional and corporate sectors. Unlike youth visas which are often capped and aimed at cultural exchange, the CPTPP provides a dedicated pathway for business visitors, intra-corporate transferees, investors, and professionals by removing major administrative hurdles. Specifically, it eliminates Labour Market Testing (the requirement for employers to prove no local worker is available) and removes quotas for these specialized roles, streamlining the movement of executives and skilled technicians between the two nations.

In 2015, Australia was the sixth largest source of tourism to Canada, with 307,123 Australian citizens visiting the country that year. It ranked only behind China in terms of visitors coming from the Asia-Pacific region. In 2019, Australia was also the third largest source of tourism for British Columbia, which is the closest Canadian province to Australia, and the only one which borders the Pacific. 246,490 Australians visited the province that year, placing it behind China (which had 333,837 visitors to British Columbia) and the United States (which had over six million visitors). The skiing town of Whistler in British Columbia has been nicknamed "Whistralia" or "Little Australia" due to its large number of Australian tourists. In 2011, an estimated 34% of the town's workforce were Australian.

In 2016, Canada was the 14th largest source of tourism to Australia, with 152,000 Canadian visitors that year. It ranked as the 12th most visited foreign country by Canadians, and was one of only three Asia-Pacific countries in the top 15, alongside China and Hong Kong. Canada was forecasted to be a handful of countries which will surpass its pre-pandemic tourism levels to Australia in 2025. The other countries in this category were New Zealand, China, Japan, Singapore, the United States and Italy.

There are direct flights between both nations with Air Canada and Qantas.

== Treaties ==
As of 2017 there are 29 Australia–Canada bilateral treaties that cover trade, atomic energy, and science. The Canada–Australia Consular Services Sharing Agreement provides for the sharing of consular assistance in certain circumstances.

== Opinion polls ==
A 2012 GlobeScan survey of 22 countries suggested that Australians, along with Americans, had the most favourable view of Canada's influence to the outside world.

According to a 2020 poll by the Lowy Institute, Canada is the most positively perceived country by Australians, with a 79% positivity rating, down from 84% in 2018. A 2020 poll by the Macdonald–Laurier Institute similarly showed that Australia, at 71%, was the most positively viewed country by Canadians. In the 2022 version of the Lowy Institute poll, Canada was the second most positively viewed country by Australians, with an 80% rating. They ranked behind New Zealand in the poll, who garnered a rating of 86%.

== Resident diplomatic missions ==
of Australia in Canada

- Ottawa (High Commission)
- Toronto (Consulate-General)
- Vancouver (Consulate)

of Canada in Australia

- Canberra (High Commission)
- Sydney (Consulate-General)

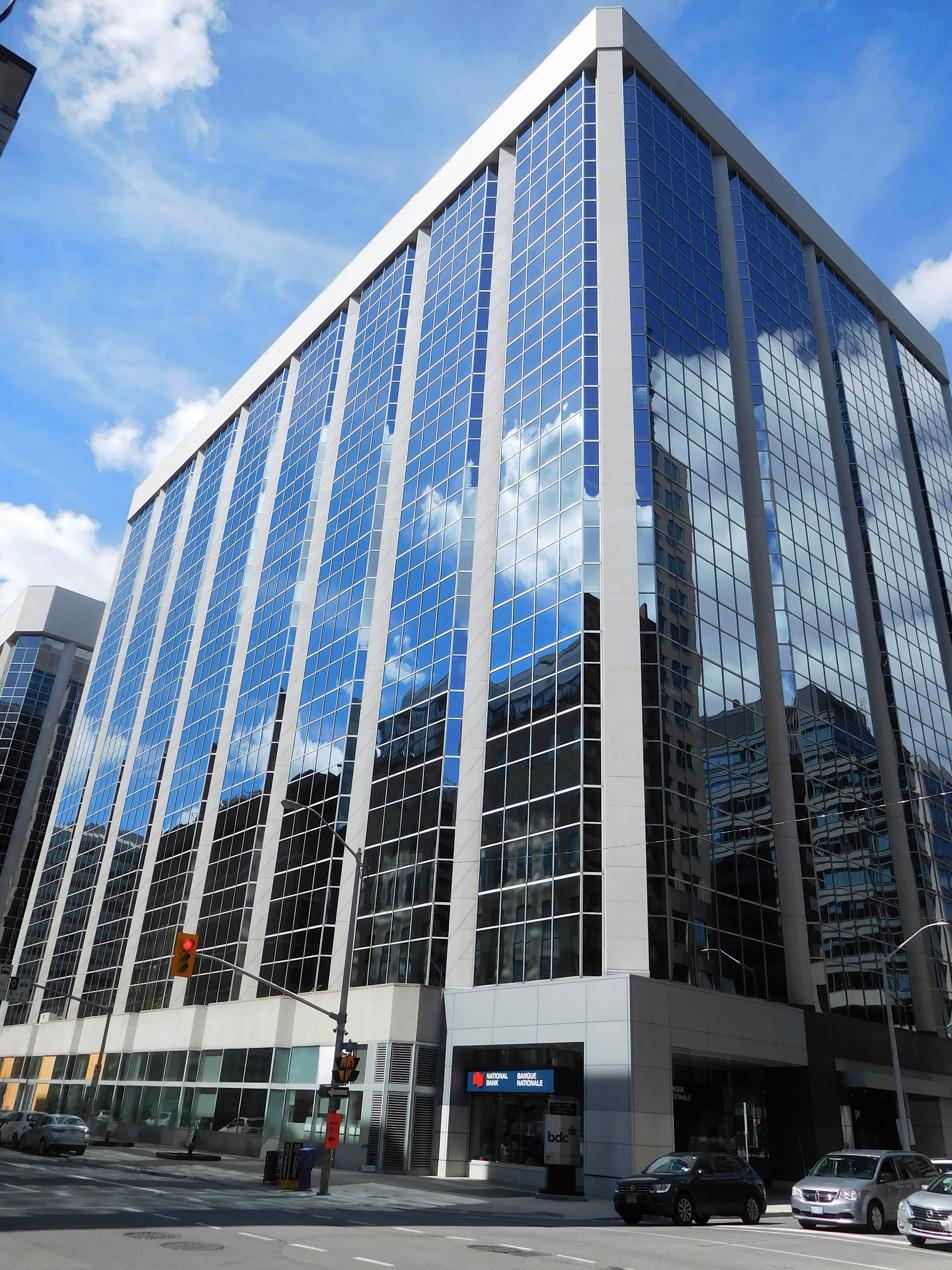
Building hosting the Australian High Commission in Ottawa

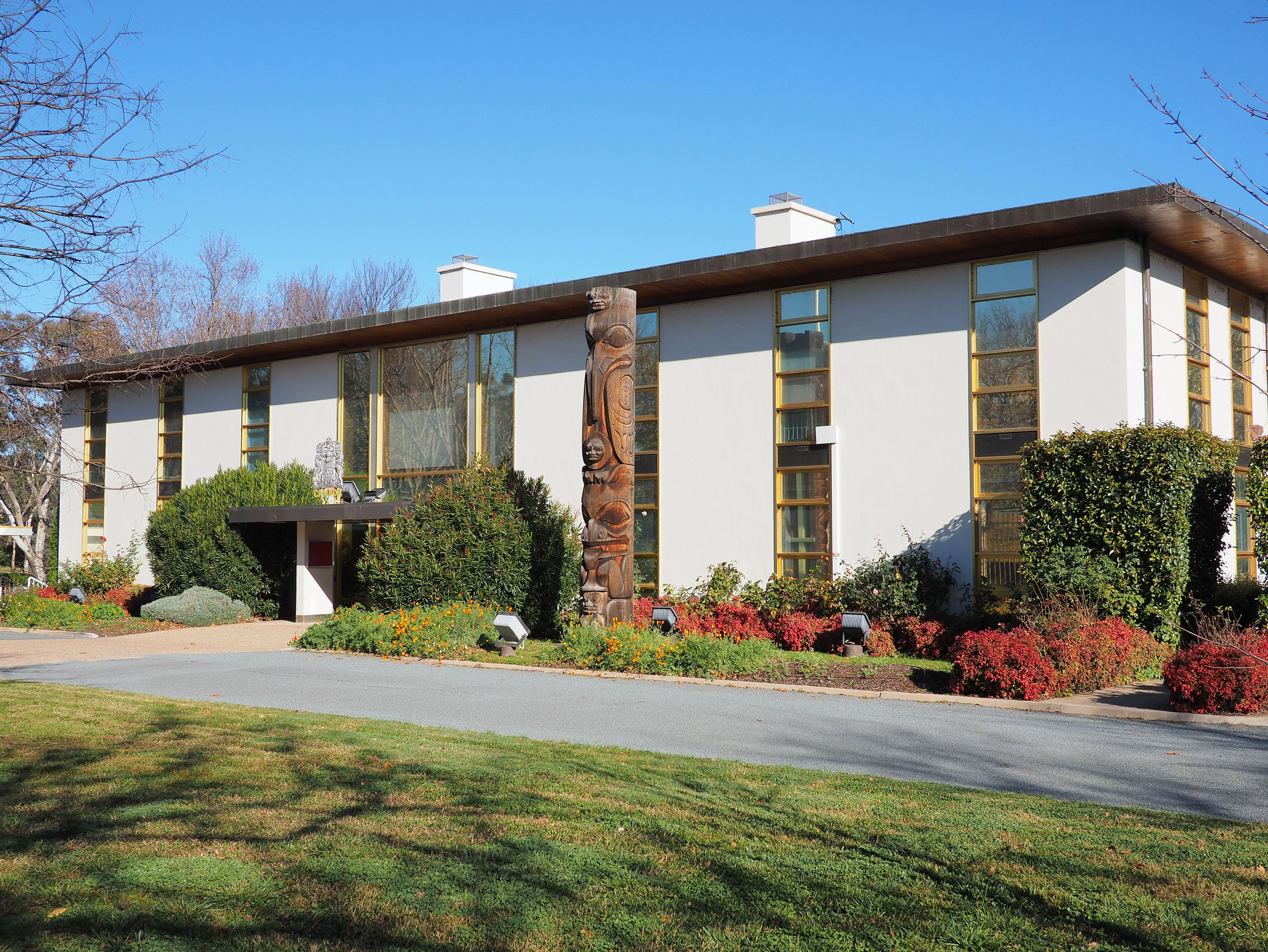
Canadian High Commission in Canberra

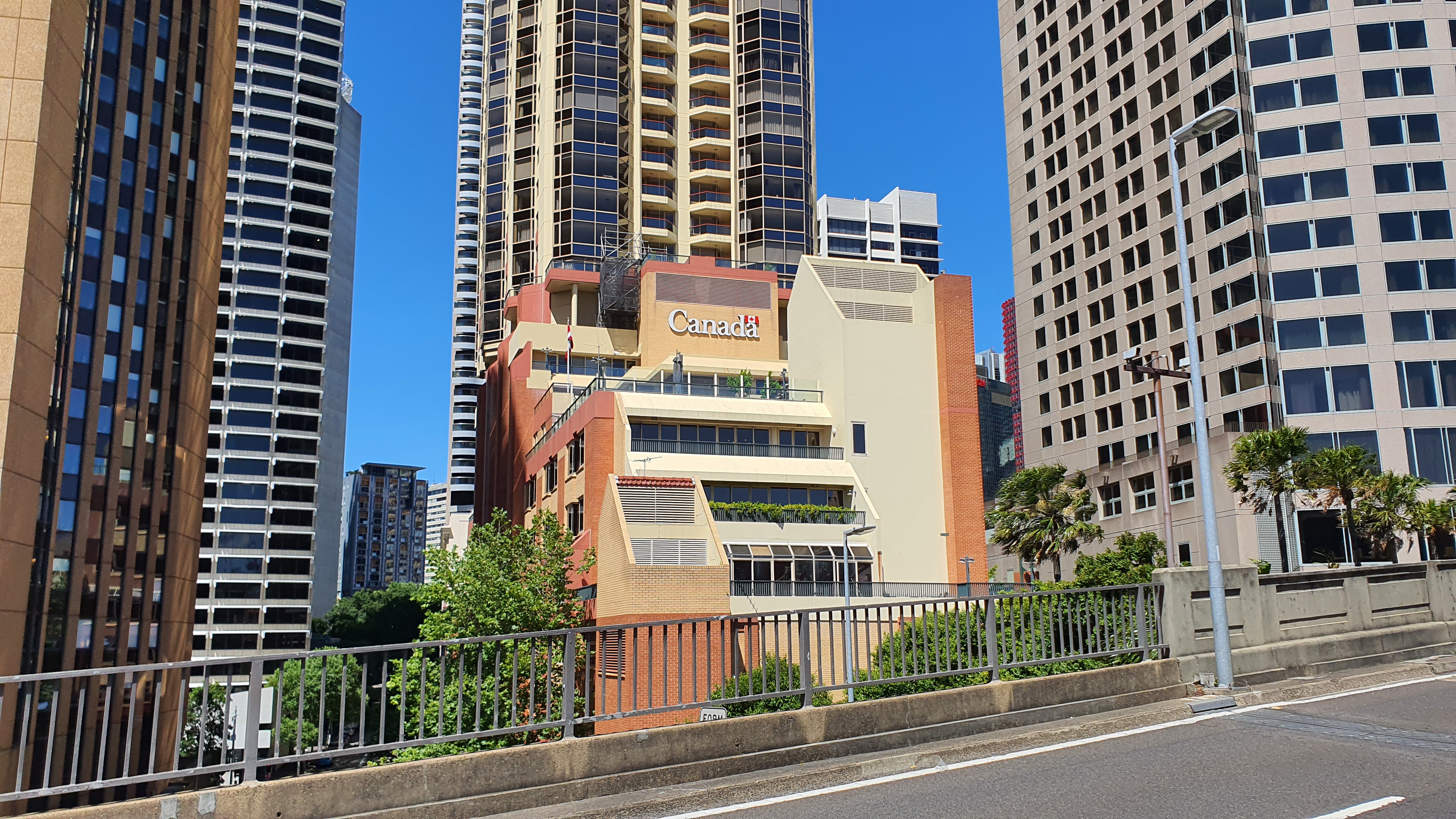
Canadian Consulate-General in Sydney

== Twin towns and sister cities ==
=== Current affiliations ===
- (Victoria (state)) Baw Baw, Victoria and Barrhead, Alberta
- Cairns, Queensland and Sidney, British Columbia
- Canada Bay, New South Wales and Chateauguay, Quebec
- Central Highlands, Queensland and Altona, Manitoba
- Geraldton, Western Australia and Geraldton, Ontario
- Great Lakes, New South Wales and Stroud, Ontario
- Jabiru, Northern Territory and Leaf Rapids, Manitoba
- Port Stephens, New South Wales and Victoria, British Columbia
- (Victoria (state)) Mildura, Victoria and Brockville, Ontario
- Mount Isa, Queensland and Kamloops, British Columbia
- (Victoria (state)) Southern Grampians, Victoria and Hamilton, Ontario
- Stroud, New South Wales and Innisfil, Ontario
- Warwick, Queensland and Camrose, Alberta
- Weddin, New South Wales and Grenfell, Saskatchewan

=== Former affiliations ===
- (Victoria (state)) Campaspe, Victoria and Whitehorse, Yukon

== See also ==
- AUSCANNZUKUS
- Australian Canadians
- Canada–Australia salmon trade dispute
- Canada–Australia Consular Services Sharing Agreement
- Canadian Australians
- High Commission of Australia in Ottawa
- High Commission of Canada in Australia
- List of high commissioners of Canada to Australia
- List of high commissioners of Australia to Canada
