= Canadian High Commissions =

List of Canadian diplomatic missions to Commonwealth states

Canadian High Commissions are Canadian diplomatic missions in the capitals of Commonwealth states. High Commissions are the equivalent of embassies in non-Commonwealth states.

== History ==
The new dominion of Canada and the colonies which preceded it had effectively engaged in diplomacy with Britain, particularly to promote their interests in immigration and economic matters, despite not being sovereign states. In 1868, the Canadian Parliament sent Sir John Rose, 1st Baronet, as a "quasi-official representative" to Britain, and in 1878, with its growing political interests, Canada requested to send a full-time "resident minister to London" to engage in diplomacy with the British government. The Colonial Office was amenable but felt that Canada's subordinate position in the British Empire precluded diplomatic status (Note: There were a number of reasons that Britain could not receive a Canadian diplomat. Diplomats represent foreign heads of state, and Canada was part of the British Empire and therefore not foreign. Canada's high commissioners were subjects of the British monarch, and could not have diplomatic immunity or precedence, and it would be nonsensical for the monarch's government to approve or accredit a diplomat to itself.) and the diplomatic title "minister", and after some correspondence, Britain agreed to Canada's request for the title of "high commissioner", chosen to ensure that foreign governments understood its holder's importance. Alexander Tilloch Galt was the first to hold the position (1880–1883).

Canada's example was followed by other dominions of the British Empire and by 1918 they each had a high commissioner in London. Following the First World War, most of the dominions became founding members of the League of Nations and entitled to send diplomatic ambassadors to non-Commonwealth states. At Canada's suggestion, Britain sent a high commissioner to Canada in 1928, taking over much of the governor general's responsibilities. Canada exchanged high commissioners with other dominions during the Second World War, and afterwards with the newly-independent states of South Asia. (Note: India, Pakistan and Ceylon.) However, there was little engagement with the other dominions and the high commissioners perceived themselves to have inferior status to Canada's ambassadors, eight of whom were posted by 1945. In 1948, members of the Commonwealth of Nations were established as "free and equal" and high commissioners gained equal status with ambassadors. In 1951, Canada began styling high commissioners as "excellency", and in 1954 granted diplomatic immunity to high commissioners.

== High Commissions ==
- High Commission of Canada, London

=== Africa ===
- High Commission of Canada, Abuja, Nigeria
- High Commission of Canada, Accra, Ghana
- High Commission of Canada, Banjul, Gambia
- High Commission of Canada, Dar es Salaam, Tanzania
- High Commission of Canada, Kigali, Rwanda
- High Commission of Canada, Lagos, Nigeria
- High Commission of Canada, Lusaka, Zambia
- High Commission of Canada, Maputo, Mozambique
- High Commission of Canada, Nairobi, Kenya
- High Commission of Canada, Pretoria, South Africa
- High Commission of Canada, Yaoundé, Cameroon

=== Americas ===
- High Commission of Canada, Bridgetown, Barbados
- High Commission of Canada, Georgetown, Guyana
- High Commission of Canada, Kingston, Jamaica
- High Commission of Canada, Port of Spain, Trinidad and Tobago

=== Asia ===
- High Commission of Canada, Bandar Seri Begawan, Brunei Darussalam
- High Commission of Canada, Colombo, Sri Lanka
- High Commission of Canada, Dhaka, Bangladesh
- High Commission of Canada, Kuala Lumpur, Malaysia
- High Commission of Canada, Islamabad, Pakistan
- High Commission of Canada, New Delhi
- High Commission of Canada, Singapore

=== Oceania ===
- High Commission of Canada, Apia, Samoa
- High Commission of Canada, Canberra, Australia
- High Commission of Canada, Tarawa, Kiribati
- High Commission of Canada, Wellington, New Zealand

The following Australian High Commissions in Oceania provide consular services to Canadian citizens under the Canada–Australia Consular Services Sharing Agreement:

- High Commission of Australia to Nauru
- High Commission of Australia to Papua New Guinea
- High Commission of Australia to Solomon Islands
- High Commission of Australia to Tonga
- High Commission of Australia to Vanuatu

== Commissioners ==
- List of high commissioners of Canada to Australia, 1939–present
- List of high commissioners of Canada to Barbados, 1966–present
- List of high commissioners of Canada to Belize
- List of high commissioners of Canada to Hong Kong, ?–1997
- List of high commissioners of Canada to India
- List of high commissioners of Canada to Newfoundland, 1941–1949
- List of high commissioners of Canada to New Zealand, 1940–present
- List of high commissioners of Canada to the United Kingdom, 1880–present

== See also ==
- List of diplomatic missions of Canada
