= SITEI =

- Frequency: Annually
- Locations: Abuja, Nigeria
- Inaugurated: 2012
- Most recent: July 19–20, 2017
- Participants: 500
- Website: SITEI

The SITEI (Sustainability in the Extractive Industries) Conference is an annual conference and workshop for key stakeholders and industry experts in extractive industries, which has been held in Abuja, Nigeria, since 2012.

== History ==
The SITEI Conference was established together with the Deputy High Commission of Canada in October 2012, in Lagos. Over the years, the conferences have been attended by business executives, the most senior government officers for the industries, and the representatives of various organizations.

At the 2015 conference, all the stakeholders including the Nigerian government endorsed plans to develop the mining industry of Nigeria. The 2017 conference grew to two days, featuring 25 speakers from the sector and 500 senior executives.

The conferences have been organized by sustainability consultancy CSR-in-Action in partnership with NEITI and the Nigerian Government Chapter of the global Extractive Industries Transparency Initiative (EITI). The main conveners have been Bekeme Masade of CSR-in-Action and Meka Olowola of Zenera Consulting, who is chairman of the SITEI Committee.

== Conference themes ==
Year	Theme
2012	Managing Your Value Chain
2013	Policy, Affirmative Action and Sustained Growth
2014	Local Content Participation, Accountability and Transparency
2015	Unlocking the Hidden Potential in the Extractive Industries
2016	Revitalising the Nigerian Economy Beyond Oil: Prospects for a Thriving, Export-Driven Extractive Sector
2017	Building Local for Global
2018	Using Extractives Technology to Promote Local Refining by 2019: A Sustainable Approach
