= Canada–Australia salmon trade dispute =

In the 1990s, a trade dispute over fresh salmon arose between the Commonwealth nations of Canada and Australia. In 1995, Canada made a complaint to the World Trade Organization, of which both countries are members, about Australia's restriction on imports of fresh salmon, which were part of a quarantine measure for health purposes.

WTO dispute resolution favored Canada, both in a 1997 panel decision and in a subsequent decision by the WTO Appellate Body. The WTO determined that the Agreement on the Application of Sanitary and Phytosanitary Measures (SPS Agreement) did not allow Australia's import ban. The WTO ordered Australia to lift its ban and increased quarantine requirements not only for salmon, but for imports of other species of fish as well. The parties settled their dispute in 2000.

== Salmon industry and origins of the dispute ==
In the 1990s, major world salmon exporters include Canada, Norway, Chile, Scotland, Sweden, Denmark, New Zealand, and Australia. In 1995, Australia had a 100 million AUD (75.1 million USD) salmon industry, with a total value of Australian salmon exports (mostly to east Asia, particularly Japan) of about 40 million dollars.

In 1975, Australia imposed a ban on imports of fresh salmon under a quarantine regulation intended to prevent entry of imported diseases into fish stock in Australia. Australia did allow imports of non-fresh salmon, including salmon that had been heat-treated by canning (see salmon cannery) or smoking, which reduces the risk of disease. In 1995, the annual value of such imports to Australia was about 52 million dollars, with almost half of these imports coming from Canada. Australian salmon had an advantage in Japanese and other markets, selling for premiums up to 20 percent over other imported fresh salmon, because of Australian environmental regulations.

In the 1990s, however, tensions arose between Canada and Australia over Australia's regulation, negatively affecting the two countries' relations. The Australians argued that the ban was justified on health grounds; the Canadians argued that there was no scientific evidence that Canadian fresh-salmon imports would be unsafe and that the ban was simply protectionism.

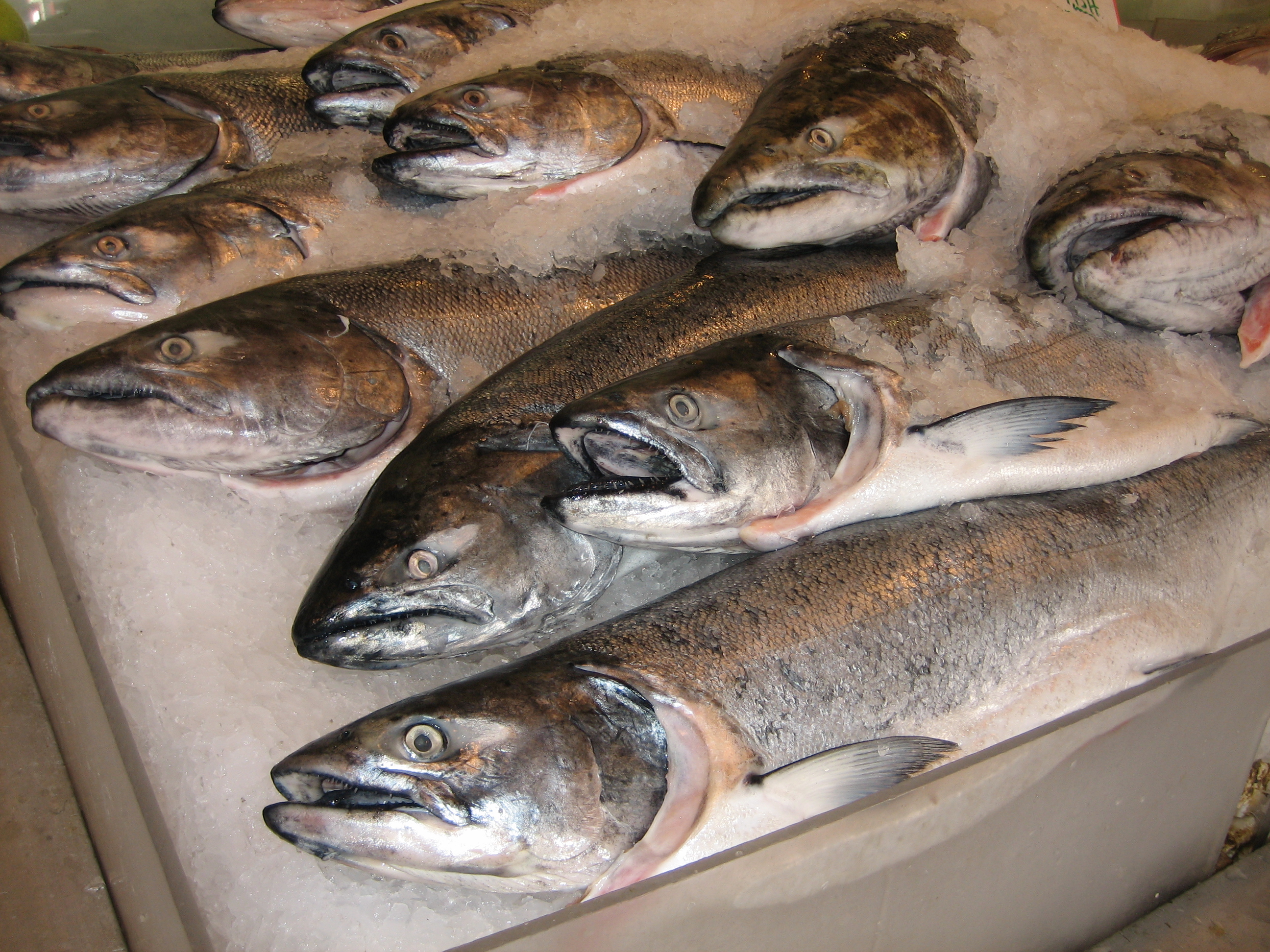
Salmon for sale at a fish market

== WTO case and settlement ==
In the 1990s, Canada brought a dispute to the World Trade Organization (WTO) against Australia regarding the importation of salmon. The official title of the case was Australia — Measures Affecting Importation of Salmon, Dispute DS18. The dispute was the first challenged under the 1994 Agreement on the Application of Sanitary and Phytosanitary Measures (SPS Agreement) reached following the 1994 Uruguay Round.

The case formally began with Canada's request for consultations in October 1995. Canada alleged that Australia's prohibition on Canadian salmon imports under the Australian quarantine regulation was inconsistent with the SPS Agreement and articles XI and XIII of the 1994 General Agreement on Tariffs and Trade (GATT).

Following requests from Canada to establish a panel, the DSB did so in April 1997. The European Communities, India, Norway, and the United States reserved their third-party rights. The panel was composed in May 1997, and the panel report circulated in June 1998. The panel determined that Australia's important ban was "inconsistent with Articles 2.2, 2.3, 5.1, 5.5, and 5.6 of the SPS Agreement, and also nullified or impaired benefits accruing to Canada under the SPS Agreement."

In June 1998, Australia filed a notice of its intention to appeal the panel's decision to the WTO Appellate Body. The Appellate Body report circulated in October 1998. The Appellate Body reversed the panel with respect to its reasoning on Articles 5.1 and 2.2 of the SPS Agreement, but found that Australia "had acted inconsistently" with those sections. The Appellate Body also broadened the panel's determination that Australia had acted inconsistently with Articles 5.5 and 2.3 of the SPS Agreement. Finally the Appellate Body "reversed the panel's finding that Australia had acted inconsistently with Article 5.6 of the SPS Agreement but was unable to come to a conclusion whether or not Australia's measure was consistent with Article 5.6 due to insufficient factual findings by the panel." The decision directed Australia not only to lift the ban on Canadian salmon, but also the quarantine requirements for several other species of fish.

The DSB adopted the Appellate Body report and the panel report, as modified by the Appellate Body report in November 1998. Australia expressed its intention to abide by the DSB's decision.

In December 1998, Canada requested arbitration under to Article 21.3(c) of the Dispute Settlement Understanding (DSU) "to determine the reasonable period of time for implementation of the recommendations of the DSB." The Article 21.3(c) Arbitration Report was circulated in February 1999; it determined that the reasonable period of time for implementation was eight months (i.e., the period ending on 6 July 1999).

After Canada brought this dispute to the WTO, Australia published the "1999 Import Risk Analysis" arguing that the import of frozen, fresh or chilled salmon is a health risk.

In 1999, Canada made requests under the DSU for a determination by the original panel of whether the implementation measures taken by Australia were consistent with WTO rules as determined in the dispute-resolution proceedings. At its meeting of 28 July 1999, the DSB agreed to take up Canada's request and referred the matter back to the original panel. The EC, Norway and the U.S. again reserved their third-party rights.

The compliance panel was composed in September 1999 and circulated its report in February 2000, finding:

- Due to delays in the entry into force of several implementing measures which extended beyond the reasonable period of time within which Australia had to implement the DSB recommendations, no measures to comply existed in the sense of Article 21.5 of the DSU in respect of a number of covered products and during specific periods of time. As a result, during those periods, Australia failed to bring its measure into conformity with the SPS Agreement in the sense referred to in Article 22.6 of the DSU.
- Australia, by requiring that only salmon product that is "consumer-ready" as specifically defined can be imported into Australia and released from quarantine, was maintaining sanitary measures that were not "based on" a risk assessment, which was contrary to Articles 5.1 and 2.2 of the SPS Agreement. The panel also considered the same requirement to be in violation of Article 5.6 of the SPS Agreement.
- Finally, the panel found that Australia violated Articles 5.1 and 2.2 of the SPS Agreement as a result of a measure enacted by the Government of Tasmania that effectively prohibits the importation of certain Canadian salmon product into most parts of Tasmania without being based on a risk assessment and without sufficient scientific evidence.

The DSB adopted the report of the compliance panel in March 2000.

In July 1999, before compliance proceedings began, Canada requested authorization from the DSB, pursuant to Article 22.2 of the DSU, to suspend concessions to Australia because of its non-compliance. Australia objected to Canada's proposed level of suspension of concessions and requested that the matter be referred to arbitration, pursuant to Article 22.6. The DSB agreed to this request, but the arbitration proceedings were suspended until after the compliance proceedings concluded.

At the DSB meeting of 18 May 2000, following the compliance panel's decision, and following discussion between the WTO and the governments of the two countries, sectors of each government and the panel, Canada announced that it had come to an agreement with Australia to bring the dispute to a close. The parties exchanged letters detailing the agreement. Under the agreement, "Canada would monitor closely Australia's commitment to implement the agreement" by 1 June 2000. The agreement became effective on schedule on 1 June 2000.

== Countries ==
=== Canada ===
The Canadian Food Inspection Agency (CFIA) verified that exported foods and food products meet Canadian standards just as an importing country would. Countries have their own requirements for foods and food products and the Canadian government understands this and respects those requirements. Canada has implemented the fish inspection act to help regulate the export of fish and fish products. The efforts Canada has put towards achieving a substantial export in their fish (salmon) shows speculation towards Australia.

=== Australia ===
Aquaculture in Australia is the country's fastest growing primary sector industry accounting for 34% of the countries seafood production. Salmon is a part of this movement across the country with Atlantic salmon becoming a mainstream fish produced through the aquaculture systems. Salmon farms are found in Tasmania, Victoria and South Australia and while they are making an effort to improve salmon farming offshore and inshore it is still producing a small amount of salmon for Australia.

Although the countries were developing a negative trade relationship, Australia values its long-standing close and productive relationship with Canada. Their trade relationship dates back over 100 years and the two countries continuously work together. Australian and Canadian military forces fought side by side in both World Wars, The Korean War and the 1990-91 Gulf War. Both countries have forces in Afghanistan making movements to stabilize that country as close military allies.

== See also ==
- Canadian Food Inspection Agency
- Aquaculture in Australia
- Food safety
- Fishery
- Aquaculture of salmonids
- Salmon as food
- Australia-Canada relations
