= Dean McFadden =

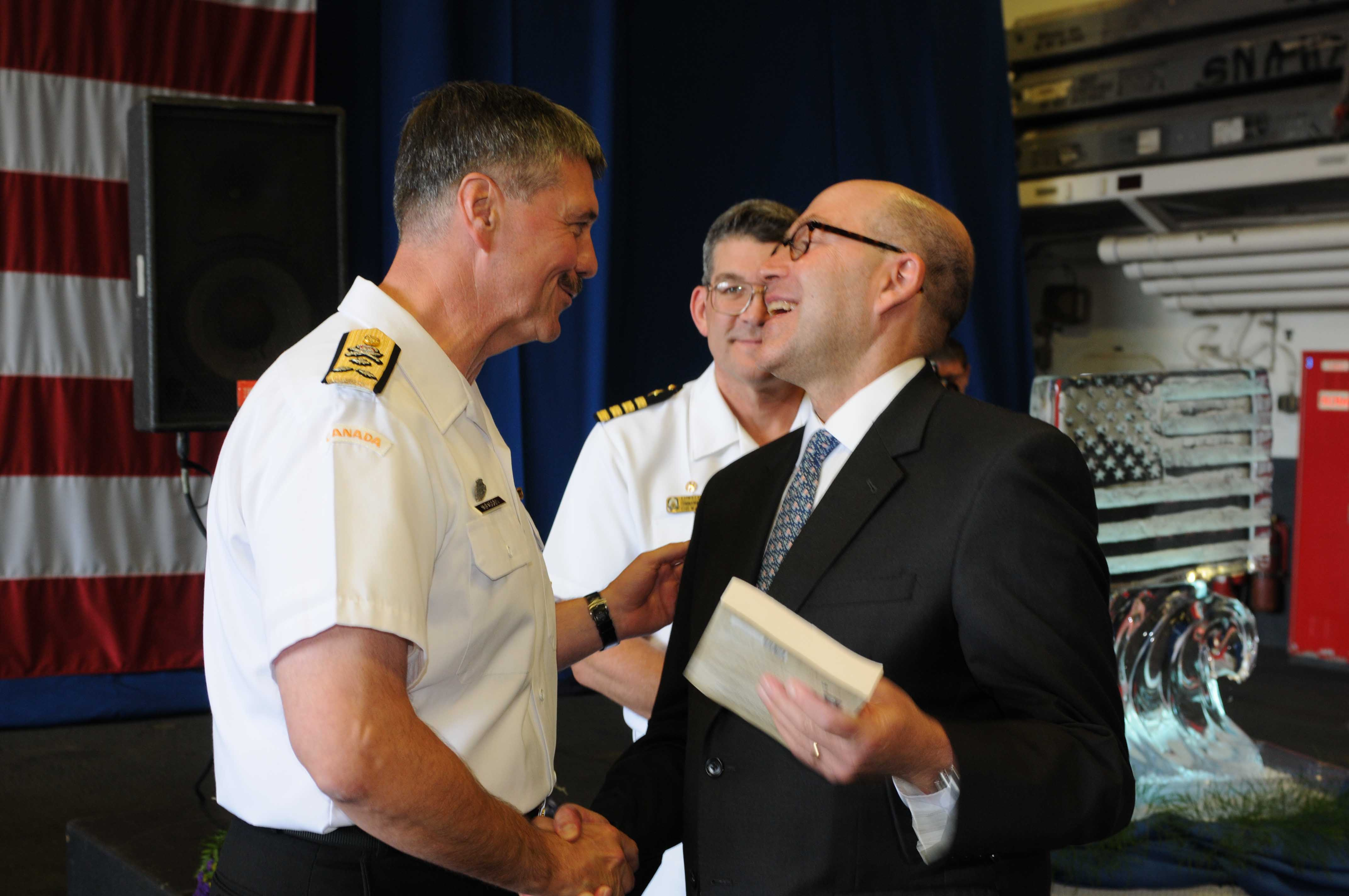
- VAdm Philip Dean McFadden, left
- Born: July 1957 (age 69); Belfast, Northern Ireland
- Military career
- Allegiance: Canada
- Branch: Canadian Forces
- Service years: 1974–2011
- Rank: Vice-Admiral
- Commands: Canada Command; Maritime Forces Atlantic
- Awards: Commander of the Order of Military Merit; Canadian Forces' Decoration

Vice-Admiral Philip Dean McFadden, CMM, CD (born July 12, 1957) is a retired officer of the Canadian Forces. He was chief of the Maritime Staff from 2009 to 2011 and last to hold the post before it was renamed to commander of the Royal Canadian Navy.

== Career ==
Born in Belfast, Northern Ireland, McFadden was educated at Belfast Royal Academy before his family immigrated to Vancouver, British Columbia in 1973.

He joined the Canadian Forces (CF) in 1974 as a cadet at Royal Roads Military College. He served aboard Her Majesty's Canadian Ships (HMCS) Yukon, Restigouche and Miramichi, as well as instructing navigation at the Naval Officers’ Training Centre Venture. In 1982 he released from the CF to work with the Canadian Coast Guard at Vessel Traffic Services in Vancouver.

In 1983 McFadden re-enrolled in the CF serving in HMCS Chaleur, Miramichi, Kootenay and Thunder. In 1987 he attended the year-long Combat Control Officers Course, followed in 1987 by an appointment to the destroyer-escort HMCS Qu’Appelle. In 1989 he was appointed to the staff of the NATO Commander-in-Chief Eastern Atlantic at Northwood, UK in support of the Standing Naval Force Atlantic. In 1990, on return to Canada, he served at the Canadian Forces Fleet School Halifax, followed by the staff of the Commander Fifth Canadian Destroyer Squadron, subsequently the Seventh Maritime Operations Group. In 1996 he attended the Canadian Forces College in Toronto, and later that year, on promotion to commander he returned to Halifax as executive officer of the replenishment ship HMCS Provider. In 1997 he assumed command of the frigate HMCS Montreal, and in 1999 he was appointed Commander Sea Training (Atlantic).

In 2000 he was promoted to captain(N) and assumed responsibilities as director of maritime strategy for the chief of the Maritime Staff at National Defence Headquarters (NDHQ) in Ottawa. Following a year-long language training, in 2002 he was appointed director of Asia-Pacific policy at NDHQ. In December 2003, upon completion of Advanced Military Studies at the Canadian Forces College, he returned to the East Coast and assumed command of the Fifth Maritime Operations Group. Promoted to commodore in 2005, he assumed command of the Atlantic Fleet. In 2006 he was promoted to rear admiral and assumed command of Maritime Forces Atlantic in August of that year.

He served as commander of Canada Command and as the commander of Maritime Forces Atlantic, as well as commander of Joint Task Force Atlantic. He became chief of the Maritime Staff in 2009 and on his retirement in 2011 was appointed a commander of the Order of Military Merit.

McFadden is married to Eva McFadden (née Edmonds) from Bedford, Nova Scotia and has two children.

Cutting the cake for Canada's Navy Centennial

== Awards and decorations ==
McFadden's personal awards and decorations include the following:

Ribbon	Description	Notes
	Order of Military Merit (CMM)	Appointed Commander (CMM) on 2 October 2007
	Special Service Medal	with NATO-OTAN Clasp
	Canadian Forces' Decoration (CD)	with two Clasp for 32 years of service
	Chief of Defence Staff Commendation	

Military offices
Preceded by Drew Robertson	Chief of the Maritime Staff; 2009–2011	Succeeded by Paul Maddison
