= Paul Maddison =

Canadian academic

Vice-Admiral Paul A. Maddison CMM, MSM, CD
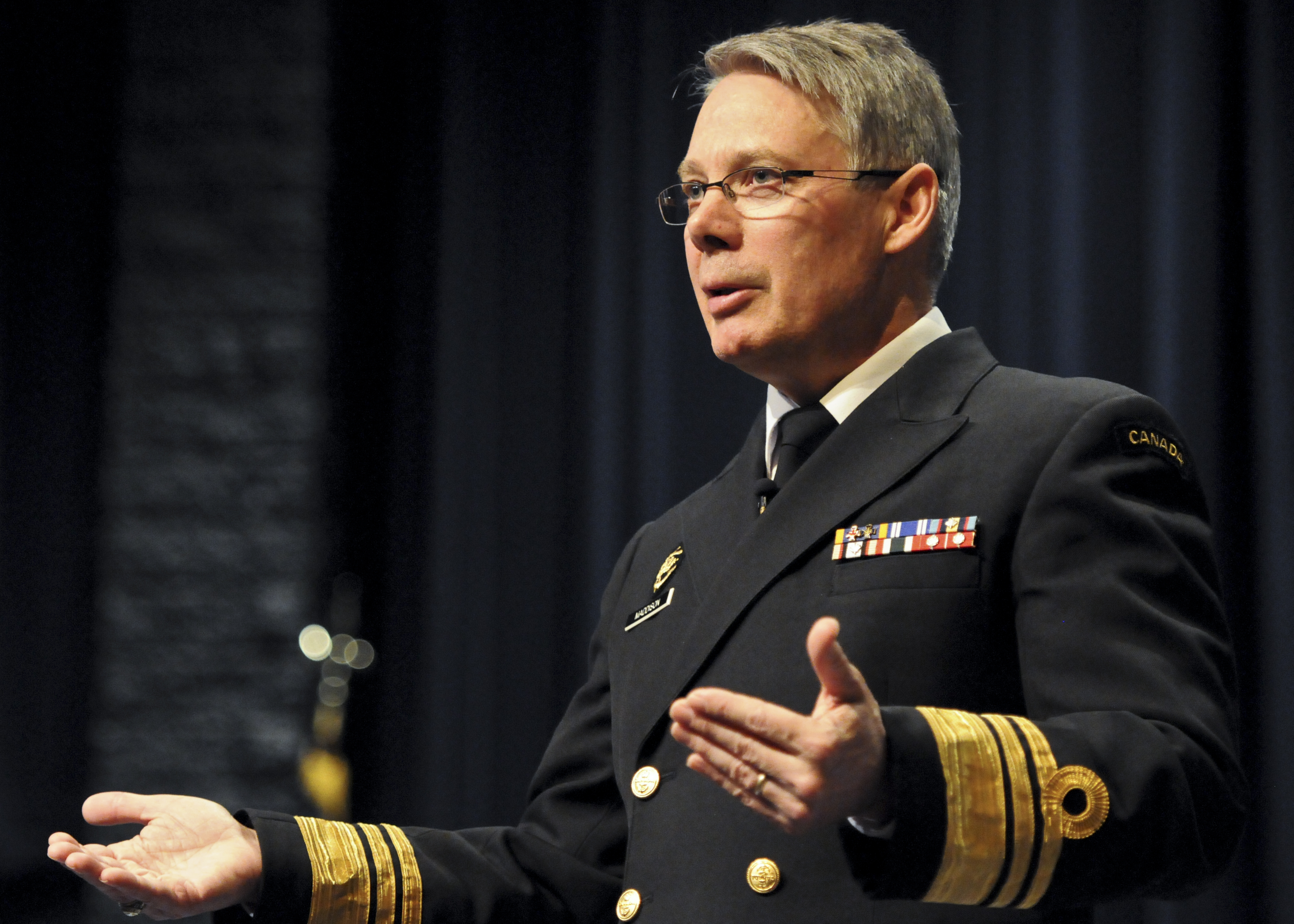
- Vice-Admiral Paul Andrew Maddison

Canadian High Commissioner to Australia
- In office August 2015 – May 2019
- Monarch: Elizabeth II
- Preceded by: Michael Small
- Succeeded by: Mark Glauser

Chief of the Naval Staff Commander of the Royal Canadian Navy
- In office 21 July 2011 – June 2013
- Preceded by: Dean McFadden
- Succeeded by: Mark Norman

Military service
- Allegiance: Canada
- Branch/service: Royal Canadian Navy (Note: Known as Canadian Forces Maritime Command until 2011)
- Years of service: 1975–2013
- Rank: Vice-Admiral
- Commands: Royal Canadian Navy; Maritime Forces Atlantic; HMCS Iroquois; HMCS Calgary
- Battles/wars: Gulf War; War in Afghanistan
- Awards: Commander of the Order of Military Merit; Meritorious Service Medal; Canadian Forces' Decoration; Commander of the Legion of Merit (United States)

Vice-Admiral Paul Andrew Maddison, CMM, MSM, CD is a Canadian academic, former diplomat and retired officer of the Royal Canadian Navy. He served as Commander of the Royal Canadian Navy from 22 July 2011 to 21 June 2013. He subsequently served as the High Commissioner of Canada to Australia from August 2015 until May 2019.

== Career ==
Maddison joined the Canadian Forces in 1975. In 1980, he graduated from Royal Military College Saint-Jean with a Bachelor of Arts. He served on various vessels and in appointments with both the Atlantic and Pacific fleets. In 1991, he deployed to the Persian Gulf with the Canadian Task Group.

From 1994 to 1996, Maddison served as Executive Officer of the frigate HMCS Winnipeg. This was followed by his first command, HMCS Calgary, from 1997 to 1999. From 1999 to 2002, he was posted to NORAD headquarters. From 2002 to 2004 he captained the destroyer HMCS Iroquois, a period which included a deployment to the Persian Gulf and Arabian Sea as part of Combined Task Force 151.

In 2005, Maddison's career shifted to National Defence Headquarters in Ottawa, where he became Director General of Maritime Force Development and then Commander of the Standing Contingency Task Force the following year. In 2007 he became Assistant Chief of Military Personnel. In May 2008, Maddison assumed command of the navy's Atlantic fleet, Maritime Forces Atlantic, as well as Joint Task Force Atlantic, the military organization responsible for domestic operations in Atlantic Canada.

In August 2010, Maddison became the Assistant Chief of the Maritime Staff under Vice-Admiral Dean McFadden. Upon McFadden's retirement from the Canadian Forces on July 21, 2011, Maddison became Commander of the Royal Canadian Navy before retiring in 2013.

In June 2015, Maddison was appointed as the High Commissioner of Canada to Australia. He relinquished the post in 2019, and was appointed the inaugural director of the University of New South Wales Defence Research Institute in Canberra, Australia.

== Awards and decorations ==
Maddison's personal awards and decorations include the following:

| Ribbon | Description | Notes |
| | Order of Military Merit (CMM) | Appointed Commander (CMM) on 27 October 2010; Appointed Officer (OMM) on 21 September 2006 |
| | Meritorious Service Medal (MSM) | Decoration awarded on 23 November 2007; Military division |
| | Gulf and Kuwait Medal | with Clasp 1991 |
| | South-West Asia Service Medal | with AFGHANISTAN Clasp |
| | Special Service Medal | with NATO-OTAN Clasp |
| | Queen Elizabeth II Diamond Jubilee Medal | Decoration awarded in 2012; Canadian version |
| | Canadian Forces' Decoration (CD) | with two Clasp for 32 years of services |
| | Commander of the Legion of Merit | Decoration awarded 26 April 2013; Commander level; United States award |
| | Legion of Honour | Decoration awarded 17 December 2013; Officer level; France award |

== Notes ==
Military offices
| Preceded by Dean McFadden | Commander of the Royal Canadian Navy; 2011–2013 | Succeeded by Mark Norman |
