= Australia–Canada bilateral treaties =

The following is a list of international bilateral treaties between Australia and Canada

- Early treaties were extended to Australia and Canada by the British Empire, however they are still generally in force.
- Excludes treaties associated with Commonwealth of Nations agreements.

Entry into force	Topic	Title	Ref
1906	Money orders	Convention between the Commonwealth of Australia and the Dominion of Canada for the Exchange of Money Orders	
1914	Post	Agreement for an Exchange of Postal Parcels between the Commonwealth of Australia and the Dominion of Canada	
1927	Post	Annex to the Agreement for an Exchange of Postal Parcels between Australia and Canada of 1 August-21 November 1913	
1931	Trade	Trade Agreement between Australia and Canada	
1944	Other	Agreement between the Governments of the Commonwealth of Australia and Canada on the Principles applying to the Provision by Canada of Canadian War Supplies to the Commonwealth of Australia under the War Appropriation (United Nations Mutual Aid) Act of Canada 1943	
1945	Other	Agreement between the Government of the Commonwealth of Australia and the Government of Canada with respect to the Loan to the Government of the Commonwealth of Australia of Vessels owned by the Government of Canada	
1946	Trade	Exchange of Notes between the Government of the Commonwealth of Australia and the Government of Canada amending for the Period 13 August-31 December 1946, the Trade Agreement of 8 July 1931, as regards Duty on Oranges Imported into Canada	
1951	Trade	Agreement between the Governments of Australia and Canada for Air Services between Australia and Canada	
1958	Taxation	Agreement between the Government of the Commonwealth of Australia and the Government of Canada for the Avoidance of Double Taxation and the Prevention of Fiscal Evasion with respect to Taxes on Income	
1959	Atomic energy	Agreement between the Government of the Commonwealth of Australia and the Government of Canada for Cooperation in the Peaceful Uses of Atomic Energy	
1960	Trade	Trade Agreement between the Government of the Commonwealth of Australia and the Government of Canada	
1966	Social security	Agreement between the Government of Australia and the Government of Canada concerning Application of the Canada Pension Plan to Locally Engaged Employees of the Government of Australia in Canada	
1969	Post	Agreement between the Government of the Commonwealth of Australia and the Government of Canada concerning Uninsured and Insured Parcels	
1973	Trade	Exchange of Letters constituting an Agreement between the Government of Australia and the Government of Canada concerning the Future Operation of the Trade Agreement of 12 February 1960	
1974	Trade	Exchange of Notes constituting an Agreement between the Government of Australia and the Government of Canada amending the Air Services Agreement of 11 June 1946 and cancelling Amending Agreement of 16 March 1951	
1976	Science	Exchange of Notes constituting an Agreement between the Government of Australia and the Government of Canada relating to the Launching of a Canadian Scientific Rocket from Woomera	
1981	Atomic energy	Agreement between the Government of Australia and the Government of Canada concerning the Peaceful Uses of Nuclear Energy	
1981	Taxation	Convention between Australia and Canada for the Avoidance of Double Taxation and the Prevention of Fiscal Evasion with respect to Taxes on Income	
1986	Consular	Exchange of Notes constituting an Agreement between the Government of Australia and the Government of Canada for Sharing Consular Services Abroad	
1988	Trade	Agreement between the Government of Australia and the Government of Canada relating to Air Services	
1989	Social security	Reciprocal Agreement on Social Security between the Government of Australia and the Government of Canada	
1990	Criminal law	Treaty between the Government of Australia and the Government of Canada on Mutual Assistance in Criminal Matters	
1990	Trade	Films Co-Production Agreement between the Government of Australia and the Government of Canada	
1992	Social security	Protocol amending the Reciprocal Agreement on Social Security between the Government of Australia and the Government of Canada of 4 July 1988	
1995	Atomic energy	Exchange of Notes Constituting an Agreement to Amend, and to Provide for International Obligation Exchanges Under, the Agreement Between the Government of Australia and the Government of Canada Concerning the Peaceful Uses of Nuclear Energy of 9 March 1981	
1996	Defence	Agreement between the Government of Australia and the Government of Canada concerning the Protection of Defence Related Information exchanged Between Them	
2002	Taxation	Protocol Amending the Convention Between Australia and Canada for the Avoidance of Double Taxation and the Prevention of Fiscal Evasion with respect to Taxes on Income (Canberra, 23 January 2002)	
2003	Social security	Agreement on Social Security Between the Government of Australia and the Government of Canada (Ottawa, 26 July 2001)	
2006	Trade	Mutual Recognition Agreement on Conformity Assessment In Relation To Medicines Good Manufacturing Practice Inspection and Certification Between the Government of Australia and the Government of Canada (Canberra, 16 March 2005)	
