= List of high commissioners of Canada to Australia =

High Commissioner for Canada in Australia
- Incumbent; Mark Glauser since August 28, 2019
- Residence: Canberra
- Nominator: Prime Minister of Canada
- Appointer: Governor General of Canada
- Term length: At His Majesty's pleasure
- Inaugural holder: Charles Jost Burchell
- Formation: November 2, 1939

The High Commissioner for Canada in Australia is the official representative of the Canadian government to the government of Australia. The current Canadian high commissioner is Mark Glauser who was appointed on the advice of Prime Minister Justin Trudeau on August 28, 2019.

The High Commission of Canada is located at Commonwealth Avenue, Canberra.

As fellow members of the Commonwealth of Nations, diplomatic relations between Canada and Australia are at governmental level, rather than between heads of state. Thus, the countries exchange high commissioners, rather than ambassadors.

== History of diplomatic relations ==
Diplomatic relations between Canada and Australia was established in 1939. Charles Jost Burchell was appointed as Canada's first high commissioner in Australia on November 2, 1939.

== List of heads of mission ==
No.	Name	Term of office			Career	Prime Minister nominated by	Ref.
No.	Name	Start date	PoC.	End date	Career	Prime Minister nominated by	Ref.
1	Charles Jost Burchell	November 2, 1939	December 27, 1939	July 24, 1941	Non-Career	W. L. Mackenzie King (1935–1948)	
—	Evan Benjamin Rogers (Acting High Commissioner)	July 24, 1941		January 7, 1942	Career	W. L. Mackenzie King (1935–1948)	
2	Victor Wentworth Odlum	November 6, 1941	January 7, 1942	September 20, 1942	Career	W. L. Mackenzie King (1935–1948)	
3	Thomas Clayton Davis	November 5, 1942	December 30, 1942	May 29, 1946	Non-Career	W. L. Mackenzie King (1935–1948)	
—	Carman Millward Croft (Acting High Commissioner)	May 29, 1946		May 27, 1947	Career	W. L. Mackenzie King (1935–1948)	
4	Kenneth Alfred Greene	April 15, 1947	May 27, 1947	1949	Non-Career	W. L. Mackenzie King (1935–1948)	
5	Léo Richer Laflèche	April 26, 1949	October 20, 1949	October 9, 1950	Non-Career	Louis St. Laurent (1948–1957)	
—	Carman Millward Croft (Acting High Commissioner)	October 9, 1950		June 9, 1951	Career	Louis St. Laurent (1948–1957)	
6	Colin Fraser Elliott	March 1, 1951	June 9, 1951	April 1953	Non-Career	Louis St. Laurent (1948–1957)	
7	William Arthur Irwin	March 19, 1953	August 8, 1953	September 1956	Non-Career	Louis St. Laurent (1948–1957)	
—	Donald Macalister Cornett (Acting High Commissioner)	September 1956		April 1957	Career	Louis St. Laurent (1948–1957)	
8	Terence MacDermot	January 17, 1957	April 26, 1957	August 1961	Career	Louis St. Laurent (1948–1957)	
9	Evan William Thistle Gill	February 15, 1962	July 22, 1962	January 28, 1965	Career	John G. Diefenbaker (1957–1963)	
10	Arthur Redpath Menzies	September 2, 1965	November 22, 1965	July 22, 1972	Career	Lester B. Pearson (1963–1968)	
11	James Joachim McCardle	April 4, 1972	October 19, 1972	June 28, 1977	Career	Pierre Elliott Trudeau (1968–1979 & 1980–1984)	
12	John Alan Beesley	June 30, 1977	1977	December 4, 1980	Career	Pierre Elliott Trudeau (1968–1979 & 1980–1984)	
13	Raymond Cecil Anderson	July 10, 1980	1980	August 1983	Career	Pierre Elliott Trudeau (1968–1979 & 1980–1984)	
14	Edward Richard Schreyer	May 14, 1984	1984	February 18, 1988	Non-Career	Pierre Elliott Trudeau (1968–1979 & 1980–1984)	
15	Robert Allen Kilpatrick	October 8, 1987	February 10, 1988	January 5, 1991	Career	Brian Mulroney (1984–1993)	
16	Leonard Michael Berry	September 19, 1991	1991	July 1995	Career	Brian Mulroney (1984–1993)	
17	Brian Schumacher	August 18, 1995	1995	July 1999	Career	Jean Chrétien (1993–2003)	
18	James Bartleman	June 10, 1999	November 9, 1999	July 1, 2000	Career	Jean Chrétien (1993–2003)	
19	Jean T. Fournier	July 26, 2000	August 31, 2000	July 2004	Career	Jean Chrétien (1993–2003)	
—	Gaston Barban (Acting High Commissioner)	July 2004		July 7, 2005	Career	Paul Martin (2003–2006)	
20	Michael Leir	August 19, 2005	November 1, 2005	August 4, 2010	Career	Paul Martin (2003–2006)	
—	John Mundy (Consul - General)	June 10, 2010			Career	Stephen Harper (2006–2015)	
21	Michael Small	August 10, 2010	September 19, 2010	December 13, 2014	Career	Stephen Harper (2006–2015)	
—	Charles Reeves (Acting High Commissioner)	December 14, 2014		August 24, 2015	Career	Stephen Harper (2006–2015)	
22	Paul Maddison	June 22, 2015	August 25, 2015	May 27, 2019	Non-Career	Stephen Harper (2006–2015)	
—	Isabelle Martin (Acting High Commissioner)	May 28, 2019		October 3, 2019	Career	Justin Trudeau (2015–2025)	
23	Mark Glauser	August 28, 2019	October 4, 2019		Career	Justin Trudeau (2015–2025)	
23	Julie Sunday	June 12, 2024			Career	Justin Trudeau (2015–2025)	
