= John Short Larke =

John Short Larke (May 28, 1840 – April 24, 1910) was Canada's first trade commissioner who represented the country in Australia starting in 1895.

== Biography ==
John Short Larke was born near Stratton, Cornwall, England, UK. At the age of four, he arrived in Oshawa, Canada West with his parents. Between 1865 and 1878, Larke bought out the owners of the Oshawa Vindicator, becoming the sole proprietor of a strongly pro-Conservative newspaper in Oshawa, Ontario.

In 1894, Larke became Canada's first trade commissioner following a successful trade delegation to Australia led by Canada's first Minister of Trade and Commerce, Mackenzie Bowell. Arriving in Sydney in 1895, Larke was tasked with developing the market for Canadian products in Australia, developing a list of Canadian suppliers for promoting sales to Australia, and reporting back to Ottawa regarding market conditions. During Larke’s years as a Trade Commissioner, the Canadian Trade Commissioner Service expanded from one man to twenty-one, representing Canada in sixteen countries. Today, the Trade Commissioner Service, part of the Foreign Affairs and International Trade Canada, operates over 150 offices in over 100 countries around the world.
