= Canada–Australia Consular Services Sharing Agreement =

1986 bilateral consular services agreement between Canada and Australia

The Canada–Australia Consular Services Sharing Agreement (French: Accord sur le partage de services consulaires entre le Canada et l'Australie) is a bilateral agreement between the governments of Australia and Canada for each country to provide consular assistance to citizens of the other in situations which are from time to time agreed between the two countries. Missions in areas where only one country has developed diplomatic relations will provide consular services to both Canadian and Australian passport holders or citizens.

This agreement has been in place since 7 August 1986 when the Right Honourable Joe Clark, P.C., M.P., Secretary of State for External Affairs of Canada and the Honourable Bill Hayden, M.P., Minister for Foreign Affairs of Australia exchanged notes to create the agreement. The agreement was renewed in 2001, with 14 Canadian posts (mostly in West African and the Latin American countries) and 13 Australian delegations (mainly in the South Pacific) where consular services are shared were specified.

== Background ==
Australia and Canada share many similarities in the countries' histories, composition of populations and culture. Both countries were formed from the union of British colonies and both have absorbed a large number of British immigrants in previous centuries. Apart from the similar history, both countries are also famous for their multiculturality and open attitude towards immigrants.

Canada and Australia have developed a close and deep relationship with each other and cooperate with each other in many different areas. Both countries are members of United Nations, Asia-Pacific Economic Cooperation (APEC), Cairns Group, Commonwealth of Nations, Five Eyes and the Organisation for Economic Co-operation and Development (OECD). Being members of many worldwide organisations shows the close friendship between the government of two countries, there are multiple channels and platforms for cooperation and communication between two countries. Among many of the agreements and deals signed by two countries, the consular service sharing is the most important cooperation between two countries.

== Canadian Foreign Policy ==
Canada has developed official relations with countries, which located in North America, South America, Europe, Asia, Africa, and Oceania. Among all other countries, the United States of America has the closest relations with Canada, two countries cooperate with each other in a wide aspect, ranging from the supply of essentials and military. What helps the flow of population between two countries is the longest border of USA and Canada which is the longest in the world, with citizens of each country can enter each other's country for short period without visa.

Australia is also a country with a close relationship with Canada. Canada developed formal relations with Australia on 12 September 1939, and the two countries have cooperated in different ways, especially in trading and mobility of populations.

== Australian Foreign policy ==
Australia has developed formal relations with many countries across North America, South America, Europe, Africa, Asia and Oceania. Due to its unique geographical location, Australia has developed a relatively close relationships with Asian countries, interactions between Australia and other Asian countries are also more frequent than with any European and countries in North and South America.

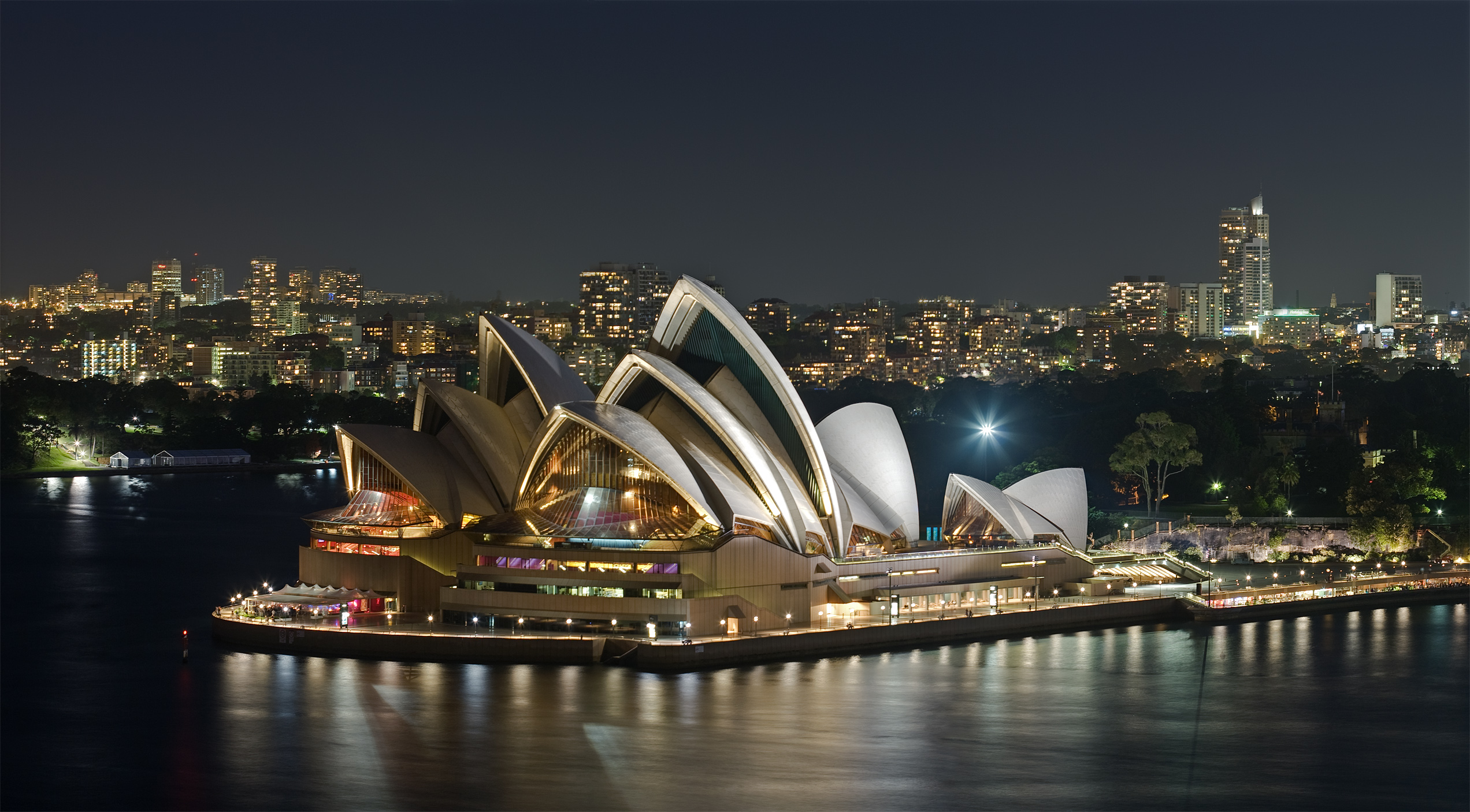
Sydney Opera House - Dec 2008

New Zealand is one of the closest countries to Australia geographically, which promotes the extremely close connections between two countries. To take advantage of the relationship between two countries, Australia cooperates with New Zealand in multiple ways, with Trans-Tasman migration and connections being the most significant. This agreement was signed in 1973 and allowed the free flow of citizens between two countries, increasing the population of New Zealanders in major cities of Australia including Sydney, Melbourne, and Brisbane.

== Consulate ==
The Vienna Convention on Consular Relations provides the broad, detailed and internationally accepted definition of consular functions, which have listed out specific functions that each consular must provide to their citizens in foreign countries.

This treaty consists of 79 articles, which lists out the functions of consuls and specific rules for the host countries to protect the right of consuls from foreign countries. For example, the host country does not have the right to enter the site of foreign embassies without the permission from the consuls, whilst the host countries have the responsibility to protect the consular premises from danger.

== Consular guides and instructions ==
The following information are provided based on details in the Canada-Australia Consular Service Sharing Agreement.

All consular services mentioned will be provided in accordance with country specific rules. For services provided by Canadian consuls, they need to follow the rules in the Manual of Consular Instructions; if services are provided by Australian consuls, all procedures must follow the rules according to the Australian Consular Instructions and the Manual of Australian Passport Issue.

The Australian Department of Foreign Affairs and Trade will provide certain consular services in English and French, since Canada has two official languages which are English and French, the Department of Foreign Affairs Canada will afford the cost of providing services in English and French by the Australian Department of Foreign Affairs and Trade. If the Australian mission are not able to provide services to a Canadian in French, officers of the Australian mission will assist the interaction of the Canadian with the Canadian supervising mission by phone or any electronic communications facilities.

For request involving the request of emergency travel documents, they will be directed to the corresponding missions. The responsible mission will issue their specific "Emergency Passports" to their citizens which will only in effect for limited time for the purpose of allowing them to return to their home countries.

When under specific crises, both departments recognise the value and importance of contingency planning and crisis management, and the opportunities presented by bilateral cooperation in this area, which means responsible missions must consider the value of both Canadian and Australian citizens in their emergency plans and the plan must be shared with their appropriate supervising mission.

Missions that will serve both Australian and Canadian citizens will notify their corresponding supervising missions. The responsible mission reports all requests from citizens that were not their responsible countries to their supervising missions, they need specific instructions and authorities from the supervising mission.

Communications between the responsible missions and supervising missions are variable. In most cases, consultations will be by phone and specific instructions and authorities will be in written form. If there are complaints about the services provided by the mission of the other country, responsible missions will refer the complaint to the home department of relevant missions for investigations.

The use or disclosure of personal information is strictly monitored by the privacy law in either Canada or Australia. Some of the requests by citizens of other countries may involve the use of personal information, the mission that possess the request or should be in accordance with Canada's Privacy Act or Australia's Privacy Act 1988.

Australia and Canada Federal government will consult in frequent period to consider whether any changes in the Memorandum of Understanding needed or not, all the operation of the Memorandum of Understanding will be reviewed annual to coincide with the Five Nations Consular Colloque, the review will be reschedules if there is no Colloque schedules.

The Memorandum of Understanding was updated in 2001, which replaced the Memorandum of Understanding on Sharing Consular Services between the Department of External Affairs of Canada and the Department of Foreign Affairs of Australia signed on 22 January 1987. The Memorandum of Understanding can be terminated by giving notice from either the Department External Affairs of Canada or the Department of Foreign Affairs of Australia, the Memorandum of Understanding will be invalid 6 months after receipt of that notice. However, termination of the updated Memorandum of Understanding will not affect the continuation in force of the original agreement of 7 August 1986.

== Consular services included and not included in the agreement ==
Services that will be provided for other nations:

- Intervention in cases of arrest or detention
- Intervention to assist victims of crime or accidents in foreign countries
- Assistance on international child abduction/custody cases
- Relieve, financial assistance and repatriation which will be provided on the recoverable basis
- Assistance in cases of illness and hospitalisation, such as arrangements for payment of medical and hospital services which will also be provided in recoverable basis
- Issue of emergency travel documents to Australians and Canadians
- Assistance with arrangements regarding deaths of citizens, including local burial or transportation of the remains
- Assistance related to lost or stolen property enquiries, local enquiries regarding the whereabouts of nationals of the other country
- Assistance relating to crisis management
- Local registration of nationals of the other country
- Passing requests for information and services which are not included in the agreement to the supervising missions

Services that will not be shared

- Issuance of regular passports or visas
- Legal or notarial acts
- Assistance in extradition cases
- Administration of the estates of citizens
- Registration of deaths
- Invigilation of examinations
- Provision of specific information on any matter

== Australian Missions ==
Canadians can seek consular assistance from the following Australian diplomatic missions, they are all supervised by nearby Canadian missions:

- Federated States of Micronesia
  - Pohnpei (Embassy)
  - Covers Guam, Marianas Islands, Marshall Islands, and Palau.
  - Supervised by mission in Canberra
- France (New Caledonia)
  - Nouméa (Consulate-General)
  - Covers French Polynesia and Wallis & Futuna
  - Supervised by mission in Wellington and Canberra
- Indonesia
  - Denpasar, Bali (Consulate-General)
  - Supervised by mission in Jakarta
- Kiribati
  - Tarawa (High Commission)
  - Supervised by mission in Wellington
- Nauru
  - Aiwo (High Commission)
  - Supervised by mission in Canberra
- Papua New Guinea
  - Port Moresby (High Commission)
  - Supervised by mission in Canberra
- Samoa
  - Apia (High Commission)
  - Covers American Samoa
  - Supervised by mission in Wellington
- Solomon Islands
  - Honiara (High Commission)
  - Supervised by mission in Canberra
- Thailand
  - Phuket (Consulate-General)
  - Supervised by mission in Bangkok
- Timor-Leste
  - Dili (Embassy)
  - Supervised by mission in Jakarta
- Tonga
  - Nukuʻalofa (High Commission)
  - Supervised by mission in Wellington
- United States (Hawaii)
  - Honolulu (Consulate-General)
  - Supervised by mission in San Francisco
- Vanuatu
  - Port Vila (High Commission)
  - Supervised by mission in Canberra

== Canadian missions ==
Australians can seek consular assistance from the following Canadian diplomatic missions, they are all supervised by Australian missions or embassies in nearby area:

- Algeria
  - Algiers (Embassy)
  - Supervised by Australian embassy in Paris
- Burkina Faso
  - Ouagadougou (Embassy)
  - Supervised by missions in Accra
- Cameroon
  - Yaoundé (High Commission)
  - Covers Gabon
  - Supervised by missions in Abuja
- Côte d'Ivoire
  - Abidjan (Embassy)
  - Supervised by mission in Accra
- Cuba
  - Havana (Embassy)
  - Supervised by missions in Mexico City
- Democratic Republic of the Congo
  - Kinshasa (Embassy)
  - Supervised by mission in Harare
- Dominican Republic
  - Santo Domingo (Embassy)
  - Supervised by mission in Mexico City
- Ecuador
  - Quito (Embassy)
  - Supervised by mission in Santiago de Chile
- Gabon
  - Yaoundé (Canadian High Commission in Cameroon provides consular assistance to Australian citizens in Gabon)
  - Supervised by mission in Abuja
- The Gambia
  - Dakar (Canadian Embassy in Senegal provides consular assistance to Australian citizens in The Gambia)
  - Supervised by mission in Abuja
- Guinea
  - Dakar (Canadian Embassy in Senegal provides consular assistance to Australian citizens in Guinea)
  - Supervised by mission in Accra
- Hungary
  - Budapest (Embassy)
  - Supervised by mission in Vienna
- Iceland
  - Reykjavík (Embassy)
  - Supervised by mission in Copenhagen
- Kazakhstan
  - Astana (Embassy)
- Mali
  - Bamako (Embassy)
  - Supervised by mission in Accra
- Morocco
  - Rabat (Embassy)
- Senegal
  - Dakar (Embassy)
  - Covers Guinea and The Gambia.
- Tunisia
  - Tunis (Embassy)
- Venezuela
  - Caracas (Embassy)

== See also ==
- Australia–Canada relations
