= High Commission of Canada, Canberra =

Diplomatic mission of Canada to Australia

High Commission of Canada in Australia Haut-commissariat du Canada en Australie (French)
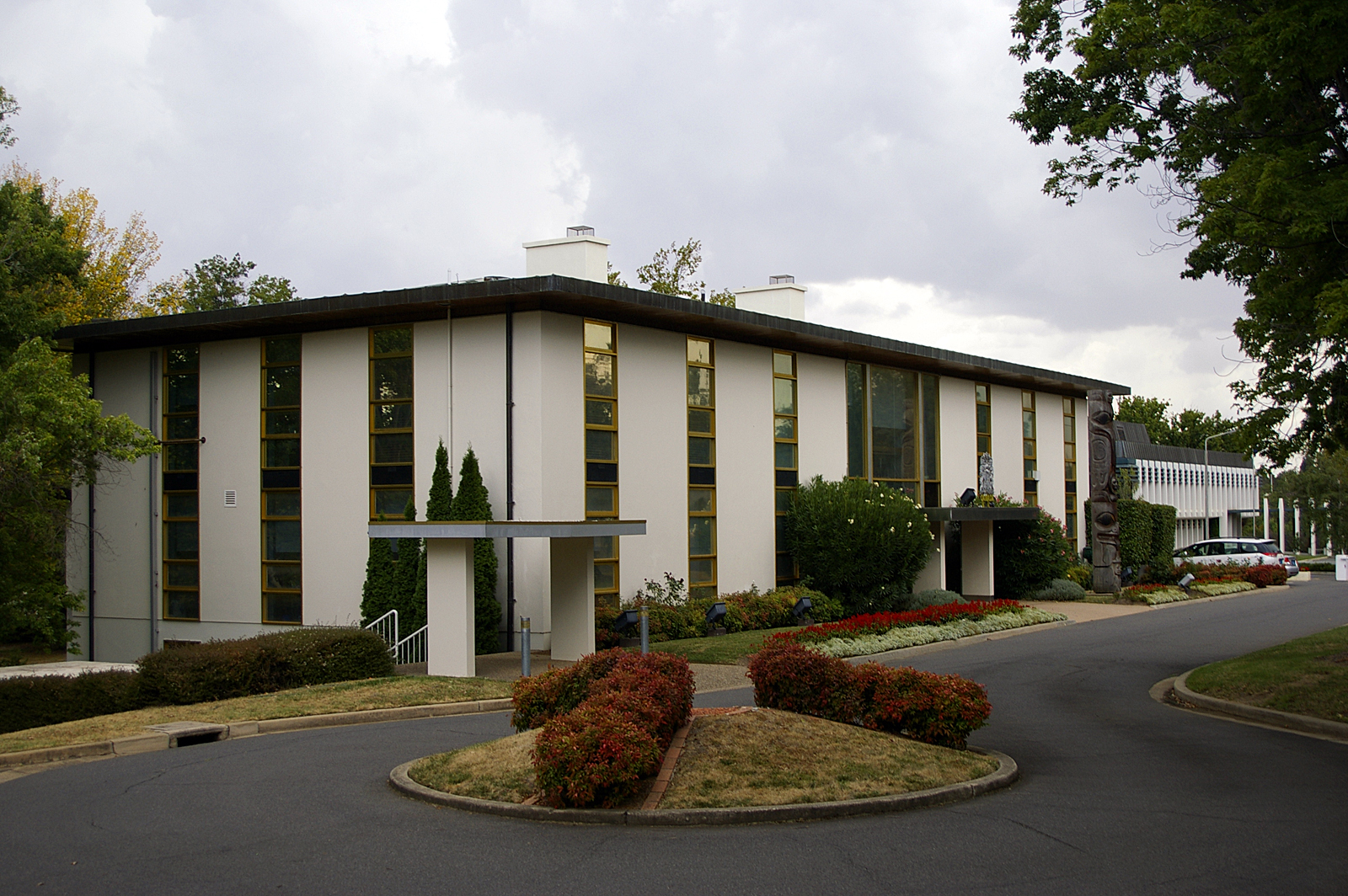
- Location: Canberra
- Address: Commonwealth Avenue
- Coordinates: 35.303°S 149.125°E
- High Commissioner: Julie Sunday

The High Commission of Canada in Australia is the diplomatic mission of Canada to Australia. It is located on Commonwealth Avenue, near State Circle, in the Australian capital city of Canberra. In addition to responsibility for bilateral relations between Canada and Australia, it is also responsible for relations with several Pacific Island nations, including the Marshall Islands, the Federated States of Micronesia, Nauru, Palau, Papua New Guinea, the Solomon Islands and Vanuatu.

== History ==
Diplomatic relations between Canada and Australia were formally established in 1939, just as World War II broke out, with the appointment of high commissioners between the two nations. The three-storey chancery was officially opened 30 January 1964 by the Prime Minister of Australia, the Right Honourable Sir Robert Menzies. In 1994, the chancery was expanded to include a two-storey wing at the rear of the building. The new extension was opened by the Honourable Raymond Chan, Secretary of State (Asia-Pacific), on 4 August 1994. The High Commission currently has currently about 60 personnel, including Canada-based staff and locally engaged employees.

Since 1950 the High Commissioner's Official Residence has been an elegant mansion on Mugga Way in Canberra's historic Red Hill Conservation Area. The current High Commissioner is Julie Sunday who was appointed on August 2024.

The primary services offered at the High Commission in Canberra relate to helping companies do business with Canada, helping Canadian companies do business with Australia, furthering defence relations, and providing assistance to Canadians in the following Australian states: Victoria, Tasmania, South Australia, Western Australia and the Australian Capital Territory. It also provides development cooperation services for the Pacific Islands.

Canada also maintains a Consulate General in Sydney (NSW) currently headed by Sarah Quigley. It is chiefly concerned with providing visa, immigration, and consular services for Canadians in the following states: New South Wales, Queensland and the Northern Territory. The mission has a much greater focus on cultural events given Sydney's national prominence in that sector. Canada also has Honorary Consuls in Perth and Melbourne.

== Overview ==
Australia and Canada have a longstanding relationship fostered by both countries' shared history and culture as well as the links between residents of the countries. The two countries are former British Dominions and have a common head of state in King Charles III (legally, the King is equally and separately the sovereign of both countries, as King of Australia and King of Canada). Both countries share the Westminster parliamentary system of government; and both countries are members of the Asia-Pacific Economic Cooperation, Cairns Group, Commonwealth of Nations, Comprehensive and Progressive Agreement for Trans-Pacific Partnership, Five Eyes, OECD and the United Nations.

== See also ==
- Canadian-Australian relations
- Canada-New Zealand relations
- High Commission of Australia in Ottawa
