= Canadian New Zealanders =

Total population
- 5,871 (2013 census)

Regions with significant populations
- Canadian people by region
- Auckland: 1,956
- Wellington: 864
- Canterbury: 747

Languages
- New Zealand English • Canadian English • Canadian French

Religion
- Protestantism · Roman Catholicism

Related ethnic groups
- Canadian diaspora, New Zealand Canadians

Canadian New Zealanders are New Zealand citizens who are of Canadian descent including immigrants or Canadian-born citizens and residents. Canadian New Zealanders constitute a small minority of New Zealand's population.

During the 19th century, many Canadians from Nova Scotia, New Brunswick and Prince Edward Island settled in New Zealand. The largest group settlement was at Waipu, where Scottish-born Reverend Norman McLeod settled his congregation of Scottish and Nova Scotian emigrants during the 1850s.

Other Canadian settlements included Helensville, founded by John McLeod and named for his wife. And Brunswick, founded by Tamberlane Campbell and named for his home province of New Brunswick.

== Notable Canadian New Zealanders ==
- William Douglas Hall Baillie, 2nd Superintendent of Marlborough Province
- James Cameron, filmmaker
- Brent Charleton, basketball player
- Joanne "Joe" Cotton, singer
- Daniel Gillies, actor
- Sarah Murphy, biathlete
- Tami Neilson, country & soul singer/songwriter
- Aaron Olson, basketball player
- Anna Paquin, actress
- Lynette Sadleir, synchronized swimmer
- Richard Tapper, freestyle swimmer
- Robert Poulin, parasitologist

== See also ==
- Caldoche
- Canada–New Zealand relations
- Canadian Australians
- European New Zealanders
- Europeans in Oceania
- French New Zealanders
- Immigration to New Zealand
- New Zealand Canadians
- Pākehā
