= Oceanian Canadians =

Canadians of Oceanian origin

Regions with significant populations
- Southern Ontario, Southwestern BC, Central Alberta, Montreal

Languages
- Canadian English · Canadian French · Fijian · Hawaiian · Māori · Samoan · Tongan

Religion
- Christianity · Irreligion

Oceanian Canadians are Canadians who were either born in or can trace their ancestry to Oceania. Oceanian Canadians can be further divided by ethnicity and/or nationality, such as Australian Canadian, New Zealand Canadians, and others, as seen on demi-decadal census data.

== See also ==
- Australian Canadians
- New Zealand Canadians
