= Bracchi =

Bracchi is an Italian surname. Notable people with the surname include:

- Alfredo Bracchi (1897–1976), Italian author
- Paolo Bracchi (died 1497), Italian Roman Catholic bishop

== See also ==
- Bacchi
