= Chris Beasley =

Chris Beasley may refer to:

- Chris Beasley (researcher), Australian academic
- Chris Beasley (baseball) (born 1962), former Major League Baseball player
- Chris Beasley (rugby league) (born 1983), player in Super League for the Celtic Crusaders
- Chris Beasley, actor in Isidingo
