= Bacchi =

Bacchi is an Italian surname. Notable people with the surname include:

- Adenor Leonardo Bacchi (born 1961), Brazilian footballer and manager
- Carol Bacchi (born 1948), Canadian-Australian political scientist
- Danilo Bacchi (born 1983), Italian footballer
- Karina Bacchi (born 1976), Brazilian actress, model and television personality
