= Adelaide Law Review =

- Discipline: Law
- Language: English

Publication details
- History: 1960 to present
- Publisher: University of Adelaide Press (Australia)
- Frequency: Biannual

Standard abbreviations
- Bluebook: Adel. L. Rev.
- ISO 4: Adel. Law Rev.

Indexing
- ISSN: 0065-1915

Links
- Journal homepage

The Adelaide Law Review is a scholarly refereed law journal based at the University of Adelaide.

It is published twice a year by the Adelaide Law Review Association of the University of Adelaide's Faculty of Law. The journal is managed by an editorial committee consisting of staff and students who are invited to take part in the editing process because of their strong academic record.

It is subscribed to by 278 of the libraries covered by WorldCat.
