= Chris Beasley (researcher) =

Australian researcher

Chris (Christine) Beasley is an Australian political scientist and gender studies academic. Her focuses of study include assumptions in sexuality and intimacy in the context of research on online dating, implications of and political uses of care, and the cultural politics of film.

== Education and academia ==
Beasley has a BA, Dip Ed, M Ed, and PhD from Flinders University, South Australia, and a MA from Birmingham University, UK. She is emerita professor in the Department of Politics and International Relations, University of Adelaide and an elected Fellow of the Australian Academy of Social Sciences. Beasley was the founder of the Fay Gale Centre for Research on Gender and its inaugural co-director from 2009 to 2013.

== Study ==
Beasley's work includes study of "potential disjunctions" that arise as a result of the different "theoretical frameworks or paradigms" that shape the overall agendas of masculinity studies and feminist scholarship.

Beasley has warned of the ethical limits of care as the basis of a resistant politics, highlighting what she describes as a "moral and asymmetrical relationship [that] is constructed between those needing care and those delivering care, undermining the egalitarian potential of the terminology."

Beasley has collaborated with Carol Bacchi, and together they have postulated the notion of "social flesh" as a means to challenge the use of individualism to study the human subject in political philosophy.

Beasley has published research on the cultural politics of film, including a 2019 book with co-author Heather Brook. In a review of the book, Rob Manwaring described it as helping to "understand film as 'political objects'" and consider how they reinforce power structures.

Beasley worked on two collaborations with Professor Mary Holmes on online dating. Their 2021 book, Internet Dating Intimacy and Social Change considers the topic from a socio-political perspective. Their co-authored chapter, "Older internet dating: ageist prescriptions and novel resexualising" in Resexualising Later Life Performances of Older Sexual Citizenship, published in September 2025 by Bristol Uni Press, "questions whether heterosexual internet dating… offers opportunities for enhancing social equality." Their work also challenges established writing on internet dating which typically focuses on young daters, and aims to "[reproduce] systemic prejudice against older people that discounts their complexity as human beings, as irreducibly social subjects, as relational and interconnected bodies, and as socio-political agents".

Beasley's other work includes a series of collaborations with Pam Papadelos on social justice, including a 2023 edited collection Living Legacies of Social Injustice: Power, Time and Social Change, published by Routledge in 2024.

== Selected publications ==
- C. Beasley and P. Papadelos (eds.), Living Legacies of Social Injustice: Power, Time and Social Change, Routledge, New York, 2024
- C. Beasley and M. Holmes, Internet Dating: Intimacy and Social Change, Routledge, New York, 2021
- C. Beasley and H. Brook, The Cultural Politics of Hollywood Film: Power, Culture and Society, Manchester University Press, 2019
- R. Harding, R. Fletcher and C. Beasley eds, Revaluing Care in Theory, Law & Policy: Cycles and Connections, Routledge, Oxfordshire, UK, 2017
- C. Beasley et al., Heterosexuality in Theory and Practice, Routledge Advances in Feminist Studies and Intersectionality Series, London & NY, 2012
- A. Bletsas and C. Beasley (eds.), Engaging with Carol Bacchi: Strategic Interventions and Exchanges, University of Adelaide Press, 2012
- C. Beasley, Gender & Sexuality: Critical Theories, Critical Thinkers, Sage, London & Thousand Oaks, Ca., 2005
- C. Beasley, What is Feminism?: An Introduction to Feminist Theory, Sage, London & Thousand Oaks, Ca., 1999 (also published as What is Feminism, anyway?: Understanding Contemporary Feminist Thought, Allen & Unwin, Sydney, 1999
- C. Beasley, Sexual Economyths: Conceiving a Feminist Economics, Allen and Unwin, Sydney, 1994)
