= Adelaide Law School =

Law school in Adelaide, Australia

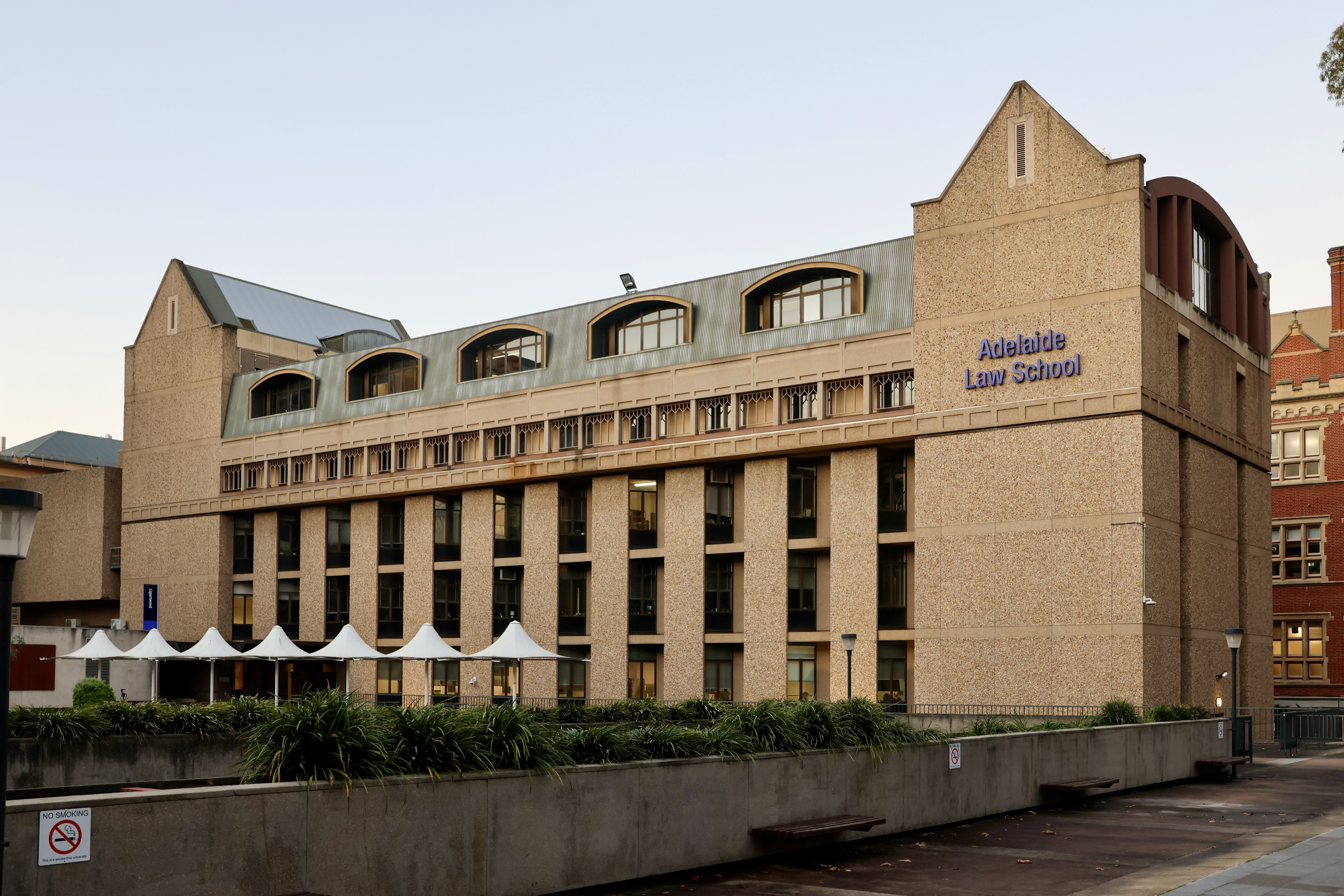
- The building in 2026
- Parent school: Adelaide University
- Established: 1883
- School type: Public
- Dean: Judith McNamara
- Location: Adelaide, South Australia, Australia
- Website: Official website

Adelaide Law School is a law school in Adelaide, Australia and is part of the University of Adelaide. It is the second oldest law school in Australia having been founded in 1883 and offers undergraduate and postgraduate qualifications.

There have been many notable alumni including: jurist John Finnis, International Court of Justice's judge James Crawford, former Minister of Foreign Affairs Julie Bishop, former Minister for Defence Industry Christopher Pyne, Minister for Foreign Affairs and Leader of the Government in the Senate Penny Wong, former Premier of South Australia Jay Weatherill, and the first female Prime Minister of Australia, Julia Gillard. Presently, the dean of the law school is Judith McNamara.

== Rankings ==
The QS World University Rankings by Subject 2014 – Law ranked the Adelaide Law School 46th in the world and 6th in Australia. The Commonwealth Government Excellence for Research in Australia (ERA) 2012 assessment exercise conferred the prestigious 4 rank (above world average upon the Adelaide Law School for the outstanding international quality of the research produced by faculty members.

== Adelaide University Law Students' Society ==
The Adelaide University Law Students' Society, or "the LSS", is an incorporated association of which all students enrolled at the Adelaide Law School are automatically members. It was founded in 1898 and is the second oldest organisation for law students in Australia. The LSS is operated by students of the Adelaide Law School and its purpose is to improve student life at the school. Its primary activities are to organise social events, such as the annual Law Ball, to organise competitions, such as mooting and trial advocacy, and to represent the student body on law school boards and committees. It also conducts a myriad of other activities aimed at assisting students and improving their time at the school. The LSS is also responsible for supporting the Adelaide Law School Revue.

== Adelaide Law Review ==
The Adelaide Law Review Association publishes the biannual law journal, the Adelaide Law Review.

== See also ==
- University of Adelaide
