= Canadian Australians =

Canadiens australien (French)

Total population
- Canadian; 38,871 (by birth, 2011); 33,218 (by ancestry, 2011)

Regions with significant populations
- Sydney · Melbourne · Brisbane

Languages
- Australian English · Canadian English · Canadian French

Religion
- Roman Catholicism · Protestantism · Judaism

Related ethnic groups
- American Australians

Canadian Australians (French: Canadiens australien) refers to Australians who identify as being of Canadian descent. It may also refer to Canadian immigrants and expatriates residing in Australia.

According to statistics from 2006, there were as many as 21,000 Australians who have Canadian ancestors. Many Canadian Australians have emigrated from mainland Canada, as well as from the United States and the United Kingdom. According to the 2016 Australian census, there were 43,049 Canadian-born Australians in Australia in 2016, which is an increase from 38,871 persons according to the 2011 Australian census. High immigration levels between the two countries stem from their shared status as former British colonies and their similar political systems based on parliamentary democracy in the Westminster tradition.

People born in Canada as a percentage of the population in Sydney by postal area.

== History ==
Early Canadians to settle in Australia include Edward Abbott and William Redfern. The first large group to arrive were from both upper (now Ontario) and lower (now Quebec) mainland Canada and were sent to New South Wales and Tasmania as punishment for their involvement in the 1837-38 Canadian civil war. There were 154 of these prisoners, 58 of whom were French Canadians and arrived New South Wales unable to speak English. All were initially assigned as laborers and eventually allowed to be free settlers. These workers helped to build Sydney's infrastructure some of which is still in use today, including Parramatta Road, Canada Bay, Exile Bay and a monument in Cabarita Park in Concord.

The second wave of Canadian Australians came in 1851 in search of gold. The Australian Gold Rush saw people from around the world flock to Australia in search of gold, which included hundreds of Canadians. They made an impact in the popular town of Ballarat, where the 'Canadian Gully' was the name given to a gully after a Canadian gold miner found success and a large gold nugget was also named 'The Canadian'.

Canadian Australians helped to develop the foundations of modern-day Australian society in the years during and after the gold rush. In 1854, Samuel McGowan established Australia's first telegraph line which stretched from Melbourne to Williamstown. Around the same time, George and William Chaffey made multiple irrigation schemes throughout the Murray River. This allowed for water to be transported further away than before, which led to greater farming success and eventually the beginning of the dried fruit industry in South Australia and Victoria.

=== Australian-Canadian similar experiences during World War I ===
On 4 August 1914, Great Britain declared war on Germany. Both Canada's and Australia's prime ministers accepted that their armies would join the imperial armies because Canada and Australia were British dominions at the time. Canada's opposition leader, Wilfrid Laurier said that Canada was "Ready, aye, Ready" to participate in the war effort. Australia's then opposition leader and later prime minister, Andrew Fisher, similarly commented that Australia was committed "to the last man and the last shilling."

There were many similarities between Australians and Canadians during World War I. The Australian 1st Division was initially commanded by Canadian-educated Major General Sir William Throsby Bridges. In 1915, the Canadian army was grouped in divisions which followed the precedent of the ANZAC (Australian and New Zealand Army Corps). Canadian and Australian soldiers fought side by side on the Western Front. Australians and Canadians fought together again in Passchendaele in late 1917 and launched the final allied offensives of 1918 in the east of Amiens which involved a spearhead of Australian soldiers and another of Canadian soldiers.

The Canadian and Australian governments called for an Imperial War Cabinet in 1918, where the two prime ministers both represented their wounded and dead soldiers. Because Canada and Australia together played an important role in the war, they had gained global influence, which was recognized by the British government. This led to the two prime ministers both representing separate dominions at the Paris Peace Conference in 1919 and 1920. While there were no constitutional changes during World War I, the Imperial War Cabinet lead to a change of attitude that led to the granting of de jure independence for both countries in the Statute of Westminster in 1931. This heightened sense of national identity that emerged in both Canada and Australia led to a third wave of Canadian immigrants into Australia. To show how paralleled Australia and Canada's World War I experiences were, the following statistics are given as a global rank and are according to NationMaster.com.

In terms of allied mobilized personnel in World War I, Canada is 10th with 628,934 people, and Australia is 11th with 412,953 people. Furthermore, in terms of Allied wounded in action during World War I, Australia ranked 6th with 152,171 casualties, while Canada ranked 7th with 149,732. In terms of deaths as a percentage of the total population, Australia ranked 11th at 1.38%, and Canada 12th at 0.92%.

=== Canadian-Australian programs and clubs ===
After the Second World War, the 'skilled migration program' developed by the Australian government allowed more Canadian immigrants to come to Australia if they had tertiary qualifications. This increased the number of Canadian Australians who immigrated to Australia and was also responsible for a general increase in immigration to Australia, most prominently from Europe and North America.

=== Network Canada ===
Network Canada is a professional and social networking group based in Sydney, which is also known as the Canadian Australian Network of Young Professionals. It is the largest network of North American young professionals living in Australia. They provide travel advice around Australia and advice for living in Australia. Network Canada was started in 2002 as a social network for Canadian expatriates living in Sydney. Network Canada includes students and professionals from all continents, and their hosted parties are sponsored by companies such as Canadian Club, Destination Canada, and Hungry Jack's. The objective of Network Canada is for people to meet and network. In addition to events, Network Canada helps Canadian Australians settle into Sydney life by providing advice for different types of visas, immigration questions, and general tips for a new Canadian Australian looking to live in Sydney.

=== Victoria ===
The Canada Club of Victoria (CCV) has been running since its origins in 1940 and involves Canadian Australians from Melbourne and Regional Victoria. The Canadian Women's Club of Victoria was established in 1940 to help Canadian women in Melbourne who were struggling with missing Canada, as well as struggling with their husbands being away at war. Around this time, the Canadian Men's Club was formed with a business and network-focused objective between Australia and Canada. In 1981, these two clubs joined together to create the present-day Canada Club of Victoria.

The CCV is a volunteer-run social club for Canadian Australians or individuals with strong family ties to Canada. Their objective is to integrate Canadian and Australian culture through running events. The CCV hosts two main events each year, which are Canada Day on the first of July and Thanksgiving on November 26. They also run several smaller social events for people to network and talk about Canada-related topics.

== Cultural events ==
Today, Canadian Australians still celebrate Canadian cultural events such as Canada Day (July 1) and Canadian Thanksgiving (the second Monday of October). Organizations such as the Canada Club help these traditional events to live on.

== Demographics ==
=== Religion ===
According to the 2016 Australian census and compared to the 2011 Australian Census, Canadian Australians who were born in Canada have had a decline in religious affiliation. In 2011, 36.7% fit within the census category of "No Religion", whereas in 2016, 45.3% identified as having "No Religion". The most common religion was Catholic in both 2011 and 2016, with 20% and 17.1% of Canadian-born Australians identifying as Catholic in those years, respectively. These changes in religious demographics follow a similar trend with all Australian-born Australians and non-Australian-born Australians respectively (24.5% & 20.2% non-religious in 2011 compared to 33.3% & 26.7% in 2016).

=== Education ===
In 2016, 20.6% of Canadian-born Australians aged 15 or over had a bachelor's degree or above as their highest educational achievement, compared to 22% of Australian-born Australians. Following a similar trend, 14.2% of Canadian-born Australians had completed year 12 as their highest educational achievement compared to 15.7% of Australian-born Australians. The decreased educational achievement is only slight but is consistent throughout other educational matrices. Canadian-born Australians had the following percentages as their highest education level: 8.8% had completed up to year 10, and 8.4% had completed up to year 9 or below. This can be compared to Australian-born Australians, where 10.8% had completed up to year 10 and 8% had completed up to year 9 or below as their highest education level.

The education levels of Canadian Australian families, as seen by the figures above, are quite similar. This may be because both Canada and Australia use standardized tests throughout primary and secondary school, and similar tests are used for university admission. However, Canadian-born Australians have a slightly decreased level of education, and it was found in Canada that "in schools with a high number of students who are visible minorities and English language learners, the effects of standardized testing include a range of practices that reinforce inequity and increase social disparity". Although this may also be apparent in some Australian schools, this could explain the slightly lower education levels of Canadian-born Australians.

=== Economics ===
In 2016, the median weekly income for Canadian-born Australians was $645 (personal), $1,570 (family), and $1,290 (household). This is slightly less than the figures for Australian-born Australians, who had a median weekly income of $662 (personal), $1,734 (family), and $1,438 (household). This trend can potentially be explained by the lack of opportunity for post-education training that workers in Canada are given by their employers. "Canada is categorized by the OECD as one of the 'weak' countries for training, and since it tends to be categorized as average or above for public support, this suggests that employer support is exceedingly weak by international standards. This has led to comments that Canadian employers lack a training culture" (Benjamin, 2001).

== Notable Canadian-Australians ==
- Rochelle Adonis, chef
- Jack Cowin, fast food magnate
- Rhiannon Fish, actress
- Luke Ford, actor
- Malcolm Fraser, 22nd Prime Minister of Australia
- Derek Muller, science communicator
- Pamela Rabe, actress
- Henry Ross, gold miner and rebel at the Eureka Rebellion
- Andrew McGrath, AFL Essendon - midfielder
- Jaeman Salmon, Rugby League Player
- Matt Dunning, Rugby Union Player
- Casey Dunning, Rugby Union Player
- Wendy Matthews, singer-songwriter

== See also ==
- Anglo-Celtic Australians
- Asian Australians
- Australian Canadians
- Australia–Canada relations
- Caldoche
- Canadian New Zealanders
- European Australians
- Europeans in Oceania
- French Australians
- Culture of Canada
- Immigration to Australia

== Bibliography ==
- Berry, Albert (2001). "Minimum Wages in Canada". Labor Market Policies in Canada and Latin America: Challenges of the New Millennium. pp. 187–220. doi:10.1007/978-1-4757-3347-1_8.
- Betcha, B (2014). "About the club".
- Clarke, Andrew; Skuterud, Mikal (14 November 2013). "Why Do Immigrant Workers in Australia Perform Better than Those in Canada? Is It the Immigrants or Their Labour Markets?". Canadian Journal of Economics/Revue Canadienne D'économique. 46. doi:10.1111/caje.12059.
- Richardson, Sue; Lester, Laurence (2004). A Comparison of Australian and Canadian Immigration Policies and Labour Market Outcomes (PDF) (Report). ISBN 0642260958. National Library of Australia Bib. ID 3312055. Archived from the original (PDF) on 17 July 2005.
- Sam, Erin (2020). "Bringing Canada Down Under".
