= Carol Bacchi =

Canadian-Australian professor of politics

- Born: April 17, 1948 (age 78); Montreal, Quebec, Canada
- Spouse: Fred Guilhaus
- Children: 1

Academic background
- Education: B.A., 1969, (Magna Cum Laude) Loyola College; M.A., PhD., McGill University
- Thesis: Liberation Deferred: the Ideas of the English-Canadian Suffragists, 1877-1918

Academic work
- Discipline: Political Science
- Sub-discipline: feminist and post-structural policy analyst
- Institutions: University of Adelaide
- Website: carolbacchi.com

Carol Lee Bacchi (born April 17, 1948) is a Canadian-Australian political scientist. She is the Professor Emerita of Politics at the University of Adelaide. She was the first female lecturer appointed by the university in the Politics Department and the first woman to be granted tenure. She was elected a Fellow of the Academy of the Social Sciences in Australia in 2000.

== Education ==
Upon her graduation from Loyola College in 1969, Bacchi was the recipient of the Governor General's Academic Medal and The Knights of Columbus Prize For Canadian History. After earning her PhD in 1976 from McGill University, Bacchi emigrated to Australia.

== Career ==
Bacchi was subsequently hired by the University of Adelaide as a tutor in Australian history. She was also appointed to a teaching position in the Department of History at the University of Newcastle, alongside her husband.

In 1979, Bacchi became the first female lecturer appointed by the University of Adelaide in the Politics Department and the first woman to be granted tenure. In 1983, Bacchi published Liberation deferred? The ideas of the English-Canadian suffragists, 1877-1918, which was based on her thesis from McGill. The basis of the book centered around the idea that the early English-Canadian suffragists did not fail in their goal to enact a revolution amongst women, but rather were promoting the idea of a civil society consisting of British elite. A few years later, Bacchi published Women and Peace Through the Polls through the Peace Research Centre at the Australian National University.

In 1990, Bacchi published Same difference: feminism and sexual difference through Allen & Unwin. At the end of the 1990s, Bacchi also published Women, policy and politics: The construction of policy problems. She was elected a Fellow of the Academy of the Social Sciences in Australia in 2000. The next year, Bacchi was appointed a visiting scholar at the University of Ottawa Research Centre for Women and Politics. In 2003, Bacchi wrote Fear of Food: A Diary of Mothering, which chronicled her struggle with her first sons birth and early childhood. In 2009, she published Analysing Policy: What's the Problem Represented to Be? through Pearson Australia Pty Ltd and retired as an emerita professor. In 2010, Bacchi co-edited a book with Joan Eveline titled Mainstreaming Politics: Gendering Practices and Feminist Theory through the University of Adelaide Press. That same year, she was a visiting professor at two Denmark universities: University of Aalborg and Roskilde University. While there, she presented her paper titled Foucault, Policy and Rule: Challenging the Problem-Solving Paradigm to the Feminist Research Center in Aalborg.

In 2012 Engaging with Carol Bacchi: Strategic Interventions and Exchanges, an edited collection exploring her work, to which she also contributed, was published by the University of Adelaide Press.

In 2014, Bacchi was granted a visiting professor status at Universitat Autònoma de Barcelona. Two years later, she published Poststructural Policy Analysis: A Guide to Practice with Susan Goodwin where they addressed "What's the Problem Represented to Be?" (WRP). They used a post-structural perspective and the works of Foucault to analyze public policy.

In 2017, Bacchi was awarded an honorary doctorate from Umeå University in Sweden.

== Selected publications ==
The following is a list of selected publications:

- Liberation Deferred? The Ideas of the English-Canadian Suffragists, 1877-1918 (1983)
- Same Difference: Feminism and Sexual Difference (1990)
- The Politics of Affirmative Action: 'Women', Equality and Category Politics (1996)
- Women, Policy and Politics: the construction of policy problems (1999)
- Fear of Food: A Diary of Mothering (2003)
- Analysing Policy: What’s the problem represented to be? (2009)
- Poststructural Policy Analysis: A Guide to Practice (2016)
