= New Zealand Canadians =

Total population
- 15,396 identified New Zealand as ethnic origin, 2,500 identified Māori as ethnic origin (by ancestry, 2016 Canadian Census)

Regions with significant populations
- British Columbia, Ontario, Quebec, Alberta

Languages
- New Zealand English · Canadian English · Canadian French

Religion
- Christianity

Related ethnic groups
- New Zealanders · British people · Other Canadians

Distribution of New Zealand-born immigrants living in Canada

New Zealand Canadians are Canadian citizens of New Zealand descent or New Zealand-born people who reside in Canada. According to the 2016 Canadian Census there were 15,396 Canadians who claimed full or partial New Zealand ancestry.

Both are developed countries and share historical connections, language, similar customs and among others, they also have Charles III as their Head of State as both are also Commonwealth realms.

== Notable New Zealand Canadians ==
- Daniel Gillies - actor
- Brent Hodge - filmmaker
- Peter Hogg - constitutional scholar
- Alison Maclean - director
- Aaron Olson - professional basketball player
- Anna Paquin - actress
- Yvonne De Carlo - actress

== See also ==
- Canada–New Zealand relations
- Canadian New Zealanders
- Australian Canadians
