= French New Zealanders =

Franco-néo-zélandais (French)
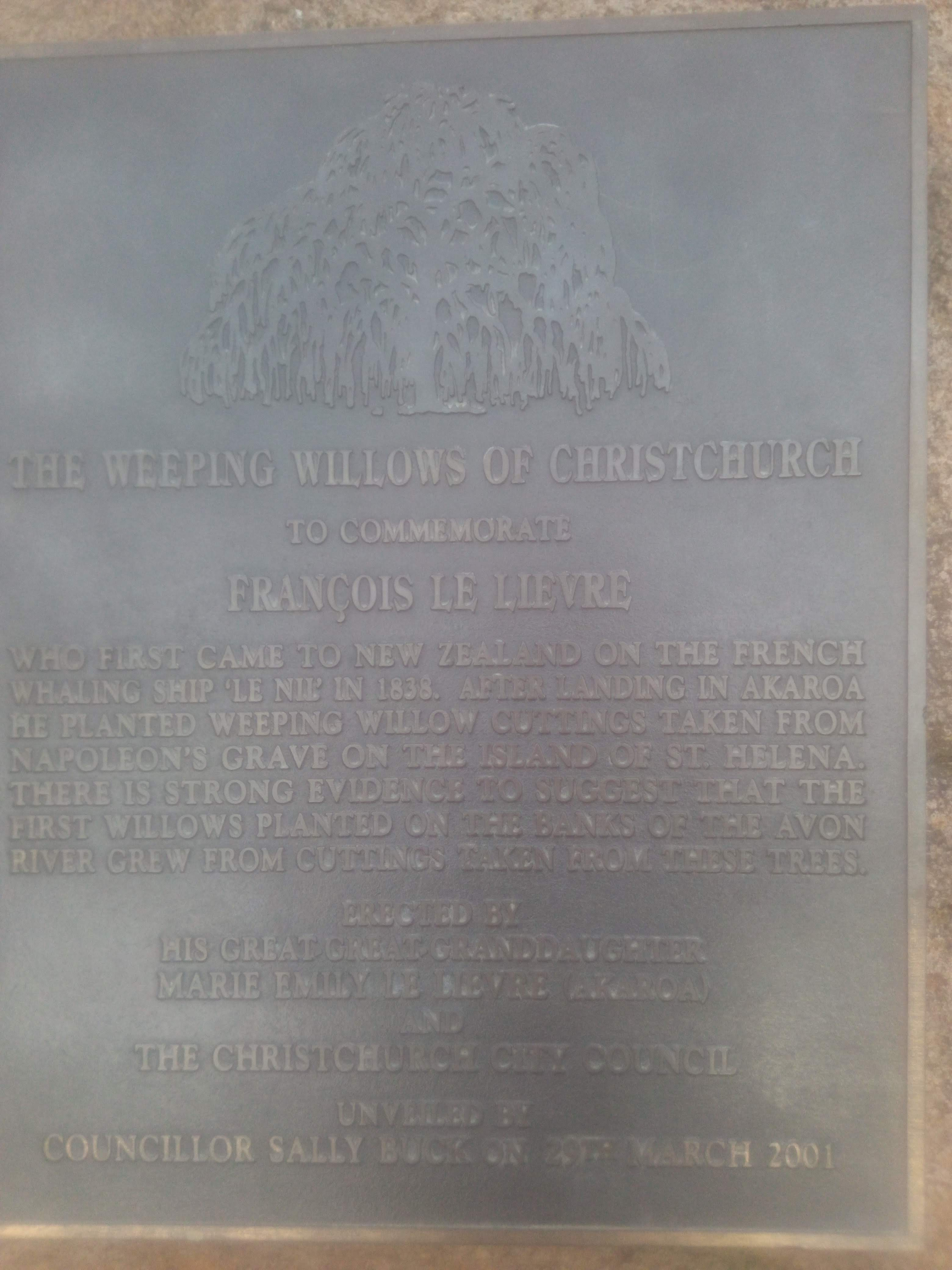
- Plaque in Christchurch, dedicated to French settlers in Akaroa

Total population
- 7,677 (born in France, 2018)

Regions with significant populations
- Auckland; Wellington; Canterbury

Languages
- New Zealand English · French

Religion
- Christianity (mainly Roman Catholicism) · Judaism

Related ethnic groups
- French Australians • French British

French New Zealanders (French: Franco-néo-zélandais) are New Zealanders who are of French ancestors or a French-born person who resides in New Zealand.

The French were among the earlier European settlers in New Zealand, and established a settlement at Akaroa in the South Island.

Captain Jean-François-Marie de Surville is the first known Frenchman to have visited New Zealand, in 1769, and by the 1830s, French whalers were operating off the Banks Peninsula.

French missionaries and priests also had a significant effect on Catholicism in New Zealand. In 1835, Jean-Baptiste Pompallier was the first bishop of any denomination in New Zealand and was known to be sympathetic to Māori interests at the time. Suzanne Aubert came to New Zealand from France in 1860, and founded the Sisters of Compassion in 1892, a religious order of nuns. The cause for her canonization is ongoing, meaning she may become New Zealand's first saint.

== Religion ==
| Religion | Percentage of the French population in New Zealand |
|---|---|
| Catholic | 26.2% |
| Christian (not further defined) | 3.9% |
| Anglican | 3.0% |
| No religion | 50.1% |
| Object to answering | 7.1% |

Source: 2013 Census

== See also ==
- France–New Zealand relations
- Caldoche
- Canadian New Zealanders
- Demographics of New Zealand
- European New Zealanders
- Europeans in Oceania
- French Australians
- History of New Zealand
- Immigration to New Zealand
- Pākehā
