= Canada–New Zealand relations =

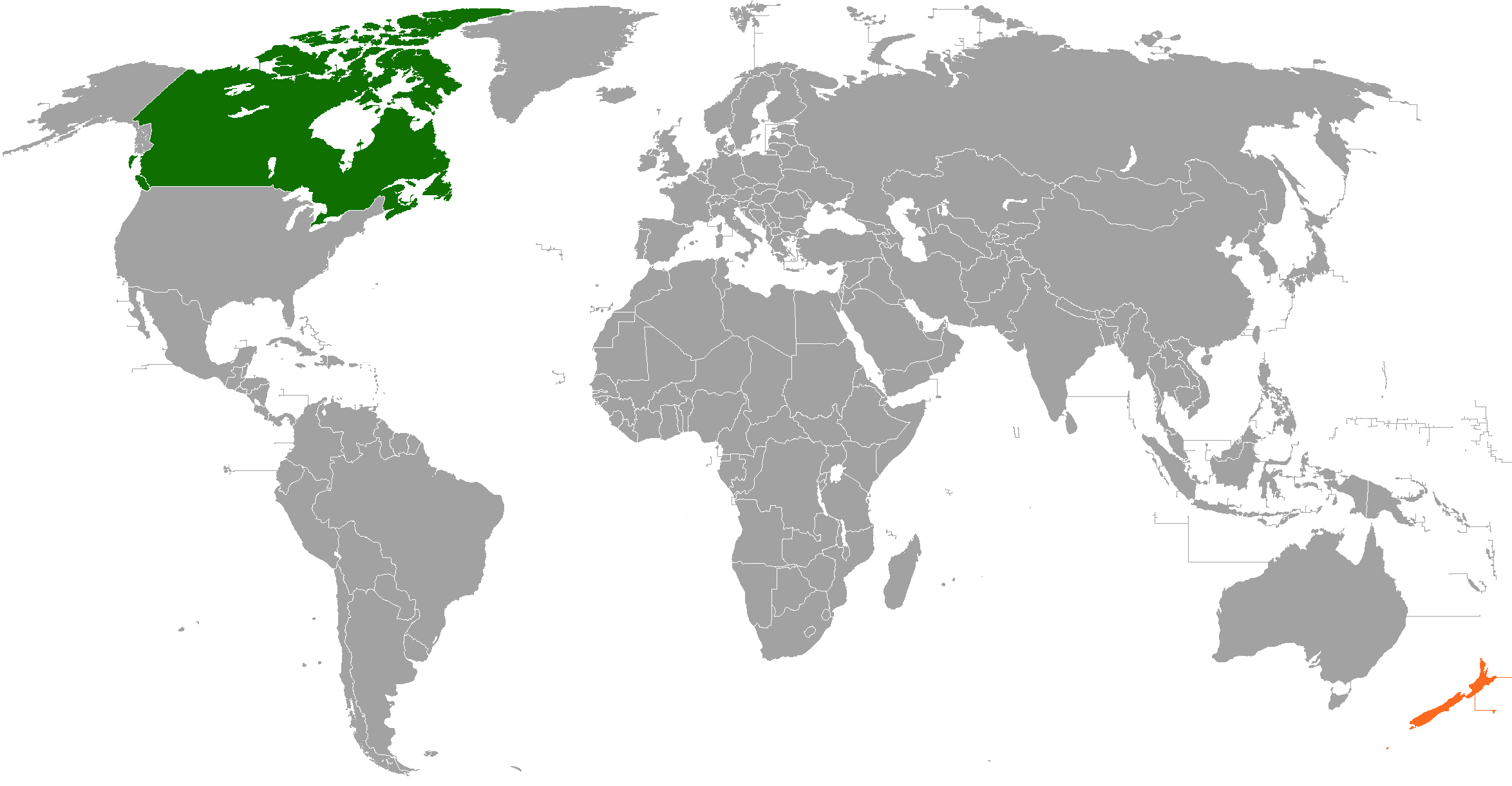

- Canada: New Zealand

Canada and New Zealand have a longstanding relationship fostered by a shared history and culture. The two countries are former British Dominions and have a common head of state in King Charles III (legally, the King is equally and separately the sovereign of both nations, as King of Canada and King of New Zealand). Both nations are members of the Asia-Pacific Economic Cooperation, Cairns Group, Commonwealth of Nations, Five Eyes, OECD and the United Nations.

== Political similarities ==
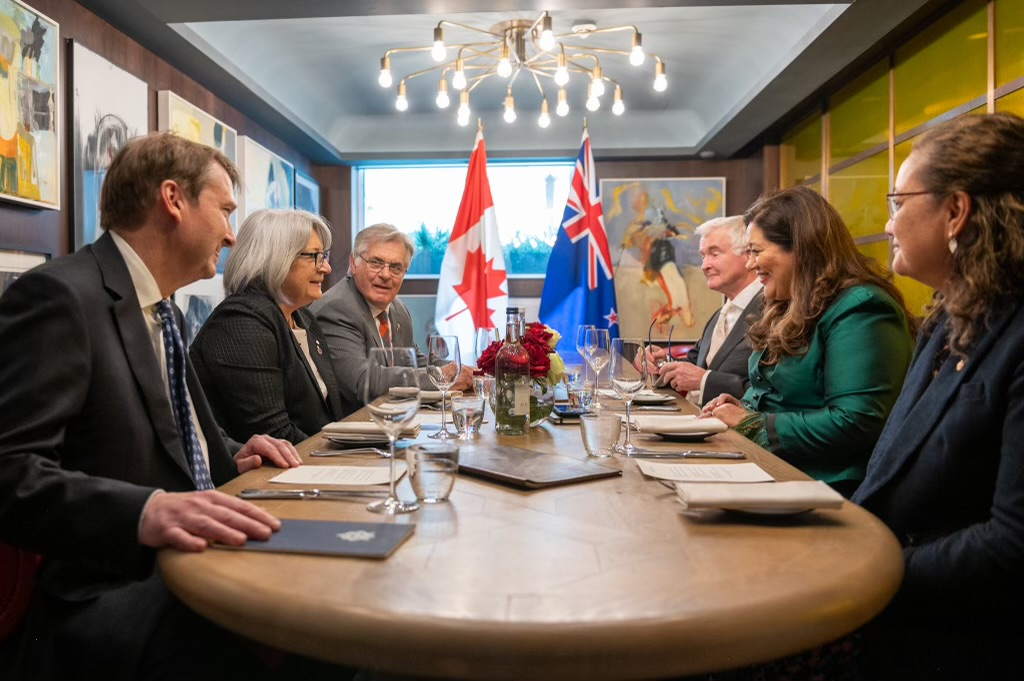
The governors-general of Canada and New Zealand and their spouses and secretaries meeting in London during the Platinum Jubilee of Queen Elizabeth II in 2022. Mary Simon and Dame Cindy Kiro are both indigenous women.

Party politics in New Zealand are fought between the centre-left Labour Party, the centre-right National Party and several smaller parties. In Canada, the main players are the centre-right Conservatives, the centre to centre-left Liberals, the centre-left to left-wing New Democratic Party and the separatist Bloc Québécois. Canada and New Zealand have been compared to one another for them "living in the shadow" of their much more prominent neighbour (the United States and Australia, respectively).

=== Military alliances ===
New Zealand and Canada have fought together in the Second Boer War, World War I, World War II, the Korean War, the Gulf War and the Afghanistan War. Both countries refused to participate in the Iraq War even though other major Anglosphere countries such as the United States, United Kingdom and Australia took part. After 2014, Canadian forces completely withdrew from Afghanistan while a small number of New Zealand forces remained there.

==== Cooperation between military forces ====
Historically their two armed forces have worked alongside each other in a number of international security operations. Recent defence operations include strategic actions in Timor Leste, Bosnia and Afghanistan, training exercises and staff exchanges.

These longstanding defence links with Canada and New Zealand are strengthened by regular purchase of military equipment from either country; e.g. New Zealand's purchase of 105 Light Armoured vehicles (LAV IIIs) from Canada.

==== Wars fought together ====
===== Alliance during World War II =====
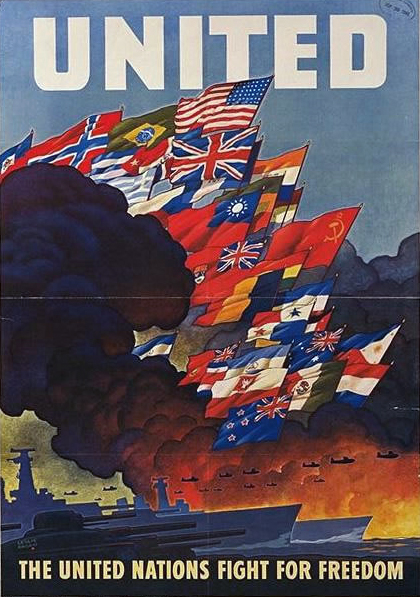
United Nations propaganda poster showing both the New Zealander and former Canadian flag as allied forces in World War II.

As part of their ongoing participation in the British Commonwealth both countries were expected to aid Britain when it declared war on Germany. However, since the Statute of Westminster they had both won the power to declare war independently of Britain. Politically, New Zealand had been a vocal opponent of European fascism and the appeasement of those dictatorships. At the beginning of the war Canada was (for the most part) reluctant to return to war. Nonetheless, both countries entered the war as Allies: New Zealand declared war on Nazi Germany at 9.30 pm September 3, 1939 (NZT); Canada on September 10, 1939. However, the two countries' armies only occasionally fought together. Canada's main effort encompassed major campaigns in Italy and Northern Europe whereas the New Zealanders mainly fought in Greece, Crete and Italy.

===== Korean War (1950–1953) =====
New Zealand and Canada were among those states that responded to the United Nations call for help. New Zealand joined 15 other nations including Canada, the United Kingdom and the United States in the anti-communist war. The Korean War was also significant as it fastened New Zealand's military and diplomatic co-operation in supporting Canada and the United States in conflict.

The British Commonwealth Forces Korea was a joint effort between allied Commonwealth forces: namely Britain, Canada, Australia and New Zealand.

===== Afghanistan (2001–2005) =====
New Zealand and Canada's heaviest joint military involvement in the Middle East in recent decades has been in Afghanistan following the United States-led invasion of that country after the September 11 attacks. Fifty Special Air Service of New Zealand (NZ SAS) units were dispatched and in March 2002 they took part in Operation Anaconda alongside Canadian forces against about 500 to 1,000 al-Qaeda and Taliban forces in the Shahi-Kot Valley and Arma Mountains southeast of Zorma, Afghanistan. New Zealand has also supplied two transport aircraft and a 122-strong tri-service Provincial Reconstruction Team which has been located in Bamyan Province since 2003. Both New Zealand (NZ SAS) and Canadian (Joint Task Force 2) special forces have won the American Presidential Unit Citation for operations in Afghanistan.

"Operation Anaconda" was an operation composed of elements of the United States 10th Mountain Division, 101st Airborne Division, the US special forces groups (TF 11, TF Bowie and TF Dagger), British Royal Marines, Canada's 3rd Battalion Princess Patricia's Canadian Light Infantry, the Afghan National Army, the German KSK and elements of both the Australian Special Air Service Regiment and the New Zealand Special Air Service.

This was one of the first major NZ-Canada joint operations of the War in Afghanistan and proved to be a very successful partnership between the two nations' military forces.

== Trade and investment ==
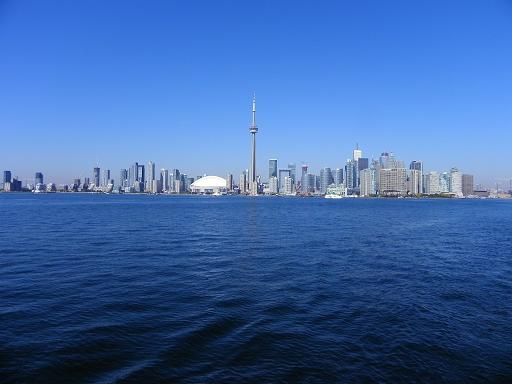
Toronto, the most populous city in Canada.

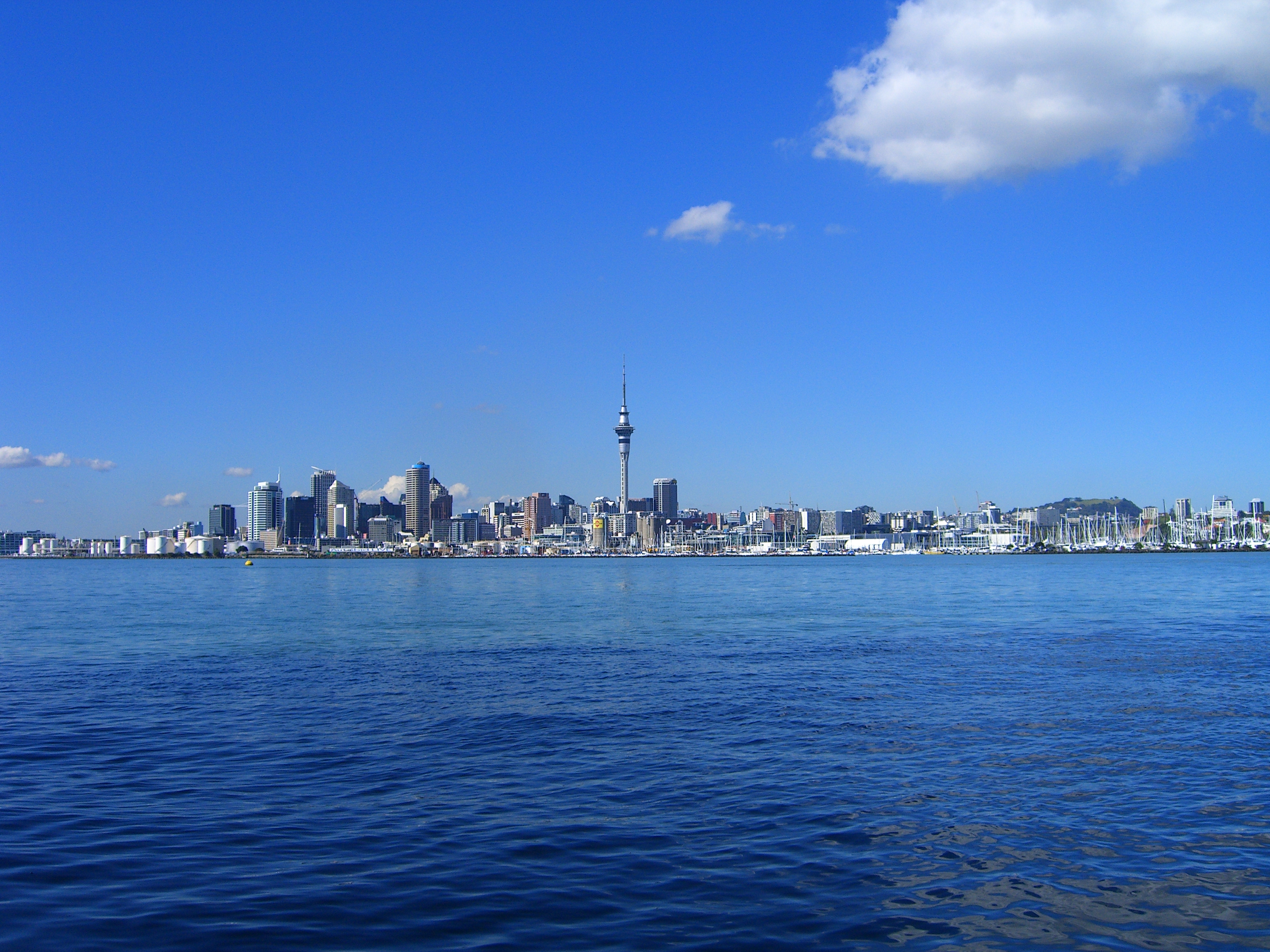
Auckland, the most populous city in New Zealand.

There is mass trade between Canada and New Zealand that has proven reliable to both countries making it an important and stable base for a long-lasting relationship. In 2011, bilateral trade levels totalled (CAD) $932 million. Canadian exports to New Zealand amounted to $382 million, with fertilizers, machinery, meat, books, electrical equipment and wood products being Canada's top exports. Meat and wine were New Zealand's top exports to Canada.

Canada's main exports to New Zealand included aircraft, electrical equipment, machinery and fertilizers for 2006. Canada's leading imports from New Zealand include meat, dairy products, agricultural machinery and wine. New Zealand offers many opportunities for Canadian companies particularly in energy, extractive industries, telecommunications and food products.

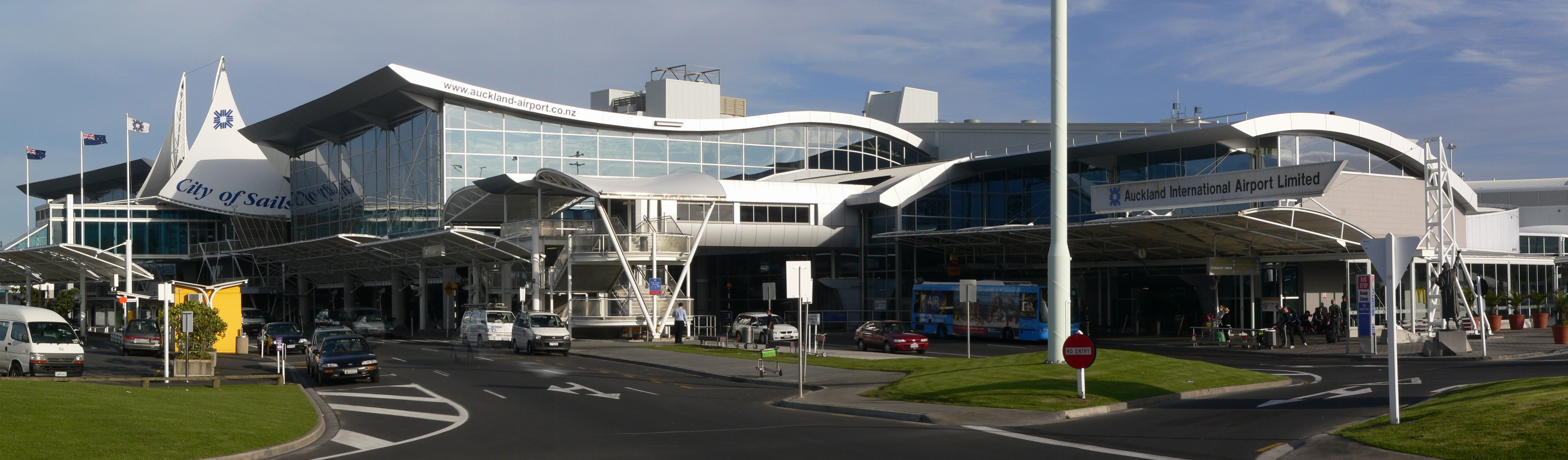
Auckland Airport International Terminal, Auckland, New Zealand.

Canada was New Zealand's 12th largest export destination and 14th largest trading partner in the year ended December 2006 with exports of NZ$553 million. There are significant Canadian investments in New Zealand, particularly McCains and communications company Stratos Global Corporation. New Zealand companies in Canada include Tait Electronics, Michael Hill Jeweller, Fonterra, Peace Software and Glidepath.

=== Auckland Airport CPPIB buyout ===
There was some debate in the New Zealand Government about the Canada Pension Plan Investment Board (CPPIB), the Crown corporation that manages assets on behalf of the Canada Pension Plan, trying to buy a 40% stake in Auckland Airport, a strategic asset for the New Zealand government, with the Labour Party trying to block the sale by passing new laws which prevent foreign acquisitions of New Zealand "strategic assets". It was announced on April 11, 2008, that the CPPIB had given up on its bid on Auckland Airport after many attempts by the New Zealand government to restrict foreign investment in New Zealand's infrastructure. The CPPIB said it was "disappointed in the outcome of its Overseas Investment Act application"

=== Air services ===
The Canada/New Zealand Air Transport Agreement was signed in 1985. Both countries' respective national airlines, Air Canada and Air New Zealand, are members of the Star Alliance. In November 2007, Air New Zealand began a non-stop service between Auckland and Vancouver which operates three times a week.

=== Dairy dispute ===
New Zealand and Canada have had disputes over Canada's protectionist policies towards its dairy industries, which it regarded as a breach of free trade. On 29 December 1997, New Zealand lodged a complaint with the World Trade Organization, arguing that Canada's "special milk classes" scheme was inconsistent with Article XI of the General Agreement on Trade and Tariffs (GATT) 1994, and Articles 3, 8, 9 and 10 of the Agreement on Agriculture. Following arbitration, the two countries reached a mutually agreed solution on 9 May 2003.

On 12 May 2022, New Zealand initiated dispute settlement proceedings against Canada under the Comprehensive and Progressive Agreement for Trans-Pacific Partnership (CPTPP) challenging Canada's CPTPP dairy tariff rate quotas (TRQs). The two governments held consultations in June 2022 but were unable to resolve the dispute. On 7 November, New Zealand requested the establishment of an arbitration panel. Several CPTPP members including Australia, Japan, Mexico, Peru and Singapore also participated as third parties. On 9 March 2023, a panel consisting of Jennifer Hillman, Petros Mavroidis and Colleen Swords was established.

Following submissions by the New Zealand and Canadian sides, a dispute hearing was held in Ottawa between 14 and 15 June 2023. On 6 September 2023, the CPTPP panel ruled in favour of New Zealand, stating that Canada was not administering the dairy TRQs in a way that allowed importers to use them and that Canada's TRQ quota was favouring its domestic dairy processers. New Zealand's Trade Minister Damien O'Connor welcomed the CPTPP's ruling as a victory for New Zealand dairy exporters. The Canadian Government also claimed that the arbitration panel ruled in their favour. Under CPTPP rules, Canada and New Zealand reached an agreement for Canada to implement the Panel's findings by 1 May 2024.

On 14 February 2024, the Dairy Companies Association of New Zealand (DCANZ) rejected new Canadian proposals to modify its dairy TRQ system, claiming it was still insufficient to allow New Zealand dairy exporters fair access to the Canadian market. By 2 May 2024, Canada still had not implemented changes to its dairy tariff rate quotas. In response, New Zealand Trade Minister Todd McClay slammed Canada's refusal to comply with the CPTPP ruling as "cynical" and said that NZ would not back down on the matter.

On 18 October 2024, McClay confirmed that the New Zealand Government had notified the Canadian Government that it would be triggering mandatory negotiations in order to resolve the dairy dispute between the two countries. This marks the first time that a CPTPP member has used this type of negotiation to resolve a trade dispute. Per CPTPP rules, negotiations must start within 15 days. Should they fail, New Zealand could apply tariffs on Canadian goods entering the country. McClay said that the Canadian dairy TRQ system had caused New Zealand to lose NZ$200 million worth in exports over several years and said that escalating the dispute was a matter of honouring free trade agreements. In response, the Canadian Minister of Export Promotion, International Trade and Economic Development Mary Ng and Minister of Agriculture and Agri-Food Lawrence MacAulay announced that the Canadian Government would defend its dairy industry and the dairy TRQ system.

On 18 July, McClay confirmed that the Canadian government had agreed to amend its dairy quota to ease New Zealand dairy imports, which he estimated would deliver up to NZ$157 million to New Zealand dairy exporters.

== Film and television ==
The 1987 Agreement on "Film and Video Relations" between the two countries has been successful with film and television co-operation growing. Particular interest has been shown in indigenous film linkages and co-productions. There is a recent but ongoing pattern of producers' missions between Canada, New Zealand and Australia. Whale Rider won the People's Choice Award at the Toronto International Film Festival in 2002 and nine out of the ten top-grossing centres in North America for New Zealand's Lord of the Rings were in Canada.

One of New Zealand's leading television channels TV3 was, until 2007, owned by Canadian Media Conglomerate CanWest.

== New Zealand, Canada and the UKUSA Community ==
UKUSA Community
- Map of UKUSA Community countries with Ireland Australia Prime Minister Anthony Albanese Canada Prime Minister Mark Carney New Zealand Prime Minister Christopher Luxon United Kingdom Prime Minister Keir Starmer United States President Donald Trump

New Zealand and Canada are both exclusive members of a collection of five countries who participate in the highly secretive ECHELON program. New Zealand has two (known) listening posts run by the Government Communications Security Bureau (GCSB) as part of the ECHELON spy network. New Zealand has benefited from its role in the ECHELON communications interception network which also includes the United States, Australia, Britain and Canada and are known as the UKUSA Community. The partnership gives "a direct line into the inner circles of power in London and Washington". New Zealand's role in the program is based at a listening post on the South Island of New Zealand at Waihopai Valley just south-west of Blenheim. Its primary role is the interception of a large volume of satellite phone calls, telexes, faxes, e-mail and computer data communications. It gathers this data from New Zealand's Asia/Pacific neighbours and forwards it on to the major partners in the UKUSA Agreement.

The Waihopai station is a sister operation to a similar facility run at Tangimoana.

=== UKUSA military exercises ===
The UKUSA community allows member countries to cooperate in multilateral military exercises which have more recently focused on terrorism after 9/11. On March 10, 2008 (NZT) New Zealand, Canada, Australia, the United States and the United Kingdom took part in a multinational war game that simulated a terrorist attack on "strategic networks" such as power grids, financial centres and telecommunications focussing mainly on cyber-terrorism. The exercise was named Cyber Storm 2 and was co-ordinated by the United States Department of Homeland Security and the New Zealand Government Communications Security Bureau. It will be used to identify policies & issues that affect cyber response & recovery by government agencies.

After the exercise the NZ 'CCIP' (Centre for Critical Infrastructure Protection) said in a statement: "The New Zealand component of the exercise was successful in testing information sharing and response coordination across both public and private sectors and national and international cooperation,"

A report on the overall results will be published ahead of Cyber Storm III which is scheduled for 2010.

=== Strategic Alliance Cyber Crime Working Group ===
The Strategic Alliance Cyber Crime Working Group' is a new initiative by Australia, Canada, New Zealand, the United Kingdom and headed by the United States as a "formal partnership between these nations dedicated to tackling larger global crime issues, particularly organized crime". The co–operation consists of "five countries from three continents banding together to fight cyber crime in a synergistic way by sharing intelligence, swapping tools and best practices, and strengthening and even synchronizing their respective laws." This means that there will be increased information sharing between the New Zealand Police and the Royal Canadian Mounted Police (RCMP) on matters relating to serious fraud or cyber crime.

Participants in Cybererstorm II, the SAICCG and ECHELON

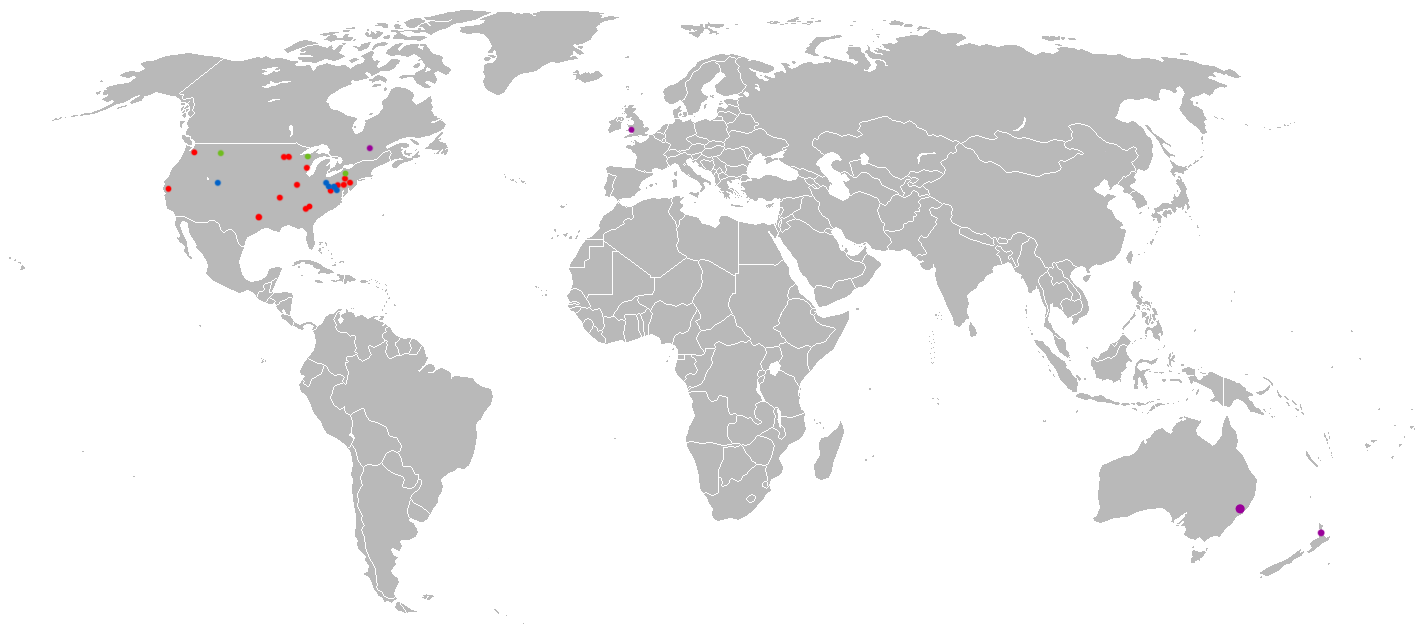
International Participant organizations
US State Participants
US Private Sector Participants
US Federal Participants

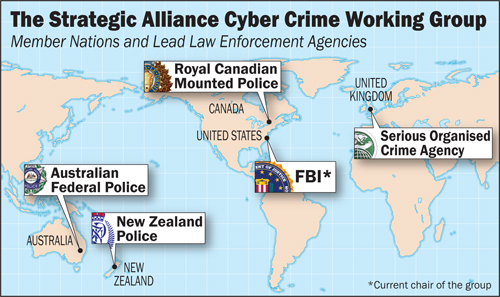
Map showing the Strategic Alliance Cyber Crime Working Group member countries and lead agencies

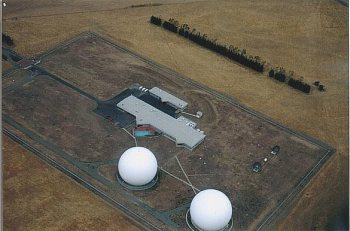
The Waihopai Valley Facility – Base of the New Zealand branch of the ECHELON Program.

== High level visits ==
=== New Zealand visits by Canadian delegates and ministers ===
| Dates | Minister/Delegate | Cities visited | Reason |
|---|---|---|---|
| November 2014 | Prime Minister Stephen Harper | Auckland | Official visit |
| June 2014 | President of the Treasury Board, Tony Clement, | Auckland, Wellington | Prime Minister's Fellow |
| February 2014 | Minister of Foreign Affairs, John Baird, | Auckland, Wellington | Official Visit |
| May 2012 | Minister of International Trade, Ed Fast | Wellington | TPP Negotiations with Tim Groser |
| July/August 2005 | Speaker of the House of Commons of Canada, Peter Milliken | Wellington | Led a multi-party parliamentary delegation to New Zealand |
| Mid-January 2005 | Canadian Minister of National Revenue, John McCallum | | |
| March 2004 | Minister of State (Research, Science and Technology), Joseph Fontana | | APEC Science Ministers' Meeting. |
| August 2003 | Minister of State for Asia Pacific, David Kilgour | | Pacific Islands Forum Post Forum Dialogue |
| 2002 | Minister of State for Asia Pacific, David Kilgour | Wellington | Official visit |
| November 1995 | Prime Minister Jean Chrétien | Auckland | Attending the Commonwealth Heads of Government Meeting |
| May 1970 | Prime Minister Pierre Trudeau | Wellington | Official visit |
| 1958 | Prime Minister John Diefenbaker | Wellington | Official visit |

=== Canadian visits by New Zealand delegates and ministers ===
| Dates | Minister/Delegate | Cities visited | Reason |
|---|---|---|---|
| April 2010 | Prime Minister John Key | Ottawa | Official visit |
| Early November 2007 | Minister of Foreign Affairs (New Zealand), Phil Goff | Vancouver | Led a trade mission to Canada on board the inaugural Air New Zealand Auckland -Vancouver flight |
| September 2007 | Minister of Revenue, Peter Dunne | Ottawa | Met with three Canadian Ministers |
| April 2007 | Chris Carter, Minister for Housing and Ethnic Affairs and Parekura Horomia, Minister of Māori Affairs | | |
| June 2006 | Minister for Social Development (New Zealand), David Benson-Pope | Toronto, Vancouver | |
| June 2005 | Minister of Foreign Affairs (New Zealand), Phil Goff | Ottawa | Official Visit |
| April 2005 | Speaker of the New Zealand House of Representatives, Margaret Wilson | Ottawa, Toronto | High level visits to Canada to lead a parliamentary delegation to Ottawa and Toronto |
| February 2005 | Member of the Labour Party, Ruth Dyson | Ottawa | Official Visit |
| January 2004 | Member of the New Zealand's High Commissioner to the United Kingdom, Jonathan Hunt | Montebello, Quebec | Commonwealth Parliamentary Conference |
| January 2003 | Minister for Trade Negotiations, Jim Sutton | Ottawa | Official visit |
| 2002 | Minister of Immigration and of Commerce Lianne Dalziel | Ottawa | Official visit |
| September 2002 | Minister for Trade Negotiations | Ottawa | Official visit |
| June 2002 | Minister for Science Research and Technology, Pete Hodgson | | Official visit |
| May 2002 | Minister of Social Services and Employment, Steve Maharey | | Official visit |
| January 1999 | Prime Minister Jenny Shipley | Ottawa | Official visit |
| November 1997 | Prime Minister Jim Bolger | Vancouver | Attending APEC summit |
| August 1973 | Prime Minister Norman Kirk | Ottawa | Attending the Commonwealth Heads of Government Meeting |
| October-November 1958 | Prime Minister Walter Nash | Ottawa and Vancouver | Official visit |
| June 1956 | Prime Minister Sidney Holland | Ottawa | Official visit |
| January 1951 | Prime Minister Sidney Holland | Ottawa | Official visit |
| June 1944 | Prime Minister Peter Fraser | Ottawa | Official visit |

== Tourism ==
In the year ending December 2013, 48,192 Canadian tourists visited New Zealand, making Canada the eighth largest source of tourists. Canadians can visit New Zealand without a visa for up to three months and New Zealanders can visit Canada without a visa for up to six months, provided they meet financial, health and character requirements.

Both Canada and New Zealand offer "Working Holiday Schemes". These schemes allow young students to travel to New Zealand or Canada and to take temporary employment as needed to cover the expenses of their visit. Canadian participants receive the same treatment as New Zealand nationals in all matters concerning the application of laws, regulations and practices regarding health and working conditions. On November 14, 2014 Prime Minister Stephen Harper and Prime Minister John Key agreed to extend the Working Holiday Scheme from 12 months to 23 months. This new visa came into effect on April 1, 2015. This is the most generous working holiday scheme New Zealand has with any other country, including the United Kingdom.

In the 2010s, there has been growing support for the idea of freedom of movement between the UK, Canada and Australia, New Zealand with citizens able to live and work in any of the four countries – similar to the Trans-Tasman Travel Arrangement between Australia and New Zealand.

There are direct flights between both nations with Air Canada and Air New Zealand.

== Disaster relief ==
In mid July 2025, New Zealand dispatched 45 firefighters to assist with combating the 2025 Canadian wildfires, which had affected parts of Manitoba.

== Resident diplomatic missions ==
of Canada in New Zealand

- Wellington (High Commission).

of New Zealand in Canada

- Ottawa (High Commission).
- Vancouver (Consulate-General)

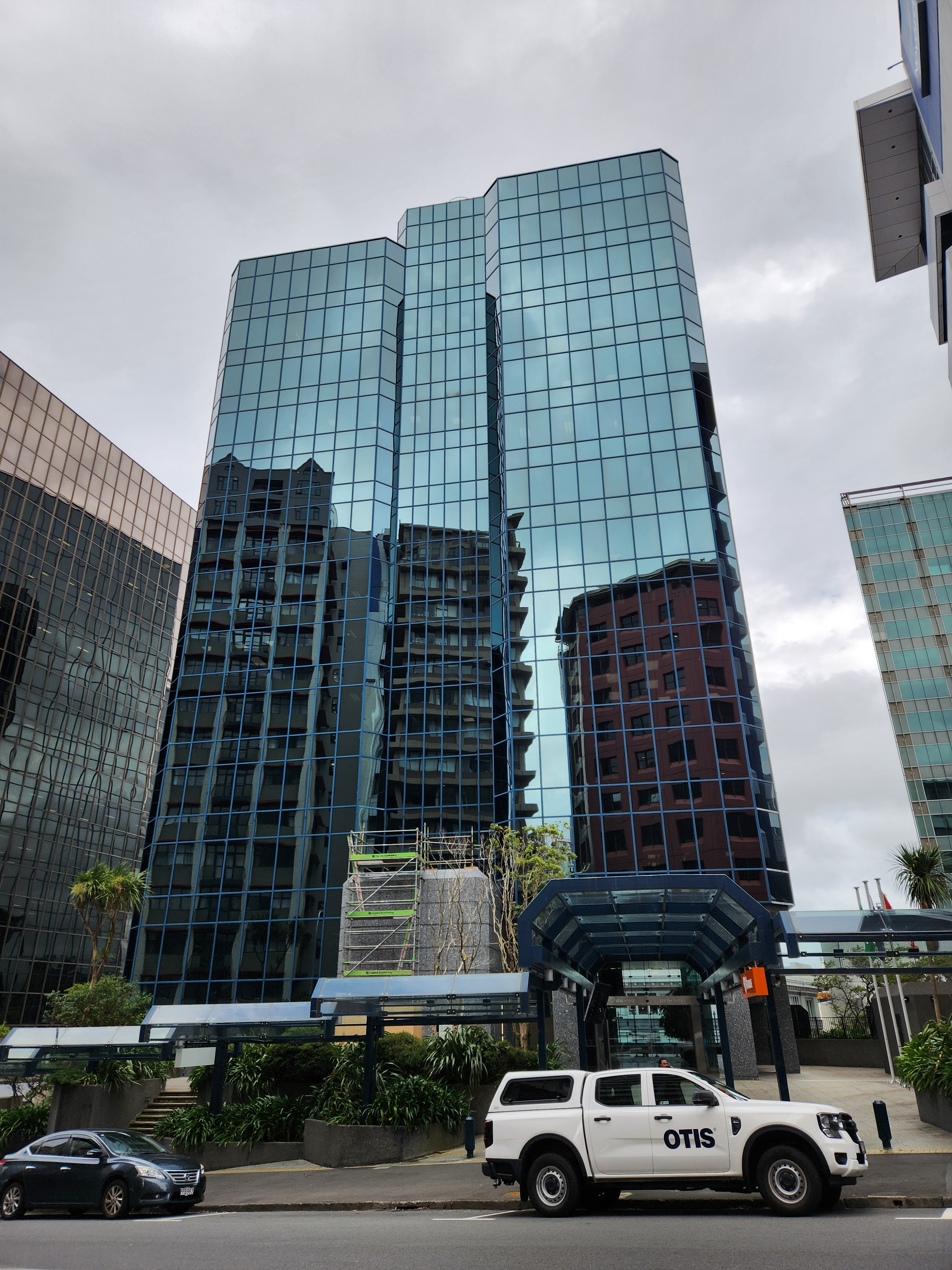
Building hosting the Canadian high commission in Wellington

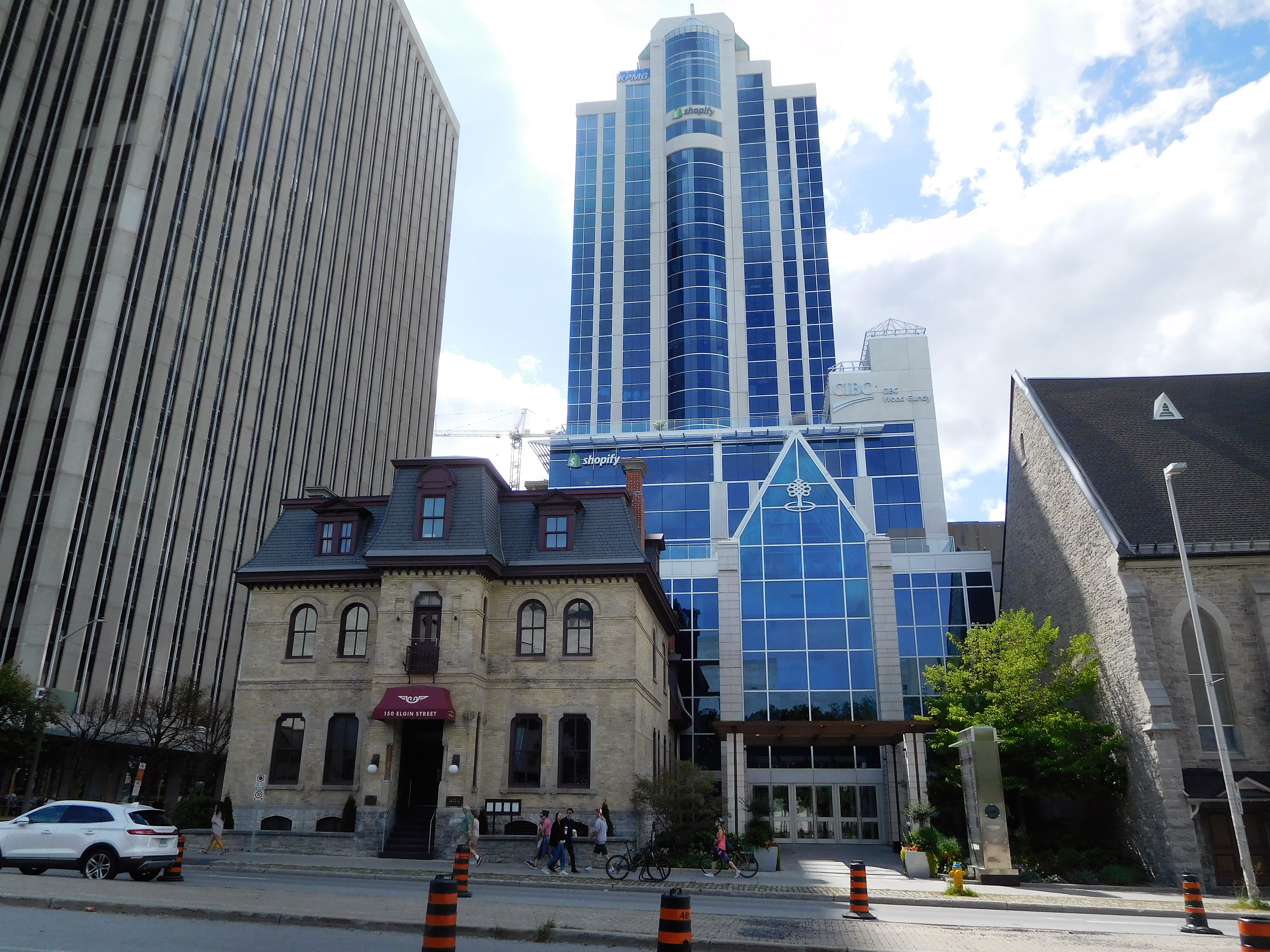
Building hosting the New Zealand high commission in Ottawa

== See also ==
- Foreign relations of New Zealand
- Foreign relations of Canada
- List of high commissioners of Canada to New Zealand
- List of high commissioners from New Zealand to Canada
- AUSCANNZUKUS
- Canadian New Zealanders
- New Zealand Canadians
