= French Australians =

Ethnic group

Australiens d'origine française (French)

Total population
- French; 36,028 (by birth, 2021); 148,922 (by ancestry, 2021)

Regions with significant populations
- France-born people by state or territory
- New South Wales: 8,936
- Victoria: 5,615
- Queensland: 4,980
- Western Australia: 2,792
- South Australia: 1,616

Languages
- Australian English; French

Religion
- No Religion 55.1%; Roman Catholic 30.2%; Not Stated 3.8%; Protestant (Huguenot) 1.5%; Islam 1.3%

Related ethnic groups
- French people; Canadian Australians; Québécois; Cajuns; Acadians; Franco-Mauritians; French New Zealanders

French Australians (French: Australiens d'origine française), are Australian citizens or residents of French ancestry, or French-born people who reside in Australia. According to the 2021 Census, there were 148,922 people of French descent in Australia and 36,028 French-born people residing in the country. The largest French Australian community is in the state of New South Wales.

== Demography ==
People with French ancestry as a percentage of the population in Sydney divided geographically by postal area, as of the 2011 census.

According to the 2006 Australian census, 98,332 Australians (or 0.47% of the population) claim French ancestry, either alone or with another ancestry. Of these, 19,186 were born in France and 12,735 of them had since acquired Australian citizenship.

8,281 (or 43%) of the residents born in France had arrived in Australia in 1979 or earlier.

French Australian demography by religion (note that it include only French born in France and not australian with French ancestries)
Religious group	2021 (Note: Religious breakdown proportions based on "French" ethnic or cultural origin response on the 2021 census.)		2016 (Note: Religious breakdown proportions based on "French" ethnic or cultural origin response on the 2016 census.)		2011 (Note: Religious breakdown proportions based on "French" ethnic or cultural origin response on the 2011 census.)	
Religious group	Pop.	%	Pop.	%	Pop.	%
Catholic	10,894 ▼	30.25% ▼	11,216 ▲	36.04% ▼	11,093	44.96%
Eastern Orthodox	183 ▼	0.51% ▼	201 ▼	0.65% ▼	220	0.89%
Protestant and Other christian	1,762 ▲	4.89% ▼	1,675 ▼	5.38% ▼	1,730	7.01%
(Total Christian)	12,845 ▼	35.66% ▼	13,098 ▲	42.09% ▼	13,041	52.85%
Islam	485 ▲	1.35% ▲	263 ▲	0.85% ▼	212	0.86%
No religion	20,159 ▲	55.97% ▲	14,683 ▲	47.18% ▲	8,776	35.57%
Buddhism	359 ▼	1% ▼	378 ▲	1.21% ▼	350	1.42%
Hinduism	90 ▲	0.25% ▼	86 ▲	0.28% ▼	77	0.31%
Judaism	470 ▲	1.3% ▲	398 ▼	1.28% ▼	461	1.87%
Other	86 ▼	0.24% ▼	81 ▼	0.26% ▼	106	0.43%
Not stated	1,527 ▼	4.24% ▼	2,138 ▲	6.87% ▲	1,659	6.72%
Total French Australian population	36,019 ▲	100%	31,120 ▲	100%	24,675	100%

French Australian demography by religion (Ancestry included)
Religious group	2021		2016		2011	
Religious group	Pop.	%	Pop.	%	Pop.	%
Catholic	53,768 ▼	29.07% ▼	56,599 ▲	33.99% ▼	52,584	38.93%
Eastern Orthodox	880 ▲	0.48%	792 ▲	0.48% ▼	770	0.57%
Protestant and Other christian	29,271 ▼	15.83% ▼	32,147 ▲	19.31% ▼	29,130	21.57%
(Total Christian)	83,930 ▼	45.38% ▼	89,539 ▲	53.78% ▼	82,485	61.07%
Islam	1,225 ▲	0.66% ▲	781 ▲	0.47% ▼	683	0.51%
No religion	90,236 ▲	48.79% ▲	63,825 ▲	38.33% ▲	40,066	29.66%
Buddhism	1,643 ▼	0.89% ▼	1,775 ▲	1.07% ▼	1,596	1.18%
Hinduism	291 ▲	0.16% ▼	280 ▲	0.17% ▼	242	0.18%
Judaism	1,431 ▲	0.77% ▼	1,314 ▼	0.79% ▼	1,426	1.06%
Other	803 ▲	0.43% ▼	742 ▼	0.45% ▼	824	0.61%
Not stated	5,393 ▼	2.92% ▼	8,257 ▲	4.96% ▼	7,761	5.75%
Total French Australian population	184,946 ▲	100%	166,506 ▲	100%	135,074	100%

== History ==
Bruni d'Entrecasteaux, Jean-Michel Huon de Kermadec, Lapérouse, Louis Antoine de Bougainville, Jules Dumont d'Urville, Nicolas Baudin, François Péron and Marc-Joseph Marion du Fresne were some of the early European explorers to reach the continent. Francis Barrallier explored the Blue Mountains.

Many Australians with French ancestry are descended from Huguenot refugees. Some of the earliest Huguenots to arrive in Australia held prominent positions in English society, notably Jane Franklin and Charles La Trobe.

Others who came later were from poorer Huguenot families. They migrated to Australia from England in the nineteenth and early twentieth centuries to escape the poverty in the East End of London, notably in the Huguenot enclaves of Spitalfields and Bethnal Green. Their impoverishment had been brought about by the effect of the Industrial Revolution, which caused the collapse of the Huguenot-dominated silk-weaving industry.

A number of French orders of priests, nuns and brothers have contributed to the Catholic Church in Australia. They included the teaching orders of the De La Salle Brothers, Marist Brothers and Marist Sisters. The prominent school St Joseph's College, Hunters Hill was founded by the French Marist Brother Emilian Pontet in 1881. The Marist Fathers staffed parishes and conducted missionary activities in the South Pacific. The Missionaries of the Sacred Heart, based in Kensington, New South Wales, ran missions in remote Australia and New Guinea.

French architectural influence is still visible in Hunters Hill, not only in church buildings but also but in private houses built by the unusually large number of French settlers in the suburb.

The largest post-war increase in French migration to Australia came during the 1960s and 1970s; unlike many other European countries, France did not establish a migration scheme in the immediate post-war period due to chronic underemployment, despite Australia seeing the French as some of the most desirable immigrants to obtain during that era.

Since that time, there has only been a small flow of French immigrants to Australia. Many people in the French-Australian community now originate from French overseas territories, especially New Caledonia.

== Culture ==
Today, the Brisbane French Festival, held over the Bastille Day weekend, is Australia's biggest French festival. Participants include both French-born Australians and Australians of more distant French ancestry.

Alliance Française has an active presence in most Australian cities, teaching the French language, holding cultural events such as Beaujolais Nouveau festivals and sponsoring the nation's annual French film festival. SBS has also done much to increase the popularity of French cinema and culture with Australian audiences, though Hollywood still predominates with mainstream audiences.

Some Australians of French Huguenot descent have completely assimilated into the country's predominantly Anglo-Saxon culture but most still identify themselves as Huguenots, even hundreds of years after being exiled. The Huguenot Society of Australia does much to encourage Australian Huguenots to embrace their cultural heritage and provides genealogical research services.

French cuisine has influenced the nation with French-inspired cafes, restaurants and boulangeries to be found in most major cities. French immigrant chefs, particularly those who appear on television, have done much to promote French cooking and food philosophy, including a growing understanding of the concept of terroir.

The French Benevolent Society has an active presence in the nation, providing a support network for elderly and incapacitated French Australians.

Most of the French-born people in Australia are Roman Catholics and the Reformed Church of France (Église Réformée de France) is yet to establish a presence in the country, despite the vibrant group of Australians of Huguenot descent. However, Taizé-style services are becoming increasingly popular with both Roman Catholics and Protestants from a variety of denominations. Taizé provides one of the key grassroots ecumenical movements in the nation.

== Education ==
French international schools in Australia include:

- Lycée Condorcet (Sydney)
- Telopea Park School (Canberra)
- Auburn High School (Melbourne)
- Tingalpa State School/École publique de Tingalpa (Brisbane)
- École maternelle franco-australienne Red Hill (Canberra)
- Section Française de Caulfield Junior College/École française de Melbourne (Melbourne)

== See also ==
- Alliance française
- Australia–France relations
- Bretons
- Caldoche
- Canadian Australians
- Dragonnade
- European Australians
- Europeans in Oceania
- French diaspora
- History of France
- Huguenot cross
- Huguenot
- Immigration to Australia
- List of Huguenots
- Reformed Church of France
- Religion in France
- Revocation of the Edict of Nantes
- Taizé Community
