= Australian Canadians =

Ethnic group in Canada

Total population
- 46,765 (by ancestry, 2021 Census)

Regions with significant populations
- British Columbia, Ontario, Alberta

Languages
- Australian English; Australian Aboriginal languages; Canadian English; Canadian French

Religion
- Christianity; Judaism; Others

Related ethnic groups
- Australians; British people; Other Canadians

Australian Canadians are Canadian citizens or residents with Australian ancestry. There are three groups of Australian Canadians, including Australian immigrants to Canada, descendants of Australian immigrants to Canada, and Australian expatriates residing in Canada. According to the 2021 Census, there were 46,765 Canadians who claimed full or partial Australian ancestry. Historically, most Australian Canadians lived in the western provinces of Canada, however in 2016, the most popular cities for Australian immigrants are Vancouver and Toronto. While the number of Australian Canadians is quite low relative to other countries, the number of Australians on working visas in Canada is extremely high.

Both countries are among the most developed countries and share historical connections, language and similar customs. Further, both Canada and Australia have Charles III as their Head of State as both are also Commonwealth realms.

== History ==
Both Canada and Australia are former British colonies, which forms the basis of early movement and migration between the two countries. In the 19th century, however, movement was primarily from Canada to Australia with Canadian convicts being exiled to Australia. Historians attribute the relatively low number of Australian Canadians to the fact that both countries relied on immigration and competed for immigrants from Britain.

Following the Confederation of Canada in 1867 and again after the Federation of Australia in 1901, government relations between the two countries strengthened, and immigration from Australia to Canada increased. In 1941, the number of Australian-born Canadians was 2,800, most of whom lived in the western provinces of Canada.

Following World War II, the number of Australian Canadians grew gradually, with many Australian professionals moving to Canada for economic opportunity. In the 1960s, working conditions were similar between Canada and Australia, however, salaries were higher in Canada which was appealing for Australian migrants during this time. Hence, the number of Australian Canadians increased through the 1960s and peaked in 1967, with five thousand Australians entering Canada for work or education. From the 1960s to 2000, the number of Australians migrating to Canada increased when the Australian economy declined and decreased as the economy improved. Following the Canadian Immigration Act in 1976, which made it difficult for foreigners to find work if Canadians were qualified for the role, there was a decline in Australians moving to Canada.

In the 21st century, the ease of working holiday and student visas in Canada has led to a strong Australian expatriate culture, and between 2006 and 2016, the number of Australians living in Canada doubled. Since 2015, there has been support for and discussion of opening up Freedom of Movement between Australia and Canada, as well as the United Kingdom and New Zealand, which would allow Australians the right to live and work freely in Canada without applying for visas, and vice versa. Of Australian Canadians in 2016, 23.5% arrived between 2011 and 2016.

== Demographics ==
In the 2016 Canadian Census, 42,315 people identified Australia as their ethnic origin, of who 14,370 were first-generation Canadian, 16,410 were second-generation Canadian and 11,530 were third-generation Canadian. The most popular cities for Australian immigrants to Canada are Vancouver and Toronto, making up almost half of the total, with 4,520 and 3,775 immigrant residents respectively.

=== Immigration patterns: migrants to Canada born in Australia ===
Australian immigrant population, by place of residence and period of immigration
	Period of immigration						
Province/territory of residence	Before 1981	1981 to 1990	1991 to 2000	2001 to 2005	2006 to 2010	2011 to 2016	Total Australian immigrant population
Alberta	870	320	415	275	425	1,065	3,360
British Columbia	3,180	675	1,060	730	1,055	1,925	8,605
Manitoba	120	40	55	30	45	85	370
New Brunswick	30	10	30	30	-	20	110
Newfoundland and Labrador	-	10	-	-	20	25	55
Northwest Territories	-		10	-	10		20
Nova Scotia	95	20	15	40	50	35	260
Nunavut	-	-	-	-	-	-	-
Ontario	2,770	580	780	605	815	1,540	7,080
Prince Edward Island	15	-	10	-	10	-	30
Quebec	320	80	70	45	110	200	790
Saskatchewan	125	50	75	20	25	85	375
Yukon	10	10	-	-	20	10	50
Total Canada	7,695	1,595	2,515	1,780	2,560	4,965	21,115

Source: (Statistics Canada, 2017)

=== Reliability of census data on Australian Canadians ===
John Powell (2009) has proposed that numbers of Australian Canadians were in fact higher than what was represented in census data throughout the 19th and 20th centuries. The measure of ‘ethnic origin’ may underrepresent the number of Australians in Canada because of how it can be interpreted. As such, to some people 'ethnic origin' may connote 'country of earliest ancestry' rather than last residence or partial ancestry. It is argued that because Australia is a country of immigrants, many migrants who arrived from Australia to Canada may have immigrated to Australia previously or be first-generation Australians.

Another factor that is argued to contribute to the underrepresentation of Australian Canadians in census data is the cultural similarities between the two countries. It is argued that because the cultures are similar and ethnic difference is non-visible, individuals may identify less with their Australian heritage and thus not report it as their 'ethnic origin' when surveyed.

== Australian expatriate community in Canada ==
Australian expatriates (expats) in Canada refer to Australian citizens who temporarily or permanently reside in Canada. This group is not fully represented in census data, because often they are not permanent residents, but instead are living in Canada on working holiday visas or student visas.

There are a number of expatriate groups across Canada, which allow Australian communities to form through sports events and social activities. Australian Football League (AFL) competitions are held in six Canadian provinces, but are most popular in Ottawa and Ontario.

=== Working holidays ===
International Experience Canada (IEC) work permits allow young people to work and travel in Canada for up to 24 months. Under the Reciprocal Youth Mobility Agreement, Australians between the age of 18 and 35 are eligible to apply for an IEC visa. Previously the upper age limit was 30 years old, and was recently increased to 35 in the 2019 IEC season.

For Australians, there are three IEC categories available:

1. Working Holiday: Allows visa holders to move between employers and locations. This is the most popular IEC permit for Australians.
2. Young Professionals: Individuals on this visa are required to have obtained a job before applying, which must be considered skilled and within the candidate's established career path, area of expertise or field of study.
3. International Co-Op (Internship): Allows Australian students to complete a work placement in Canada as work experience and credit toward their tertiary studies.

Australia is the only IEC country where applicants are not selected based on quotas, meaning they receive an unlimited number of IEC work permits. Australians make up 17.7% of the total Working Holiday visitors under IEC in Canada, which is the highest-ranking country of citizenship. The most popular destinations for Australians on working holidays are Whistler and Banff. Australia is also a highly popular destination for Canadians on working holidays, hence highlighting the reciprocity of the popularity of destinations.

=== Australian students in Canada ===
Canadian study permits allow students from Australia to become temporary residents for the duration of their university or college degree. In 2018, there were 710 Australians with study permits living in Canada. Since 2000, the year with the highest number of Australians with Canadian study permits was 2001, with 1210 students. The total number of Australian students in Canada is much larger, however, as study permits are not required to engage in student exchange programs. The similarity between cultures of Australia and Canada is a strong reason that Australian students choose to study in Canada. Furthermore, Canadian policy, as part of international education strategy, offers the opportunity for Australians to continue living in Canada following their studies.

==== International study programs ====
Australians studying at all Australian universities have access to study abroad programs, whereby students can study for up to one year at a Canadian university as part of their Australian degree without needing a study permit. In 2001, 15.7% of all Australians studying abroad were in Canada, however, this number has declined as the popularity of Asian countries as study destinations has increased. In 2012, just 1,277 Australian students went on exchange to Canada. In 2015, two-thirds of Australian exchange students in Canada were studying humanities or business-related courses.

There is currently funding and scholarship opportunities for Australian students in Canada from both the Australian and Canadian governments. This includes fee-paying scholarships, fellowships and research grants. Additionally, both governments are funding institutional partnerships that Australians can participate in Canada as part of their university degree.

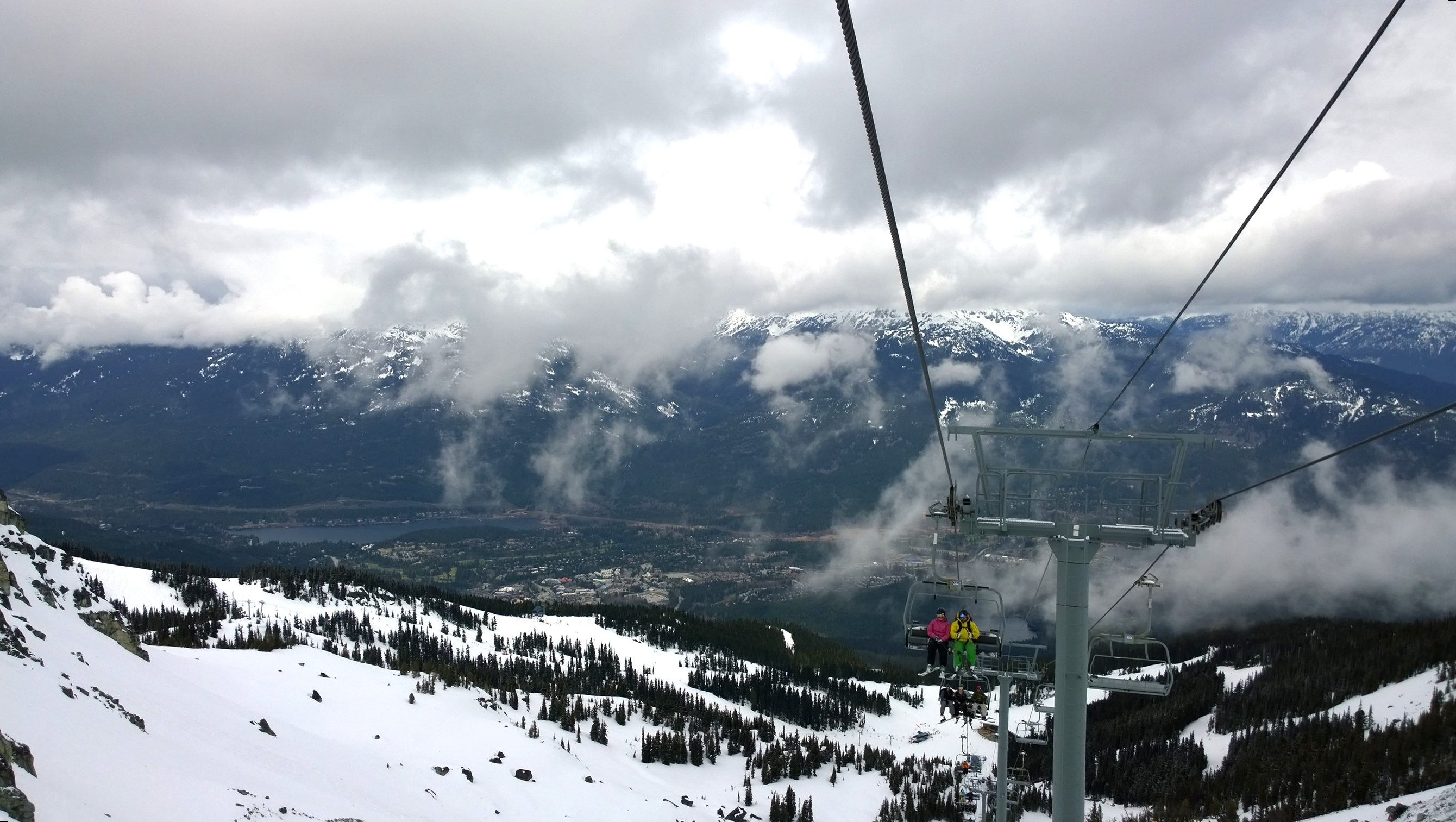
View from chairlift at Whistler Blackcomb ski resort, 2014

=== Australian presence in British Columbia ===
The town of Whistler, British Columbia holds a congregation of Australians and has been described as a ‘Little Australia’ due to the strong Australian culture present. Australian Alpine skier Jono Brauer coined the term "Whistralia" to refer to the ski village in an interview in 2010, and this has since become a nickname. In 2010 it was estimated that Australians made up 34% of the workforce for Whistler-Blackcomb ski resort. Australian snacks such as meat pies, Tim Tams and Vegemite are sold at supermarkets in Whistler, and Australia Day is celebrated, with multiple pubs throwing organised party events.

== Notable Australian Canadians ==
=== Musicians ===
Name	Born - died	Notable for	Connection with Australia	Connection with Canada
Howard Leyton-Brown	1918 – 2017	Musician and music educator	Born in Australia	Migrated to Canada in 1952, died in Regina, Saskatchewan
Rachel Cavalho	1907 – 2002	Pianist and music educator	Born in Australia	Migrated to Canada in 1948
William McKie	1901 – 1984	Musician, director of Westminster Abbey and producer of music for Queen Elizabeth's wedding and coronation	Born in Australia	Migrated to Canada in 1963, died in Ottawa

=== Sport ===
Name	Born - died	Notable for	Connection with Australia	Connection with Canada
Tommy Dunderdale	1887 – 1960	Professional ice hockey player in Canada	Born in Australia	Migrated to Canada in 1894
Steve Badger	1956 –	Swimmer, has represented both Australia and Canada	Born in Sydney, New South Wales	Migrated to Canada in 1974

=== Artists ===
Name	Born - died	Notable for	Connection with Australia	Connection with Canada
Colin Vaughan	1931 – 2000	Architect and urban activist	Born in Sydney, New South Wales	Migrated to Montreal, Quebec in 1950s
John Hamilton Andrews	1933 –	Architect	Born in Australia	Migrated to Canada in 1958

=== Authors and academics ===
Name	Born - died	Notable for	Connection with Australia	Connection with Canada
Thomas Griffith Taylor	1880 – 1963	First professor of geography at University of Sydney, and professor of geography at University of Toronto in 1935.	Migrated from Britain to Australia in 1883, grew up in Sydney, New South Wales	Migrated to Canada in 1935
Janette Turner Hospital	1942 –	Writer and professor at several Canadian universities	Born in Australia	Lived in Canada
Mollie Gillen	1908 – 2009	Historian and writer	Born in Sydney, New South Wales	Migrated to Canada in 1941, died in Toronto, Ontario

=== Business, politics and public service ===
Name	Born - died	Notable for	Connection with Australia	Connection with Canada
John Peter Lee Roberts	1930 –	Musician and cultural policy advisor, awarded Member (1981) and then Officer (1995) of the Order of Canada	Born in Australia	Migrated to Canada in 1955
Adam Vaughan	1961 –	Politician for Canadian Liberal Party, current Member of Parliament for Spadina-Fort York	Australian father (Colin Vaughan)	Born in Canada
Helen Cooper	1946 –	Canadian politician, former mayor of Kingston, Ontario	Born in Australia	Migrated to Canada in childhood
Yuri Leith Fulmer	1974 –	Philanthropist and entrepreneur	Mother was Australian, born in Perth, Western Australia	Father was Canadian, migrated to Vancouver, British Columbia in 1992
John Best	1861 – 1923	Politician for Canadian Conservative Party and Unionist Party, former Member of Parliament for Dufferin	Born in Australia	Migrated to Canada
Katie Telford	1978 –	Public servant, chief of staff to Prime Minister Justin Trudeau	Australian father	Born in Canada
Andrew Wilkinson	1957/58 –	MLA for Vancouver-Quilchena, Leader of BC Liberal Party and Leader of the Opposition in British Columbia	Born in Brisbane, Queensland	Migrated to British Columbia at 4, became Canadian citizen

=== Actors/actresses ===
Name	Born - died	Notable for	Connection with Australia	Connection with Canada
Rhiannon Fish	1991 –	Actress	Migrated to Australia at the age of four	Born in Calgary, Alberta with dual citizenship
Luke Ford	1981 –	Actor	Moved to Sydney, Australia at a young age and migrated there	Born in Vancouver, British Columbia
Helene Joy	1978 –	Actress	Born in Australia	Migrated to Vancouver, British Columbia
Peter Kelamis	1967 –	Voice actor	Born in Australia	Migrated to Vancouver, British Columbia, became Canadian citizen
Scott McNeil	1962 –	Voice actor	Born in Australia	Migrated to Vancouver, British Columbia, became Canadian citizen

=== Others ===
Name	Born - died	Notable for	Connection with Australia	Connection with Canada
Allyson McConnell	1978-2013	Convicted murderer	Born in Australia	Migrated to British Columbia from Gosford and then to Millet, Alberta where she drowned her two sons in 2010. Died by suicide in Sydney.

== See also ==
- Australia–Canada relations
- Statistics Canada
- Canadian Australians
- New Zealand Canadians
- CANZUK
- Little Australia
