= Danilo Bacchi =

Italian footballer (born 1983)

Personal information
- Date of birth: 8 February 1983 (age 43)
- Place of birth: Rome, Italy
- Position: Defender

Team information
- Current team: Celano

Senior career*
Years	Team	Apps	(Gls)
2003–2004	Tivoli	21	(0)
2004–2005	Rosetana	18	(0)
2005–2006	Viterbese	0	(0)
2006–2007	Gela	24	(0)
2007–2008	Celano	22	(0)
2008–2009	Paganese	24	(1)
2009	Cavese	9	(1)
2010–	Celano	11	(0)
- * Club domestic league appearances and goals as of 12:40, 4 May 2010 (UTC)

Danilo Bacchi (born 8 February 1983) is an Italian association football defender who currently plays for Celano F.C. Olimpia.

== Caps on Italian Series ==
Serie C1 : 24 Caps, 1 Goal

Serie C2 : 85 Caps

Total : 109 Caps, 1 Goal
