= Caldoche =

European inhabitants of New Caledonia

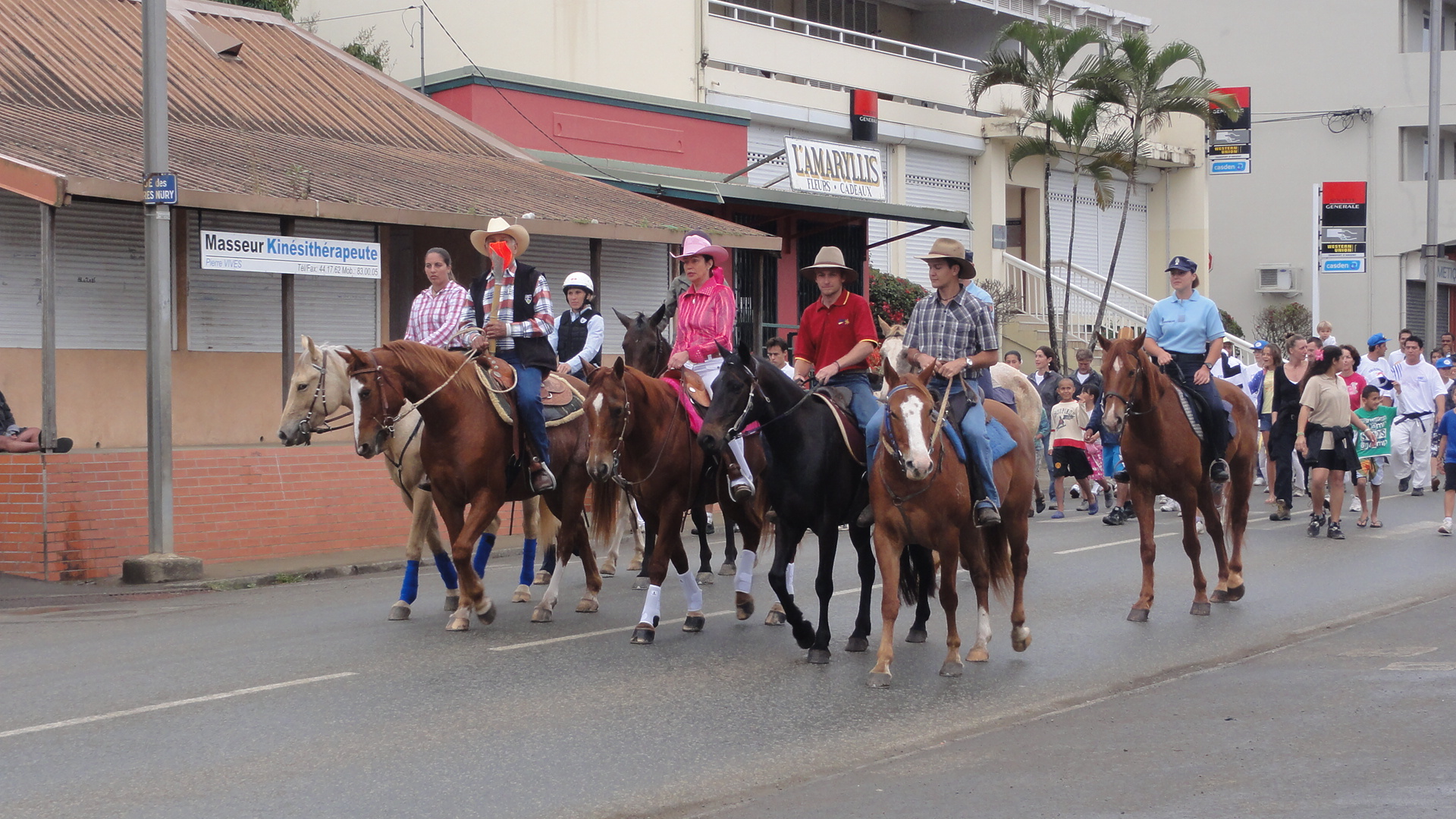
- Caldoche "bushmen" cavaliers carrying the 2011 Pacific Games flame in Bourail

Total population
- 73,199

Regions with significant populations
- New Caledonia (24.1% of total population); Mainly in Nouméa, Bourail, Boulouparis, La Foa, Le Mont-Dore, Farino

Languages
- French

Religion
- Mainly Catholicism, Protestantism

Related ethnic groups
- French people

Caldoche (French pronunciation: [kaldɔʃ]) is the name given to inhabitants of the French overseas collectivity of New Caledonia of European ethnic origin who have settled in New Caledonia since the 19th century. The formal name to refer to this particular population is Calédoniens, short for the very formal Néo-Calédoniens, but this self-appellation technically includes all inhabitants of the New Caledonian archipelago, not just the Caldoche.

Another European demographic within the population of New Caledonia are expatriates from metropolitan France who have arrived recently or live there temporarily as French government civil servants and contract workers. Caldoche emphasise their own distinct identity and position as permanent locals who have lived in New Caledonia for several generations by referring to the temporary French expatriates as métros (short for métropolitains) or as Zoreilles (informally zozos) in local slang.

A majority of the Caldoche are of French descent and have their origins as free colonial or penal settlers, with smaller but significant numbers of Caldoche being of Italian, German, British, Polish, Belgian, and Irish heritage. However, the separate slang term Poken is also used to refer to Anglophones, especially Australians and New Zealanders, but also British people. French is the main language spoken by the Caldoche.

New Caledonia was used as a penal colony from 1854 to 1922 by France. From this period and on, many Europeans (particularly of French and, to some extent, German origin) settled in the territory and they intermingled with Asian and Polynesian settlers. Code de l'indigénat, introduced in 1887, provided the free settler population with an advantageous status over the indigenous Melanesian peoples, known collectively as Kanak. Caldoches settled and gained property on the dry west coast of the main island Grande Terre where the capital Nouméa is also located, pushing the Kanaks onto small reservations in the north and east. With the superior position, they constituted the ruling class of the colony and they were the ones who widened the usage of the word Canaque as a pejorative.

== Etymology ==
There are many theories on the origin of the term "Caldoche". The most widespread story, as told by the collective lexicon 1001 Caledonian Words, attributes the term to local journalist and polemicist Jacqueline Schmidt, who participated actively towards the end of the 1960s in the debate concerning the Billotte laws (in particular the first law, which transferred mining responsibilities in New Caledonia to the state), and signed her articles with the pseudonym "Caldoche", a portmanteau of the prefix "Cald-", referring to her strong feeling of belonging to New Caledonia, where her family settled almost 100 years earlier, and the suffix "-oche", referring to the pejorative term "dirty Boche", having been called that by some of her schoolfriends' parents due to her German heritage (the Schmidts form part of an important German community from the Rhineland, having fled Germany to escape Prussian domination in the 1860s). The owner of the newspaper D1TO, Gerald Rousseau, found the name amusing, and popularised it.

== Origins of the Caldoche people ==
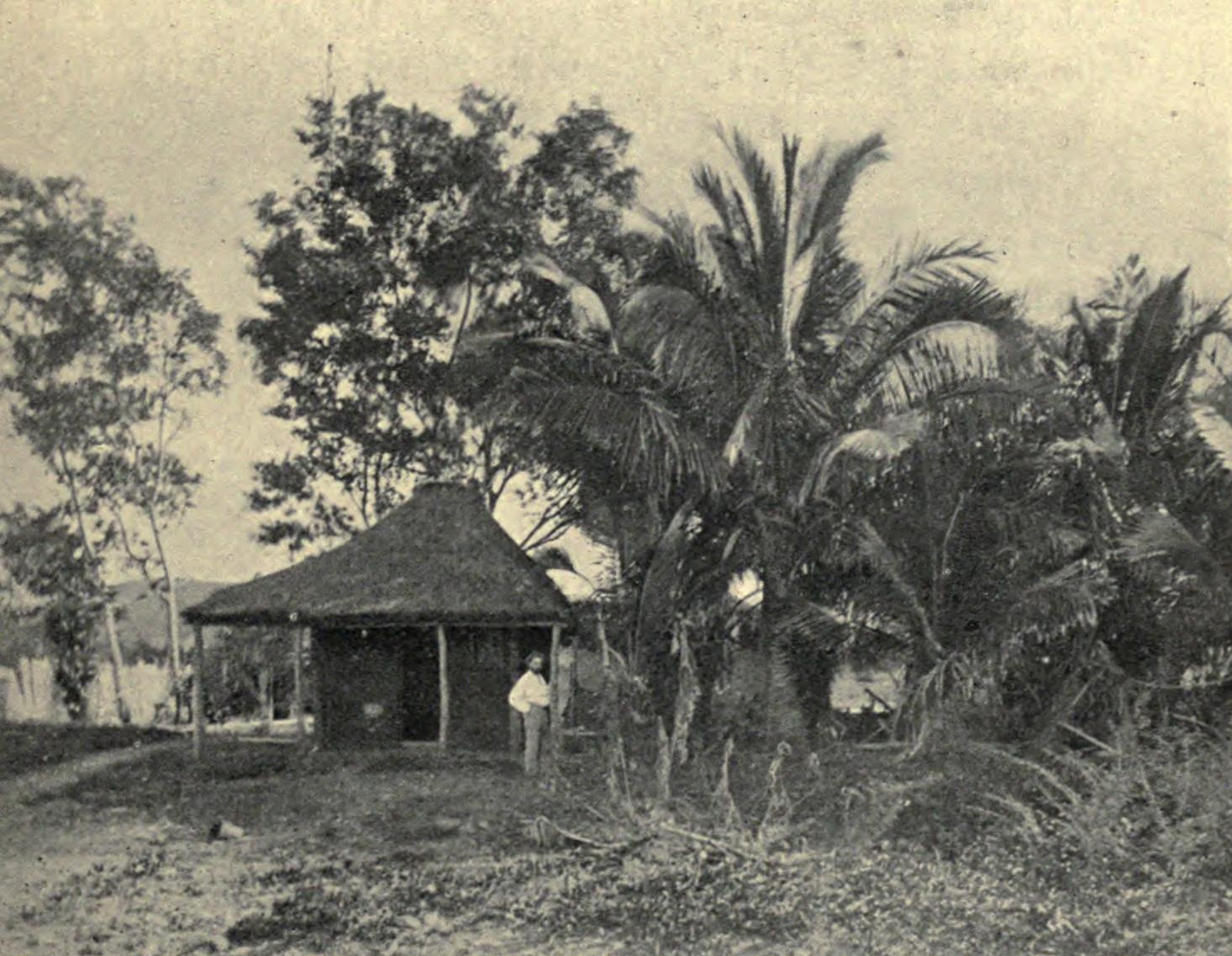
A French settler in front of his home in New Caledonia, circa 1906

=== Free colonists ===
Many colonists either came to New Caledonia through personal initiative or were supported by government programmes and policies to populate New Caledonia. Examples of different waves of settlement include the following:

- 'Paddon' colonists, named after the English merchant James Paddon. In exchange for selling his own land on Île Nou to the French state in 1857 to become part of the infrastructure of the penal colony there, he was given 4000 hectares of farmland in the Karikouié and Katiramona river basins in Païta, on condition that they be populated with at least 22 'males of the white race' together with their families. In the end he received 18 families, including some of Paddon's own nephews who inherited the land after Paddon's death, with the first 5 families, mostly of German origin, arriving in 1859. These settlers mostly cultivated vegetables, with sugarcane cultivation having been abandoned early on. However, difficult conditions forced many of the settlers to move either to the capital or to Australia.
- 'Cheval' colonists, named after the Norman restorator Timothée Cheval, who sought his fortune in New Caledonia in the 1860s and received 1800 hectares by a decree from the governor, on condition that he bring 6 to 8 European settlers, 100 horned livestock, 16 mares and one stallion. These settlers arrived on La Gazelle from Australia in 1862, followed by Cheval's own brother Hippolyte in 1866. As with the Paddon colonists, many subsequently resettled in Nouméa or outside New Caledonia.
- Bourbonnais colonists, made up of Reunionese Creoles who settled in New Caledonia between 1864 and 1880 when the Mascarene Islands entered a period of economic crisis linked with droughts and diseases that attacked the islands' sugar cane crops. Many of these families brought Malbar and Cafre indentured labourers with them and settled on 10,000 hectares of land, used for sugar cane plantation, scattered around the island particularly in Nakety, Canala and Houaïlou on the East coast and Dumbéa, La Foa, La Ouaménie and Koné on the West coast. These plantations were initially a success, and by 1875 at least 454 Reunionese people had arrived to the island. However, locust invasions and the Kanak revolt of 1878 put an end to sugar cane cultivation on the island, and so many of the Reunionese settlers either emigrated back to Réunion or to Metropolitan France or found other careers in the government administration. By 1884 only 173 Reunionese settlers remained.

As well as these planned colonisation projects, many other settlers arrived through their own initiative, for various reasons including poverty at home (such as in the case of Irish and Italian settlers, as well as peasants from mountainous areas of France which were hit hard by the rural crisis of the 19th century), the possibility of acquiring wealth, politics (e.g. republican militants who fled Metropolitan France during the 1851 Coup, or people from Germany and Alsace who refused to live under Prussian rule), or simply overstaying their posts in the civil service or the military.

=== Penal colonists ===
The first 250 prisoners arrived in Port-de-France on board the ship L'Iphigénie. Alain Saussol estimates that 75 different convoys brought around 21,630 prisoners to the penal colony between 1864 and 1897. By 1877, there were 11,110 penal colonists present in New Caledonia, making up around two-thirds of the European population at the time. The last prison colonies were closed in 1922 and 1931.

The prisoner population could be divided into roughly three groups. The 'transported' were convicts sentenced under common law, ranging from eight years up to life, for crimes ranging from physical and sexual assault to murder. These were mostly taken to the prison at Île Nou and worked on the construction of roads and buildings in the colony. Political prisoners, or the 'deported', made up the second group. Many of these participated in the Paris Commune of 1871, 4250 of whom were sent either to Île des Pins or Ducos, including Louise Michel and Henri Rochefort. After they were all granted amnesty in 1880, less than 40 families decided to stay in New Caledonia. Another group of 'deportees' were participants in the Mokrani Revolt of 1871–72 in Algeria, the majority of whom decided to stay in New Caledonia following the granting of amnesty in 1895 and from whom the majority of Algerian New Caledonians in Bourail are descended. Recidivists, or the 'relegated', made up the third group, 3757 of whom were sent from 1885 onwards to New Caledonia, particularly to Île des Pins, Prony or Boulouparis. The 'transported' and 'relegated' stopped being brought to New Caledonia in 1897.

Following being condemned to forced labour, the prisoners had to atone for their crimes by working on penitentiary farms, and once freed were given a portion of the land. Overall around 1300 pieces of land, totalling around 260,000 hectares largely taken from the indigenous Kanak people, were awarded to freed prisoners, particularly around Bourail, La Foa-Farino, Ouégoa and Pouembout, where many of the descendants of the prisoner population remain to this day.

=== Geographical origins ===
The vast majority of Caldoche people are of French origin. Notable French immigration waves include those who fled Alsace and Lorraine following the Franco-Prussian War in 1870, Creole people from Réunion who fled during the sugar crisis of the 1860s and 1870s, merchants and ship owners from Bordeaux and Nantes drawn to the island at the end of the 19th and beginning of the 20th centuries by economic opportunities related to the discovery of nickel reserves, and colonists from the Nord and Picardy regions. Other French people who settled the island included sailors and adventurers from Normandy and Brittany, as well as settlers from the poorest regions of France in what is now the empty diagonal.

However, as previously mentioned, there were also a large number of Paddon and Cheval colonists of British and Irish origin (many of the latter having fled Ireland during the Great Famine) who came to the island via Australia, as well as a sizeable number of Italians, Germans (particularly from the Rhineland), Belgians, Swiss, Spaniards, Croatians and Poles. A significant number of non-Europeans are also grouped under the Caldoche people despite often being of mixed race origin, notably those from Indonesia, Vietnam, Japan, India (via Réunion) and Algeria (the latter particularly concentrated around Bourail)

Since the twentieth century, the Caldoche population has grown to include the families of pieds-noirs (people of French and European heritage who were born and lived in colonial era French Algeria) and their descendants. Some pieds-noirs chose to relocate to New Caledonia over metropolitan France during the 1960s and 1970s in the wake of the Algerian War and subsequent independence of Algeria.

== Geographical distribution ==
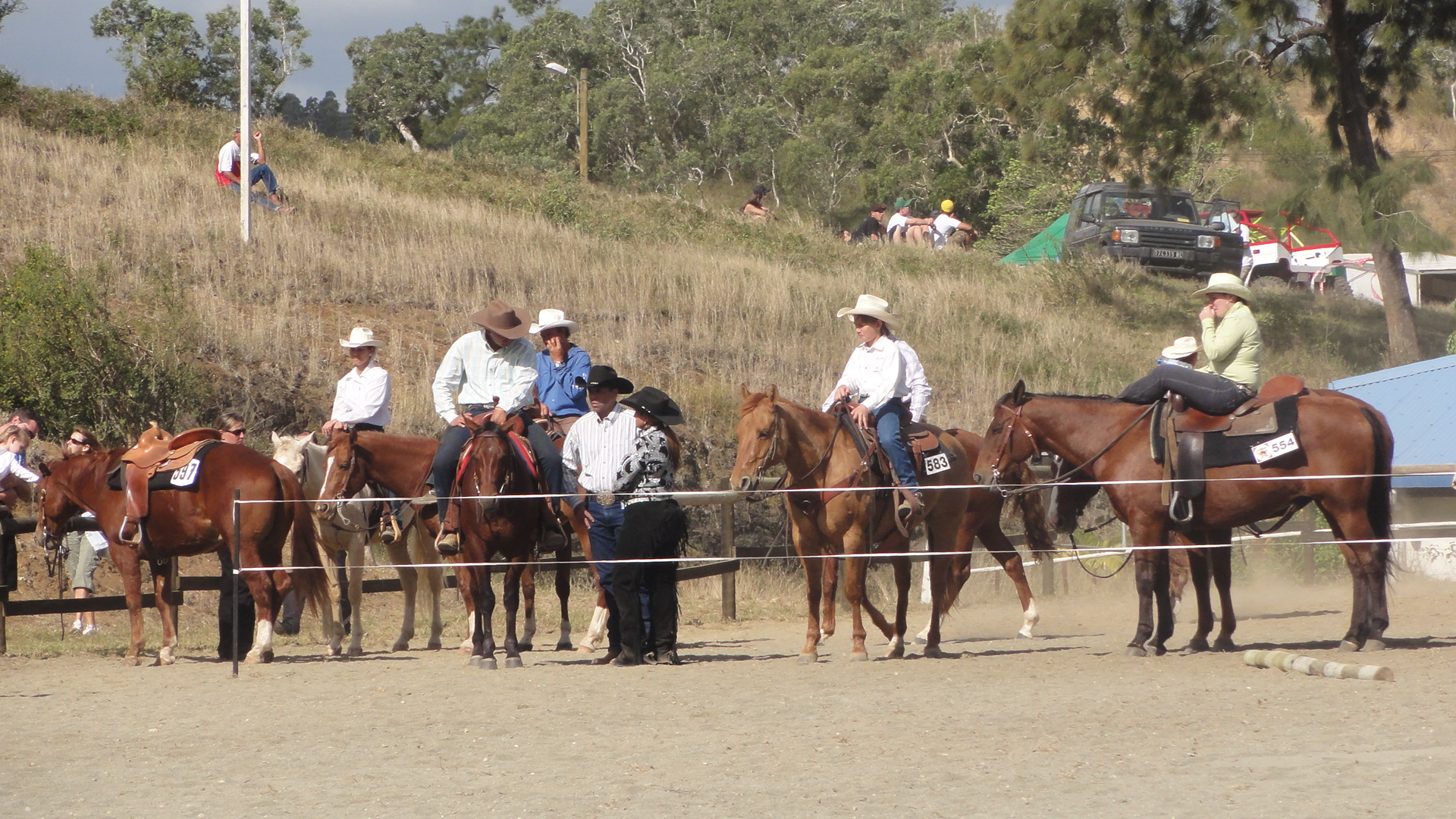
"Broussards" at an agricultural show

A majority of Caldoche people tend to live in the capital Nouméa and the surrounding areas of the South Province. There are also significant Caldoche communities located in Bourail, Boulouparis, La Foa, Le Mont-Dore, with the Caldoche also making up a majority of the population in Farino.

There is usually a division among the Caldoche people between those in Nouméa and more urbanized areas and those in the countryside or 'the Brush' (French: les Broussards). The former are among the most established in the island, arriving in waves of pioneer colonisation in the 1850s to 1870s before the establishment of the penal colony, many of whom having formerly lived in 'the Brush' before either having moved to the capital for economic reasons or witnessing their farms being swallowed up by the expanding urban area of Nouméa itself, and often these people still own rural properties outside of the city. The large number of White people in the capital has led to the city being commonly known as "Nouméa the White", with the combined self-declared European population comprising a plurality of 37.28% (61,034) of the population of Greater Nouméa and 43.4% of the population of Nouméa proper according to the 2009 census, despite more recent waves of immigration of workers from Wallis and Futuna as well as the rural exodus of the indigenous Kanak people from the Brush. Taking into account both the mixed-race metis population and people who put down an alternative ethnic designation on the census (e.g. 'Caledonian'), this proportion increases to 54.19% (88,728) of Greater Nouméa and 58.17% of Nouméa proper, although this figure could also include other populations such as immigrants from Asia or the French Caribbean.

The term Broussard refers to people of European descent in the countryside who live a rural lifestyle, usually raising cattle but also cervids, poultry and rabbits. They are particularly concentrated on the West coast of the main island, from Païta in the South to Koumac in the North, with the proportion decreasing with increasing distance from the capital. Smaller communities also exist on the East coast, notably in Touho and Poindimié as well as in the mining villages of Kouaoua and Thio, where the proportion oscillates between about 7–20% of the population according to the 2009 census. By contrast, they are almost completely absent from the Loyalty Islands, which remains customary property of the indigenous population.

== Politics and society ==
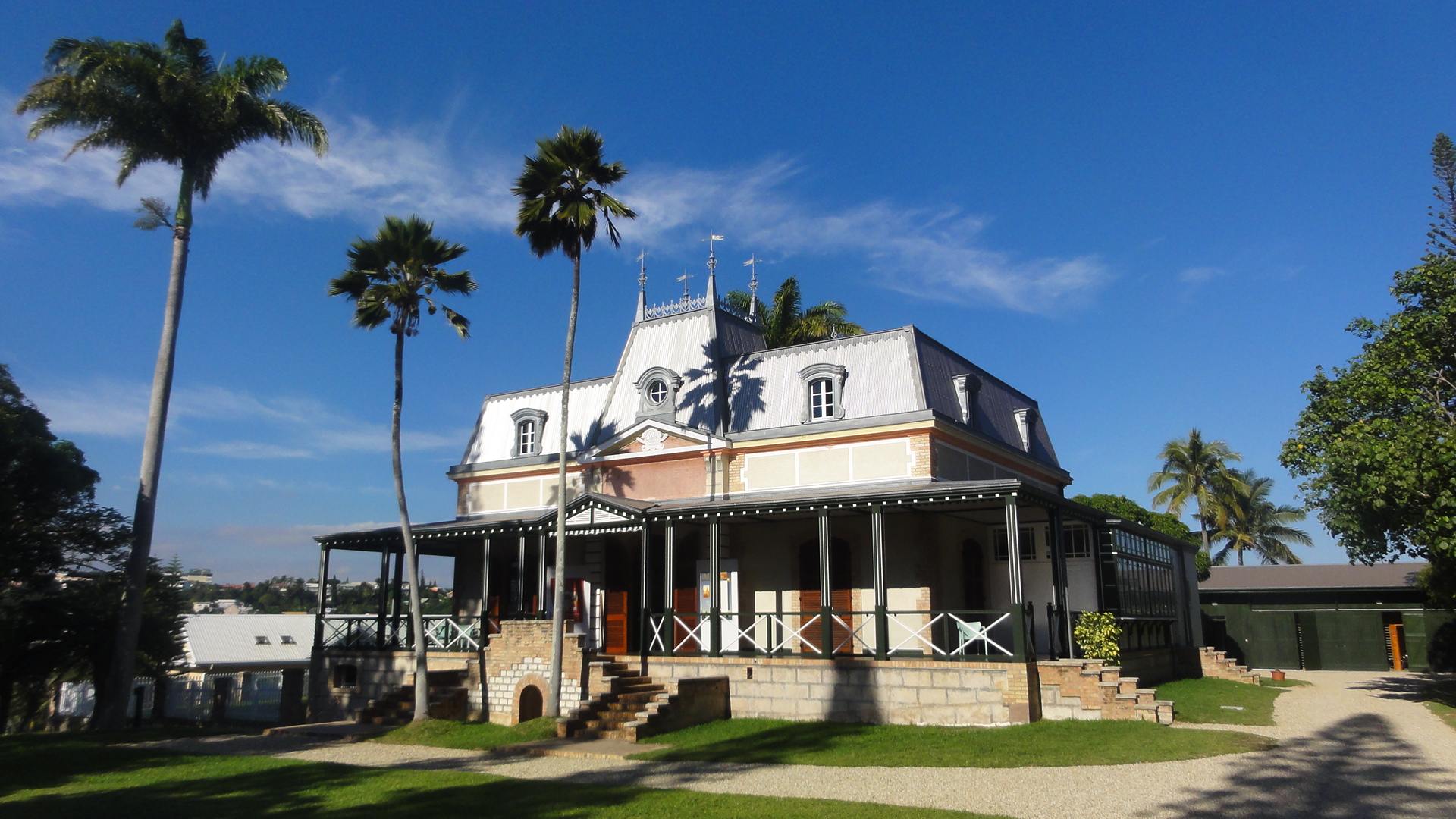
Colonial era house "Château Hagen" in Nouméa

Caldoches tend to be political loyalists and oppose independence from France, instead preferring to maintain New Caledonia as part of overseas France. Traditionally, the Caldoche have supported strongly loyalist parties with the most dominant being The Rally until 2004. In subsequent elections, their support shifted towards Avenir ensemble ("Future Together") and Caledonia Together which have the vision of a shared, multiracial New Caledonia within the framework of remaining part of the French Republic.

It is difficult to gauge the total Caledonian population in New Caledonia today, since the most recent census in 2009 only distinguishes those of European descent (71,721 people, or 29.2% of the total population) from those of mixed origin or 'several communities' (20,398 people or 8.31%), Indonesians (5003 people, 2.5%), Vietnamese people (2822, 1.43%) and those who simply refer to themselves as 'Caledonian' (12,177 people, 4.96%), many of whom consider themselves Caldoche, while the census makes no distinction between people of European descent who consider themselves 'Caldoche' and more recent immigrants from Metropolitan France (the so-called 'Zoreilles').

== Caldoche ==
=== Politics ===
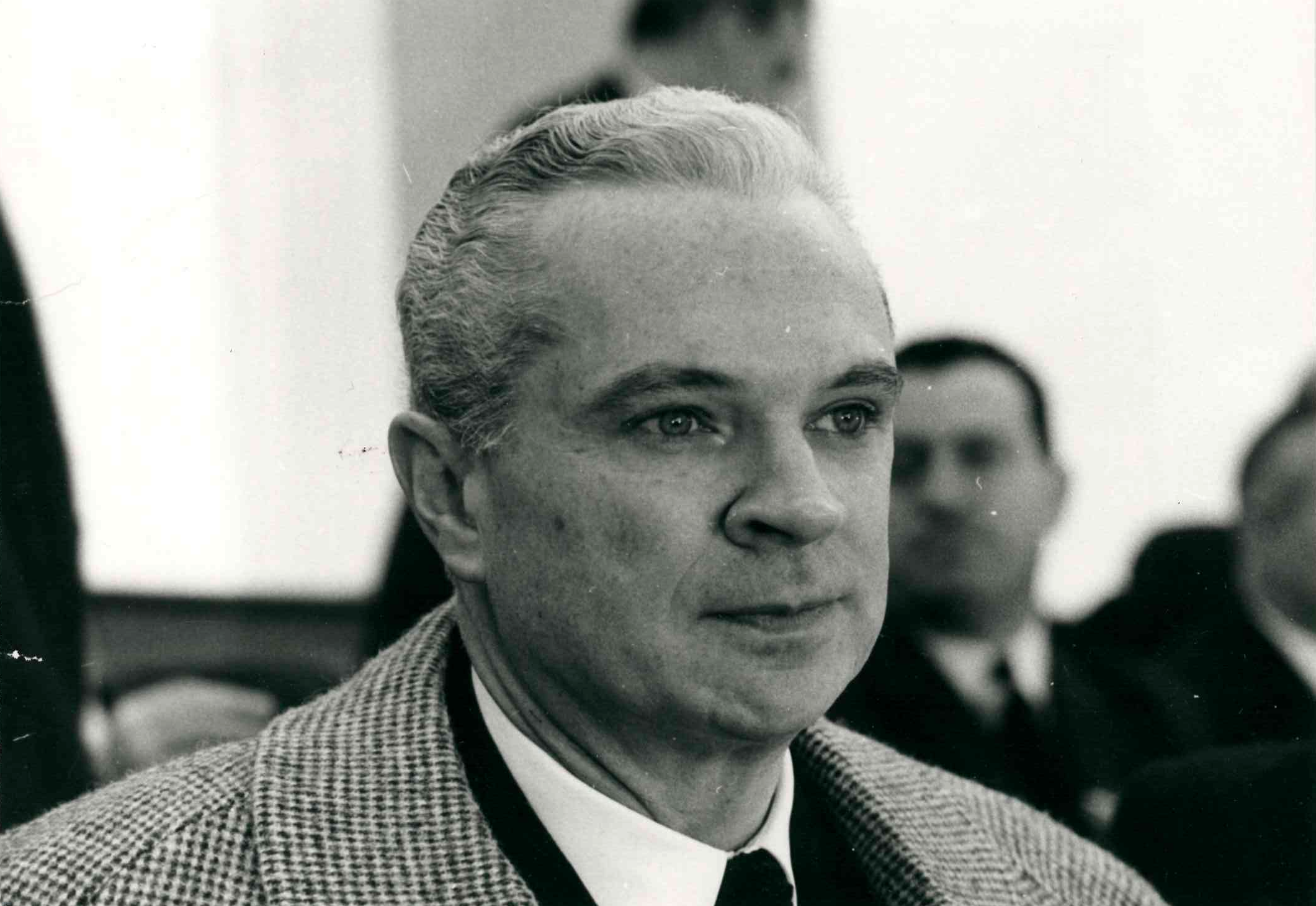
Former French Minister of the Interior Roger Frey born in New Caledonia to a Caldoche family.

- Sonia Backès, politician
- Isabelle Champmoreau, politician
- Lionel Cherrier, Senator
- Philippe Dunoyer, politician
- Roger Frey, French interior minister
- Pierre Frogier, President of the New Caledonia Congress
- Philippe Germain, President of the Government of New Caledonia
- Philippe Gomès, member of the French National Assembly
- Roger Gervolino, politician
- Sonia Lagarde, member of the French National Assembly and mayor of Nouméa
- Jacques Lafleur, politician
- Henri Lafleur, politician
- Roger Laroque, mayor of Nouméa
- Jean Lèques, President of the Government of New Caledonia
- Cynthia Ligeard, President of the Government of New Caledonia
- Harold Martin, President of the Government of New Caledonia
- Nicolas Metzdorf, member of the French National Assembly
- Virginie Ruffenach, politician
- Gaël Yanno, politician
- Pascal Vittori, mayor of Bouloupari

=== Writers ===
- Pierre Maresca, journalist and writer

=== Business ===
- Henri Bonneaud, businessman and political activist
- James Louis Daly, businessman and former soldier

=== Sports ===
- Robert Sassone, professional cyclist
- Laurent Gané, professional cyclist
- Maxime Chazal, tennis player
- Guy Elmour, football manager
- Pierre Fairbank, paralympian
- Christian Cévaër, professional golfer
- Julien Forêt, professional golfer
- Diane Bui Duyet, professional swimmer
- Lara Grangeon, professional swimmer
- Maxime Grousset, professional swimmer
- Charlotte Robin, professional swimmer
- Emma Terebo, professional swimmer
- Patrick Vernay, triathlete

=== Environmentalists ===
- Bruno Van Peteghem, environmentalist

=== Religious figures ===
- Michel-Marie Calvet, archbishop of the Roman Catholic Archdiocese of Nouméa
- Eugène Klein, bishop

== See also ==
- Europeans in Oceania
- French Australians
- French New Zealanders
- Kanak
- Pied-noir
