= Roger Gervolino =

New Caledonian politician (1909–1991)

Roger Gervolino (Nouméa, 17 December 1909 – Nouméa, 24 April 1991) was a New Caledonian politician. He served as a member of the National Assembly of France for three terms, from 21 October 1945 to 10 June 1946, 2 June 1946 to 27 November 1946, and 10 November 1946 to 4 July 1951, sitting as a member of the Democratic and Socialist Union of the Resistance.

In August 1946, he urged the French government to allow New Caledonia to access foreign markets.

== Bibliography ==
- Henningham, Stephen (2014). "Australia's Economic Ambitions in French New Caledonia, 1945–1955". The Journal of Pacific History. 49 (4): 421–439. doi:10.1080/00223344.2014.976915. ISSN 0022-3344. JSTOR 24644648.
