= Aaron Olson =

Canadian-New Zealand basketball player

Personal information
- Born: 11 May 1978 (age 48) Whitehorse, Yukon, Canada
- Listed height: 195 cm (6 ft 5 in)
- Listed weight: 100 kg (220 lb)

Career information
- College: Victoria (1997–1999); Eastern Washington (1999–2001)
- NBA draft: 2001: undrafted
- Playing career: 2001–2007
- Position: Shooting guard

Career history
- 2001: Auckland Stars
- 2002: Harbour Kings
- 2002–2003: Äänekosken Huima
- 2003–2005: Auckland Stars
- 2003–2007: New Zealand Breakers

Career highlights
- 2× NZNBL champion (2004, 2005); NZNBL Final MVP (2004)
Medals
Men's basketball
Representing New Zealand
Commonwealth Games
Silver medal – second place	2006 Melbourne	Team competition

Aaron Duane Olson (born 11 May 1978) is a Canadian-New Zealand former professional basketball player who played the majority of his career in New Zealand.

== Early life and career ==
Born in Whitehorse, Yukon, Canada to a New Zealand mother and a Canadian father, Olson moved back and forth between the two countries as a youth, spending time living in Nelson and the Bay of Islands region. Olson attended college at the University of Victoria in Canada before switching to Eastern Washington University in 1999. He played in 46 games for the Eastern Washington Eagles over two seasons, averaging 11.8 points, 2.7 rebounds and 2.1 assists per game.

== Professional career ==
In 2001, Olson returned to New Zealand and joined the Auckland Stars of the National Basketball League. After a one-season stint with the Harbour Kings in 2002, Olson returned to the Stars in 2003 and continued playing for them until 2005, helping the club win back-to-back championships in 2004 and 2005. He also spent the 2002–03 season playing in Finland for Äänekosken Huima.

Between 2003 and 2007, Olson played for the New Zealand Breakers in the Australian National Basketball League. In 130 games for the Breakers over four seasons, he averaged 13.8 points, 3.0 rebounds and 2.2 assists per game.

In May 2007, Olson announced his retirement from professional basketball.

== National team career ==
Known for his outside shooting touch and gritty defence, Olson debuted for the Tall Blacks against the Czech Republic in 2003, was ruled ineligible to face Australia in that year's Oceania Championships, but was cleared to represent New Zealand at the 2004 Olympics and subsequently the 2006 Melbourne Commonwealth Games.
