= University of Adelaide Press =

- Parent company: University of Adelaide
- Founded: 2009
- Defunct: December 2018
- Country of origin: Australia
- Headquarters location: Adelaide, South Australia
- Publication types: Books, academic journals
- Official website: www.adelaide.edu.au/press

The University of Adelaide Press (UAP) was the book publishing arm of The University of Adelaide. It published peer-reviewed scholarship in print and open access ebooks. Launched by author and Nobel Prize winner J. M. Coetzee it operated from 2009 to 2018, with the final work published in February 2019.

== History ==
In the 1920s, around the time the University of Melbourne established Australia's first university press, the University of Adelaide began publishing titles under various imprints. In partnership with printers, G Hassell & Co, the university produced leather-bound hand-tooled collectible works modeled on the output of Oxford University Press.

The Barr Smith Press imprint (named after the university's main library) was established in 1991, and published the correspondence of Joanna Elder and Robert Barr Smith in 1996. From 2005 to 2007, four books were published with the renamed 'University of Adelaide Barr Smith Press' under the directorship of John Emerson, who also ran the press under its UAP moniker from 2009.

== Activities ==
The press was divided into two separate imprints, the 'University of Adelaide Press' and the 'Barr Smith Press'. The University of Adelaide Press published peer-reviewed scholarship. The Barr Smith Press published works of interest about the history and activities of The University of Adelaide, including memoirs, biographies and histories of its clubs and institutions.

As an open access publisher funded by the university, UAP titles were made available as free ebooks upon publication. As of 2015, more than half a million ebooks had been downloaded. UAP published around 80 titles in total over the 10 years of its operation, and they remain available as free PDFs on its webpage and for purchase in print form.
