= 2014 New Caledonian legislative election =

- 11 May 2014
- All 54 seats in the Congress; 28 seats needed for a majority
Party	Leader	Vote %	Seats	+/–
Ensemble	Philippe Gomès	26.05	15	+5
Front for Unity	Cynthia Ligeard	12.97	7	−11
UC	Daniel Goa	12.92	9	+1
UCF	Sonia Backès	11.91	6	+4
CNNA	Roch Wamytan	11.67	6	+3
UNI	Louis Mapou	10.38	7	+1
PT	Louis Kotra Uregei	3.49	1	−3
EPN	Francis Euriboa	2.08	1	
LKS	Basile Citré	1.49	1	0
UPCLL	Jacques Lalié	1.49	1	
This lists parties that won seats. See the complete results below.
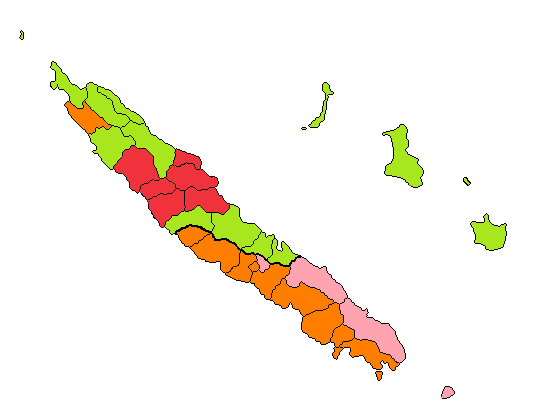
Results by province.

Legislative elections were held in New Caledonia on 11 May 2014. The result was a victory for the three anti-independence parties (Caledonia Together, Front for Unity and Union for Caledonia in France), which together won 29 of the 54 seats (48.85% of the votes, 53.7% of the seats) in the Congress of New Caledonia.

== Electoral system ==
Voters elected 87 members to the assemblies of the three provinces of New Caledonia. In turn, 54 also become members of the Congress. Voting was restricted to people on the Special Roll, which excluded people who moved to New Caledonia after 1988.

A total of 17 parties registered to contest the elections.

== Campaign ==
The main issue at stake in the elections was independence from France. The elected Congress would be responsible for taking decisions on moving towards independence, as agreed in the Nouméa Accord, and an independence referendum will be held during the term of this Congress if there is a three-fifths majority in favour of holding one. However, in the lead up to the elections, the pro-independence Kanak and Socialist National Liberation Front claimed that around 6,700 people on the Special Roll had moved to New Caledonia after 1988, and that 2,000 people who should have been on the Special Roll and were eligible to vote in the Territorial elections were not, the two figures equating to around 7% of registered voters. In response, anti-independence groups claimed that 4,000 Kanaks should be removed from the electoral roll, and that taking the issue to court would threaten a return to violence.

A television debate was planned to discuss the electoral roll issue, but was cancelled at the last minute. The United Nations sent a delegation to the territory in March 2014 to look into the controversy around the electoral lists, and to ensure that the Accords were upheld. Although the French government approved the UN delegation, the anti-independence Union for New Caledonia within France and Caledonia Together opposed their presence.

== Results ==
Party	Votes	%	Seats			
Party	Votes	%	Provincial assemblies	+/–	Congress	+/–
Caledonia Together	27,424	26.05	19	+7	15	+5
Front for Unity (LR–AE–LMD)	13,649	12.97	9	–14	7	–11
Caledonian Union	13,602	12.92	15	+1	9	+1
Union for Caledonia in France (MPC–RPC–MRC)	12,539	11.91	8	+6	6	+4
Build Our Rainbow Nation (UC–Palika–UPM–RDO–DUS)	12,289	11.67	7	+3	6	+3
National Union for Independence	10,929	10.38	11	+1	7	+1
Labour Party	3,678	3.49	2	–5	1	–3
National Front	2,706	2.57	0	–	0	–
North Province Agreement (Note: In coalition with the Front for Unity)	2,191	2.08	1	–	1	–
Convergence Country	2,190	2.08	0	–	0	–
Kanak Socialist Liberation	1,566	1.49	2	–	1	–
Union for Building the Loyalty Islands	1,564	1.49	2	1	1	–
The Other Voice	939	0.89	0	–	0	–
Total	105,266	100.00	76	0	54	0
Valid votes	105,266	98.68				
Invalid/blank votes	1,410	1.32				
Total votes	106,676	100.00				
Registered voters/turnout	152,457	69.97				
Source: New Caledonia Government

=== By bloc ===
Graph of the party split among 54 seats.
Party	Votes	%	Seats			
Party	Votes	%	Provincial assemblies	+/–	Congress	+/–
Loyalists; CE, FPU, UCF, FN, EPN, CP, LV	61,638	58.55	37	–1	29	–2
Separatists; UC, CNNA, UNI, PT, LKS, UCL	43,628	41.45	39	+1	25	+2
Total	105,266	100.00	76	0	54	0
Valid votes	105,266	98.68				
Invalid/blank votes	1,410	1.32				
Total votes	106,676	100.00				
Registered voters/turnout	152,457	69.97				
