= Outline of New Caledonia =

Overview of and topical guide to New Caledonia

Flag of the Kanak and Socialist National Liberation Front political party, used by New Caledonia alongside the flag of France.

Coat of arms of New Caledonia

Flag of France

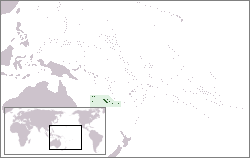
The location of New Caledonia

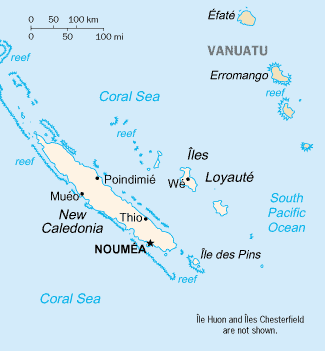
An enlargeable map of New Caledonia

The following outline is provided as an overview of and topical guide to New Caledonia:

New Caledonia – "sui generis collectivity" (in practice an overseas territory) of France, comprising a main island (Grande Terre), the Loyalty Islands, and several smaller islands. It is located in the region of Melanesia in the southwest Pacific. At about half the size of Taiwan, it has a land area of 18,575.5 square kilometres (7,172 sq mi). The population was 244,600 inhabitants as of January 2008 official estimates. The capital and largest city of the territory is Nouméa. The currency is the CFP franc.

Since 1986 the United Nations Committee on Decolonization has included New Caledonia on the United Nations list of non-self-governing territories. New Caledonia decided to remain within the French Republic after three referendums held in 2018, 2020, and 2021. The future status of New Caledonia (i.e. possibility of becoming an independent state) is not settled, however.

Its capital Nouméa is the seat of the regional organization the Secretariat of the Pacific Community (formerly the South Pacific Commission).

== General reference ==
- Common English country name: New Caledonia
- Official English country name: New Caledonia
- Common endonym(s): List of countries and capitals in native languages
- Official endonym(s): List of official endonyms of present-day nations and states
- Adjectival(s): New Caledonian
- Demonym(s):
- Etymology: Name of New Caledonia
- ISO country codes: NC, NCL, 540
- ISO region codes: See ISO 3166-2:NC
- Internet country code top-level domain: .nc

== Geography of New Caledonia ==
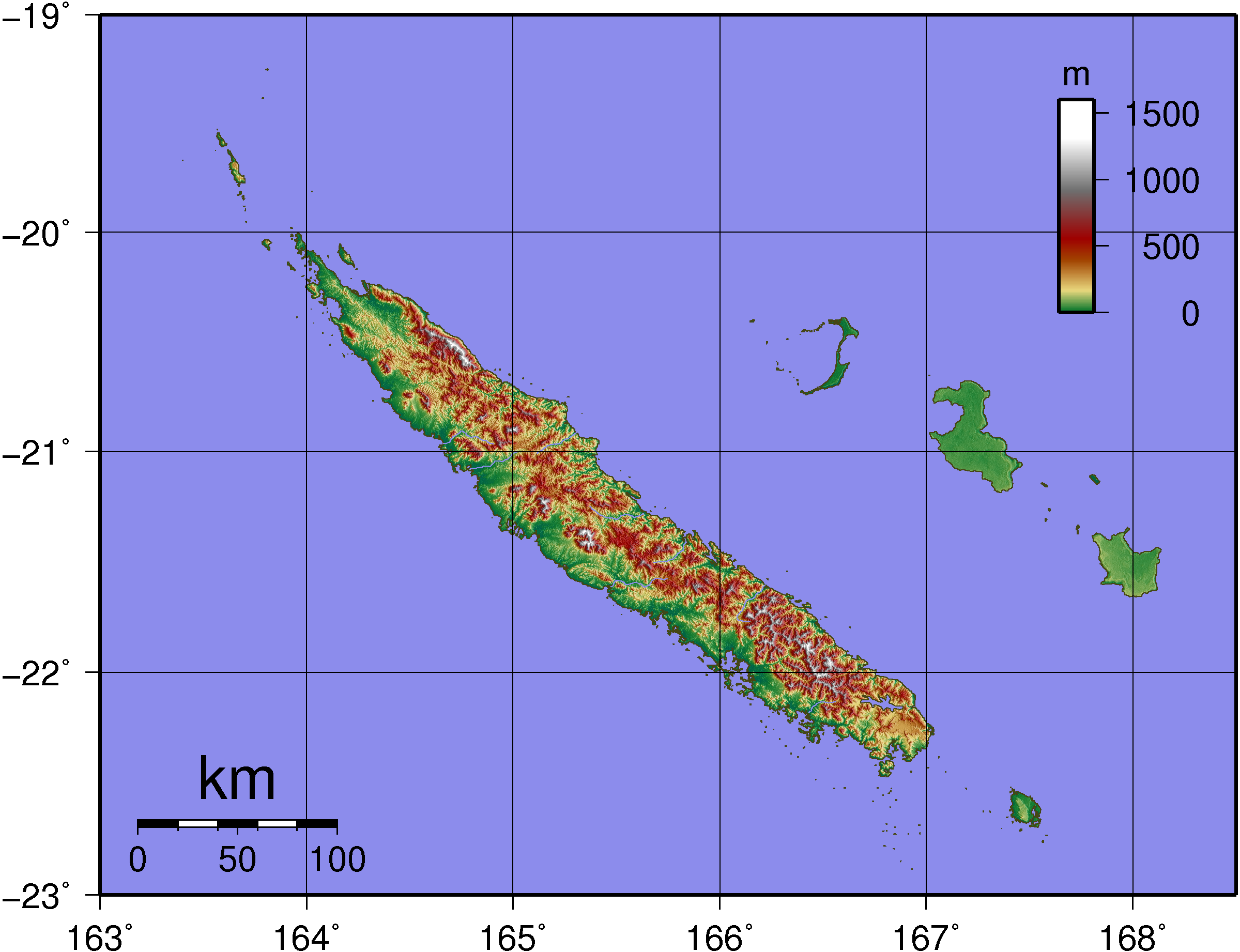
An enlargeable topographic map of New Caledonia

Geography of New Caledonia

- New Caledonia is: a "sui generis collectivity" (in practice an overseas territory) of France
- Location:
  - Southern Hemisphere and Eastern Hemisphere
    - Pacific Ocean
      - West Pacific
        - South Pacific Ocean
          - Oceania
            - Melanesia
  - Time zone: UTC+11
  - Extreme points of New Caledonia
    - High: Mont Panie 1,628 m (5,341 ft)
    - Low: Coral Sea 0 m
  - Land boundaries: none
  - Coastline: South Pacific Ocean 2,254 km
- Population of New Caledonia: 244,600 (January 1, 2008) - —th most populous country
- Area of New Caledonia: 18,575 km^{2}
- Atlas of New Caledonia

=== Environment of New Caledonia ===
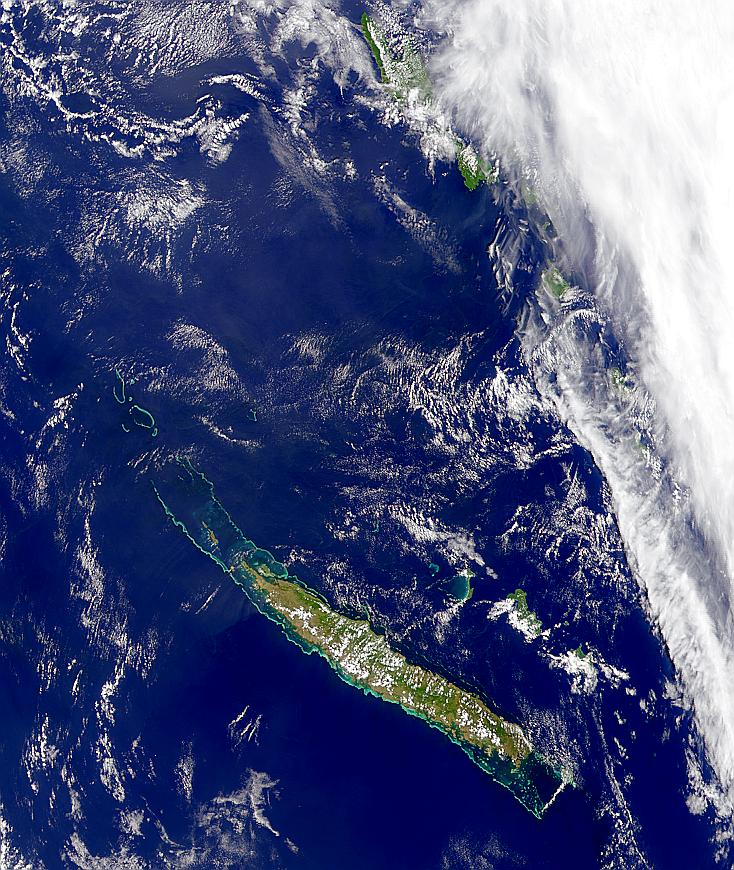
An enlargeable satellite image of New Caledonia

- Tropical Climate
- Renewable energy in New Caledonia
- Geology of New Caledonia
- Protected areas of New Caledonia
  - Biosphere reserves in New Caledonia
  - National parks of New Caledonia
- Wildlife of New Caledonia
  - Fauna of New Caledonia
    - Birds of New Caledonia
    - Mammals of New Caledonia

==== Natural geographic features of New Caledonia ====
- Fjords of New Caledonia
- Glaciers of New Caledonia
- Islands of New Caledonia
- Lakes of New Caledonia
- Mountains of New Caledonia
  - Volcanoes in New Caledonia
- Rivers of New Caledonia
  - Waterfalls of New Caledonia
- Valleys of New Caledonia
- World Heritage Sites in New Caledonia

==== Administrative divisions of New Caledonia ====
Administrative divisions of New Caledonia

- Provinces of New Caledonia
  - Districts of New Caledonia
    - Municipalities of New Caledonia

===== Municipalities of New Caledonia =====
- Capital of New Caledonia: Nouméa
- Cities of New Caledonia

=== Demography of New Caledonia ===
Demographics of New Caledonia

== Government and politics of New Caledonia ==
Politics of New Caledonia

- Form of government:
- Capital of New Caledonia: Nouméa
- Elections in New Caledonia
- Political parties in New Caledonia

=== Branches of the government of New Caledonia ===
Government of New Caledonia

==== Executive branch of the government of New Caledonia ====
- Head of state: President of New Caledonia,
- Head of government: Prime Minister of New Caledonia,
- Cabinet of New Caledonia

==== Legislative branch of the government of New Caledonia ====
- Parliament of New Caledonia (bicameral)
  - Upper house: Senate of New Caledonia
  - Lower house: House of Commons of New Caledonia

==== Judicial branch of the government of New Caledonia ====
- Supreme Court of New Caledonia

=== Foreign relations of New Caledonia ===
Foreign relations of New Caledonia

- Diplomatic missions in New Caledonia
- Diplomatic missions of New Caledonia
- France-New Caledonia relations

==== International organization membership ====
New Caledonia is a member of:

- International Trade Union Confederation (ITUC)
- Pacific Islands Forum (PIF) (associate member)
- Secretariat of the Pacific Community (SPC)
- Universal Postal Union (UPU)
- World Federation of Trade Unions (WFTU)
- World Meteorological Organization (WMO)

=== Military of New Caledonia ===
Military of New Caledonia

- Command
  - Commander-in-chief: Brigadier General Martial de Braquilanges
    - Ministry of Defence of New Caledonia
- Forces
  - Army of New Caledonia
  - Navy of New Caledonia
  - Air Force of New Caledonia
  - Special forces of New Caledonia
- Military history of New Caledonia
- Military ranks of New Caledonia

== History of New Caledonia ==
History of New Caledonia

== Culture of New Caledonia ==
Culture of New Caledonia

- Architecture of New Caledonia
- Cuisine of New Caledonia
- Festivals in New Caledonia
- Languages of New Caledonia
- Media in New Caledonia
- National symbols of New Caledonia
  - Coat of arms of New Caledonia
  - Flag of New Caledonia
  - National Anthem of New Caledonia
- People of New Caledonia
- Public holidays in New Caledonia
- Records of New Caledonia
- Religion in New Caledonia
  - Christianity in New Caledonia
  - Islam in New Caledonia
  - Judaism in New Caledonia
  - Sikhism in New Caledonia
- World Heritage Sites in New Caledonia

=== Art in New Caledonia ===
- Art in New Caledonia
- Cinema of New Caledonia
- Literature of New Caledonia
- Music of New Caledonia
- Television in New Caledonia
- Theatre in New Caledonia
- Oceanian Countries

== Economy and infrastructure of New Caledonia ==
Economy of New Caledonia

- Economic rank, by nominal GDP (2007): 147th (one hundred and forty seventh)
- Agriculture in New Caledonia
- Banking in New Caledonia
  - National Bank of New Caledonia
- Communications in New Caledonia
  - Internet in New Caledonia
- Companies of New Caledonia
- Currency of New Caledonia: Franc
  - ISO 4217: XPF
- Energy in New Caledonia
  - Energy policy of New Caledonia
  - Oil industry in New Caledonia
- Mining in New Caledonia
- Tourism in New Caledonia
- Transport in New Caledonia
- New Caledonia Stock Exchange

== Education in New Caledonia ==
Education in New Caledonia

== Infrastructure of New Caledonia ==
- Health care in New Caledonia
- Transportation in New Caledonia
  - Airports in New Caledonia
  - Rail transport in New Caledonia
  - Roads in New Caledonia
- Water supply and sanitation in New Caledonia

== See also ==
New Caledonia

- Index of New Caledonia-related articles
- List of international rankings
- List of New Caledonia-related topics
- Outline of France
- Outline of geography
- Outline of Oceania
