= Philippe Gomès =

New Caledonian politician

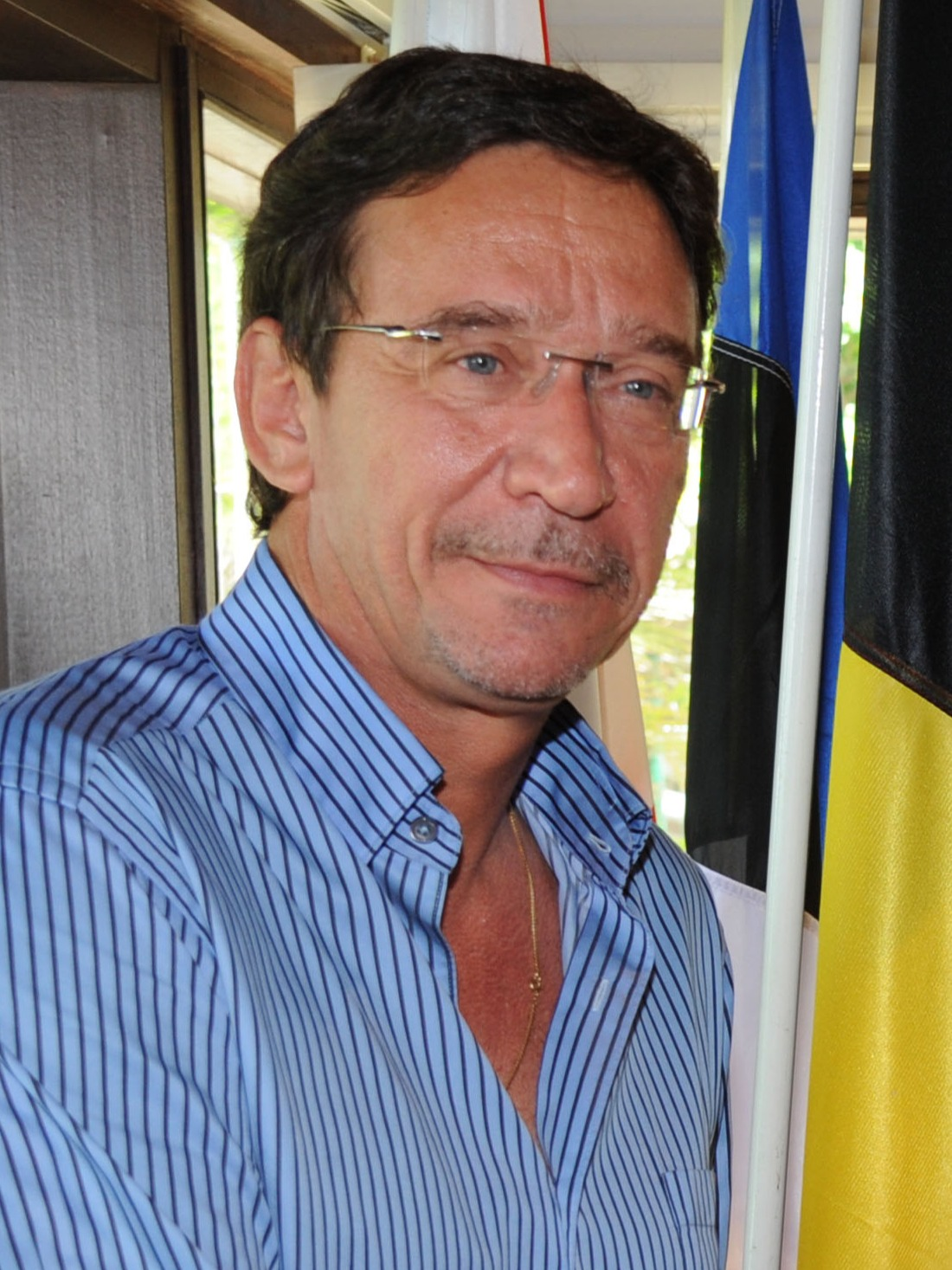
- Gomès in 2011

Member of the National Assembly for New Caledonia's 2nd constituency
- In office 11 October 2008 – 18 June 2022
- Preceded by: Pierre Frogier
- Succeeded by: Nicolas Metzdorf

President of Caledonia Together
- Incumbent
- Assumed office 11 October 2008

President of the Government of New Caledonia
- In office 5 June 2009 – 11 March 2011
- Vice President: Pierre Ngaiohni
- Preceded by: Harold Martin
- Succeeded by: Harold Martin

President of the Assembly of South Province
- In office 14 May 2004 – 10 May 2009
- Preceded by: Jacques Lafleur
- Succeeded by: Pierre Frogier

Mayor of La Foa
- In office 17 March 1989 – 9 March 2008
- Preceded by: Félix Basquin
- Succeeded by: Corine Voisin

Personal details
- Born: 27 October 1958 (age 67) Algiers, Algeria
- Party: Caledonia Together

Philippe Gomès (born 27 October 1958) is a New Caledonian politician and, from 5 June 2009 to 11 March 2011, President of the Government of New Caledonia, an overseas territory of France in the Pacific Ocean. He served as a member of the National Assembly from 2008 until 2022.

== Biography ==
Gomès was born in Algiers, Algeria. He was appointed by the Congress of New Caledonia after the provincial election held on 10 May 2009. He is backed by a wide coalition of the four main loyalists (i.e. anti-independence) parties that control 36 of the 54 seats in the Congress, now political allies after having fought each other during the campaign : The Rally–UMP, Caledonia Together (Gomès' party), Future Together and Movement for Diversity. In the Government, 7 of the 11 members come from those pro-France parties.

A former member of RPCR (older name of The Rally–UMP and historical anti-independence party in New Caledonia), Gomès left it in 2004 to found with others dissidents (like Marie-Noëlle Thémereau or Harold Martin) the Future Together (Avenir ensemble) party that defeated RPCR in the provincial election on 9 May 2004. Then, Philippe Gomès became president of the South Province, by far the most economically developed and most urbanized part of New Caledonia. After a conflict between him and some members of the party, including Harold Martin or Didier Leroux, he entered again in dissent, leaving Future Together to create his own movement called Caledonia Together (Calédonie ensemble).

He was also mayor of La Foa, a rural commune on the West Coast of Grande Terre (the main island of the archipelago), from 1989 to 2008. In this village, he notably created an annual film festival, the first and the only one in New Caledonia. Its first president was the French film director Jean-Pierre Jeunet, and among his successors have included Claude Pinoteau, Jane Campion, Claude Brasseur or Patrice Leconte.

Since March 2011, he served in the New Caledonia Government, as minister for Transfers of civil security, civil and commercial rules, and of civil status.

On 17 June 2012, he was elected as member of the National Assembly of France in the 2nd constituency of New Caledonia. He joined the Union of Democrats and Independents group in the National Assembly, chaired by former minister Jean-Louis Borloo.

In the 2022 legislative election, Gomes lost his seat in the National Assembly for New Caledonia's 2nd constituency to Nicolas Metzdorf.
