= Déwé Gorodey =

New Caledonian politician (1949–2022)

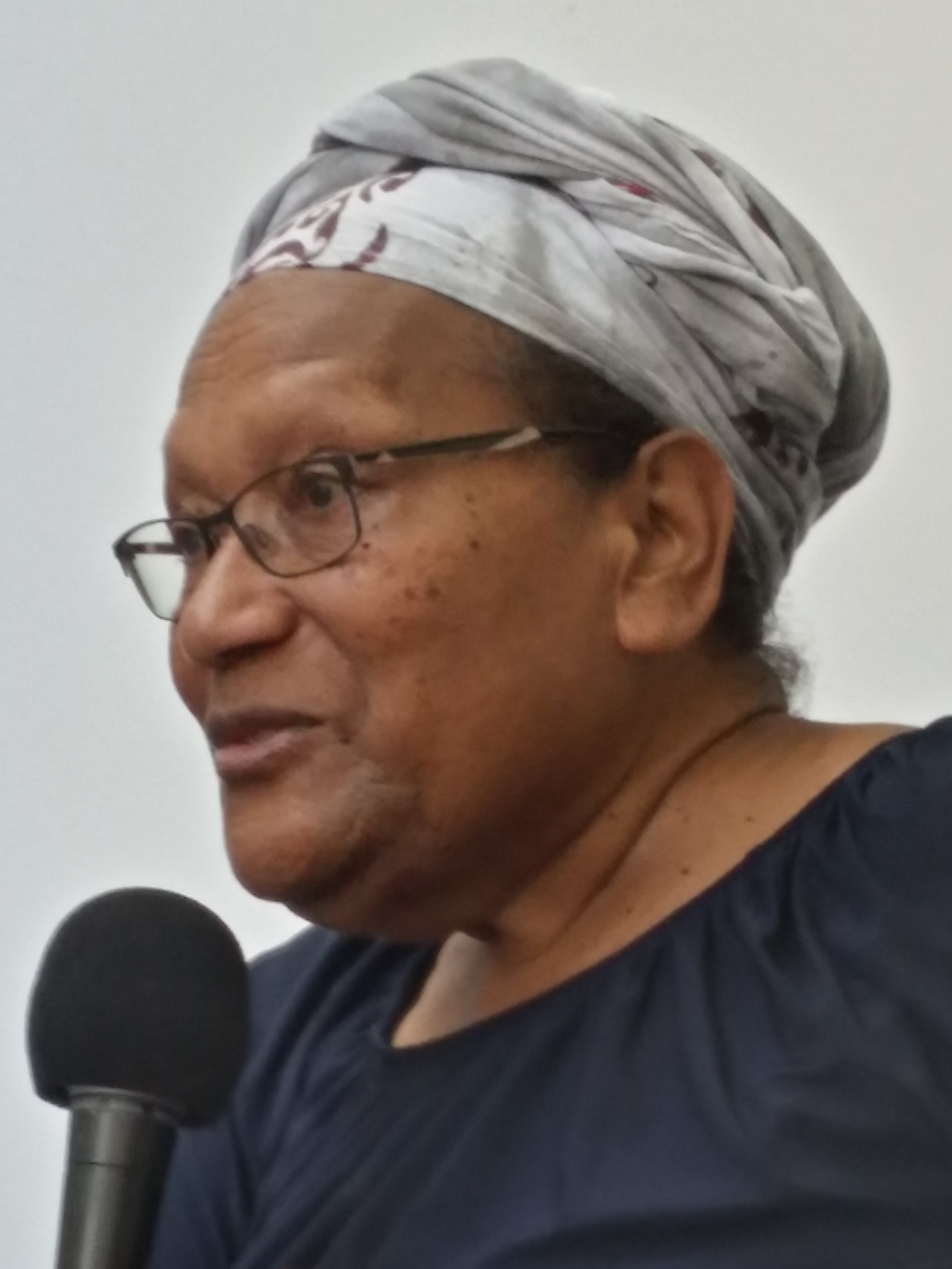
- Gorodey in 2016

Member of the Government of New Caledonia
- In office 2 June 1999 – 14 August 2022

Vice President of the Government of New Caledonia
- In office 5 April 2001 – 7 August 2007
- Preceded by: Léopold Jorédié
- Succeeded by: Annie Beustes
- In office 21 August 2007 – 5 June 2009
- Preceded by: Annie Beustes
- Succeeded by: Pierre Ngaiohni

Personal details
- Born: 1 June 1949 Ponérihouen, New Caledonia, France
- Died: 14 August 2022 (aged 73)
- Occupation: Teacher, writer, feminist, politician

Déwé Gorodey (Note: or Déwé Gorodé) (1 June 1949 – 14 August 2022) was a New Caledonian teacher, writer, feminist and politician. She was active in agitating for independence from France in the 1970s. She published poetry, short stories and novels. From 1999, she was a member of the New Caledonian government, representing the pro-independence Kanak and Socialist National Liberation Front. From April 2001 to June 2009, she served almost continuously as Vice President of the Government of New Caledonia.

== Early years ==
Gorodey was born on 1 June 1949 in Ponérihouen, New Caledonia. Her family belonged to the Pwârâïriwâ tribe of Kanak people. Her home village is on the east coast of New Caledonia, at the mouth of the Ponérihouen River. She received her primary education in the Houaïlou region, then attended the Lapérouse High School in Nouméa where she passed her baccalaureate in philosophy. She went on to study at the Paul Valéry University, Montpellier III, where she obtained a BA in modern literature. She was the first Kanak woman to ever receive a college education. She returned to New Caledonia in 1974 and obtained a job teaching French at a Catholic school in the Nouméa suburbs. She married and has three children.

== Independence activist ==
In 1974, Gorodey joined the Foulards rouges (Red Scarf) movement, which had been created in 1969, and served as president for some time. She was then one of the founders of the Groupe 1878, which was named after the Kanak revolt of 1878. The Foulards Rouges and Groupe 1878 were both collectives of intellectuals who challenged the French colonial presence and practices related to land rights and discrimination. Some members, such as Nidoïsh Naisseline, had been involved in the May 1968 events in France, while others including Gorodey would not visit Europe until later. Both groups were created by small numbers of well-educated Kanak people and appealed to young men who had left the reservations to work in the nickel industry during the short-lived boom but had become unemployed when it ended. In 1976, she helped found the Party of Kanak Liberation (Palika). She was in charge of external relations for PALIKA and in this role travelled in the Pacific, Australia, Algeria, Canada, Mexico City and the United Nations. She was imprisoned three times between 1974 and 1977 for her political activities.

Gorodé was one of the founders of the feminist Groupe de femmes kanak exploitées en lutte (GFKEL). In 1974, she was arrested expressing her opposition to the celebration of the colonisation of New Caledonia on 24 September 1853. In prison, she developed the concept of GFKEL with other women, including Susanna Ounei. The organization was intended to ensure equal treatment of women within the independence movement. In 1984, GFKEL was one of the founding organizations of the Kanak and Socialist National Liberation Front (FLNKS: Front de Libération Nationale Kanak et Socialiste).

== Teacher and author ==
In 1983, Gorodey was a French teacher at the Do-Néva Protestant College in Houaïlou. In 1984, after the death of ten Kanak militants in Hienghène, she left this college and joined the newly created Kanak People's School (EPK) in Ponérihouen, where she taught the local Paicî language until 1988. She had started to write poetry in 1970 but did not publish for many years. In 1985, she published Sous les Ashes des conques, her first volume of poetry, followed over the years by other novels and collections of poetry. Her works described the traditional culture of Melanesia and the present political issues. Gorodey is now one of the most widely-recognised Melanesian cultural figures.

In 1992, Gorodé participated in a women's mission in Mali, led by Marie-Claude Tjibaou. She worked for the Kanak Culture Development Agency from 1994 to 1995 during preparations for the Tjibaou Cultural Center. She resumed teaching Paicî again in Houaïlou and Poindimié from 1996 to 1997. Between 1999 and 2001 she gave courses at the University of New Caledonia in Nouméa on the history of Pacific literature and contemporary Melanesian literature. In 2002 she participated in the Salon du livre insulaire on the island of Ushant, Brittany. On 9 November 2009, at a ceremony at the High Commission, she was made a Chevalier des Arts et des lettres.

== Politician ==
In 1999 Gorodey and Léonie Tidjite Varnier were the first women to be elected to Congress, representing the North Province. In the government of Jean Lèques she was responsible for Culture, Youth and Sports. After the March 2001 provincial elections President Lèques resigned. On 3 April 2001, congress elected Pierre Frogier of the Rally for Caledonia in the Republic (RPCR: Rassemblement pour une Calédonie dans la République) to replace him. Gorodey, a representative of the FLNKS, became Vice President of the Government of New Caledonia. She retained the Culture, Youth and Sports portfolio from April 2001 to June 2004. Reelected vice president in June 2004 she was made responsible for Culture, Status of Women and Citizenship.

From 2004 to 2007 Marie-Noëlle Thémereau, who represented the loyalist L'Avenir Ensemble, was president of congress, and Gorodey, who represented the FLNKS, was vice president. In the 2007 elections there was a swing towards stronger support for remaining part of France. Harold Martin, president of Avenir Ensemble, became president of congress. Gorodey continued as vice president, and the political mood continued to be one of accommodation between the different parties, but the RPCR had regained some of its past influence. On 5 June 2009, Harold Martin was again elected president of congress. After some delay, on 15 June 2009 Pierre Ngaiohni of the FLNKS was elected vice president.

== Late life and death ==
Gorodey suffered from cancer for a number of years, and at the age of 73, she died in a hospital in Poindimié.

== Works ==
- Déwé Gorodey (1985). Sous les cendres des conques (poems). Noumea: Edipop.
- Déwé Gorodey (1994). Utê Mûrûnû, petite fleur de cocotier (novel). Noumea: Grain de Sable. ISBN 2-84170-009-7.
- Déwé Gorodey (1996). L'Agenda (novel). Noumea: Grain de Sable. p. 124. ISBN 979-10-92894-028.
- Déwé Gorodey (1996). Par les temps qui courent (collection of aphorisms). foreword by Dominique Jouve. Noumea: Grain de Sable. p. 79. ISBN 2-8417-0025-9.
- Déwé Gorodey; Nicolas Kurtovitch (1999). Dire le vrai / To Tell the Truth (18 poems, bi-lingual). English translations by Raylene Ramsay and Brian Mackay. Noumea: éd. Grain de Sable.
- Déwé Gorodey; Nicolas Kurtovitch (2006). Dire le vrai (36 poems). Noumea: éd. Grain de Sable. ISBN 2841701212.
- Déwé Gorodey (2000). Kënâké (unpublished play, directed by Pierre Gope during the Festival of Melanesian Arts in Nouméa in 2000).
- Déwé Gorodey; Weniko Ihage (2002), Le vol de la parole (novel), Noumea: Edipop
- Déwé Gorodey (2004). The Kanak Apples Season (anthology of her novels). translated into English by Peter Brown. Sydney: Pandanus. ISBN 1740760409.
- Déwé Gorodey (2005). Sharing as Custom Provides (anthology of poems). translated into English by Raylene Ramsay and Deborah Walker. Sydney: Pandanus.
- Déwé Gorodey (2005). 'L'Épave (novel). Noumea: Madrépores. ISBN 2-9525502-0-4.
- Déwé Gorodey (2006). 30 ans du Palika - En chemin vers la citoyenneté (essay). Nouméa: Edipop. p. 23. ISBN 2906341010.
- Déwé Gorodey (2009). Graines de pin colonnaire (novel). Noumea: Madrépores. p. 166. ISBN 978-2-9525502-3-9.
- Déwé Gorodey (2012). Tâdo, Tâdo, wéé! (novel). Pirae: Au Vent des Iles. ISBN 978-2915654936.
- Déwé Gorodey; Nicolas Kurtovitch (2014). A l'orée du sable / La paix en soi (poems). La Roque-d'Anthéron, France: Vents d’ailleurs. ISBN 978-2-36413-055-5.
- Déwé Gorodey; Imasango (2016). Se donner le pays – Paroles jumelles (To give oneself the country - twin words) (poems). Foreword by Murielle Szac. Paris: Bruno Doucey. p. 136. ISBN 978-2-36229-130-2.
