= 2019 in Oceania =

Events in Oceania, during 2019.

== Sovereign states ==
=== Australia ===
(Australia)

- Chief of state: Queen Elizabeth II (since 1952)
- Governor-General –
  - Sir Peter Cosgrove (until 1 July)
  - David Hurley (starting 1 July)
- Prime Minister – Scott Morrison (since 2018)

==== Christmas Island ====
(Christmas Island)

- Governor General of the Commonwealth of Australia:
  - Sir Peter Cosgrove (until 1 July)
  - David Hurley (starting 1 July)
- Administrator: Natasha Griggs (since 2018)

==== Cocos (Keeling) Islands ====
(Cocos (Keeling) Islands)

- Governor General:
  - Sir Peter Cosgrove (until 1 July)
  - David Hurley (starting 1 July)
- Administrator: Natasha Griggs (since 2018)

==== Norfolk Island ====
(Norfolk Island)

- Administrator: Eric Hutchinson (since 2017)

=== East Timor / Timor-Leste ===
(Timor-Leste)

- President of East Timor: Francisco Guterres (since 2017)
- Prime Minister: Taur Matan Ruak (since 2018)

=== Fiji ===
(Fiji)

- President of Fiji: George Konrote (since 2015)
- Head of Government: Frank Bainimarama (since 2007)
- Speaker: Epeli Nailatikau (starting 11 February)

=== Kiribati ===
(Kiribati)

- President: Taneti Mamau (since 2016)

=== Marshall Islands ===
(Marshall Islands)

- President: Hilda Heine (since 2016)
- Speaker of the legislature: Kenneth Kedi (since 2016)

=== Micronesia ===
(Federated States of Micronesia)

- President of the Federated States of Micronesia
  - Peter M. Christian (until 11 May)
  - David W. Panuelo (starting 11 May)
- Vice President of the Federated States of Micronesia: Yosiwo George (since 2015)

=== Nauru ===
(Nauru)

- President of Nauru
  - Baron Waqa (until 27 August)
  - Lionel Aingimea (starting 27 August)
- Speaker of Parliament
  - Cyril Buraman (until August)
  - Marcus Stephen (starting 27 August)

=== Palau ===
(Palau)

- President of Palau: Thomas Remengesau Jr. (since 2013)
- Vice President: Raynold Oilouch (since 2017)

=== Papua New Guinea ===
(Papua New Guinea)

- Monarchy of Papua New Guinea: Elizabeth II
- Governor-General: Bob Dadae (since 2017)
- Prime Minister
  - Peter O'Neill (until 29 May)
  - James Marape (starting 29 May)

=== Realm of New Zealand ===
The Realm of New Zealand consists of the sovereign state of New Zealand, the associated states of the Cook Islands and Niue, and the dependent territory of Tokelau. It also includes the Antarctica territorial claim of the Ross Dependency.

- Monarchy of New Zealand: Elizabeth II
- Governor-General of New Zealand: Patsy Reddy

==== New Zealand ====
- Speaker of the New Zealand House of Representatives: Trevor Mallard
- Prime Minister of New Zealand: Jacinda Ardern (since 2017)
- Deputy Prime Minister of New Zealand: Winston Peters (since 2017)

==== Cook Islands ====
(Cook Islands)

- Queen's Representative: Tom Marsters (since 1973)
- Prime Minister of the Cook Islands: Henry Puna (since 2010)
- Speaker of the Cook Islands Parliament: Niki Rattle (since 2012)

==== Niue ====
(Niue)

- Premier of Niue: Toke Talagi (since 2008)

==== Tokelau ====
(Tokelau)

- Administrator of Tokelau: Ross Ardern (since 2018)
- Head of Government of Tokelau
  - Afega Gaualofa (until 12 March)
  - Kerisiano Kalolo (starting 12 March).

=== Samoa ===
(Samoa)

- Head of state: O le Ao o le Malo: Tuimalealiʻifano Vaʻaletoʻa Sualauvi II (since 2017)
- Prime Minister of Samoa: Tuilaʻepa Saʻilele Malielegaoi (since 1998)

=== Solomon Islands ===
(Solomon Islands)

- Governor-General
  - Frank Kabui (until 7 July)
  - David Vunagi (starting 7 July)
- Prime Minister
  - Rick Houenipwela (until 24 April)
  - Manasseh Sogavare (starting 24 April)

=== Tonga ===
(Tonga)

- Monarch: King Tupou VI (since 2012)
- Prime Minister
  - ʻAkilisi Pōhiva (until 12 September)
  - Semisi Sika (12 September-8 October)
  - Pohiva Tuʻiʻonetoa (starting 8 October)

=== Tuvalu ===
(Tuvalu)

- Head of State: Queen Elizabeth II
- Governor-General of Tuvalu
  - Iakoba Italeli (until 22 August)
  - Teniku Talesi Honolulu (starting 22 August)
- Prime Minister of Tuvalu
  - Enele Sopoaga (until 19 September)
  - Kausea Natano (starting 19 September)

=== Vanuatu ===
(Vanuatu)

- President of Vanuatu: Tallis Obed Moses (since 2017)
- Prime Minister of Vanuatu: Charlot Salwai (since 2016)

== Dependencies ==
=== British Overseas Territories ===
(United Kingdom)

- Monarch: Queen Elizabeth II (since 1952)

==== Pitcairn Islands ====
(Pitcairn Islands)

- Governor (nonresident) of the Pitcairn Islands: Laura Clarke (since 2018)
- Mayor and Chairman of the Island Council: Shawn Christian (until 31 December)

=== Chile ===
(Chile)

- President of Chile: Sebastián Piñera (since 2018)

==== Insular Chile ====
(Valparaíso Region)

- Intendant of Valparaíso Region: Jorge Martínez Durán
- Commune of the Juan Fernández Islands
  - Mayor: Felipe Paredes Vergara
- Province of Easter Island
  - Governor: Laura Alarcón Rapu (since 2018)

=== France ===
(France)

- President of France: Emmanuel Macron (since 2017)
- Prime Minister of France: Édouard Philippe (since 2017)

==== French Polynesia ====
(French Polynesia)

- President of French Polynesia: Édouard Fritch (since 2014)
- High Commissioner of the Republic
  - René Bidal (until 6 May)
  - Dominique Sorain (starting 6 May)
- President of the Assembly of French Polynesia: Gaston Tong Sang (since 2018)

==== New Caledonia ====
(New Caledonia)

- High Commissioner
  - Thierry Lataste (until 10 July)
  - Laurent Prevost (starting 10 July)
- President of the Government
  - Philippe Germain (until 6 July)
  - Thierry Santa (starting 6 July)
- Vice President of the Government
  - Jean-Louis d'Anglebermes (until 5 July)
  - Gilbert Tyuienon (starting 5 July)

==== Wallis and Futuna ====
(Wallis and Futuna)

- Administrator Superior of Wallis and Futuna: Thierry Queffelec (since 10 January)
- President of the Territorial Assembly:
  - David Vergé (until 29 November)
  - Atoloto Kolokilagi (starting 29 November)
- There are three traditional kings with limited powers.

=== United States ===
(United States)

- President of the United States: Donald Trump (since 2017)
- Vice President of the United States: Mike Pence (since 2017)

==== American Samoa ====
(American Samoa)

- Governor: Lolo Matalasi Moliga (since 2013)
- Lieutenant Governor: Lemanu Peleti Mauga (since 2013)

==== Guam ====
(Guam)

- Governor
  - Eddie Baza Calvo (until 7 January)
  - Lou Leon Guerrero (starting 7 January)
- Lieutenant Governor
  - Ray Tenorio (until 7 January)
  - Josh Tenorio (starting 7 January)

==== Hawaii ====
(Hawaii)

- Governor of Hawaii: David Ige (since 2014)
- Lieutenant Governor of Hawaii: Josh Green (since 2018)

==== Northern Mariana Islands ====
(Northern Mariana Islands)

- Governor: Ralph Deleon Guerrero Torres (since 2015)
- Lieutenant Governor
  - Victor Hocog (until 14 January)
  - Arnold Palacios (starting 14 January)

== Events ==
=== April ===
- April 3
  - General elections were held in the Solomon Islands. They were the first general elections since the RAMSI mission concluded in 2017. On 24 April 2019, Manasseh Sogavare was elected by the 11th National Parliament as Prime Minister of Solomon Islands.

=== August ===
- August 13
  - Samoan police confirmed they had foiled an assassination plot against Prime Minister Tuilaepa Sailele Malielegaoi.
- August 24
  - Parliamentary elections were held in Nauru. President Baron Waqa lost his seat in Boe Constituency, making him ineligible for a third term. Following the elections, Lionel Aingimea was elected president, winning a parliamentary vote 12–6 against David Adeang.

=== September ===
- September 9
  - General elections were held in Tuvalu. Enele Sopoaga, the caretaker prime minister was re-elected to parliament. However, the members of parliament elected Kausea Natano as prime minister.

=== November ===
- November 23 – 2019 Bougainvillean independence referendum.
- 81 deaths from measles outbreak from lack of vaccination in Samoa

=== December ===
- 5 December
  - The deadly measles epidemic in Samoa has led to the United Nations' World Health Organization to deploy 128 medical teams to assist in vaccination efforts. The UN's Central Emergency Response Fund (CERF) allocated $2.7 million to support the response.
- December 7 A non-binding independence referendum was held in Bougainville, an autonomous region of Papua New Guinea, between 23 November and 7 December 2019.
- December 11 - The results of the referendum are announced. Over 98% of the votes are in favour of independence.

== See also ==
- List of state leaders in Oceania in 2019
- List of elections in 2019 in Oceania
- 2019 Oceania Cup (rugby league)

=== Articles on Elections ===
- Micronesian parliamentary election, 2019 5 March 2019
- Australia
  - New South Wales state election, 2019 23 March 2019
  - Tasmanian Legislative Council election, 2019 4 May 2019
  - Australian federal election, 2019 18 May 2019
- Solomon Islands general election, 2019 3 April 2019
- Nauruan parliamentary election, 2019 24 August 2019
- New Zealand local elections, 2019 12 October 2019
- Bougainvillean independence referendum 23 November 2019
- Marshallese general election, 2019 18 November 2019
- Kiribati parliamentary election, 2019 December 2019
