= Isabelle Champmoreau =

New Caledonian politician

Vice President of the Government of New Caledonia
- In office 22 July 2021 – 16 January 2025
- Preceded by: Gilbert Tyuienon

Personal details
- Born: 19 February 1975 (age 51) Nouméa, New Caledonia, France
- Party: The Rally
- Occupation: Politician

Isabelle Champmoreau (born 19 February 1975) is a New Caledonian politician who serves as the Vice President of the Government of New Caledonia. She is a member of The Rally-UMP, and served in the government of Harold Martin. She is a teacher by profession.

== Career ==
Champmoreau was municipal councilor of Nouméa from 2001 under Jean Lèques and later saved as deputy mayor. Elected to the government of Thierry Santa in 2019, she is the only woman serving in the 17th government and is in charge of education, disability, the family, the fight against intra-family violence and animal welfare.
