= 2004 New Caledonian legislative election =

← 1999	9 May 2004	2009 →
- All 54 seats in the Congress; 28 seats needed for a majority
Party	Leader	Vote %	Seats
AE	Marie-Noëlle Thémereau	22.70	16
The Rally	Jacques Lafleur	24.43	16
UNI		14.02	8
UC	Pascal Naouna	11.86	7
FCCI	François Burck	3.20	1
LKS	Nidoïsh Naisseline	2.88	1
UC-R	Jacques Lalié	1.77	1
This lists parties that won seats. See the complete results below.
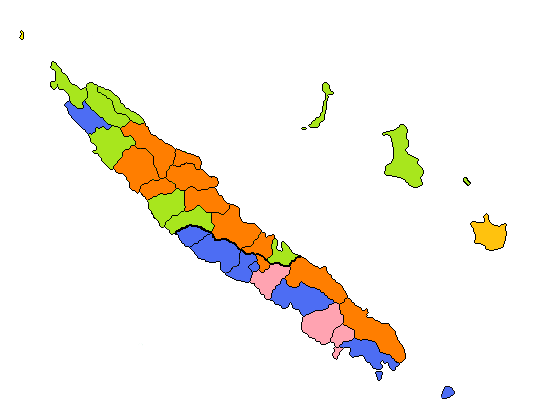
Results by province.
President before	President after
Pierre Frogier; The Rally (New Caledonia)	Marie-Noëlle Thémereau; AE

Legislative elections were held in New Caledonia on 9 May 2004 to elect members of Congress. Although the Rally for Caledonia in the Republic and Future Together both won 16 seats, Future Together's Marie-Noëlle Thémereau became President.

== Results ==
Party	Votes	%	Seats
The Rally–UMP	21,880	24.43	16
Future Together	20,328	22.70	16
UNI–FLNKS	12,554	14.02	8
Caledonian Union	10,623	11.86	7
National Front	6,135	6.85	4
Federation of Pro-Independence Co-operation Committees	2,864	3.20	1
Kanak Socialist Liberation	2,575	2.88	1
FLNKS for Independence	2,097	2.34	0
Caledonia My Country	1,908	2.13	0
Chiraquian Movement of Christian Democrats–UMP	1,620	1.81	0
Renewed Caledonian Union	1,587	1.77	1
Movement of Caledonian Citizens	1,140	1.27	0
Building the Future Together	1,010	1.13	0
Heritage and Environment with the Greens	861	0.96	0
Oceanic Union	749	0.84	0
Advance	652	0.73	0
French Agreement of the North–National Front	549	0.61	0
Oceanic Rally in Caledonia	430	0.48	0
Total	89,562	100.00	54
Valid votes	89,562	98.01	
Invalid/blank votes	1,816	1.99	
Total votes	91,378	100.00	
Registered voters/turnout	119,541	76.44	
Source: Juridoc

=== By bloc ===
Party	Votes	%	Seats	+/–
Loyalists; LR, AE, FN, MCC, UC, Avance, ROC	51,863	57.91	36	+1
Separatists; UNI, FLNKS, UC, FCCI, LKS, MCDC, UC–R, CEA, LV	35,791	39.96	18	–1
Neutral; CMP	1,908	2.13	0	0
Total	89,562	100.00	54	0
Valid votes	89,562	98.01		
Invalid/blank votes	1,816	1.99		
Total votes	91,378	100.00		
Registered voters/turnout	119,541	76.44		
