= Rally for Caledonia =

Rally for Caledonia Rassemblement pour la Calédonie
- Leader: Isabelle Lafleur
- Founded: 2006
- Dissolved: 2017
- Succeeded by: Caledonian Republicans
- Ideology: Anti-separatism; Gaullism
- National affiliation: Union for a Popular Movement
- Colours: Blue, white, red

Website
- www.bulletindinformation.com

The Rally for Caledonia (French: Rassemblement pour la Calédonie, RPC) was a Gaullist political party in New Caledonia, strongly supportive of the French status of the region; it is close to the French Union for a Popular Movement.

== History ==
Jacques Lafleur had been the historical leader of the right-wing anti-independence Rally for Caledonia in the Republic (RPCR) since the party's creation in 1977. However, in 2005, Lafleur announced his intentions to step down in favour of Pierre Frogier, who represented New Caledonia's second constituency and was a close supporter of the President of the UMP in France, now-President Nicolas Sarkozy. Frogier was seen as Lafleur's chosen successor. However, he came back on this decision and ran against Frogier for the RPCR leadership at the party congress. Frogier defeated Lafleur by a large margin.

In January 2006, Lafleur announced the creation of a new political newspaper in New Caledonia, the Bulletin d'Information. In the April 2006 edition of the paper, he announced the creation of a new party, which would take the original name of the RPCR, the Rally for Caledonia. He criticized the RPCR for being a "small Rally" as opposed to a "large Rally". Senator Simon Loueckhote soon joined the RPC.

In the New Caledonia's first constituency, Lafleur's constituency, Lafleur was defeated by the first round of the 2007 French legislative election by a number of candidates, most notably the RPCR's Gaël Yanno. Yanno went on to win the seat in an easy runoff.

With Lafleur's defeat, the RPC's only parliamentarian was the island's sole Senator, the anti-independence Kanak Simon Loueckhote. However, Loueckhote left the RPC in April 2008 to found his own party, the Movement for Diversity.

In the 2009 election, the RPC obtained 4.46% and only one seat in the Congress of New Caledonia.

Lafleur left his seat in the Congress in 2010 to Jean-Luc Regent. The former leader of the anti-independists and founder of the RPC died on 4 December 2010. His daughter, Isabelle Lafleur, has succeeded him as leader of the RPC.
