= Tyuienon =

Tyuienon is a surname. Notable people with the surname include:

- Gilbert Tyuienon (born 1958), New Caledonian politician
- Isabelle Tyuienon, New Caledonian activist
