= Philippe Blaise =

French politician

Member of the Congress of New Caledonia
- Incumbent
- Assumed office May 11, 2014
- Constituency: South Province

Personal details
- Born: 9 April 1969 (age 56) Nouméa, New Caledonia
- Party: Caledonian Republican Movement (since 2011)
- Other political affiliations: Rally for Caledonia in the Republic (before 2011)

Philippe Blaise (born August 4, 1969) is a politician and former banker from New Caledonia. He is the chairman of the Caledonian Republican Movement.

== Biography ==
In 2011, he founded the Caledonian Republican Movement along with other dissident members of the Rally for Caledonia in the Republic party in Nouméa due to disagreements with Pierre Frogier's decision to fly the Kanak flag alongside the French tricolour from public buildings in the New Caledonia capital and wanting to start a new party to focus on local issues. Blaise had been a member of the Collective for a Common Flag group which calls for New Caledonia to adopt a new common flag for the island. In 2014, he was elected as a member of the Congress of New Caledonia.
