= Caledonian Republican Movement =

Caledonian Republican Movement Mouvement républicain calédonien
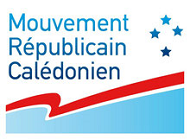
- Abbreviation: MRC
- President: Philippe Blaise
- Vice President: Christophe Loueckhote
- Deputy General: Frédéric Decourt; Adrien Droin; Alésio Saliga
- General Secretary: Cedric Pascal
- Founded: 14 July 2011
- Split from: The Rally
- Headquarters: Noumea
- Ideology: Anti-separatism; Conservative liberalism Localism
- Political position: Centre-right
- Regional affiliation: Les Loyalistes
- Seats in the Congress: 1 / 54
- Seats in the South Province: 1 / 40
- Seats in the North Province: 0 / 22

Website
- www.mouvement-republicain-caledonien.com

The Caledonian Republican Movement (French: Mouvement républicain calédonien; abbreviated MRC) is a New Caledonian conservative liberal party and think-tank founded in 2011 by Philippe Blaise, a former banker, spokesman for the Collective for a Common Flag organisation and a municipal councilor in Noumea who split from The Rally. The party serves local politics in Noumea and opposes the independence of New Caledonia.

== History ==
The MRC was founded on July 14, 2011, and originated from the Caledonian Republican Foundation think-tank which had been founded by members of The Rally who opposed to the proposal made in 2010 by party president Pierre Frogier to fly the New Caledonian independence flag on public buildings alongside the French tricolour. Members also participated in the Collective for a Common Flag proposal which called for New Caledonia to adopt unifying flag in accordance with the Nouméa Accord. Among the party's founders included Philippe Blaise a member of the Congress of New Caledonia and a local councilor in Noumea, Christophe Loueckhote originally from Ouvéa who is president of the Noumea renters and tenants association and the brother of politician Simon Loueckhote, and Tristan Derycke, a doctor at the Gaston-Bourret Territorial Hospital in Noumea and a spokesperson for the Inter-Union of hospital workers in New Caledonia. Since 2020, the party has participated in Les Loyalistes electoral coalition in the Congress of New Caledonia.
