= Flags of New Caledonia =

New Caledonia
- Both flags used by New Caledonia

- National flag, always used
- Use: National flag
- Proportion: 2:3 (habitual)
- Adopted: 15 February 1794
- Design: A vertical tricolour of blue, white, and red
- FLNKS flag, often used
- Use: Civil and state flag
- Proportion: 1:2
- Adopted: 13 July 2010 (non-binding)
- Design: A horizontal tricolour of blue, red, and green charged with a yellow disc outlined in black and defaced with a black flèche faîtière

Two flags are in use in the French overseas territory of New Caledonia: the French national flag, which was the only official flag used to represent New Caledonia until 2010, and the flag of Kanak and Socialist National Liberation Front (FLNKS), a Kanak political party favouring independence for New Caledonia. A majority of New Caledonian communes, but not all, now fly both flags, the rest flying only the French flag.

== Overview ==
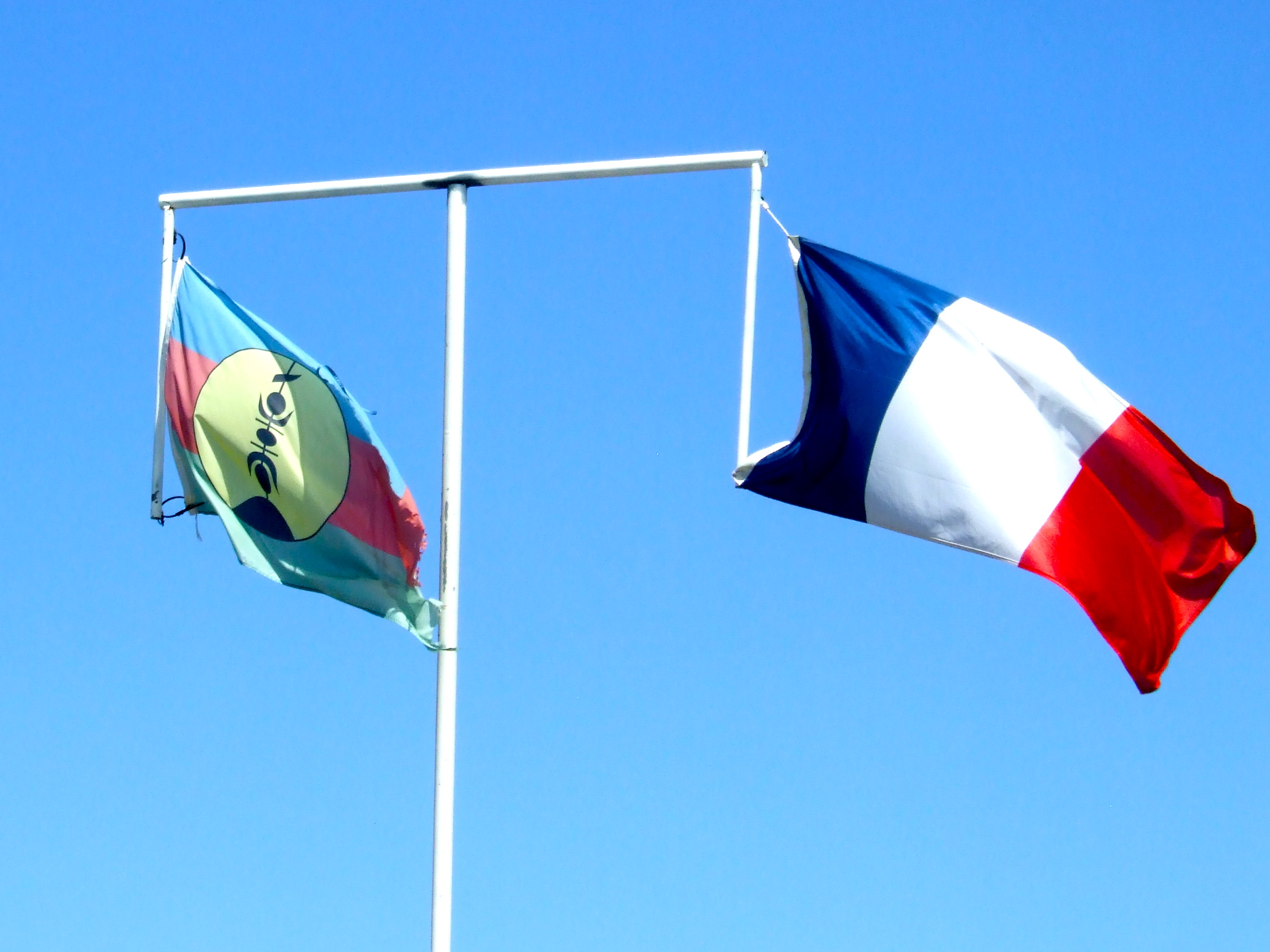
Kanak and French flags flying from the same flagpole, Nouméa, March 2011

The Nouméa Accord was a compromise agreement signed in 1998 by the French government and pro- and anti-separatist parties in New Caledonia. Among its provisions was the gradual recognition of five "identity signs" for New Caledonia: an anthem, a motto, local symbols on New Caledonian currency, a flag, and a potential new name for the territory.

In 2008, the government of New Caledonia debated the introduction of an official regional flag and anthem. A flag in fairly widespread unofficial use was the flag of the FLNKS, thus a highly controversial emblem, and the French flag remained the only officially used one.

In July 2010, the Congress of New Caledonia voted in favour of a non legally-binding proposal (known in French as vœu, 'wish') to fly both flags side-by-side in the territory. On 17 July 2010, French Prime Minister François Fillon took part in a ceremony in Nouméa where the FLNKS flag was hoisted alongside the French tricolour. This coexistence proved controversial, with New Caledonian member of the National Assembly Gaël Yanno describing it as "akin to raising the Palestinian flag over the Knesset". In the capital city Nouméa, the first raising of the FLNKS flag on the town hall happened without any ceremony, as the mayor refused to participate.

On 18 August 2010, the Congress of New Caledonia officially adopted the anthem Soyons unis, devenons frères, alongside an official motto ("Terre de parole, terre de partage"; "Land of speech, land of sharing") and local symbols on New Caledonian currency. There was not yet agreement on recognition of a flag or a new name for the territory. Congress deputies reserved the possibility of amending the lyrics of the anthem at a later date.

The combination of flags was used for the first time during New Caledonia's participation at the 2011 Pacific Games. According to Philippe Gomès, then President of the Government of New Caledonia, "this flag was imposed on us. Is it representative of all communities? No, it's the flag of the Kanak, the flag of independence. Is it the choice of all? No, it's the choice of a lone man who chose to play along with the independence movement". Thus, the debate on finding a permanent official regional flag continued as the adoption of the Kanak flag proved controversial. Some New Caledonians argued for a completely new flag for New Caledonia, which would incorporate designs from the French and Kanak flags in a stated aim to promote a "common destiny" for ethnic Kanaks and Caldoches (New Caledonians of European descent).

On 14 February 2025, the appellate administrative court of Paris ruled that display of the FLNKS flag on driving licences was illegal, because the July 2010 resolution on the flag did not conform to the process outlined in the Nouméa Accord, unlike the August 2010 approval of the anthem.

== FLNKS political flag ==
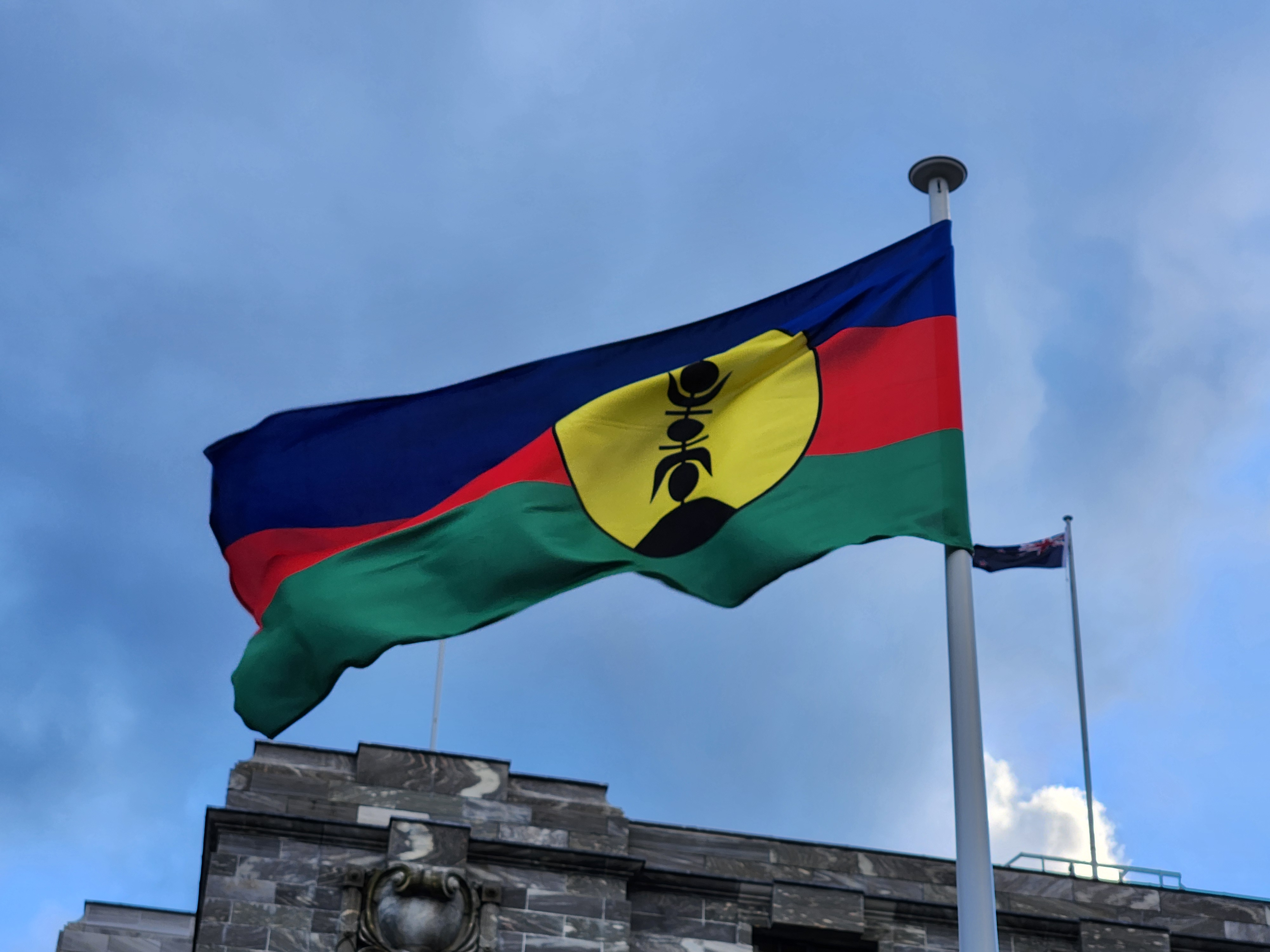
Kanak flag of New Caledonia flown outside Parliament House in Wellington, New Zealand, July 2026

The FLNKS flag, first adopted by the party in 1980, is composed of three horizontal stripes of blue (Pantone 286c), red (Pantone 032c) and green (Pantone 347c) charged with a yellow (Pantone 102c) disc of a diameter two-thirds the height of the flag centered at a position of one-third the width of the flag, measured from the hoist side. The disc is defaced with a vertical symbol in black and sometimes outlined in black. When used as the Flag of New Caledonia, the Société Française de Vexillologie (SFV) has objected to the bordering of the disc with black as erroneous, citing Wikipedia as the source of the error. The SFV cites the publication by the French Navy's Hydrographic and Oceanographic Service, Album des pavillons nationaux et des marques distinctives, as authoritative in establishing that the golden disc is not outlined by a black border. (Note: The SHOM's Album specifies the proportions as 2:3 but locally produced variants can have proportions of 1:2.) Both bordered and unbordered variants are displayed locally and even appear on social media accounts of the FLNKS. It has a similar color pattern to that used in the flag of Azerbaijan.

The blue symbolizes both the sky and the Pacific Ocean. The red symbolizes the blood shed by the Kanaks in their struggle for independence, socialism, and unity. The green symbolizes the land itself and by extension the ancestors buried within it. The yellow disc is a representation of the sun and the symbol upon it consists of a flèche faitière, a kind of arrow that adorns the roofs of Kanak houses thrust through tutut shells.

The solution of the two flags is on the other hand denounced by the historical loyalist leader Jacques Lafleur (for whom “New Caledonia has a flag, that of the French Republic”) as well as the president of the government Philippe Gomès and his party Calédonie ensemble who would prefer a local flag inspired by the South African example.

Finally, on 13 July 2010, the Congress of New Caledonia adopted the wish “that the flag, the description of which is appended, and the national flag be flown together in New Caledonia. However, this wish has no binding legal force and each local authority is left free to apply it or not.

The municipality of La Foa has also refused to hoist the FLNKS flag, and before it, that of Bourail. But FLNKS militants ended up imposing it, during an unofficial ceremony where the mayor of the commune, Brigitte El Arbi, was not present.

On 17 July 2010, Prime Minister François Fillon, on an official trip to the archipelago, hoisted the Kanak flag and the French flag together for the first time on the headquarters of the High Commission of the Republic in the presence of local authorities.

== Provincial flags ==
New Caledonia is divided into three provinces, each with its own flag.

Flag of South Province

Flag of North Province

Flag of the Loyalty Islands

== Other flags ==
One of the various flags used to represent the New Caledonian team at the Pacific Games and in sporting events, all of which depict a stylised kagu in the centre

Flag icon used by FIFA to represent the New Caledonia football team. The icon combines the two flags which are displayed at the team's matches.

French tricolour defaced with the emblem of New Caledonia

== See also ==
- Emblem of New Caledonia
