= Isabelle Ohlen =

French politician in New Caledonia

Isabelle Marie Paulette Ohlen is a politician from New Caledonia.

== Biography ==
Ohlen began her career as a teacher in the province of Poindimié before entering politics. From 2004 to 2008, she held the position of vice-president of the Congress of New Caledonia. From 2010 to 2012, she held a number of positions on Congress committees and working groups. As a politician, she was a member of the L'Avenir Ensemble (Future Together party).

Ohlen represented New Caledonia in Washington, D.C. to lobby for the recognition of the lagoon and coral reef of New Caledonia as a UNESCO World Heritage Site. In 2008, the application succeeded; it was the first site in one of France's overseas territories to be recognised.

Ohlen was also active in a local heritage protection organisation, Association Racine. In 2006, she served as the association's president and lobbied for the preservation of colonial houses and the introduction of regulations over the range of architectural styles permitted in new residential buildings.

== Publications ==
- Ohlen, I., & Devinck, F. (January 1, 2008). Les lagons de la Nouzelle-Calédonie. Monumental / Ministère De La Culture Et De La Francophonie, 84-85.
