= Annie Beustes =

French politician (born 1945)

Vice President of the Government of New Caledonia
- In office 7 August 2007 – 21 August 2007
- Preceded by: Déwé Gorodey
- Succeeded by: Déwé Gorodey

Personal details
- Born: 15 June 1945 (age 80) Arget, Nouvelle-Aquitaine, France
- Party: The Rally–UMP
- Occupation: Politician

Annie Beustes (born 15 June 1945) is a French politician in New Caledonia. She has served in the Congress of New Caledonia as a member of The Rally–UMP, and is anti-independence; she also served in the government of Jean Lèques.

She served a short term as Vice President of the Government of New Caledonia in August 2007, and was succeeded by Déwé Gorodey of the Kanak and Socialist National Liberation Front (FLNKS: Front de Libération Nationale Kanak et Socialiste).
