= Ounei =

Ounei is a surname. Notable people with the surname include:

- Emile Ounei (born 1996), New Caledonian footballer
- Susanna Ounei (1945–2016), New Caledonian activist and feminist
