= Movement for Diversity =

Movement for Diversity Mouvement de la diversité
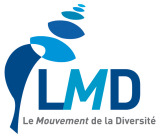
- Abbreviation: LMD
- President: Simon Loueckhote
- Founded: 10 April 2008; 18 years ago
- Dissolved: 2017
- Split from: Rally for Caledonia
- Merged into: The Caledonian Republicans
- Headquarters: 34 rue Gallieni, Centre-Ville, 98800 Nouméa
- Ideology: Anti-independence; Autonomism
- Political position: Right-wing
- Colours: Blue

The Movement for Diversity (French: Mouvement de la diversité; LMD) was a political party in New Caledonia. Founded in 2008 by Simon Loueckhote, it opposed the independence of New Caledonia from France while supporting greater autonomy for the territory.

== History ==
Jacques Lafleur, the former leader of the loyalist Rally for Caledonia in the Republic (RPCR), left that party in 2006 and established the Rally for Caledonia (RPC). Loueckhote, an anti-independence Kanak politician who was then New Caledonia's representative in the Senate of France, joined the RPC and became its president.

Loueckhote contested the 2008 municipal election in Nouméa with a list named Nouméa, la diversité en mouvement. Following the election, he broke with the RPC and founded the Movement for Diversity on 10 April 2008. Its founding congress was subsequently held in Nouméa in June 2008.

In the 2009 provincial election, the LMD participated in a joint list with Future Together in the South Province. Led by Harold Martin, the list received 9,894 votes, or 16.33% of the valid vote, and won eight of the province's 40 seats. Six of the elected provincial councillors represented Future Together and two represented the LMD. The list also secured six seats in the Congress of New Caledonia, one of which was held by Loueckhote.

In the Loyalty Islands Province, the LMD ran a separate list named Une province avec la France. It received 516 votes and failed to win representation.

The LMD later participated in several alliances of anti-independence parties. In 2017, it merged with other parties and political figures into The Caledonian Republicans.

== Election results ==
=== Provincial elections ===
Election	Province	Candidate list	Votes	Vote share	Provincial seats won	LMD provincial councillors	LMD members elected to Congress
2009	South Province	Future Together–LMD	9,894	16.33%	8 of 40	2	1
2009	Loyalty Islands Province	A Province with France	516	3.60%	0 of 14	0	0
