= Vice President of the Government of New Caledonia =

Deputy head of the executive branch of New Caledonia

Vice President of Government of New Caledonia
- Coat of arms of New Caledonia

- Incumbent; Christopher Gygès since 31 July 2026
- Residence: Nouméa, South Province
- Term length: 5 years
- Formation: 28 May 1999
- First holder: Léopold Jorédié
- Website: gouv.nc

The vice president of the Government of New Caledonia (French: Vice-Président du gouvernement de la Nouvelle-Calédonie) is a political position in the Government of New Caledonia formed in 1999, after the Nouméa Accord was signed in 1998.

New Caledonia has a collegial government with 11 members elected by Congress of New Caledonia with proportional representation on party list voting, according to the rule of the highest average. Then, according to the Nouméa Accord, the 11 members elect President and Vice President among themselves.

According to the Nouméa Accord, the vice president in the collegial government system had to come from a pro-independence party if the president came from an anti-independence party and the other way round whenever the president comes from a pro-independence party. Even if the position of vice president is not filled, the government is deemed to be fully operational seven days after all government members are elected.

== List of officeholders ==
No.	Portrait	Name (Birth–Death)	Term of office			Party
No.	Portrait	Name (Birth–Death)	Took office	Left office	Time in office	Party
1		Léopold Jorédié (1947–2013)	28 May 1999	5 April 2001	1 year, 312 days	FCCI
2		Déwé Gorodey (1949–2022)	5 April 2001	7 August 2007	6 years, 124 days	FLNKS
3		Annie Beustes (born 1945)	7 August 2007	21 August 2007	14 days	The Rally
4		Déwé Gorodey (1949–2022)	21 August 2007	5 June 2009	1 year, 288 days	FLNKS
5		Pierre Ngaiohni (born 1956)	5 June 2009	11 March 2011	1 year, 279 days	Caledonian Union
6		Gilbert Tyuienon (born 1958)	11 March 2011	5 June 2014	3 years, 86 days	Caledonian Union
Position vacant (5 June 2014 – 1 April 2015)
7		Jean-Louis d'Anglebermes (born 1953)	1 April 2015	5 July 2019	4 years, 95 days	Caledonian Union
8		Gilbert Tyuienon (born 1958)	9 July 2019	22 July 2021	2 years, 13 days	Caledonian Union
9		Isabelle Champmoreau (born 1975)	22 July 2021	16 January 2025	3 years, 178 days	The Rally
Position vacant (16 January 2025 – 31 July 2026)
10		Christopher Gygès	31 July 2026	Incumbent	107 days	The Loyalists

== Timeline ==
This is a graphical lifespan timeline of vice presidents of the Government of New Caledonia. They are listed in order of office (Gorodey and Tyuienon are shown in order of their first terms).

== See also ==
- Politics of New Caledonia
- High Commissioner of the Republic in New Caledonia
