= Pascal Vittori =

New Caledonian politician

Pascal Vittori (born 16 August 1966, in Nouméa) is a New Caledonian politician. He is a member of the Future Together party, of which he serves as secretary. Since 2008, he has served as the New Centre's representative in New Caledonia. In 2004, he replaced Marie-Noëlle Thémereau in the Congress of New Caledonia.

In 2020, he was elected mayor of Bouloupari.
