= Léopold Jorédié =

New Caledonian politician (1947–2013)

Vice President of the Government of New Caledonia
- In office 28 May 1999 – 5 April 2001
- Preceded by: Office established
- Succeeded by: Déwé Gorodey

Personal details
- Born: 1947
- Died: 8 September 2013 (aged 65–66)
- Occupation: Politician

Léopold Jorédié (1947 – 8 September 2013) was a former Vice President of the Government of New Caledonia who served under Jean Lèques. As VP he was given a suspended sentence for corruption. In 2007 he was declared unfit to hold public office and declared bankrupt. He was a member of the Federation of Pro-Independence Co-operation Committees. Although the FCCI itself is a moderate nationalist party, from the 1980s onward he was seen as more militant and even open to "armed struggle" against the French.
