= Hilarion Vendégou =

French politician (1941–2020)

High Chief of the Isle of Pines
- In office 26 September 1974 – 11 January 2020
- Preceded by: Barthélémy Vendégou

Mayor of L'Île-des-Pins
- In office 1989–2019
- Preceded by: Samuel Vendégou
- Succeeded by: Sarah Vendégou
- Constituency: 1st

Personal details
- Born: 4 September 1941 Isle of Pines, New Caledonia, France
- Died: 11 January 2020 (aged 78)
- Citizenship: French
- Party: The Rally-UMP
- Other political affiliations: Union for a Popular Movement
- Tribe: Vao
- ^{1} Formally enthroned 7 July 1979

Hilarion Tumi Vendégou (4 September 1941 – 11 January 2020) was a French politician, the high chief of the Isle of Pines, in New Caledonia, and the mayor of the commune. He was recognised as grand chef in 1974, but, due to a violent succession dispute with his relative Jean-Marie Vendégou, was not formally enthroned until 7 July 1979. He was also the mayor of the island commune, until 2014.

On 11 January 2020, Vendégou died at the age of 78. He is survived by his daughter Laura Vendégou
