= Arget =

- Commune
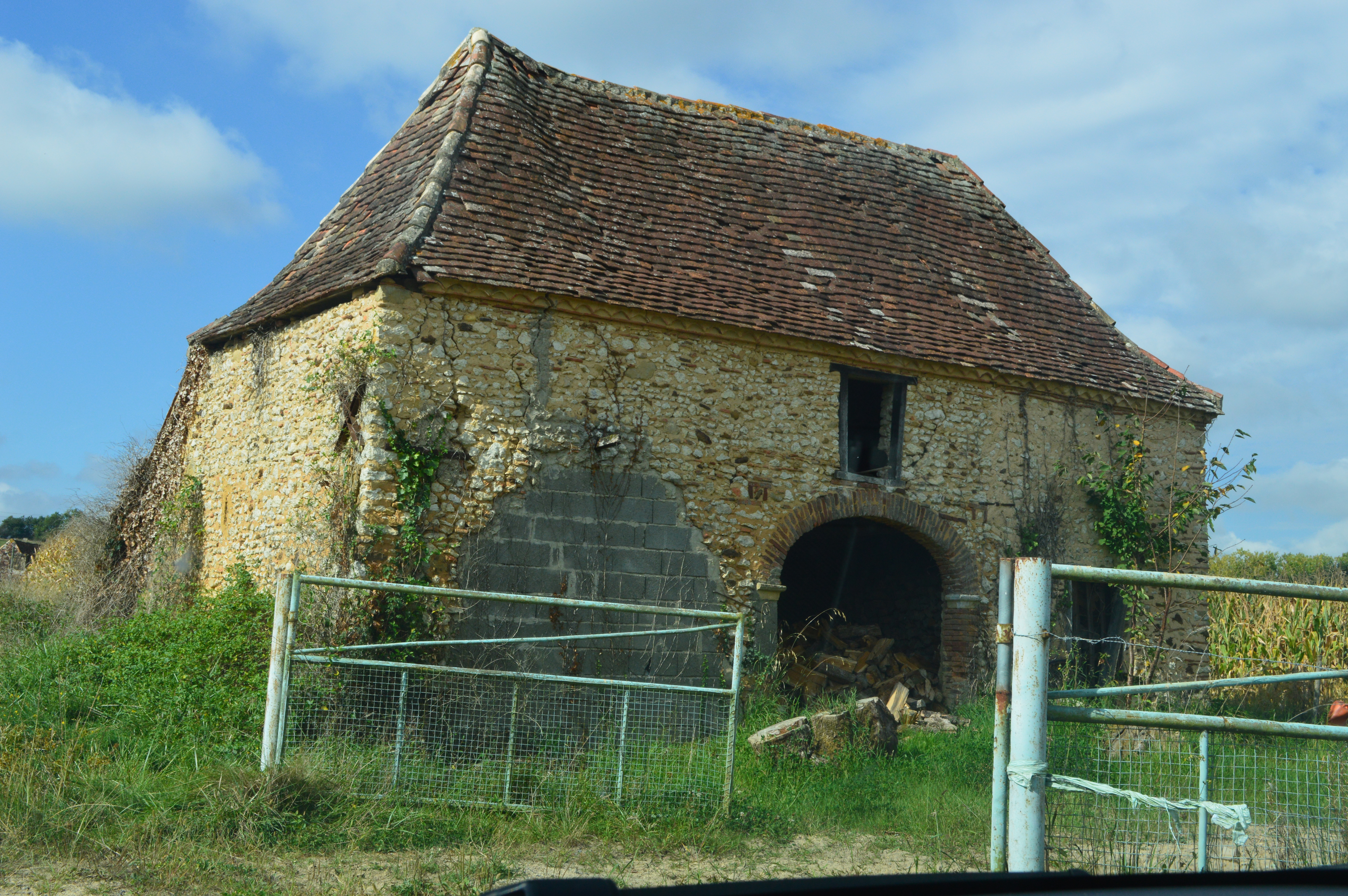
- An old farmhouse in Arget
- Location of Arget
- Location within France Location within Nouvelle-Aquitaine
- Coordinates: 43°32′38″N 0°31′38″W
- Country: France
- Region: Nouvelle-Aquitaine
- Department: Pyrénées-Atlantiques
- Arrondissement: Pau
- Canton: Artix et Pays de Soubestre
- Intercommunality: Luys en Béarn

Government
  - Mayor (2020–2026): Thierry Soustra
- Area^{1}: 4.00 km^{2} (1.54 sq mi)
- Elevation: 131 m (430 ft)
- Highest elevation: 182 m (597 ft)
- Lowest elevation: 75 m (246 ft)
- Population (2023): 76
  - Density: 19/km^{2} (49/sq mi)
- Time zone: UTC+01:00 (CET)
  - Summer (DST): UTC+02:00 (CEST)
- INSEE/Postal code: 64044 /64410
- ^{1} French Land Register data, which excludes lakes, ponds, glaciers > 1 km^{2} (0.386 sq mi or 247 acres) and river estuaries.

Arget (French pronunciation: [aʁʒɛt]; Occitan: Argent) is a commune in Pyrénées-Atlantiques, a department in the Nouvelle-Aquitaine region of south-western France. It is part of the traditional province of Béarn.

== Geography ==
Arget is located 18 km north-east of Orthez and 12 km south-east of Hagetmau on the border between the Pyrénées-Atlantiques and Landes departments. It can be accessed by the D264 road from Montagut in the east passing through the commune and the village (of two buildings) and continuing south-west to Casteide-Candau. The commune has quite large areas of forest in the west but is mostly farmland.

Several streams rise in the commune with the Hourquet forming the north-western border as it flows north-east to join the Ruisseau de la Rance at the northern tip of the commune. The Rance forms the north-eastern border as it flows north-west. The south-eastern border also consists of an unnamed stream which joins the Rance just outside the eastern tip of the commune.

=== Places and hamlets ===
- Bayoc
- Boué
- Capère
- Carrèrot
- Castagnet
- Conte
- Cousnat
- Glaude
- Herris
- Hibet
- Hourcq
- Ménou
- Montaut
- Pourtique
- Régidou
- Séris
- Touroun
- Vignau

== Toponymy ==
The commune name in béarnais is Arget.

Michel Grosclaude was unable to justify the local belief that the name means "sandy place" from arena (meaning "sand") with the collective suffix -etum (giving arenetum then arenet then areet then ariet), and could not conclude other than "of uncertain origin and meaning".

The following table details the origins of the commune name and other names in the commune.

| Name | Spelling | Date | Source | Page | Origin | Description |
|---|---|---|---|---|---|---|
| Arget | Argiet | 1383 | Raymond | 10 | Luntz | Village |
| | Arzet | 1695 | Raymond | 10 | Order of Malta | |
| | Arget | 1750 | Cassini | | | |

Sources:

- Raymond: Topographic Dictionary of the Department of Basses-Pyrenees, 1863, on the page numbers indicated in the table. (in French)
- Grosclaude: Toponymic Dictionary of communes, Béarn, 2006 (in French)

Origins:

- Luntz:
- Order of Malta: Titles of the Order of Malta

== History ==
Paul Raymond said on page 10 of his 1863 Topographical Dictionary of the Department of Basses-Pyrenees that Arget depended on the Commandery of Malta of Caubin and Morlaàs and on the Barony of Moustrou, built in 1647, and was a vassal of the Viscounts of Béarn.

== Administration ==
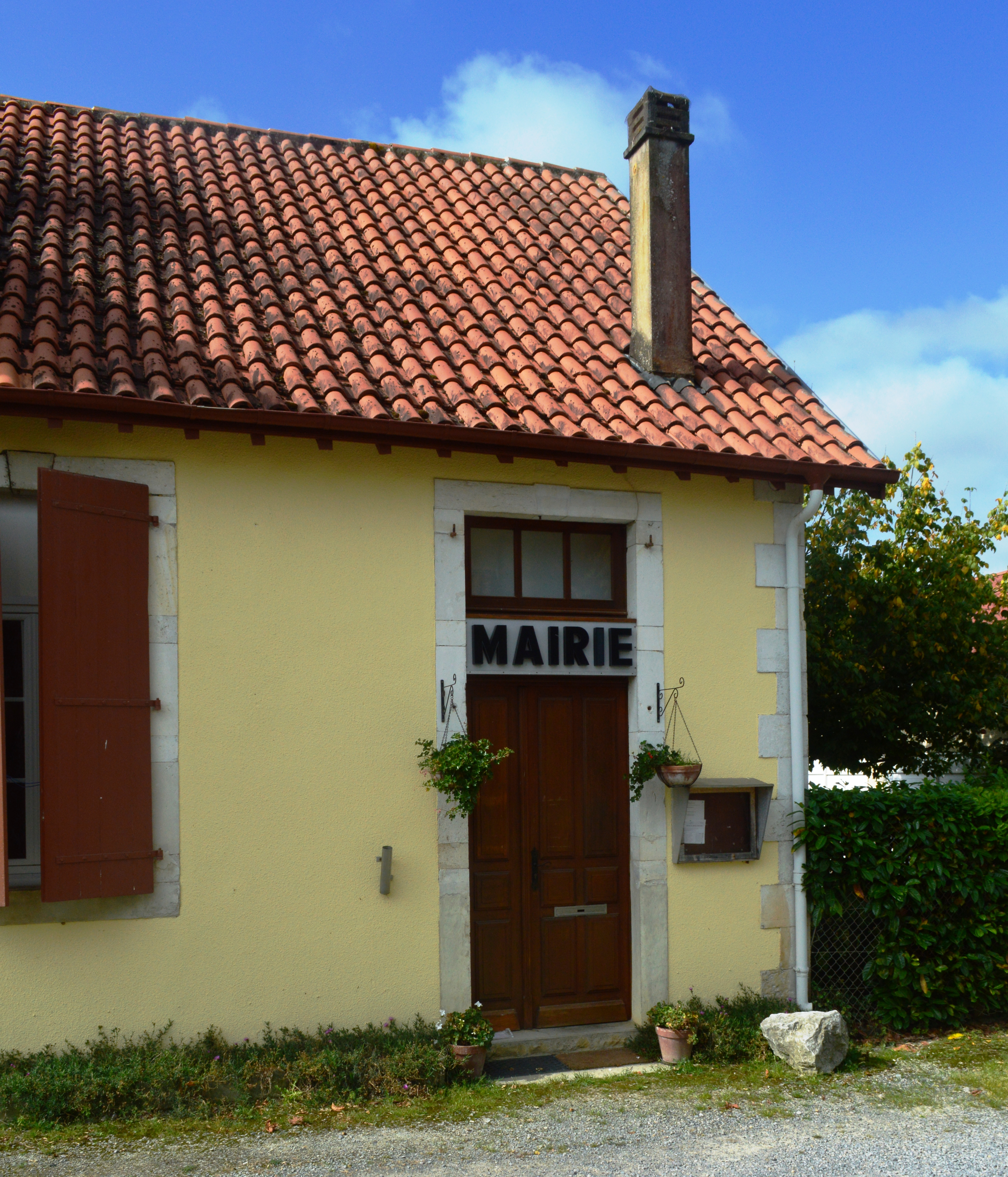
The Town Hall

List of Successive Mayors

| From | To | Name |
|---|---|---|
| 1995 | 2001 | Chantal Gallenmuller |
| 2001 | 2026 | Thierry Soustra |

== Demography ==
The inhabitants of the commune are known as Argétois or Argétoises in French.

Historical population

| Year | Pop. | ±% p.a. |
|---|---|---|
| 1793 | 213 | — |
| 1821 | 223 | +0.16% |
| 1846 | 303 | +1.23% |
| 1872 | 190 | −1.78% |
| 1901 | 167 | −0.44% |
| 1926 | 151 | −0.40% |
| 1946 | 119 | −1.18% |
| 1962 | 110 | −0.49% |
| 1968 | 99 | −1.74% |

| Year | Pop. | ±% p.a. |
|---|---|---|
| 1975 | 100 | +0.14% |
| 1982 | 97 | −0.43% |
| 1990 | 79 | −2.53% |
| 1999 | 83 | +0.55% |
| 2007 | 89 | +0.88% |
| 2012 | 89 | +0.00% |
| 2017 | 78 | −2.60% |
| 2023 | 76 | −0.43% |

Source: EHESS and INSEE

== Culture and heritage ==
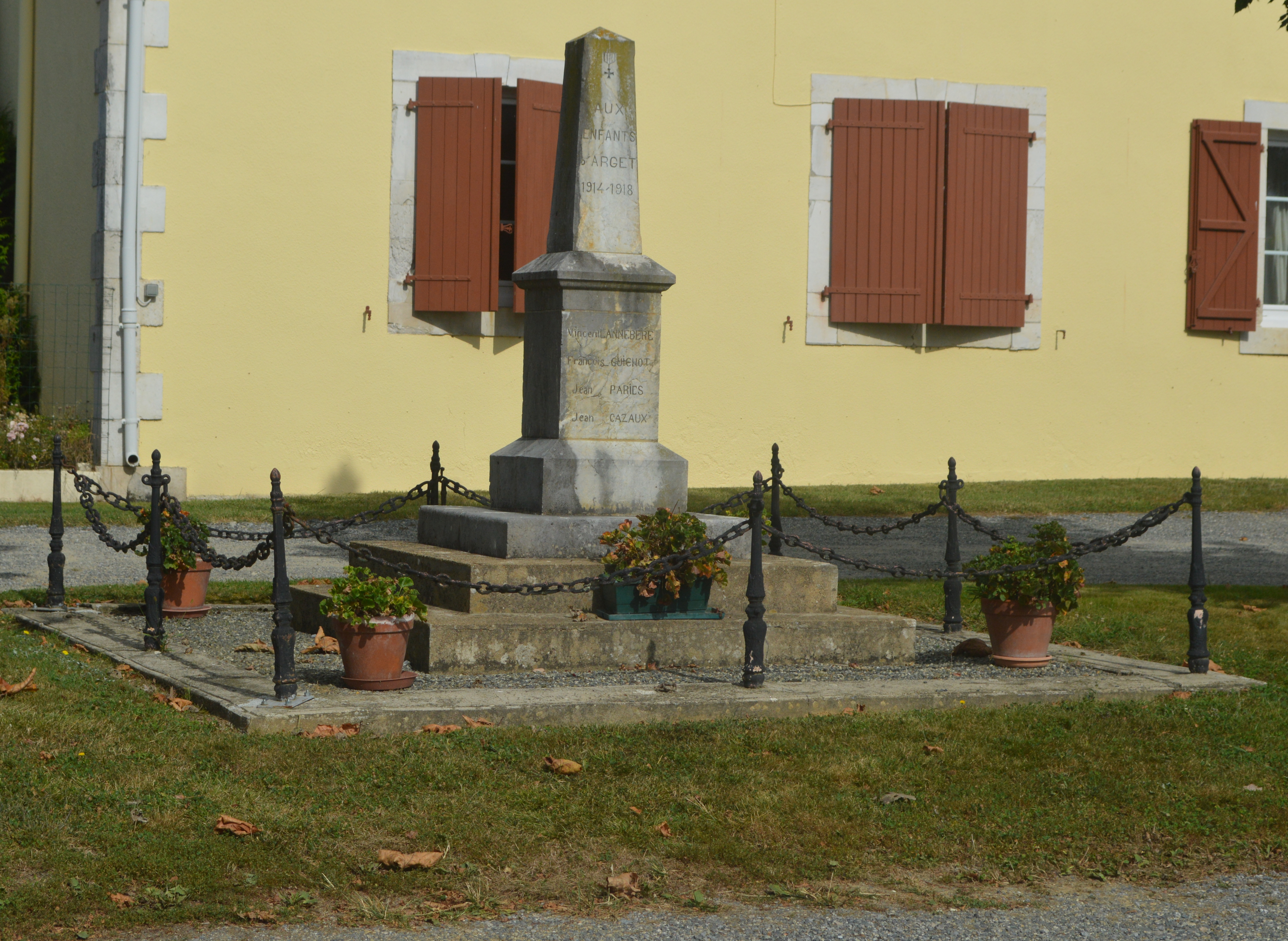
Arget War Memorial

=== Civil heritage ===
Arget has many farms that are registered as historical monuments:

- A Farmhouse at Hourcq (1832)
- The Menusé farm at Pourtique (1897)
- The Lajournade farm at Pourtique (18th century)
- The Pemeste farm at Hourcq (1797)
- Houses and Farms
- A Farmhouse at Boué (1905)
- A Farmhouse at Hibet (1871)
- A Farmhouse at Carrèrot (1898)
- A Farmhouse at Touroun (18th century)

=== Religious heritage ===
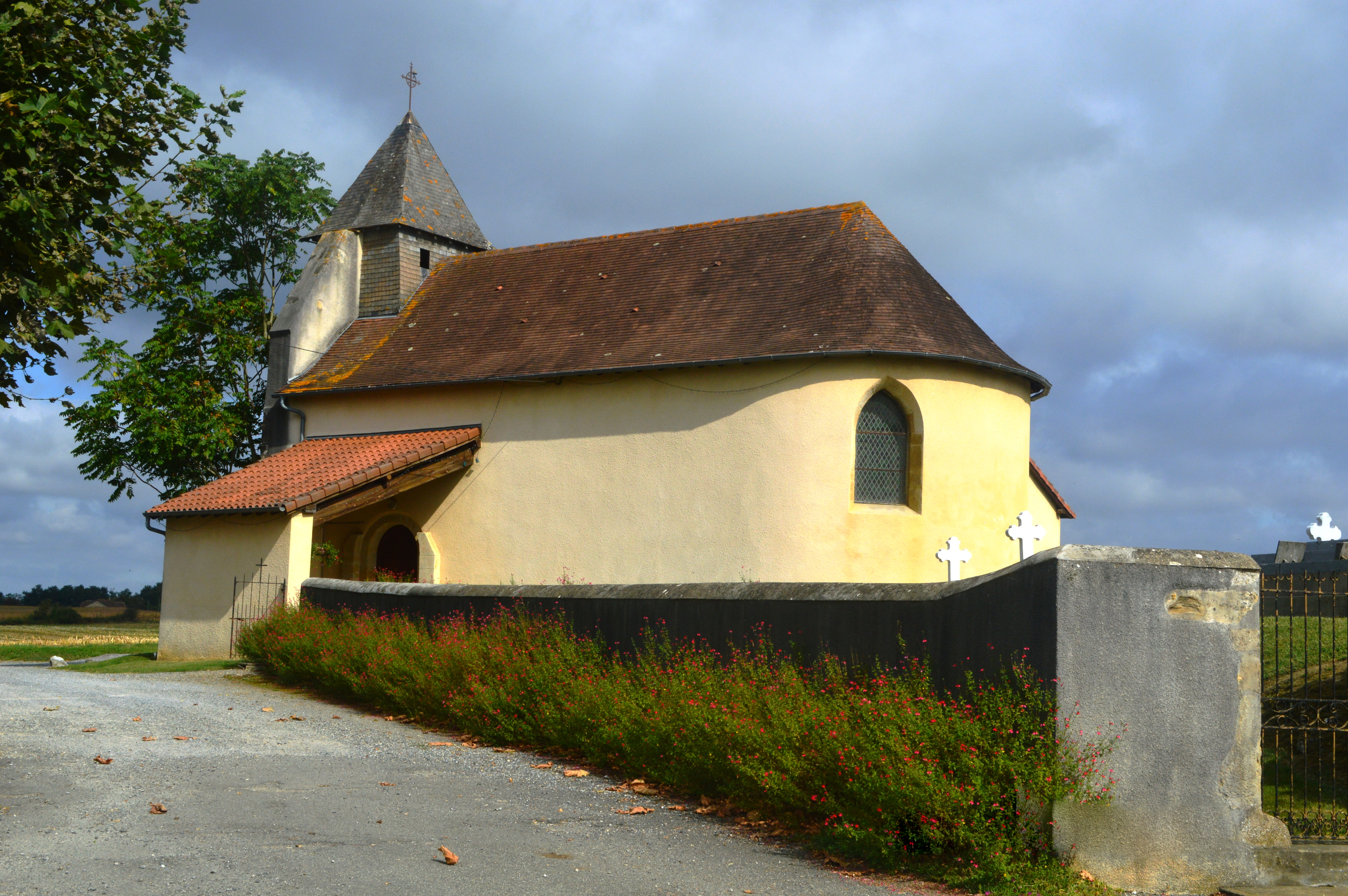
The Church of Notre Dame

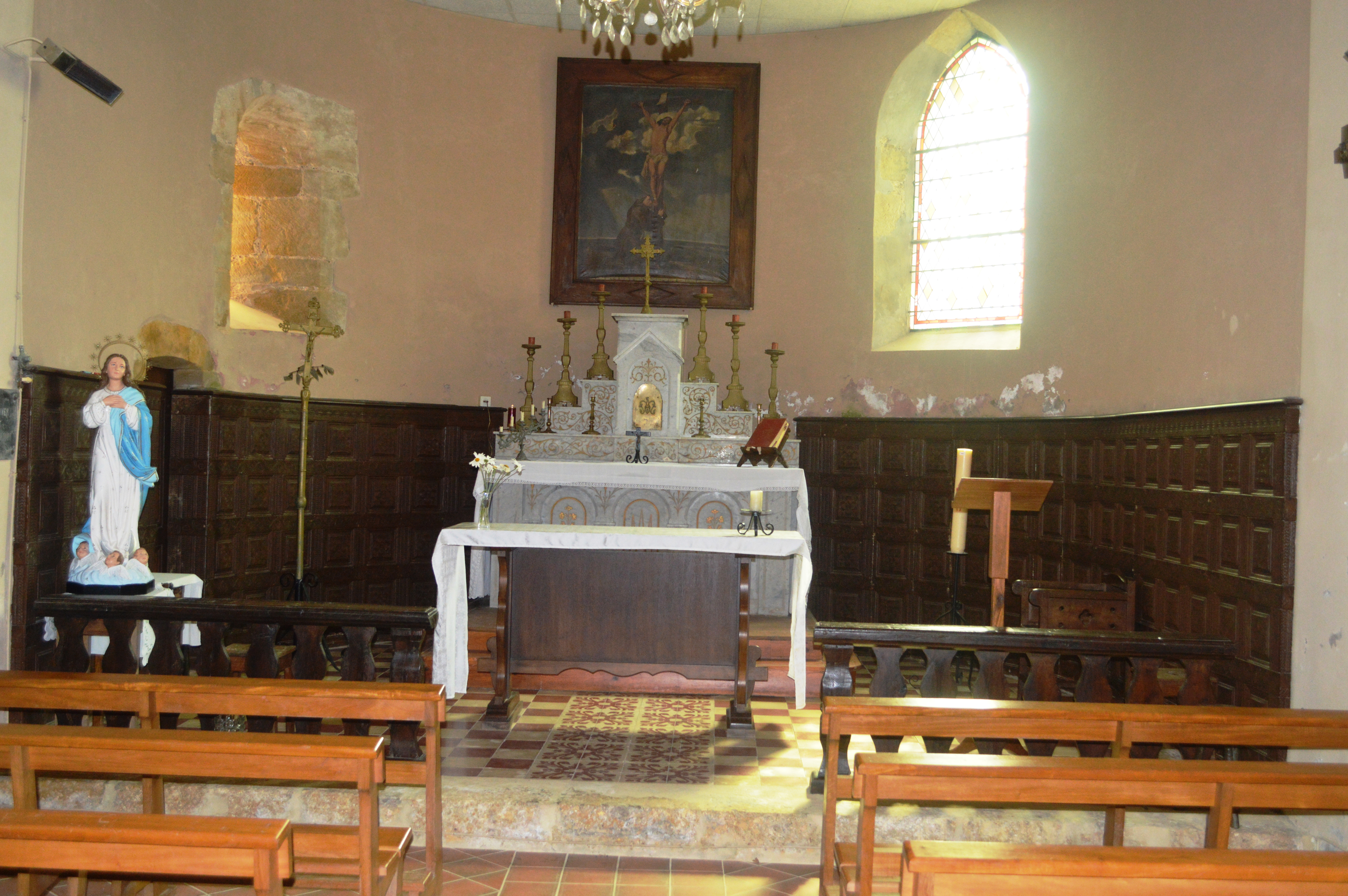
Main Altar

The Parish Church of Notre Dame (12th century) is registered as an historical monument. It contains several items that are registered as historical objects:

- The Furniture in the Church
- A Bronze Processional Cross (18th century)
- A Wooden Processional Cross (19th century)

== Notable people ==
- Annie Beustes, a New Caledonian politician born in Arget.

== See also ==
- Communes of the Pyrénées-Atlantiques department
