= Soyons unis, devenons frères =

Anthem of New Caledonia

English: Let us unite, let us become brothers
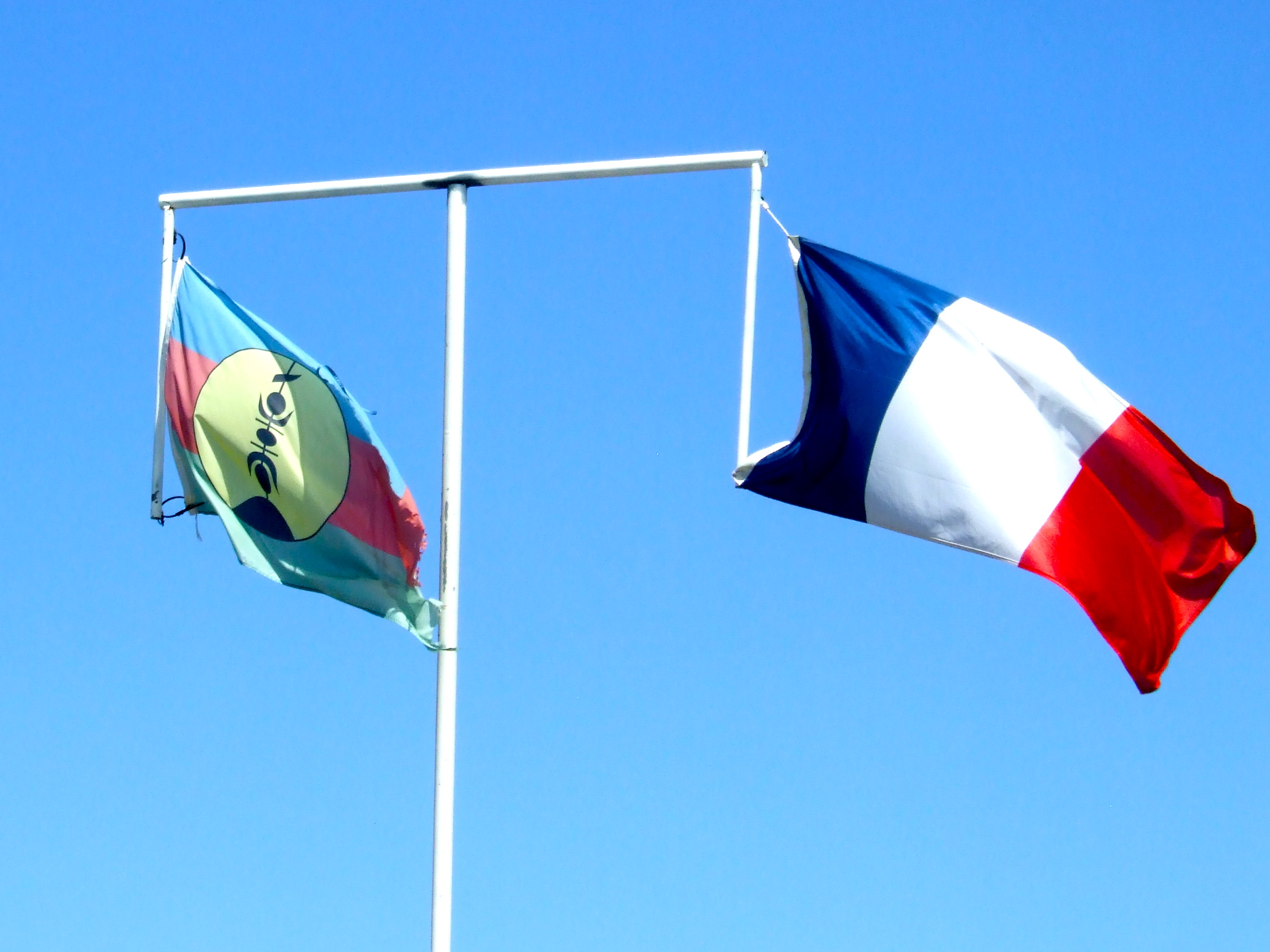
- Co-national anthem of New Caledonia
- Lyrics: Mélodia choir, 2008
- Music: Mélodia choir, 2008
- Adopted: 18 August 2010

Audio sample
- Choral rendition: file; help

"Soyons unis, devenons frères" ("Let us unite, let us become brothers") is the officially recognised anthem of New Caledonia. It was written by a group from the children's choir Mélodia in 2008 and officially adopted in 2010. It is not the national anthem of New Caledonia; as a special collectivity of France, the national anthem is the French national anthem, "La Marseillaise". During official ceremonies or sports events, "La Marseillaise" is performed first, followed by "Soyons unis, devenons frères".

== History ==
In 1998, the Nouméa Accord delegated greater autonomy to the territory and provided that its people would ultimately have the right to vote for full independence, in 2014 at the earliest and in 2018 at the latest. In the meantime, the Accord provided for the gradual recognition of five "identity signs": an anthem, a motto, local symbols on New Caledonian currency, a flag and a potential new name for the territory.

For the anthem, a competition was held by the Government of New Caledonia in 2008. The winning entry was written in January 2008 by seven New Caledonian children between the ages of 10 and 13 from the children's choral group Mélodia. It was performed for the first time on 26 June 2008.

On 18 August 2010, the Congress of New Caledonia officially adopted the anthem, alongside an official motto ("Terre de parole, terre de partage"; "Land of speech, land of sharing") and local symbols on New Caledonian currency. There was not yet agreement on recognition of a flag or a new name for the territory at the time. Congress deputies reserved the possibility of amending the lyrics of the anthem at a later date.

== Lyrics ==
In its long version, the anthem consists of three verses and a chorus. The verses are sung in French; the chorus is sung in Nengone then in French. There were initial plans to translate it eventually into other indigenous languages, which were carried out in the years following the anthem's creation. When only the short version of the anthem is sung, it consists of the third verse and the chorus (in Nengone and French).

Official lyrics

I
Ô terre sacrée de nos ancêtres,
Lumière éclairant nos vies,
Tu les invites à nous transmettre
Leurs rêves, leurs espoirs, leurs envies.
A l'abri des pins colonnaires,
A l'ombre des flamboyants,
Dans les vallées de tes rivières,
Leur cœur toujours est présent.

Refrain en nengone:
Hnore sa lu so ke'ej onom (Note: Sometimes written Hnore sa lu so keejo onome.)
Ha roi na ikuja ne enetho (Note: Sometimes written Ha roy na ikudja ne enetho.)
Guresalo ne era sese lo
Son ore nodej

Refrain en français:
Soyons unis, devenons frères,
Plus de violence ni de guerre.
Marchons confiants et solidaires,
Pour notre pays

II
Terre de parole et de partage
Tu proposes à l'étranger,
Dans la tribu ou le village,
Un endroit pour se reposer.
Tu veux loger la tolérance,
L'équité et le respect,
Au creux de tes bras immenses,
Ô Terre de liberté.

Refrain

III
Ô terre aux multiples visages,
Nord, Sud, Iles loyauté,
Tes trois provinces sont l'image
De ta grande diversité.
Nous tes enfants, tu nous rassembles,
Tempérant nos souvenirs.
D'une seule voix, chantons ensemble :
Terre, tu es notre avenir.

Refrain

Unofficial literal English translation

I
Oh sacred land of our ancestors,
The light that lights the way of our lives,
You invite them to pass on to us
Their dreams, their hopes, their desires.
In the shelter of the columnar pines,
In the shade of the flame trees,
In the valleys of your rivers,
Their heart is always there.

Chorus in Nengone:
Let us unite, let us become brothers,
No more violence, no more war.
Let us march, in confidence and solidarity,
For our country

Chorus in French:
Let us unite, let us become brothers,
No more violence, no more war.
Let us march, in confidence and solidarity,
For our country

II
Land of speech and sharing,
You offer to a stranger,
In the tribe or in the village,
A place to rest.
You want to house tolerance,
Equity and respect,
Enfold them with your giant arms,
Oh Land of freedom.

Chorus

III
Oh land of multiple faces,
North, South, Loyalty Islands,
Your three provinces are the image
Of your great diversity
We, your children, resemble you
Tempering our memory.
With a single voice, let us sing together:
Land, you are our future.

Chorus

IPA transcription of Nengone chorus (Note: See Help:IPA and Nengone language § Phonology.)

[n̥o.re sa ɭu so ke.ʔed͡ʒ o.nom]
[ha ro na i.ku.d͡ʒa ne he.ne.θo]
[gu re.sa.ɭo ne e.ra se.se ɭo]
[son o.re no.ded͡ʒ]

=== Original Nengone chorus ===
The following is the original chorus in Nengone written by the Mélodia choir in 2008.

Nengone original

Hnoresaluso ke'j onome
Ha deko ikuja ne enetho
Hue netitonelo kebo kaagu
Ri nodedrane

IPA transcription

[n̥o.re.sa.ɭu.so ked͡ʒ o.nom]
[ha de.ko i.ku.d͡ʒa ne he.ne.θo]
[w̥e ne.ti.to.ne.ɭo ke.bo kaː.gu]
[ri no.de.ɖ͡ʐan]

=== In other languages ===
On 24 September 2016, for New Caledonia Day (or Citizenship Day), the Mélodia choral performed a version of the anthem that included the chorus sung in several additional languages, including indigenous languages, Chinese, English, Réunion Creole, Standard German, Spanish and Russian.

Iaai chorus	IPA transcription (Note: See Help:IPA and Iaai language § Phonology.)
Khaca dhötin hnyatr me lakeiny hia Degec ut iwatretra me vëët Tha geju me ûhötrbeny ju ötin He ka tha op itin hnyei	[xa.cᶜ̧a ðø.t̪in̪ ɲ̊æʈᶳ me la.kei̯ɲ hi.æ] [d̪e.gecᶜ̧ ut̪ i.wæ.ʈᶳe.ʈᶳæ me vɤːt̪] [θæ ge.ɟᶨu me u.høʈᶳ.beɲ ɟᶨu ø.t̪in̪] [he kæ θæ ɔp i.t̪in̪ ɲ̊ei̯]
Ndrumbea chorus	IPA transcription (Note: See Help:IPA and Ndrumbea language § Phonology.)
Tấavúu-tầâ, úì mè kéè nrèmwà-a-tíi Kéè mwà cípóo béi mí vìee Về-tầâ trù-á-yu-á mí mwíre Pwḗ drúu re yề	[tã́ː.vúː.tã̀ː ú̯ì mè kéè ɳè.mʷà.a.tíː] [kéè mʷà ʈᶳí.póː bé.i mí vì̯eː] [vẽ̀.tã̀ː ʈᶳù.á.ju.á mí mʷ.í.ɽe] [pʷɛ́ ɖᶼúː ɽe jẽ̀]
Drehu chorus	IPA transcription (Note: See Help:IPA and Drehu language § Phonology.)
Casi ju së itre trejin Pëhë iwesitrë pëkö isi Ce tro jë së ngone la mejiune Kowe la nojë së	[t͡ʃɑ.si ðu sæ i.ʈe ʈe.ðin] [pæ.hæ i.we.si.ʈæ pæ.kø i.si] [t͡ʃe ʈo ðæ sæ ŋo.ne lɑ me.ði.un] [ko.we lɑ nø.ðæ sæ]
