= Pierre Ngaiohni =

New Caledonian politician

Vice President of the Government of New Caledonia
- Preceded by: Déwé Gorodey
- Succeeded by: Gilbert Tyuienon

Personal details
- Born: 1956 (age 68–69); Maré, Loyalty Islands Province, New Caledonia, France
- Occupation: Politician

Pierre Ngaiohni (born 1956) is a New Caledonian politician. He is a pro-independence ethnic Kanak. Ngaiohni was elected Vice President of New Caledonia on June 15, 2009, replacing Déwé Gorodey. Ngaiohni was succeeded by Gilbert Tyuienon in March 2011.

Ngaiohni was elected vice president five weeks after the 2009 New Caledonia legislative elections. His election was the third attempt to choose a new vice president. Ngaiohni's candidacy was successful because pro-independence parties were able to agree on one candidate. Ngaiohni's election cleared the way for the allocation of the other eleven government portfolios.

According to the 1998 Nouméa Accord, the Vice Presidency must be held by a pro-independence politician if the presidency is held by an anti-independence politician.
