= Jean-Louis d'Anglebermes =

New Caledonian politician

Vice President of the Government of New Caledonia
- In office 1 April 2015 – 5 July 2019
- Preceded by: Gilbert Tyuienon
- Succeeded by: Gilbert Tyuienon

Personal details
- Born: 17 July 1953 (age 71); Nouméa, New Caledonia, France
- Occupation: Politician

Jean-Louis d'Anglebermes (born 17 July 1953) is a New Caledonian politician. He is a pro-independence ethnic Kanak from Caledonian Union.

Since 2014, he has served as a member of the collegial government. D'Anglebermes was elected Vice President of New Caledonia on 1 April 2015 in the cabinet of Philippe Germain.

The first elections in which he participated were the provincial elections of 1995.
