= Isabelle Tyuienon =

Isabelle Tyuienon-Oujanou is an advocate for women's rights in New Caledonia.

Tyuienon was born and raised in Canala in the Northern Province of New Caledonia. In the early 1990s she led the creation of a women’s federation in her province, which called for more women in positions of responsibility and decision-making, the creation of a Ministry of Women’s Rights and a focus on gender equality in government. Around the same time she helped form an association to promote traditional Kanak crafts and to teach traditional handcraft skills to young girls.

In 2018 she was appointed president of an NGO called "Women Countries".
