= Labour Party (New Caledonia) =

Political party in New Caledonia

Labour Party Parti travailliste
- Leader: Marie-Pierre Goyetche
- Founded: November 18, 2007
- Headquarters: 2 rue Ali Raleb - Vallée du Tir; 98800 Nouméa
- Ideology: Separatism; Revolutionary socialism Alter-globalism; Anti-colonialism; Anti-capitalism; Eco-socialism; Anti-imperialism; Left-wing nationalism
- Political position: Far-left
- Colours: Red
- Seats in the Congress: 0 / 54
- Seats in the Loyalty Islands Province: 0 / 14

The Labour Party (French: Parti travailliste, PT) is a New Caledonian political party established on 18 November 2007. It is radically pro-independence and backed by the trade union Union of Kanak and Exploited Workers (USTKE). It is considered close to the French alterglobalization movement led by José Bové.

== Elections ==
The PT supported two candidates in the 2007 French legislative election. Louis Kotra Uregei obtained 5.45% in New Caledonia's 1st constituency and François-Xavier Apock obtained 6.20% in New Caledonia's 2nd constituency.

In the legislative election of May 10, 2009, it won 7.97% of the vote and 3 seats in the Congress of New Caledonia. It won 11.97% in the North Province and 20.06% in the Loyalty Islands.
