= New Caledonian =

New Caledonian may refer to:

- Something of, from, or related to New Caledonia, an overseas territory of France, located in the region of Melanesia in the southwest Pacific
- A person from New Caledonia, or of New Caledonian descent. For information about the New Caledonian people, see Demographics of New Caledonia and Culture of New Caledonia. For specific persons, see List of New Caledonians.
- Note that there is no language called "New Caledonian". See Languages of New Caledonia.
