= Louis Kotra Uregei =

New Caledonian politician (1951–2022)

Louis Kotra Uregei (4 February 1951 – 20 October 2022) was a New Caledonian syndicalist and politician.

Uregei was born in Nouméa on 4 February 1951. He was a member of the Labour Party, and was a Kanak who supported independence from France.

Uregei died on 20 October 2022, at the age of 71.
