= Marie-Noëlle Thémereau =

New Caledonian former president

3rd President of New Caledonia
- In office 10 July 2004 – 7 August 2007
- Vice President: Déwé Gorodey
- Preceded by: Pierre Frogier
- Succeeded by: Harold Martin

Personal details
- Born: 1950 (age 75–76)
- Party: Future Together

Marie-Noëlle Thémereau (born 1950) is a French New Caledonian politician who served as the former president of the government of New Caledonia, an overseas territory of France in the Pacific Ocean about 1,210 km (750 mi) east of Australia. She has been a member of the loyalist (i.e. anti-independence) Future Together party ("Avenir ensemble").

== Biography ==
Marie-Noëlle Thémereau is the daughter of Claude Billet, a native of Corrèze and veteran of Free France who arrived in New Caledonia in 1949 as a worker on the ore carriers of Société Le Nickel (SLN) and general secretary from 1952 of the trade union of this company. He brought his family shortly after settling in and Marie-Noëlle was brought up in the capital city of Nouméa.

=== Civil servant ===
Holder of a master's degree in law specializing in labor and social security law from the University of Bordeaux IV, she first made a career in public administration. She thus stood out at the head of the Department of Studies, Legislation and Litigation, then that of the finances of the New Caledonia Territory from 1986 to 1988. She was mainly responsible for implementing the three Debré laws and developing vocational education.

Separately, she then founded a real estate agency, the General Agency, in association with politician Pierre Frogier that they continue to manage together although they have become adversaries in politics.

=== Politician ===
In 1989, she was elected to the congress of New Caledonia and to the South Province on the RPCR list, re-elected in 1995 and 1999. She held the position of second vice-president of the South Province from 1990 to 1999 and first vice-president of the congress from 1999 to 2001, but in 2001 she resigned.

In 2004, she led the list of her party "Avenir Ensemble" for the provincial elections. On 29 June 2004, Thémereau was elected to the presidency of the fifth government of New Caledonia resulting from the Nouméa Accords. As such she became head of the local government by the Congress of New Caledonia in 2004 after defeating the long-time ruling loyalist party RPCR (Rally for Caledonia in the Republic) and its chief Jacques Lafleur. Thémereau resigned on July 24, 2007 after giving advance warning that she would do so. She was succeeded in the Congress by Pascal Vittori.
