= Oceanian Democratic Rally =

Political party in New Caledonia

Oceanian Democratic Rally Rassemblement démocratique océanien
- Leader: Aloïsio Sako
- Founded: 1994
- Headquarters: Nouméa
- Ideology: Separatism; Melanesian socialism Communitarianism
- National affiliation: None, close to the Socialist Party
- Colours: Red
- Seats in the Congress: 1
- Seats in the South Province: 1
- Seats in the North Province: 0
- Seats in the Loyalty Islands Province: 0

Website
- Official website archived

The Oceanian Democratic Rally (French: Rassemblement démocratique océanien, RDO) is a leftist, pro-independence, militant political party in New Caledonia. It is a component of the National Union for Independence, which in turn is one of the two components of the Kanak and Socialist National Liberation Front (FLNKS).

== History ==
The party was founded in either 1992 of 1994 by local Polynesian Wallisians and Futunians favourable to the independence of New Caledonia from France. Aloïsio Sako, who had served as President of the Polynesian-based Oceanian Union and was a police officer, was removed from office by the then-Minister of the Interior Charles Pasqua.

The party holds one seat in the Congress of New Caledonia representing the South Province, which has a sizeable Polynesian population.
