= Album des pavillons =

Flag book published by French SHOM

Album des pavillons, short for the Album des pavillons nationaux et des marques distinctives (lit. 'Album of national flags and distinctive emblems'), is a flag book published by the French Naval Hydrographic and Oceanographic Service (SHOM). The latest edition was published on March 25, 2025. The contents of the book contain flags, ensigns and standards of countries, including construction sheets and Pantone, CMYK and RGB colors used to reproduce the flags.

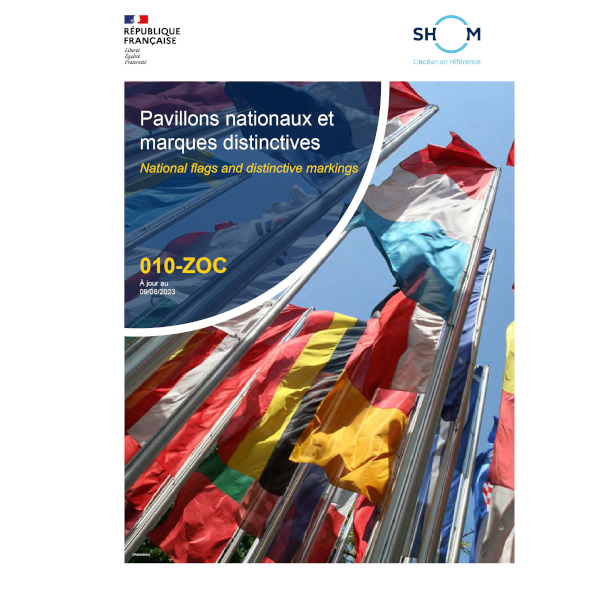
