= History of the Jews in New Caledonia =

New Caledoniann Jews Juifs de Nouvelle-Calédonie יהודים קלדוניים חדשים
Total population
- 50 (2013)

Regions with significant populations
- Nouméa

Languages
- French, Hebrew, Tahitian

Religion
- Judaism

The history of the Jews in New Caledonia dates back to 1987, when the Jewish community was first established. The Jewish community numbers around 50 people, most of whom are located in Nouméa. In Nouméa there is a synagogue and a Jewish community center, the Association Culturelle Israelite de Nouvelle Caledonie. Almost all of the Jews in New Caledonia are Sephardi Jews of French descent. Most work in business and state government.

Kosher food is imported from Australia.

In 2017, a Chabad house opened in Nouméa. New Caledonia had a Jewish population of around 250 in 2017.
