= Future Together =

Future Together L'Avenir Ensemble
- Leader: Harold Martin
- Founded: 2004
- Dissolved: 2017
- Succeeded by: Caledonian Republicans
- Headquarters: 2 bis, Boulevard Vauban - Centre Ville; 98800 Nouméa
- Ideology: Anti-separatism; Centrism; Christian democracy Liberalism; Gaullism (minority)
- National affiliation: Union for a Popular Movement; MoDem; New Centre
- Colours: Orange

Website
- www.avenirensemble.nc

Future Together (French: l'Avenir Ensemble, pronounced [lav(ə)niʁ ɑ̃sɑ̃bl]) was a center-right political party in New Caledonia supporting the maintenance of political and administrative ties with France.

The name l'Avenir Ensemble reflects the party's desire to unite New Caledonians of all ethnic groups (White Europeans, Melanesian Kanaks, Polynesian immigrants, etc.) into a shared future, rejecting the ethnic oppositions of the hitherto dominant parties of New Caledonia (White anti-independence parties vs. Kanak pro-independence parties). L'Avenir Ensemble believes in a multi-ethnic and multi-cultural future for New Caledonia.

== History ==
The party's predecessor, A New Caledonia for All (Une Nouvelle-Calédonie pour Tous, UNCT) or Alliance (after 1998) was founded in 1995 by Didier Leroux, a former member of the dominant anti-nationalist Rally for Caledonia in the Republic (RPCR). Leroux was an early opponent of Jacques Lafleur within the RPCR. Leroux led the NO campaign in the Nouméa Accord referendum in 1998. Despite Leroux being François Bayrou's representative on the island and a member of Bayrou's Union for French Democracy (and now MoDem), a number of members of the original Alliance are members of the Union for a Popular Movement.

The then-dominant loyalist party, the RPCR was weakened in 2003 and 2004 by a series of dissidents, who opposed Jacques Lafleur's domination of the RPCR. These dissidents included Marie-Noëlle Thémereau, who had left the RPCR in 2001; Harold Martin, once Lafleur's dauphin but excluded in 2003 for running a dissident list in the 2001 election; and Philippe Gomès, a friend of Martin. These dissidents formed a party called Future Together.

In the 2004 provincial elections, the party shocked observers by winning as many seats as the RPCR (16 seats nationally, though it polled slightly fewer votes than the RPCR). As a result, Thémereau (and later Martin) became President of the Government of New Caledonia. Gomès became President of the loyalist stronghold, the South Province. In the South, the party had polled more votes than the RPCR, despite the province being considered the RPCR's stronghold on the island.

The party split in 2008. This split started in the 2007 legislative election, when Gomès ran in New Caledonia's 1st constituency despite Didier Leroux being supposed to run. Though both ran, and both polled 14%, they got third and fourth leaving the RPCR candidate Gaël Yanno against the candidate of the nationalist FLNKS, which Yanno easily defeated. Martin was also defeated running the New Caledonia's 2nd constituency. Poor results in the 2008 local elections, including the capital, Nouméa, precipitated an open split between Gomès on one side and Martin-Leroux on the other. In 2008, Gomès and 12 Future Together Congressmen and women (including Thémereau) formed Caledonia Together.

In the 2009 provincial elections, the party, associated with the Movement for Diversity of senator Simon Loueckhote, placed third winning (behind the winners, the RPCR, and Caledonia Together) 11.71% and only 6 seats (8 including the party's smaller allies).
