= Harold Martin (New Caledonian politician) =

New Caledonian politician

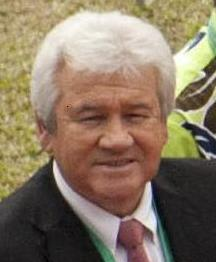
- Harold Martin in 2012.

President of the Government of New Caledonia
- In office 11 March 2011 – 5 June 2014
- Vice President: Gilbert Tyuienon
- Preceded by: Philippe Gomès
- Succeeded by: Cynthia Ligeard
- In office 7 August 2007 – 5 June 2009
- Vice President: Annie Beustes; Déwé Gorodey
- Preceded by: Marie-Noëlle Thémereau
- Succeeded by: Philippe Gomès

Personal details
- Born: 6 April 1954 (age 72) Nouméa, New Caledonia
- Party: L'Avenir Ensemble
- Spouse: Hélène Messud

Harold Martin (born 6 April 1954, Nouméa, New Caledonia) is a French politician. He served twice as President of the Government of New Caledonia (from 7 August 2007 to 10 May 2009 and again from 3 March 2011 to 5 June 2014) and three times as President of the Congress of New Caledonia between 1997 and 2011 (most recently from 22 May 2009 to 3 March 2011). Former student as a site manager in the ESTP, Martin replaced Marie-Noëlle Thémereau in 2007 as the leader of the ruling Future Together party after the party suffered an electoral setback to choose the territory's two members of the French assembly.

Coming from one of the oldest families of European origin, Martin is descended from a nephew of James Paddon, the British adventurer widely credited as having been the first European settler on the island, before the French annexation in 1853.

Further, he directs an agricultural society. Thus, he has been president of the Council on the Regulation and Establishment of Agricultural Prices (ERPA) in 1991, 1993, and from 1994 to 1995.
