= 2009 New Caledonian legislative election =

- 10 May 2009
- All 54 seats in Congress; 28 seats needed for a majority
Party	Leader	Vote %	Seats	+/–
The Rally–UMP		20.60	13	−3
Ensemble	Philippe Gomès	16.83	10	New
UC	Charles Pidjot	11.65	8	+1
UNI–FLNKS		10.52	8	0
AE–LMD		10.25	6	−10
PT		7.97	3	New
FLNKS		5.53	3	+3
RPC		4.46	2	New
LKS		1.92	1	0
This lists parties that won seats. See the complete results below.
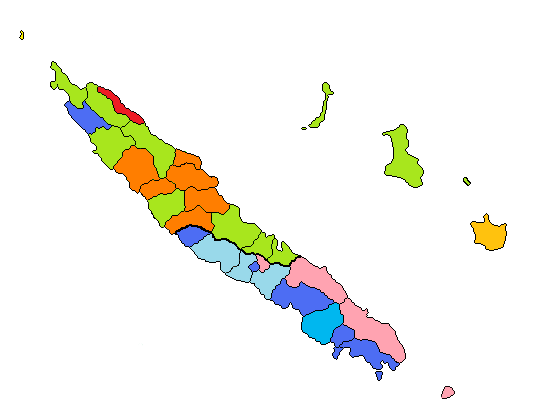
Results by province

Legislative elections were held in New Caledonia on 10 May 2009. Voters elected 76 members of the three provincial assemblies, of whom 54 were also to become members of the territorial Congress.

The Labour Party, which had been founded in 2007 as the political arm of the pro-independence Union of Kanaky Workers and the Exploited, contested the elections for the first time and hoped to gain 12,000 votes and a seat. Due to splits in the two main parties of the anti-independence front, the Rally–UMP and Future Together (from which Caledonia Together split off in October 2008), the main pro-independence party, the Kanak and Socialist National Liberation Front (FLNKS), hoped to become the largest party in the elections.

== Campaign ==
The newly elected Congress was to decide how to implement the autonomy provisions of the Noumea Accord of 1998. Apart from the island's political future, the economy and New Caledonia's high cost of living were the main issue in the election campaign.

== Results ==
Party	Votes	%	Seats	
Party	Votes	%	Provincial assemblies	Congress
The Rally–UMP	19,888	20.60	16	13
Caledonia Together	16,253	16.83	12	10
Caledonian Union	11,247	11.65	14	8
UNI–FLNKS	10,162	10.52	13	8
Future Together–Movement for Diversity	9,894	10.25	8	6
Labour Party	7,692	7.97	5	3
Kanak and Socialist National Liberation Front	5,342	5.53	4	3
Rally for Caledonia	4,304	4.46	2	2
Civic Overture	2,974	3.08	0	0
National Front	2,591	2.68	0	0
Kanak Socialist Liberation–Indigenous Dynamics	1,852	1.92	2	1
Future Together	1,414	1.46	0	0
Generation Common Destiny	1,215	1.26	0	0
Federation of Pro-Independence Co-operation Committees	605	0.63	0	0
Movement for Diversity	516	0.53	0	0
Oceanian Rally in a Plural Caledonia	443	0.46	0	0
Future Together–Caledonia Together–Rally for Caledonia	166	0.17	0	0
Total	96,558	100.00	76	54
Valid votes	96,558	98.01		
Invalid/blank votes	1,962	1.99		
Total votes	98,520	100.00		
Registered voters/turnout	135,932	72.48		

=== By bloc ===
Party	Votes	%	Seats			
Party	Votes	%	Provincial assemblies	+/–	Congress	+/–
Loyalists; LR, CE, AE, LMD, RPC, FN, ROCP	55,469	57.45	38	–8	31	–5
Separatists; UC, UNI, FLNKS, PT, LKS, FCCI	36,900	38.22	38	+8	23	+5
Neutral; OC, GDC	4,189	4.34	0	0	0	0
Total	96,558	100.00	76	0	54	0
Valid votes	96,558	98.01				
Invalid/blank votes	1,962	1.99				
Total votes	98,520	100.00				
Registered voters/turnout	135,932	72.48				
