= Jean Lèques =

New Caledonian politician (1931–2022)

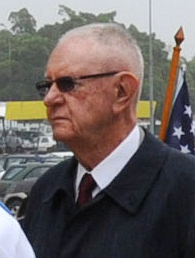
- Jean Lèques in 2009

Mayor of Nouméa
- In office 24 January 1986 – 5 April 2014
- Preceded by: Roger Laroque
- Succeeded by: Sonia Lagarde

President of the Government of New Caledonia
- In office 28 May 1999 – 5 April 2001
- Vice President: Léopold Jorédié
- Preceded by: Office established
- Succeeded by: Pierre Frogier

Personal details
- Born: 31 August 1931 Nouméa, New Caledonia
- Died: 1 June 2022 (aged 90) Nouméa, France
- Party: The Rally–UMP
- Spouse: Évelyne Lèques
- Education: University of Grenoble

Jean Lèques (31 August 1931 – 1 June 2022) was a New Caledonian politician. He served as mayor of Nouméa from 1986 to 2014; between 1999 and 2001 he was the first sitting president of the government of New Caledonia under the Organic Law no. 99-209.
