= Gilbert Tyuienon =

New Caledonian politician

Vice President of the Government of New Caledonia
- In office 9 July 2019 – 22 July 2021
- President: Thierry Santa
- Preceded by: Jean-Louis d'Anglebermes
- Succeeded by: Isabelle Champmoreau
- In office 3 March 2011 – 5 June 2014
- President: Harold Martin
- Preceded by: Pierre Ngaiohni
- Succeeded by: Vacant

Mayor of Canala
- Incumbent
- Assumed office 16 March 2001
- Preceded by: Gustave Kataoui

Personal details
- Born: 28 March 1958 (age 68) Canala, New Caledonia
- Party: Caledonian Union

Gilbert Tyuiénon (born 28 March 1958) is a New Caledonian politician. He is a pro-independence ethnic Kanak. Tyuiénon-was elected Vice President of New Caledonia on 11 March 2011 in the collegial cabinet of Harold Martin and held that position until 5 June 2014. As of 2018, he continues to be a member of the collegial government.

He was reelected as Vice President of New Caledonia on 9 July 2019 in the cabinet of Thierry Santa. He left office on 22 July 2021.

Tyuiénon was elected as mayor of Canala in 2001 as candidate of Caledonian Union.
