= Emblem of New Caledonia =

- Armiger: New Caledonia
- Shield: A flèche faîtière thrust through tutut shells, and an Araucaria columnaris, all surmounted by the shell of a Nautilus

The unofficial emblem of New Caledonia consists of a nautilus shell in the foreground; the 2 symbols behind are (from left to right) a flèche faîtière, a kind of arrow which adorns the roofs of Kanak houses, thrust through tutut shells, and an Araucaria columnaris (an endemic tall pine).

== Gallery ==
A French tricolour defaced with New Caledonia's emblem (unofficial).

== See also ==
- Flag of New Caledonia
