= Pierre Frogier =

French politician

Senator for New Caledonia
- Incumbent
- Assumed office 1 October 2011

President of the Assembly of South Province
- In office 15 May 2009 – 20 September 2012
- Preceded by: Philippe Gomès
- Succeeded by: Cynthia Ligeard

Member of the National Assembly for New Caledonia's 2nd constituency
- In office 27 November 1996 – 1 October 2011
- Preceded by: Maurice Nénou
- Succeeded by: Philippe Gomès

President of the Congress of New Caledonia
- In office 31 July 2007 – 10 May 2009
- Preceded by: Harold Martin
- Succeeded by: Harold Martin
- In office 31 July 1995 – 16 July 1997
- Preceded by: Simon Loueckhote
- Succeeded by: Harold Martin

President of the Government of New Caledonia
- In office 5 April 2001 – 10 July 2004
- Vice President: Déwé Gorodey
- Preceded by: Jean Lèques
- Succeeded by: Marie-Noëlle Thémereau

Mayor of Le Mont-Dore
- In office 25 June 1987 – 18 March 2001
- Preceded by: Victorin Boewa
- Succeeded by: Réginald Bernut

Personal details
- Born: 16 November 1950 (age 75) Nouméa, New Caledonia
- Party: The Rally–UMP
- Spouse: Annick Morault

Pierre Frogier (born 16 November 1950, Nouméa, New Caledonia) is a French politician, who was President of the Government of New Caledonia from 2001 to 2004. He has been French senator for New Caledonia since 2011, and was member of the National Assembly of France from 1996 to 2011. He served as President of the Congress of New Caledonia from 1995 to 1997.

He was born in Nouméa.

He was elected President of that collectivity by the territorial Congress (Congrès du territoire) on 5 April 2001, reelected in November 2002 when the government collapsed following the resignation of a minister, and left office on 10 June 2004, when a new government was elected after his party, the anti-independence The Rally–UMP, lost parliamentary elections.

When the new government collapsed, Frogier ran for president in elections two weeks later, on 24 June 2004, in which he was defeated, received 4 of the 11 votes in Congress.

He was elected second time as President of the Congress of New Caledonia from 2007 to 2009.
