= Simon Loueckhote =

French politician

Senator for New Caledonia
- In office 2 October 1992 – 30 September 2011
- Preceded by: Dick Ukeiwé
- Succeeded by: Hilarion Vendégou; Pierre Frogier

Personal details
- Born: 7 May 1957 (age 69)

Simon Loueckhote (born 7 May 1957) is a French politician and a former member of the Senate of France, representing the island of New Caledonia. He is a member of the Union for a Popular Movement.

He served as President of the Congress of New Caledonia from 1989 to 1995, and from 1998 to 2004.

Loueckhote served as the sole member from New Caledonia to the French Senate from 1992 until 2011. Loueckhote announced in September 2011 that he would not seek re-election to the Senate after the Union for a Popular Movement political party threw its support to two other candidates, Pierre Frogier and Hilarion Vendegou, in June.

In 2011, New Caledonia's representation in the Senate of France was increased to two members as part of the Senate's enlargement. An electoral college held on 24 September 2011, will elect the two new Senators, who will succeed Loueckhote.
