= Jacques Lafleur =

New Caledonia politician

Jacques Lafleur (French pronunciation: [ʒak laflœʁ]; 20 November 1932 – 4 December 2010) was a French politician born in Nouméa, New Caledonia, France.

Lafleur was a leader of one of the two anti-independence parties in New Caledonia, the RPCR (Rally for Caledonia in the Republic). He was a signatory to the Matignon Accords in 1988 and the Nouméa Accord in 1998. He was elected deputy on 16 June 2002, for the 12th session of the legislature (2002–2007), representing the 1st district in New Caledonia, but lost his hold on power as a result of the elections of 9 May 2004, which propelled a new party, named "Future Together" (Avenir Ensemble), into control of government in South Province.

== Conviction for slander ==
Lafleur, whose fortune stemmed partly from mining interests, reportedly slandered and intimidated Goldman Environmental Prize winner Bruno Van Peteghem over Van Peteghem's efforts to protect the ecology of New Caledonia.

== Offices held ==
- 1978–2007 : Deputy
- 7 March 1983 – 3 June 1997 : Nouméa Municipal Council Member (New Caledonia)
- 28 November 1984 – 29 September 1985 : New Caledonia Territorial Assembly Member
- 24 April 1988 – 11 June 1989 : President of the Council for the Southern Region of New Caledonia
- 11 June 1989 – 8 May 1999 : President of the Assembly for the Southern Region of New Caledonia
- 1999–2004 : Président of the South Province
