= The Rally (New Caledonia) =

The Rally Le Rassemblement
- President: Alcide Ponga
- General Secretary: Didier-Jean Leroux
- Founded: 1977 (RPC); 1978 (RPCR); 2004 (Rally-UMP); 2014 (The Rally)
- Headquarters: 13, Rue Sébastopol - Centre Ville - 98800 Nouméa
- Ideology: Anti-separatism; Gaullism; Conservatism; Liberal conservatism Christian democracy
- Political position: Centre-right to right-wing
- European affiliation: European People's Party
- International affiliation: Centrist Democrat International
- Colours: Red, blue
- Seats in the National Assembly: 0 / 2 (0%)
- Seats in the Senate: 1 / 2 (50%)
- Seats in the Congress: 6 / 54 (11%)
- Seats in the South Province: 5 / 40 (13%)
- Seats in the North Province: 2 / 40 (5%)
- Seats in the Loyalty Islands Province: 0 / 14 (0%)

Website
- www.rassemblement.nc

The Rally (French: Le Rassemblement; until 2004 Rally for Caledonia in the Republic, French: Rassemblement pour une Calédonie dans la République; from 2004 to 2014 Rally–UMP) is a conservative political party in New Caledonia. The Rally is a loyalist party, supportive of the French status of the region and opposed to the independence of New Caledonia. It is affiliated with the Les Republicains party in mainland France. It is led by Alcide Ponga since April 2024 and in government since January 2025.

== History ==
In 1977, which saw the start of an outright nationalist movement on the left, anti-nationalist (loyalist) Caldoche leader Jacques Lafleur founded the Rally for Caledonia (RPC) which became the Rally for Caledonia in the Republic (RPCR) in 1978 following its affiliation with the Rally for the Republic (RPR) in France. The RPCR was originally a big tent for a large majority of loyalists, whether they were liberals or close supporters of Jacques Chirac (such as Lafleur). However, the first cracks in the RPCR appeared in 1995, when Lafleur broke his historical friendship with Chirac to endorse Balladur in the 1995 presidential election in France. Didier Leroux, the strongman of the local managerial trade union and a close supporter of Jacques Chirac, left the RPCR to found a party named A New Caledonia for All. However, the RPCR remained, by far, the largest loyalist party in the 1994 and 1999 elections. It became the Rassemblement-UMP after the creation of the Union for a Popular Movement in France in 2002, but kept the RPCR acronym.

However, the RPCR started massively cracking ahead of the 2004 elections. In 2004, a group of RPCR dissidents who opposed Lafleur's authoritarian leadership formed the Future Together party. The new party included Marie-Noëlle Thémereau, who had left the RPCR in 2001 and supported Lionel Jospin in the 2002 French presidential election; Harold Martin, Lafleur's heir apparent but excluded in 2003 for running a dissident list in the 2001 local elections; and Philippe Gomès, a friend of Martin.

In the 2004 election, the RPCR received its worst result to date, obtaining 24.43% and only 16 Congressmen. Future Together won 22.69% and 16 seats, but it won more votes than the RPCR in the loyalist stronghold of South Province. Gomès became Provincial President, and Harold Martin became President of the Government of New Caledonia.

In 2005, Lafleur announced his intentions to step down in favour of Pierre Frogier, who represented New Caledonia's 2nd constituency and was a close supporter of the President of the UMP in France, soon-to-be-President Nicolas Sarkozy. Frogier was seen as Lafleur's chosen successor. However, he reneged on this decision and ran against Frogier for the RPCR leadership at the party congress. Frogier defeated Lafleur by a large margin, and Lafleur left the RPCR to form the Rally for Caledonia (RPC).

Despite its decline, the RPCR held both of New Caledonia's seats in the French National Assembly in the 2007 elections. In the 1st constituency, representing the capital city of Nouméa, Gaël Yanno defeated a Kanak nationalist but most notably the incumbent, Jacques Lafleur, who had won the seat since 1986.

In the 2009 election, the RPCR obtained a lower result than in 2004, despite the division in Future Together. The RPCR obtained only 20.3% and a mere 13 Congressmen. However, the RPCR regained its status as largest party in New Caledonia and achieved first place in the South Province.
