= 2026 New Caledonian legislative election =

- 28 June 2026
- All 54 seats in the Congress; 28 seats needed for a majority
- Turnout: 63.71% (▼2.76pp)
Party	Leader	Vote %	Seats	+/–
Les Loyalistes	Sonia Backès	38.05	24	+11
UC–FLNKS	Pierre-Chanel Tutugoro	11.93	10	+1
FLNKS	Christian Tein	10.66	6	0
UNI	Jean-Pierre Djaïwé	10.56	6	−3
EO	Milakulo Tukumuli	6.97	4	+1
Nation Autochtone	Nidoïsh Naisseline	3.20	3	+2
Palika Îles	Paul Néaoutyine	2.06	1	New
This lists parties that won seats. See the complete results below.
Results by province and bloc
President of the Government before	President of the Government after
Alcide Ponga; The Rally	Milakulo Tukumuli; EO

Legislative elections were held in New Caledonia on 28 June 2026 to elect members of the Congress of New Caledonia. The elections had previously been scheduled to be held on 15 December 2024 but were postponed by a year after unrest and then postponed again following the Bougival Accord.

While the autonomist and loyalist bloc, led by Sonia Backès and The Loyalists, received the most votes, the separatist bloc, led by Pierre-Chanel Tutugoro and the alliance of the Caledonian Union and the Kanak and Socialist National Liberation Front (FLNKS), retained the most seats. Neutral parties retained the balance of power. Kingmaker candidate Milakulo Tukumuli of the centrist Oceanian Awakening was elected as the new President. Tukumuli is the first person of Wallisian descent to hold the office.

== Background ==
An independence referendum was held in New Caledonia, a French territory in the South Pacific, on 12 December 2021. The vote was the third and final one to be held under the terms of the Nouméa Accord, following votes in 2018 and 2020. As a result of the referendum taking place amid a boycott from the independence parties, the results were extremely lopsided in favor of status quo: voters overwhelmingly rejected independence, with 96% voting against independence and 4% in favour (compared to a 57% and 53% against independence in 2018 and 2020). French President Emmanuel Macron celebrated the results of the referendum, adding that France "is more beautiful because New Caledonia has decided to stay part of it."

While the Kanak independence movement continues to demand full self-determination, many French officials see extending voting rights as essential for democratic fairness in the territory. The adoption of the voter list bill in May 2024 by the French parliament which would allow French citizens residing in New Caledonia for at least ten years to take part in local elections, led to mass riots by pro-independence groups that turned violent, prompting French president Emmanuel Macron to declare a state of emergency and fly thousands of police and army reinforcements to the faraway territory. In October 2024, then-French Prime Minister Michel Barnier scrapped the bill, citing the need to restore calm and telling the National Assembly that "avoiding further unrest" was a priority.

On 16 January 2025, Alcide Ponga was sworn in as President of the Government of New Caledonia, forming a new government following the collapse of the pro-independence government led by Louis Mapou. His leadership has been described as bringing stability following the 2024 unrest and a continuation for New Caledonia to remain within the French Republic.

On 12 July 2025, the Ministry of the Overseas, and both pro and anti-independence signed the Bougival Accord, delaying the elections until 2026.

== Electoral system ==
Voters elect 76 members to the assemblies of the three provinces of New Caledonia (40 for South Province, 22 for North Province, and 14 for the Loyalty Islands Province). In turn, 54 also become members of the Congress of New Caledonia (32 from South Province, 15 from North Province, and 7 from Loyalty Islands Province).

The elections are held under party-list proportional representation using a 5% electoral threshold and the highest averages method to allocate seats. The elections used a restricted roll, which restricts voting depending on how long someone has lived in New Caledonia. Only persons residing in New Caledonia since at least 8 November 1998 (and their children, once they reach the age of majority) are able to vote.

== Results ==
Graph of the party split among 54 seats.
Party	Votes	%	+/–	Seats			
Party	Votes	%	+/–	Provincial assemblies	+/–	Congress	+/–
Les Loyalistes	45,825	38.05		31	+8	24	+7
UC–FLNKS	14,364	11.93		16	+1	10	+1
FLNKS	12,842	10.66		7	0	6	0
National Union for Independence	12,720	10.56		9	–5	6	–3
Oceanian Awakening	8,399	6.97		5	+1	4	0
Us, united!	4,554	3.78	New	0	New	0	New
Faire Pays	4,428	3.68	New	0	New	0	New
Caledonia Together	3,887	3.23		0	–9	0	–7
Nation Autochtone	3,855	3.20		6	+4	3	+2
Palika Îles	2,481	2.06		2	+2	1	+1
Union to build through consensus	2,404	2.00		0	–2	0	–1
A hope for tomorrow	1,520	1.26	New	0	New	0	New
For a French Caledonia	1,158	0.96	New	0	New	0	New
Kanaky sovereignty New Caledonia	1,003	0.83	New	0	New	0	New
France-Caledonia: A homeland	727	0.60		0	0	0	0
Baselaia	137	0.11	New	0	New	0	New
To commit and work for the prosperity of our province and the sovereignty of our country	125	0.10	New	0	New	0	New
Total	120,429	100.00	–	76	0	54	0
Valid votes	120,429	98.18					
Invalid votes	853	0.70					
Blank votes	1,383	1.13					
Total votes	122,665	100.00					
Registered voters/turnout	192,537	63.71					

=== By bloc ===
Graph of the party split among 54 seats.
Party	Votes	%	Seats			
Party	Votes	%	Provincial assemblies	+/–	Congress	+/–
Loyalists; Loyalists, CE, UED, RN, Us, united!, PCF	57,671	47.89	31	–1	24	-1
Separatists; UC–FLNKS, UNI, PT, SK, LKS, PALINKA, UCC, Baselaia, S'EŒPNPSNP	49,931	41.46	40	0	26	0
Others (EO, Faire pays)	12,827	10.65	5	+1	4	+1
Total	120,429	100.00	76	1	54	0

=== Provincial Assemblies ===
==== North ====
Graph of the party split among 22 seats.
Party	Votes	%	+/–	Seats	+/–
UC–FLNKS	10,418	39.93	+3.97	10	+1
National Union for Independence	9,319	35.72	–2.78	9	–1
Let's act together for the North	4,261	16.33	+4.15	3	0
Northern alternative for a sovereign country	1,239	4.75	+1.41	0	0
Faire Pays	853	3.27	New	0	New
Total	26,090	100.00	–	22	0
Valid votes	26,090	98.44			
Invalid votes	207	0.78			
Blank votes	207	0.78			
Total votes	26,504	100.00			
Registered voters/turnout	43,023	61.60			

==== South ====
Graph of the party split among 40 seats.
Party	Votes	%	+/–	Seats	+/–
Les Loyalistes and Le Rassemblement – Strong and United	41,294	50.14	+9.55	28	+8
Kanaky for all (FLNKS)	12,842	15.59	–2.17	7	+3
Another world is possible	8,399	10.20	+1.64	5	+1
Us, united!	4,554	5.53	New	0	New
A province for all, a united country, a shared future	3,887	4.72	–13.77	0	–9
Faire Pays	3,575	4.34	New	0	New
United for the country	3,401	4.13	N/A (Note: Part of FLNKS in 2019)	0	–3
A hope for tomorrow	1,520	1.85	New	0	New
For a French Caledonia	1,158	1.41	New	0	New
Kanaky sovereignty New Caledonia	1,003	1.22	New	0	New
France-Caledonia: A homeland	727	0.88	New	0	New
Total	82,360	100.00	–	40	0
Valid votes	82,360	98.02			
Invalid votes	578	0.69			
Blank votes	1,089	1.30			
Total votes	84,027	100.00			
Registered voters/turnout	127,421	65.94			

==== Loyalty Islands ====
Graph of the party split among 15 seats.
Party	Votes	%	+/–	Seats	+/–
UC–FLNKS	3,946	32.94	–4.15	6	0
Nation Autochtone	3,855	32.18	+21.20	6	+4
Palika Îles	2,481	20.71	–0.53	3	–2
Union to build through consensus	1,165	9.73	–4.61	0	–2
A new breath	270	2.25	–7.14	0	0
Baselaia	137	1.14	New	0	New
To commit and work for the prosperity of our province and the sovereignty of our country	125	1.04	New	0	New
Total	11,979	100.00	–	15	0
Valid votes	11,979	98.72			
Invalid votes	68	0.56			
Blank votes	87	0.72			
Total votes	12,134	100.00			
Registered voters/turnout	22,093	54.92			

== Aftermath ==
On 9 July 2026, a governance agreement was reached between the lists Les Loyalistes – The Rally and Oceanian Awakening : Virginie Ruffenach (R-LR) was to become president of the Congress and Milakulo Tukumuli (EO) was to become President of the Government, the first person of Wallisian descent to be elected in that office. He was congratulated by Australia's Foreign Affairs Minister Penny Wong. He unveiled his new cabinet on 6 August 2026.
