= 2019 New Caledonian legislative election =

- 12 May 2019
- All 54 seats in the Congress; 28 seats needed for a majority
Party	Leader	Vote %	Seats	+/–
AEC	Virginie Ruffenach	29.35	18	+5
Ensemble	Philippe Michel	14.48	7	−8
UC–FLNKS	Pierre-Chanel Tutugoro	12.94	9	−1
UNI	Jean-Pierre Djaïwe	11.51	9	+2
FLNKS	Jean-Pierre Djaïwé	10.23	6	+1
EO	Milakulo Tukumuli	5.52	3	New
PT	Louis Kotra Uregei	3.80	1	0
LKS	Basile Citré	1.39	1	0
This lists parties that won seats. See the complete results below.
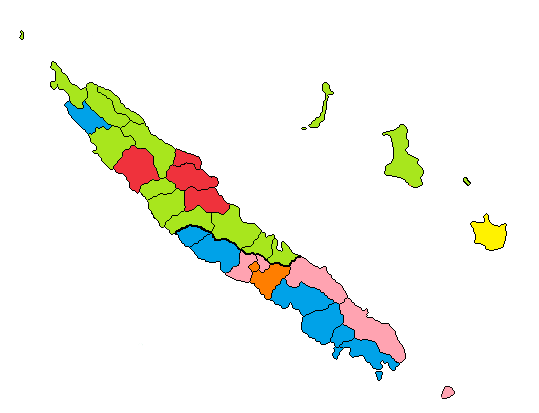
Results by province.
President of the Congress before	President of the Congress after
Gaël Yanno; MPC	Roch Wamytan; UC

Legislative elections were held in New Caledonia on 12 May 2019 to elect members of the Congress of New Caledonia and members of the provincial assemblies.

Anti-independence parties retained their majority in Congress, with the centre-right, liberal conservative Future with Confidence party winning a plurality of seats in Congress.

== Electoral system ==
Voters elect 76 members to the assemblies of the three provinces of New Caledonia (40 for South Province, 22 for North Province, and 14 for the Loyalty Islands Province). In turn, 54 also become members of the Congress of New Caledonia (32 from South Province, 15 from North Province, and 7 from Loyalty Islands Province).

The elections are held under party-list proportional representation using a 5% electoral threshold and the highest averages method to allocate seats. The elections used a restricted roll, which restricts voting depending on how long someone has lived in New Caledonia. Only persons residing in New Caledonia since at least 8 November 1998 (and their children, once they reach the age of majority) are able to vote.

== Results ==
Seats won by Provincial assemblies (left) and Congress (right)
Party	Votes	%	Seats			
Party	Votes	%	Provincial assemblies	+/–	Congress	+/–
Future with Confidence	32,336	29.35	23	+7	18	+5
Caledonia Together	15,948	14.48	9	–11	7	–8
Caledonian Union–FLNKS	14,255	12.94	15	–2	9	–1
National Union for Independence	12,679	11.51	14	+3	9	+2
Kanak and Socialist National Liberation Front	11,269	10.23	7	+1	6	+1
Oceanian Awakening	6,077	5.52	4	New	3	New
Labour Party	4,182	3.80	2	0	1	0
National Rally	2,707	2.46	0	0	0	0
Citizens' Alliance	2,043	1.85	0	New	0	New
New Independence and Sovereignty Movement	1,971	1.79	0	New	0	New
Building Differently	1,852	1.68	0	New	0	New
Common Caledonian Destiny	1,667	1.51	0	New	0	New
Kanak Socialist Liberation	1,536	1.39	2	0	1	0
New and Reunited Caledonia	841	0.76	0	New	0	New
Unitary Kanaky Generation	800	0.73	0	New	0	New
Total	110,163	100.00	76	0	54	0
Valid votes	110,163	97.70				
Invalid/blank votes	2,597	2.30				
Total votes	112,760	100.00				
Registered voters/turnout	169,635	66.47				
Source: New Caledonia Government

=== By bloc ===
Graph of the party split among 54 seats.
Party	Votes	%	Seats			
Party	Votes	%	Provincial assemblies	+/–	Congress	+/–
Loyalists; AEC, CE, RN, DCC, CNR	53,499	48.56	32	–5	25	–4
Separatists; UC, FLNKS, UNI, PT, MNIS, LKS, UKG	46,692	42.38	40	+1	26	+1
Neutral; EO, ACT, CA	9,972	9.05	4	+4	3	+3
Total	110,163	100.00	76	0	54	0
Valid votes	110,163	97.70				
Invalid/blank votes	2,597	2.30				
Total votes	112,760	100.00				
Registered voters/turnout	169,635	66.47				

=== Provincial assemblies ===
==== South ====
Party	Votes	%	+/–	Seats	+/–
Future with Confidence	28,802	40.59	+2.21	20	+5
Caledonia Together	13,122	18.49	–17.95	9	–8
Kanak and Socialist National Liberation Front	11,269	15.88	–2.13	7	+1
Oceanian Awakening	6,077	8.56	New	4	New
National Rally	2,707	3.81	–0.16	0	0
Citizens' Alliance	2,043	2.88	New	0	New
Building Differently	1,852	2.61	New	0	New
Common Caledonian Destiny	1,667	2.35	New	0	New
Labour	1,335	1.88	New	0	New
New Independence and Sovereign Movement	1,244	1.75	New	0	New
New and Reunited Caledonia	841	1.19	New	0	New
Total	70,959	100.00	–	40	0
Valid votes	70,959	97.33			
Invalid votes	592	0.81			
Blank votes	1,356	1.86			
Total votes	72,907	100.00			

==== North ====
Party	Votes	%	+/–	Seats	+/–
National Union for Independence	9,709	38.50	+0.57	10	+1
UC–FLNKS	9,069	35.96	+0.60	9	0
Future with Confidence	3,072	12.18	+2.82	3	+2
Caledonia Together	1,975	7.83	–3.11	0	–3
Labour Party	842	3.34	–3.06	0	0
New Independence and Sovereign Movement	554	2.20	New	0	New
Total	25,221	100.00	–	22	0
Valid votes	25,221	97.93			
Invalid votes	233	0.90			
Blank votes	300	1.16			
Total votes	25,754	100.00			

==== Loyalty Islands ====
Party or alliance		Votes	%	+/–	Seats	+/–
Separatists	UC–FLNKS	5,186	37.09	–13.47	6	–2
Separatists	UNI–Palika	2,970	21.24	+6.18	4	+2
Separatists	Labour Party	2,005	14.34	–1.66	2	0
Separatists	Kanak Socialist Liberation	1,536	10.98	–0.51	2	0
Separatists	Unitary Kanaky Generation	800	5.72	New	0	New
Separatists	New Independence and Sovereign Movement	173	1.24	New	0	New
Loyalists	Caledonia Together	851	6.09	New	0	New
Loyalists	Future with Confidence	462	3.30	–3.59	0	0
Total		13,983	100.00	–	14	0
Valid votes		13,983	99.18			
Invalid votes		58	0.41			
Blank votes		58	0.41			
Total votes		14,099	100.00			
