= Politics of New Caledonia =

New Caledonia is a French sui generis collectivity with a system of government based on parliamentarism and representative democracy. The President of the Government is the head of government, and there is a multi-party system, with Executive power being exercised by the government. Legislative power is vested in both the executive and the Congress of New Caledonia. The judiciary is independent of the executive and the legislature.

== Political developments ==
Article 77 of the Constitution of France and the Organic Law 99-209 confers a unique status on New Caledonia between that of an independent country and a regular collectivité d'outre-mer or overseas collectivité of France. A territorial congress and government have been established, and the 1998 Nouméa Accord organized a devolution of powers. Key areas such as taxation, labor law, health and hygiene and foreign trade are already in the hands of the Congress. Further powers will supposedly be given to the Congress in the near future.

Under article 4 of the Organic Law 99-209 a New Caledonian citizenship has also been introduced: only New Caledonian citizens (defined by article 188) have the right to vote in the local elections. This measure has been criticized, because it creates a second-class status for French citizens living in New Caledonia who do not possess New Caledonian citizenship (because they settled in the territory only recently). New Caledonia is also allowed to engage in international cooperation with independent countries of the Pacific Ocean. Finally, the territorial Congress is allowed to pass statutes that are contrary to French law in a certain number of areas.

On the other hand, New Caledonia remains an integral part of the French Republic. Inhabitants of New Caledonia are French citizens and carry French passports. They take part in the legislative and presidential French elections. New Caledonia sends two representatives to the French National Assembly and two senators to the French Senate. The representative of the French central state in New Caledonia is the High Commissioner of the Republic (Haut-Commissaire de la République, locally known as "haussaire"), who is the head of civil services, and who sits in the government of the territory.

The Nouméa Accord stipulates that the Congress will have the right to call for a referendum on independence after 2014, at a time of its choosing. Following the timeline set by the Nouméa Accord, the groundwork was laid for a Referendum on full independence from France at a meeting chaired by the French Prime Minister Édouard Philippe on 2 November 2017, with the referendum to be held by November 2018. Voter list eligibility had been a subject of a long dispute, but the details were resolved at this meeting. In the 2018 referendum, voters narrowly chose to remain a part of France. Two further referendums were permitted, being held in 2020 and 2021. 2020 saw slimmer margins than in the 2018 referendum, with 46.74% in favor of independence, while the 2021 vote overwhelmingly rejected independence, with 96.49% against it but on only a 43.87% turnout. Kanak communities largely boycotted this referendum, advised by their leadership and still in mourning following mortality in the covid-19 pandemic.

The current president of the government elected by the Congress is Louis Mapou, from the pro-independence Palika political party.

In May 2024, riots broke out following controversial voting reforms.

On 13 July 2025, the Elysée Palace signed an institutional development agreement for New Caledonia between French and Caledonian elected officials, known as the Bougival Accord. It took place after months of negotiations concluded with an agreement between all parties New Caledonia should remain within France, but with far greater levels of autonomy, the status of a state, and a dual citizenship arrangement for those that wish it. The agreement will require ratification by both chambers of the French parliamentary system, and a probably referendum in New Caledonia in 2026. Initial thoughts on the deal suggest it is not what independence supporters hoped for, but statehood is a major concession by France.

== Executive branch ==
Main office-holders
Office	Name	Party	Since
High Commissioner	Louis Le Franc		6 February 2023
President of the Government	Louis Mapou	National Union for Independence-Palika	22 July 2021

The high commissioner is appointed by the French president on the advice of the French Ministry of Interior. The president of the government is elected by the members of the Territorial Congress.

== Legislative branch ==
The Congress (Congrès) has 54 members, being the members of the three regional councils, all elected for a five-year term by proportional representation. Furthermore, there is a 16-member Kanak Customary Senate (two members from each of the eight customary aires).

== Political parties and elections ==
=== 2019 territorial election ===
Seats won by Provincial assemblies (left) and Congress (right)
Party	Votes	%	Seats			
Party	Votes	%	Provincial assemblies	+/–	Congress	+/–
Future with Confidence	32,336	29.35	23	+7	18	+5
Caledonia Together	15,948	14.48	9	–11	7	–8
Caledonian Union–FLNKS	14,255	12.94	15	–2	9	–1
National Union for Independence	12,679	11.51	14	+3	9	+2
Kanak and Socialist National Liberation Front	11,269	10.23	7	+1	6	+1
Oceanian Awakening	6,077	5.52	4	New	3	New
Labour Party	4,182	3.80	2	0	1	0
National Rally	2,707	2.46	0	0	0	0
Citizens' Alliance	2,043	1.85	0	New	0	New
New Independence and Sovereignty Movement	1,971	1.79	0	New	0	New
Building Differently	1,852	1.68	0	New	0	New
Common Caledonian Destiny	1,667	1.51	0	New	0	New
Kanak Socialist Liberation	1,536	1.39	2	0	1	0
New and Reunited Caledonia	841	0.76	0	New	0	New
Unitary Kanaky Generation	800	0.73	0	New	0	New
Total	110,163	100.00	76	0	54	0
Valid votes	110,163	97.70				
Invalid/blank votes	2,597	2.30				
Total votes	112,760	100.00				
Registered voters/turnout	169,635	66.47				
Source: New Caledonia Government

=== Parliamentarians ===
==== French National Assembly ====
- Nicolas Metzdorf (first constituency, Générations NC, GNC) elected 2024; previously represented the second constituency
- Emmanuel Tjibaou (second constituency, Caledonian Union, UC) elected 2024

==== French Senate ====
- Georges Naturel (The Rally, R-LR) elected 2023
- Robert Xowie (Caledonian Union, UC) elected 2023

== Judicial branch ==
Court of Appeal or Cour d'Appel; County Courts; Joint Commerce Tribunal Court; Children's Court

== Administrative divisions ==
New Caledonia is divided into three provinces: Province des Îles, Province Nord, and Province Sud - which are further subdivided into 33 communes.

== International organization participation ==
- French-Pacific Banking Agreement
- International Confederation of Free Trade Unions
- Pacific Islands Forum (associate)
- The Pacific Community (SPC)
- United Nations Economic and Social Commission for Asia and the Pacific (associate)
- World Federation of Trade Unions
- World Meteorological Organization.

== See also ==
- Ouvéa cave hostage taking
- Bougival Accord
