= List of political parties in New Caledonia =

The emergence of political parties in New Caledonia first began towards the end of World War Two, when local support for the Free France movement grew. Gaullist politics dominated until the 1970s and from 1980s parties have generally been divided over questions of independence and autonomy under French rule.

== Political parties ==
Party	Party initials	Ideology
Kanak and Socialist National Liberation Front; Front de libération nationale kanak et socialiste	FLNKS	Melanesian socialism, Pro-independence
The Rally; Le Rassemblement	Rassemblement-LR	Conservatism, Anti-independence
Caledonia Together; Caledonie Ensemble	CE	Liberalism, Anti-independence
Caledonian Republicans; Les Républicains calédoniens	LRC	Liberalism, Anti-independence
Caledonian People's Movement; Mouvement Populaire Calédonien	MPC	Conservatism, Anti-independence
Caledonian Union; Union Calédonienne	UC	Pro-independence
Party of Kanak Liberation; Parti de libération kanak	PALIKA	Socialism, Pro-independence
National Rally; Rassemblement National	RN	Far-right, Anti-independence
Oceanian Awakening; L'Éveil Océanien	EO	Ethnist, neutral
Générations NC	GNC	Liberalism, Anti-independence
Kanak Socialist Liberation; Libération Kanak Socialiste	LKS	Pro-independence
Renewed Caledonian Union; Union Calédonienne Renouveau	UC-R	Pro-independence
Melanesian Progressive Union; Union progressiste mélanésienne	UPM	Pro-independence
Labour Party; Parti travailliste	PT	Socialism, Pro-independence
Oceanian Democratic Rally; Rassemblement démocratique océanien	RDO	Pro-independence
All Caledonians; Tous calédoniens		Liberalism, Anti-independence

== Historical parties ==
- Communist Party of New Caledonia (1941–1948)

== See also ==
- Politics of New Caledonia
- List of political parties by country
