= 2024 New Caledonia unrest =

Civil unrest in the French overseas territory of New Caledonia (May–December 2024)

- Part of Protests against Emmanuel Macron
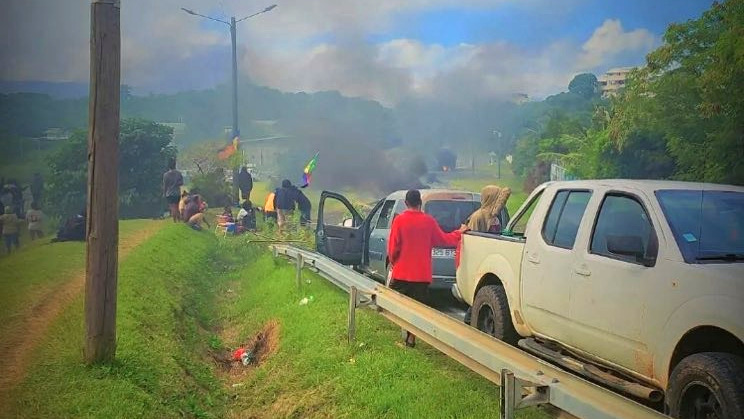
- Date: 13 May 2024 – 2 December 2024
- Location: New Caledonia
- Caused by: Attempt to modify France's constitution to expand the non-indigenous electorate in New Caledonia; Social inequalities, racial tensions
- Goals: Cancellation of the reform bill
- Methods: Protests; riots; arson; looting; roadblocks
- Status: Concluded: Proposed constitutional reform scrapped

Parties
Protesters: PT; FCCI	Government of France; New Caledonia; FANC; CRS; GIGN; RAID; Mobile Gendarmerie; GBGM; French Army; French Air Force (non-combat); Loyalist militias

Number
~27,000 Kanak protesters & rioters	3,000 military & police personnel; ~550 loyalist militiamen; 16 VIPG Centaur vehicles

Deaths, arrests and damages
- Deaths: 14
- Injuries: 486 Police personnel and Gendarmerie; Unknown number of demonstrators
- Arrested: 2030+
- Damage: €3 billion in economic damage 900 businesses destroyed 200 houses destroyed 600 vehicles burned 400+ businesses damaged 80−90% of grocery network destroyed or damaged

In May 2024, protests and riots broke out in New Caledonia, a sui generis collectivity of overseas France in the Pacific Ocean. The violent protests led to at least 13 deaths, the declaration of a state of emergency on 16 May, deployment of the French army, and the block of the social network TikTok.

Violence broke out following a controversial voting reform aiming to change existing conditions which prevent up to one-fifth of the population from voting in provincial elections. Following the Nouméa Accord, the electorate for local elections was restricted to pre-1998 residents of the islands and their descendants who have maintained continuous residence on the territory for at least 10 years. The system, which excludes migrants from European and Polynesian parts of France, including their adult children, had been judged acceptable in 2005 as part of a decolonisation process by the European Court of Human Rights given that it was a provisional measure. Voters in all three referendums were in favour of remaining part of France, though the 2021 referendum, conducted in the middle of the COVID-19 pandemic, was boycotted by most independence supporters. For the French government, the referendums fulfilled the Nouméa Accord process, but independence advocates, who rejected the legitimacy of the boycotted 2021 referendum, considered the process defined by the Nouméa Accord to be still ongoing.

While the Kanak independence movement continues to demand full self-determination, many French officials see extending voting rights as essential for democratic fairness in the territory. The French government is seeking to undo a 2007 Constitutional amendment, which allows the denial of voting rights in local elections to people even though they have resided in the territory for over 10 years. This reform would allow roughly 60% of those currently prevented from voting to join the electorate. President Emmanuel Macron visited the island on 22 May and asked local representatives to reach a comprehensive agreement within a month, mentioning the possibility of a referendum concerning Paris' desired changes in voter eligibility rules.

The state of emergency ended on 28 May. Due to the 9 June dissolution of the National Assembly, Macron announced the de facto suspension of the Constitutional reform while it was impossible to convene the two houses of the French legislature. In October 2024, then-French Prime Minister Michel Barnier scrapped the bill, citing the need to restore calm and telling the National Assembly that "avoiding further unrest" was a priority. On 2 December 2024, curfew was officially lifted as the riots were over.

== Background ==
Location of New Caledonia in Oceania

New Caledonia is a French overseas territory in the southwest Pacific. It has a population of about 270,000; with the indigenous Kanak people constituting, according to the 2019 census, 41% of the population, the Europeans (Caldoche and metropolitan French) 28%, those of mixed race 11%, with other ethnic minorities (including Wallisians, Tahitians, Polynesians Ni-Vanuatu, Indonesians, Vietnamese and Chinese) constituting the remainder. New Caledonia became a French overseas territory in 1946 and has representatives in both houses of the French Parliament, while the President of France serves as the territory's head of state. France maintains jurisdiction over New Caledonia's justice system, defense, and internal security.

In 1988, following widespread political violence between Caldoches and indigenous Kanaks — a period referred to as "the Events" (French: Les Événements) — the Matignon Agreements were signed, establishing a transition to its current large autonomy as a sui generis collectivity within the French state. This was followed in 1998 by the Nouméa Accord. As part of the Accord, New Caledonia was allowed to hold three referendums to decide on the future status of the territory, with voting rights restricted to indigenous Kanak and other inhabitants living in New Caledonia before 1998.

=== "Frozen" electorate ===
As part of the Nouméa Accord of 1998, the population of New Caledonia continued to vote in national elections—for the French president and National Assembly—but the number of people who can vote in provincial elections and independence referendums was restricted. This so-called "frozen electorate" consists only of those who were already living in New Caledonia in 1998 as well as their children, provided they maintained uninterrupted residence for ten years prior to each election. This deprived later immigrants, whether European or Polynesian, of voting rights. The number of excluded voters increased from 8,000 in 1999 to 18,000 in 2009 and to 42,000 in 2023, by which time almost one national voter out of five was excluded from participating in provincial elections (of 220,000 national voters only 178,000 were eligible). This restriction aimed at preventing the disempowerment of the native Kanak community that would result from the arrival in large number of people from metropolitan France.

Following a ruling by the French Constitutional Council in 1999 which limited the restriction to a simple ten-year residency requirement (a so-called "rolling electorate"), French president Jacques Chirac promised to have the French constitution amended on the request of independence groups in 2003. His parliamentary majority voted for the revision in 2007, thereby reverting to the "frozen electorate" rule. The European Court of Human Rights ruled in 2005 that the restriction did not infringe the right to free elections and did not give rise to discrimination on the grounds of national origin since "New Caledonia's current status reflects a transitional phase prior to the acquisition of full sovereignty and is part of a process of self-determination", with the system then in place being "incomplete and provisional", which has been interpreted to mean that the frozen electorate was validated on the condition that it was only a provisional measure.

=== Situation after independence referendums ===
New Caledonia then had three consecutive independence referendums (in 2018, 2020 and 2021). Before the final referendum, the pro-independence candidate Louis Mapou was elected President of the Government of New Caledonia.

Results of the 2018 and 2020 referendums were 56.6% and 53.2% in favor of remaining part of France with 81% and 85.7% turnout respectively. With 46.7% of the vote in favor of independence and roughly 10,000 votes (of 155,000 participants) separating the two camps at the second referendum, the push for independence was stronger than expected. There was a very strong correlation between ethnic origin and voting, with the Kanaks overwhelmingly voting for and the other communities voting against independence. The pro-independence movement asked that the third referendum, which it had originally requested, be postponed due to the spread of COVID-19 within their community from September 2021 onward and the resulting impossibility of conducting a campaign while observing the customary Kanak mourning periods. The French government decided the referendum would go ahead as long as the sanitary situation improved. The anti-independence movement said that the 280 COVID-19 deaths were being instrumentalized by their opponents to postpone a referendum they were poised to lose. Partisans of independence had recently been weakened by their handling of the nickel economic crisis, as well as by the support given by France during the pandemic, which included 10 billion CFP franc (83 million euros) in financial aid, free vaccines, and medical staff from metropolitan France. The Kanak boycotted the referendum, resulting in a 96.5% victory for the anti-independence camp with 43.9% turnout. The national government viewed the "frozen electorate" as obsolete once the process of the three referendums defined by the Nouméa Accord ended. Documents published by the national government in 2021 listing the consequences of a "yes" or "no" vote in the referendum mentioned that the frozen electorate was not a permanent measure, but that it would not be automatically overturned by a third consecutive "no" vote.

Advocates for independence, who had boycotted the third referendum, considered it illegitimate, leading to institutional deadlock. Local talks ground to a halt and the next provincial election was rescheduled for 15 December 2024. On 26 December 2023, the Conseil d'État concluded that the current rules infringed significantly on universal suffrage, as they denied the vote to people either born or residing in New Caledonia for several decades.

Any revision of the transitional Nouméa Accord rules concerning eligible voters will require changes to the French constitution. At the beginning of 2024, the French government began a revision of the constitution which would "unfreeze" the electorate by keeping only a rolling ten-year residency requirement. Up to 25,841 people of the 42,000 excluded from the electorate would gain voting rights: 12,441 who were born and grew up in New Caledonia would gain the right automatically and up to 13,400 with ten years of continuous residence on the island could request it. A total of 16,000 citizens would remain excluded from participating in the provincial election. It included a clause that would prevent it from being implemented if a local deal between pro- and anti-independence groups was made at least ten days before the election.

A bipartisan group sent by the National Assembly to consult political, religious and tribal leaders concluded that "unfreezing" the electorate was a "legal and democratic necessity". It advised against doing so immediately due to the chaotic political situation. In its report released mid-March, it noted in particular the pessimistic mood prevalent on the island because of the chaotic political situation and permanent uncertainty about its future, which had led to the emigration of New Caledonians, often those excluded from the electorate, but also of educated Kanaks. This demographic trend mentioned in the report contrasts with the pro-independence claims of an ongoing demographic replacement via "massive immigration". The report caused controversy by relaying the opinion of several independence advocates, including Roch Wamytan, president of the Congress of New Caledonia, who asked whether President Emmanuel Macron was considering "recolonizing" New Caledonia and who further said that the "threshold of tolerance for whites" had been reached. Members of the pro-independence Caledonian Union also said that "If you make a change of the electorate, it will be war. Our youth is ready to go for it. If we have to sacrifice a thousand, we will do so".

On 2 April 2024, the French Senate, the French Parliament's upper house, voted to endorse constitutional amendments tabled by Interior Minister Gérald Darmanin to extend suffrage to those who had been residing in New Caledonia for an uninterrupted 10 years. On 15 April, groups of supporters and opponents staged competing marches in Nouméa in response to the proposed French constitutional amendment. The pro-independence march was organized by a field action coordination committee close to Union Calédonienne (UC), which is part of the FLNKS umbrella. The pro-French march was organized by the two pro-French parties Le Rassemblement and Les Loyalistes. The French High Commission estimated that a total of 40,000 people (15% of the population) attended the marches. Pro-independence organisers claimed 58,000 attended their rally and pro-French organizers claimed 35,000 attended theirs.

On 15 May, the National Assembly, the French Parliament's lower house voted in favor of the constitutional amendments by a margin of 351 to 153 votes. While right-wing parties supported "unfreezing" the list of voters, left-wing parties voted against the amendments. After passing both houses, the constitutional amendments still need to be approved by a two-thirds majority of the Congress of the French Parliament (a joint session of both the National Assembly and Senate).

=== Response to the bill ===
Local leaders said that giving "foreigners" the right to vote would dilute the vote of indigenous Kanak people and increase the vote share for pro-French politicians.

=== Socio-economic factors ===
The economy and unemployment were reportedly factors in the unrest due to the local nickel mining sector having experienced a downturn. According to Politico, New Caledonia has 30% of the world's nickel reserves. Nikkei Asia reported that New Caledonia had the 5th largest reserve of the world's nickel and that difficulties were caused by a glut in the global nickel market. Nickel mining makes up 90% of all exports and employs around a "quarter of its workforce" according to the Associated Press. By 2023, the nickel sector's profitability had declined due to governmental export restrictions, high energy costs and competition from Indonesian and other Asian nickel producers. With production down 32% in the first quarter of 2023, French authorities warned that the territory's three main nickel processing factories could shut down, leading to an unemployment crisis. Several major investors including Glencore and Euramet either curtailed new investments in New Caledonia or sought to sell off their holdings. The French government promised €200 million in subsidies for the nickel sector, but this "nickel pact" was denounced by independence supporters as a neocolonial measure that would increase Paris' power over the territory.

While strides have been made towards making access to higher education more equitable, the programs for secondary education are still decided in metropolitan France. In 2021, Kanaks were 2.4 times less likely to find a professional internship for their last year of middle school. In 2017, Kanaks were 5.1 times less likely to earn a baccalauréat général and 8.3 times less likely to have a college degree than their Caldoche counterparts. According to studies carried out in the 2010s, Kanaks were more likely to experience discrimination in access to everything from nightclubs to housing, particularly in Nouméa. A 2014 Senate report indicated that 95% of the inmates in Nouméa penitentiary were of Kanak origin. According to Marie Salaün and Benoît Trépied, it was this socioeconomic context that led "marginalized youth" to "play a leading role in the explosion of urban violence in May 2024."

=== Firearms ownership ===
New Caledonia has a high level of gun ownership. French youth sociologist Evelyne Barthou and French National Centre for Scientific Research anthropologist Benoît Trépied have attributed New Caledonia's high level of gun ownership to a long history of hunting and cattle herding among both the Kanak and Caldoche populations. In 2011, gun sales soared in New Caledonia after the government eased firearms regulations, with a total value of US$1.6 million in 2011. According to RNZ and Nouméa's daily newspaper Les Nouvelles Calédoniennes, the number of firearms being sold rose from 1,800 in 2010 to 2,500 in 2011. Under the new law, people could buy an unlimited number of firearms if they could provide an identity card, hunting license and a medical certificate confirming physical and mental aptitude to buy a firearm.

In November 2013, the French Government announced that it would tighten gun laws before the end of the year, leading to a spike in gun sales in New Caledonia. French High Commissioner Jean-Jacques Brot said that gun sales had doubled while local media claimed that the figure had increased tenfold. In late September 2016, the French Supreme Court struck down a decree seeking to limit gun ownership in New Caledonia since it had not been signed by the ministers of sport and transport. The process for reissuing the decree is expected to take six months. By April 2024, a French National Assembly report estimated that 64,000 hunting and sporting weapons were in circulation across the archipelago. If illegal weapons were included, French authorities estimated that this figure rose to 100,000 firearms, resulting in a high ratio of gun ownership per total population (roughly 286,500 people). According to anthropologist Nathanaëlle Soler, weapons were stockpiled "in anticipation of post-referendum strife".

== Timeline ==
On 13 May 2024, violence broke out in Nouméa. The clashes pitted law enforcement forces against pro-independence demonstrators, causing fires, looting and injuries among the gendarmes. Three prison employees were briefly taken hostage during an attempted mutiny in the Nouméa prison center. Schools and public services in the affected areas were closed. The French high commissioner requested reinforcements from Paris to maintain order and announced a ban on the carrying and transporting of weapons as well as on the sale of alcohol for 48 hours. A large factory, specializing in bottling was completely burnt down in Nouméa. Nouméa firefighters said they received nearly 1,500 calls overnight and responded to around 200 fires. Around thirty shops, factories and other businesses were set on fire.

Supermarkets and car dealerships were looted and vehicles and businesses were burned. Areas affected include Nouméa and the neighbouring towns of Dumbéa and Le Mont-Dore, where gendarmes were fired upon with large caliber hunting rifles. Thirty-six protesters were arrested. Authorities imposed a curfew and public gatherings were banned for two days beginning on 14 May. The French Minister of the Interior Gérald Darmanin announced that police reinforcements were being sent to the island.

On 15 May, reports arose about the deaths of two people overnight, the first was apparently killed in an act of self defence while the circumstances of the second death remained unclear. Violent riots continued. Clashes erupted between supporters and opponents of independence. Three Kanak protestors were killed during a drive-by shooting committed by a motorist whose car was stopped at a barricade, while a gendarme was killed in an ambush. By the end of the day four people were dead (including a gendarme) and 300 people were injured. 140 people were arrested. More than 70 police officers and gendarmes were also injured, while around 80 businesses were burned or ransacked. Some residents erected barricades to protect their properties and the riots lead to food shortages. The high commissioner described the situation as "insurrectional" and evoking the risk of a "civil war" . Emmanuel Macron called for calm and stated that he plans to hold a meeting of the territorial congress to ratify the reform. A defense council was held by Emmanuel Macron, following which a decree aimed at declaring a state of emergency in New Caledonia was requested by the President of the Republic and placed on the agenda of the Council of Ministers.

On 16 May, the state of emergency came into force at 05:00 in Nouméa. Forty-five minutes after imposition of the state of emergency, Prime Minister Gabriel Attal announced the deployment of the French army to ensure the security of seaports and airports. TikTok was also banned in New Caledonia.

On 18 May, French interior minister Gérald Darmanin announced the launch of a major operation aimed at taking total control of the 60 km main road between Nouméa and La Tontouta International Airport. More than 600 gendarmes, including a hundred GIGN operatives were set to take part in the operation.

On 19 May, French authorities announced the success of the operation, claiming the destruction of 76 barricades, more than 200 arrests and the reopening of 20 food businesses. The French High Commissioner's office confirmed that unidentified groups set two fires and raided a police station between 18 and 19 May, with 230 rioters arrested. It was reported that the rioters had taken control of the northern districts of Nouméa. French High Commissioner Louis Le Franc announced that French security forces would be launching new raids against pro-independence strongholds across New Caledonia. Le Franc also confirmed that customs officials had secured 103 containers of food and medicine at Nouméa's port.

On the night of 21 May to 22 May, a cyber attack took place in New Caledonia after the announcement of Emmanuel Macron's arrival. This alleged external attack was carried out by sending millions of emails simultaneously and was aimed at saturating the New Caledonian internet network. But the French authorities were able to thwart the cyber attack before it caused significant damage. Moreover, Australia evacuated 300 citizens who had registered with the Australian authorities for assistance in leaving New Caledonia. and RNZAF Lockheed C-130 Hercules plane evacuated 50 New Zealanders.

On 22 May, President Emmanuel Macron visited the island and asked local actors to reach a comprehensive agreement within a month. He evoked the possibility of a referendum concerning Paris' desired changes in voter eligibility rules if the Congress did not reach an agreement, and compared the violence gripping the territory to the riots in the Hexagon after the killing of Nahel Merzouk. Two primary schools and 300 vehicles at a car dealership were torched overnight.

On 23 May a RNZAF Boeing 757 evacuated 50 more civilians.

Clashes continued and on 24 May, a clash between police and rioters led to the death of a Kanak demonstrator. On 24 May a third flight evacuated 50 New Zealanders on a C130.

On 25 May, riots continued and France started the evacuation of French tourists from New Caledonia. Some were evacuated via aircraft of the French military. Some were evacuated via flights chartered by French army to Australia and New Zealand and from there to France.

On 26 May, pro-independence leaders stated the goal of full independence from France and also advised rioters to loosen their grip on barricades to allow supplies to pass through while making it clear that 'resistance' would continue and barricades would remain in place.

The French government lifted the state of emergency in New Caledonia at 05:00 on 28 May. A facilitation mission aimed at reestablishing dialogue between the independentists and the loyalists. The establishment of the curfew and the ban on TikTok, taken outside of this framework, was maintained, as was the ban on transporting or carrying weapons and the sale of alcohol. The reopening of Nouméa-La Tontouta International Airport was not planned before June 2.

The ban on TikTok was lifted on 29 May.

On 31 May, French authorities announced the restoration of full control over Nouméa following a major police operation in the Riviere-Salee district that resulted in 12 arrests.

On 1 June, a young off-duty police officer of Kanak origin was attacked by vigilantes.

On 3 June, two men attacked a gendarme vehicle, prompting its occupant to gendarme shooting them both. One of the attackers died from his injuries on 7 June.

By 5 June, commercial flights had resumed at La Tontouta International Airport on a limited basis. The main road between Nouméa and the international airport remains blocked by numerous blockades erected by groups of rioters.

On 12 June, Emmanuel Macron announced the suspension of the constitutional reform changing New Caledonia's electoral body during a press conference following the dissolution of the National Assembly.

On 19 June, authorities announced the arrest of 11 people, including Christian Tein, the leader of the pro-independence movement CCAT (Field Action Coordination Cell), on suspicion of instigating the violence. Seven of the eleven were flown to metropolitan France, including: Tein, who was detained in Mulhouse for further questioning; the CCAT communications director, who was held in Dijon; and the director of the Congressional president's office, who was incarcerated in Riom. Demonstrations took place in mainland France notably near the building of the Ministry of Justice and in Lutterbach.

On 23 June, riots broke out again in Nouméa, during which protesters set fire to the town hall of Koumac as well as several police vehicles, destroyed parts of Païta and set up roadblocks. A firefighting vehicle was also attacked in Dumbéa. A police station and several other buildings were set alight across New Caledonia.

On 1 July, French police and GIGN carried out an operation in Houillou on the eastern coast of the island.

On 10 July, a gun battle between French security forces and rioters led to the death of an alleged gunman and police had been deployed in the area to arrest the perpetrators.

On 15 August, an alleged gunman was shot dead by the French police in the majority Kanak town of Thio, bringing the death toll during the unrest to 11.

In October 2024, the curfew was extended until 4 November. The curfew included a ban on the possession, purchase and transportation of firearms, the sale of alcohol, and a ban on public meetings and demonstrations in the Greater Nouméa area. In late October, a heavy security presence remained in force in Saint Louis and Route Provinciale 1.

On 3 December 2024, New Caledonia's High Commission lifted the territory's overnight curfew.

As of October 2025, tensions persisted despite dialogue as the pro-independence FLNKS rejected France’s delay of regional elections and demanded a vote on existing rolls, warning that repeated postponements and roll changes could reignite a May 2024-style unrest; although New Caledonian and French officials signed the Bougival Accord in July 2025 to create a “special-status state within France,” it has since stalled after FLNKS withdrew support amid internal rifts and a leadership shift from Emmanuel Tjibaou to Christian Tein, who was cleared of incitement charges in France but remains barred from returning to New Caledonia.

=== Loyalist militias ===
Armed loyalist militias formed to support police and to defend neighborhoods due to the perception that law enforcement was overwhelmed. Some loyalist militias also set up sniper positions on the rooftops. The High Commissioner of the Republic Louis Le Franc called upon the militias to stand down rather than to create a vicious circle of violence. The Field Action Coordination Unit accused loyalist militias of violence with the tacit complicity of the police.

== Trials ==
In October 2024, a number of separatists appeared at court in Paris over their alleged role in the unrest. On 22 October, the Court of Cassation announced that it would review the decision by judges in Nouméa to exile five pro-independence activists including CCAT leader Christian Tein without any adversarial debate and the conditions of their transfer to France. On 23 October, Tein's imprisonment was reversed by the Court of Cassation.

== Analysis and aftermath ==
According to Australian peace and conflict studies professor Nicole George and University of Pau and the Adour Region sociologist Évelyne Barthou, Kanaky youth played a major role in leading the protests and violence. George said that the protests were rooted in "the highly visible wealth disparities" in the territory which "fuel resentment and the profound racial inequalities that deprive Kanak youths of opportunity and contribute to their alienation." Similarly Barthou said that many Kanaky young people resented having to compete for limited opportunities with migrants from mainland France. Anthropologist Nathanaëlle Soler identifies the proximity of some of the Loyalist leaders, like Sonia Backès, as well as white militias, with far-right parties, and cites the unwillingness of the French government to recognize colonial history and the "pervasiveness of racism in Nouvelle-Caledonian society" as among the causes of the unrest. Former president Philippe Gomès identifies the economic downturn due to the collapse of the nickel industry, as "one of the main causes" of the strife.

=== Human rights violations and CNCDH report ===
A report released in February 2026 by the Commission nationale consultative des droits de l'homme (CNCDH) found that during the riots there had been "a worrying weakening of fundamental human rights, affecting the Kanak population in particular", with racial discrimination against Kanaks widespread and a number of instances reported of extrajudicial and collective punishment.

Particular violations and allegations raised in the CNCDH report included:

- Instances of "violent, often disproportionate repression by the police, particularly in the Southern Province and more specifically against the Kanak people". French forces reportedly employed "severe physical violence, including against minors, as well as deliberate destruction of property", and allegations were made that police had misused armoured vehicles and had fired upon civilians from helicopters.
- Discrimination against Kanaks in the domestic court system, with over 90 percent of the Camp Est prison population being Kanak and many held on remand without trial or accused of minor property offences. In contrast, no legal action was taken against Loyalist militias during the unrest.
- Targeting of Kanak leaders for extradition, who were flown to France and held in solitary confinement during pre-trial detention. Some transfers "allegedly violated the rights of the legal defence and took place in complete secrecy, even from relatives", with prosecutions subsequently abandoned without trial and detainees released "on French mainland territory, 17,000 kilometres from their homes, without winter clothing or return tickets".

== Casualties ==
As of 19 September 2024 thirteen people had been killed during shootings or police operations. A 14th person died during a traffic collision.

On 31 May, about 153 police officers were injured. Ten independence activists accused of organizing violence were placed under house arrest.

=== Deaths ===
On 15 May, a gendarme was seriously injured in Plum and died later in the same day. On 16 May, three Kanak civilians, including two teenagers and a man, were killed in Nouméa by unidentified armed civilians, while on the same day, another gendarme died of accidental gunshot wounds inflicted by another member of the security forces. On 18 May, a Caldoche man, aged 51, was killed in a gunfight in Kaala-Gomen, after firing on Kanak protestors as a result of rocks being thrown at his car at a roadblock, breaking a window. His son as well as two Kanak protestors were injured. On the same day, a motorcyclist died upon hitting a car wreck serving as a roadblock set up by Kanak protesters. On 24 May, a person was killed by a police officer who opened fire while being attacked by a group of around 15 rioters.

A 26-year-old man who was shot by gendarmes during a shootout on 3 June died of his injuries on 7 June. On 11 June, a 34-year-old man who was shot by a GIGN gendarme on 19 May in Dumbéa succumbed to his wounds. On 10 July, one person was fatally shot by police following a gun battle in Mont-Dore, bringing the death toll to 10. On 15 August, a protestor was killed by police during the blocking of a bridge in Thio. On 19 September, two pro-independence activists were killed during a police operation.

=== Indirect deaths ===
On 13 May, a pregnant woman due to give birth suffered a miscarriage due to the authorities not having been able to help her in time due to riots. On 15 May, a 40-year-old diabetic man died at his home, having not been able to receive dialysis in time due to riots. From 14 May to 28 May, an abnormally high amount of excess deaths due to natural causes were registered according to the Nouméa city morgue: 79 people in two weeks, nearly twice the normal figure for a two-week period.

== Impact ==
=== Economic impact ===
The looting and destruction cost on 16 May more than 200 million euros in damage. The cost increased to one billion euros on 21 May. More than 150 businesses were completely destroyed and around 1,500 jobs were lost. The riots have taken a heavy toll the New Caledonian economy, reducing its annual GDP by two percent. La Tontouta International Airport was closed for commercial flights from 14 May until 3 June. Full operations are expected to resume on 17 June. According to the Chamber of Commerce and Industry president, 80 to 90% of the grocery distribution network has been taken out. On 14 May the Nouméa bus network was suspended until further notice. The Médipôle main hospital was overwhelmed.

On 22 May, the Mayor of Nouméa reported that two primary schools and a car dealership containing 300 cars had been torched overnight. Police reported that 280 protesters had been arrested while local prosecutors reported that 400 shops and businesses had been damaged. In a month of riots, the toll was estimated at 900 businesses and 200 houses destroyed, 600 vehicles burned.

=== Social impact ===
On 17 May, it was announced that the Olympic Torch Relay for the 2024 Paris Olympics would not pass through New Caledonia on 11 June as had originally been planned.

Citing the ongoing unrest and the resulting decline of tourism demands, Aircalin announced in July that it would suspend its Tokyo-Narita route indefinitely from September, which led to New Caledonia's tourism board to close its Tokyo office as of that month.

The 2024 unrest has also accelerated emigration and workforce shortage issues in New Caledonia. Australian journalist Nic Maclellan wrote that the 2024 unrest could accelerate a trend of emigration and declining birth rates in the territory. According to figures released by the Institut de las statisque et des études économiques Nouvelle-Calédonie (ISEE-NC), New Caledonia's population dropped from 271,285 in 2019 to 268,510 in 2023. Between 2015 and 2022, 19,807 people, predominantly French nationals, emigrated from New Caledonia. Push factors for emigration have included New Caledonia's restrictive franchise law, economic uncertainty caused by the three independence referendums between 2018 and 2021 and difficulties faced by the territory's nickel industry. By late March 2025, La Tontouta International Airport, which is administered by the New Caledonian Chamber of Commerce and Industry (CCI), estimated that 10,700 people (mainly French nationals) had departed the territory in response to the "climate of insecurity and instability" created by the 2024 unrest.

In late July 2024, Nouvelle-Calédonie La Première reported that the New Caledonia Board of Physicians had received 78 requests for deregisteration since the start of the 2024 unrest, amounting to almost ten percent of the workforce. In June 2024, 30 physicians left the territory. On 20 September 2024, Radio New Zealand reported that France had deployed an emergency health contingent to the territory including two emergency specialists, four general practitioners, three oncologists and two pedo-psychiatrists to address the health workforce shortage. New Caledonia's nurses association vice-president François Delboy also estimated that half of the nursing workforce was planning to leave due to a surge in verbal abuse, physical attacks and thefts in the four months following the May unrest. By 28 March 2025, the French Medical Association of New Caledonia estimated that 20% of the territory's 1,000 registered doctors had left New Caledonia since the unrest began. ABC News reported that many French nurses had returned to metropolitan France after their contracts ended. Some neighbourhoods in Noumea lacked doctors since the remaining doctors had opted to move to safer neighbourhoods. A shortage of surgical nurses had led to the closure of some departments at Noumea's hospital and the suspension of some surgery services. In response, the health professional body Collectif Santé en danger proposed that the New Caledonian government use income tax exemptions to attract doctors and nurses back to the territory.

In late March 2025, ABC News reported that one in five New Caledonian workers (roughly 11,000 people) had lost all or part of their income since the 2024 crisis. ABC News also reported that more than half of these 11,000 people were still unemployed as of late March 2025.

== Alleged interference ==
=== Azerbaijan ===
On 16 May, French Interior Minister Gérald Darmanin accused Azerbaijan of interfering in the unrest by making a deal with independence advocates on France 2. Azerbaijan denied Darmanin's accusations. However, in July 2023, Azerbaijan had invited pro-independence activists from the French overseas territories of Martinique, French Guiana, New Caledonia and French Polynesia for a conference in Baku, which saw the creation of a "Baku Initiative Group" whose stated aim is to support "French liberation and anti-colonial movements." Azerbaijan has made increasingly unfriendly statements to France since October 2023, when France sold military equipment (including radar and missile systems) to Armenia. The Ministry of the Interior and VIGINUM also accused Azerbaijan of interference, by spreading disinformation on social networks to support the pro-independence activists.

On 6 June, Radio Free Europe/Radio Liberty reported that X accounts affiliated with several Azeri government and New Azerbaijan Party officials including Esmira Xalil, Rasadat Xaliqov, Ramila Seyidova, Anar Sahmurad, and Turkan Quliyeva had circulated anti-French disinformation and propaganda on the platform including allegations that French police had killed Kanaks.

=== Turkey ===
On 16 May, a report by French radio station Europe 1 also accused Turkey of interfering in a "circumstantial alliance of secret services to designate a common enemy" or steered by Russia and China to "open peripheral fronts, such as in New Caledonia, or to weaken the French state". An unnamed Turkish source was reportedly "amused by the unsubstantiated allegations" but did not expect Turkey to "formally repudiate" the claims.

== Responses ==
=== New Caledonia ===
In response to the unrest, pro-independence President of the Government of New Caledonia Louis Mapou called for a "return to reason". Meanwhile, the FLNKS called for "calm, peace, stability and reason", the lifting of blockades and the withdrawal of the controversial French constitutional amendments. He also appealed to French President Emmanuel Macron to prioritise a comprehensive agreement between "all political leaders of New Caledonia, to pave the way for the archipelago's long-term political future".

A group affiliated with the National Union for Independence (UNI) also stated they were "moved by and deplored the exactions and violence taking place". North Province provincial assembly UNI member Patricia Goa said it was "necessary to preserve all that we have built together for over thirty years and that the priority was to preserve peace, social cohesion".

Jacques Lalié, the anti-independence President of the Loyalty Islands Province, said absolute priority must be given to dialogue and the search for intelligence to reach a consensus. Louis Le Franc, the French High Commissioner to New Caledonia, told the media he would use military force "if necessary" and that reinforcements from metropolitan France would arrive on 16 May.

During a live event on the website X, anti-independence politician Deputy Nicolas Metzdorf, representative of New Caledonia's 2nd constituency, called on President Emmanuel Macron to keep the electoral reform going as doing otherwise would be a "political and moral defeat for the Republic". He also said the only present solution would be to put the territory under government tutelage and to become a department for two or three years.

On 22 May, the New Caledonian government confirmed that telecom services had thwarted an "unprecedented" mass email cyber attack on a New Caledonian internet provider, which occurred shortly after Macron had announced his visit to the territory. Activist Viro Xulue said that the climate of fear was exacerbated by "the anti-Kanak militia".

During Bastille Day on 14 July, Southern Province President Sonia Backès gave a controversial speech criticising the Nouméa Accord and advocating partitioning New Caledonia along provincial lines in light of the 2024 unrest. While Southern Province is ruled by pro-loyalist parties, the Northern and Loyalty Islands Provinces are ruled by pro-independence parties. Backès' speech was criticised by the pro-independence FLNKS political bureau spokesperson Aloisio Sako and Party of Kanak Liberation spokesperson Judickaël Selefen. By contrast, her speech was praised by vice-president of the Southern Province Virginie Ruffenach, who advocated a return to the provincial autonomy arrangement between 1988 and 1998.

On 29 August, the first Kanak President of the Congress of New Caledonia Roch Wamytan of the separatist FLNKS was replaced by Veylma Falaeo of the centrist Oceanian Awakening with a 28–26 vote.

On 22 October, the Congress of New Caledonia voted to postpone provincial elections scheduled for mid-December 2024 till at least 30 November 2025. This move was expected to be endorsed by the French Senate on 23 October and French National Assembly on 6 November.

On 9 January 2025, the New Caledonian Congress elected anti-independence Le Rassemblement legislator Alcide Paonga as its President following the collapse of the pro-independence government.

=== Metropolitan France ===
On 16 May, Emmanuel Macron indicated that he would delay convening the upcoming Congress of the French Parliament until at least June 2024 "to give a chance for dialogue and consensus". He also extended an invitation to New Caledonian political leaders to attend a meeting in Paris to cover various including the constitutional amendments around franchise extension and the current economic crisis in the nickel industry sector. The Paris meeting is scheduled to take place in late May 2024 under the supervision of French Prime Minister Gabriel Attal.

On 15 May, Attal deployed the army to protect ports and airports, and issued a ban on TikTok in response, which French authorities said had previously been used to organize riots. On 16 May, Macron declared a state of emergency in New Caledonia. By 17 May, the number of French police and gendarmes in New Caledonia had risen from 1,700 to 2,700. French forces were also deployed to supply food and medicine to the public while teams of mine clearing specialists were deployed to remove barricades that may have been booby trapped by activists.

On 19 May, Radio New Zealand reported that Attal was chairing daily meetings of an "inter-ministerial crisis cell" which included also Interior Minister Darmanin, Minister of the Overseas Marie Guévenoux, Minister of the Armed Forces Sébastien Lecornu and Minister of Justice Éric Dupond-Moretti. In addition, Attal also chaired a parliamentary "liaison committee" on New Caledonia on 17 May, which was attended by New Caledonian parliamentary representatives and parliamentary groups specialising on the Pacific territory. RNZ also reported that the French government had plans to send a "dialogue mission" to New Caledonia to restore dialogue and trust between Paris and the New Caledonians. On 19 May, French High Commissioner Louis Le Franc announced that 600 security personnel were being deployed in an operation to regain control of the highway area between Nouméa and its international airport including removing roadblocks and debris.

By 19 May, French forces had broken through 60 roadblocks along the Route Territorial 1. On 20 May, French High Commissioner Louis Le Franc announced that French security forces would be launching new raids against pro-independence strongholds across New Caledonia. Le Franc also confirmed that customs officials had secured 103 containers of food and medicine at Nouméa's port. On 21 May, the French government announced that Macron would visit New Caledonia the next day.

In early June 2024, French Interior Minister Gérald Darmanin confirmed that the National Gendarmerie had deployed several armoured vehicles known as "Centaurs" to New Caledonia for the purposes of breaking road blocks and reestablishing public order. These Centaur armoured cars can be equipped with machine guns and tear gas canisters. High Commissioner Louis Le Franc confirmed that voting for the 2024 European Parliament elections would go ahead in New Caledonia and that a curfew as well as a ban on the sales of firearms and alcohol would be imposed during the voting period.

In mid October 2024, French Minister of the Overseas François-Noël Buffet undertook a four-day visit to New Caledonia to urge both pro and anti-independence parties to return to dialogue. His visit also focused on the economic impact of the crisis and French socio-economic assistance to the territory. While pro-independence parties have favoured various degrees of independence including partnership with France, anti-independence parties were reluctant to commit to talks unless law and order was fully restored to New Caledonia. Following Buffet's return to France, President Macron chaired a high-level French government meeting that was attended by Buffet, Prime Minister Michel Barnier, President of the National Assembly Yaël Braun-Pivet and President of the Senate Gérard Larcher to discuss the views of both camps on the territory's future. Pivet and Larcher are expected to head a high-level delegation to the New Caledonia. Macron has also expressed interest in meeting with New Caledonian leaders in November 2024.

On 8 February 2025, Radio New Zealand reported that the French government and New Caledonia leaders were conducting talks remotely in Paris and Noumea to discuss a one billion Euro loan and a 201 million Euro grant to rebuild schools and other buildings destroyed during 2024 unrest. These funds had been approved as part of the French Parliament's 2025 budget but had been delayed due to political instability in France. The New Caledonian government has sought to convert the loan-based assistance into non-refundable grants in order to stave off the territory's unsustainable debt levels. In addition, French Overseas Minister Manuel Valls has engaged with both pro-independence and anti-independence New Caledonian leaders in a series of closed-doors bilateral exchanges in Paris since 4 February. The French government hopes that these talks will lead to a trilateral session involving France, pro-independence and anti-independence parties by 31 March 2025.

On 12 February, Valls confirmed that he would visit New Caledonia on 22 February to pursue talks on the territory's future. In mid February 2025, French ambassador to the Pacific Véronique Roger-Lacan confirmed that Valls would discuss unfreezing New Caledonia's electoral roll during talks in Nouméa. Valls's visit to New Caledonia took place between 22 February and 1 March 2025. During the visit, he convened a conference of both pro-independence and anti-independence parties. Following his visit, Valls published a "synthesis document" summing up both camps' views, which is intended to serve as the working basis for further talks. Valls confirmed that the parties had not yet reached an agreement. Valls subsequently returned for a second round of talks in late March 2025.

Following ten days of negotiations at a hotel in Bougival on the outskirts of Paris, pro and anti-independence parties reached a historical accord known as the "Agreement Project of the Future of New Caledonia" on 13 July under the auspices of the French President Macron. Under the accord, the territory would become a "State of New Caledonia" within France with dual citizenship. While New Caledonia would gain limited foreign affairs, policing and public order responsibilities, France would still retain responsibility for defence, currency and justice. In addition, New Caledonia's electoral roll would be opened to all New Caledonian residents born after 1998 and their descendants if they had resident in the territory continuously for ten years or were married or in a de-facto relationship with a qualified citizen for at least five years. New Caledonia would hold a referendum in February 2026 to approve the accord. If approved, the agreement would then be incorporated into a "special organic law" passed by the Congress of New Caledonia. The agreement would then have to be approved by the French Parliament and enshrined into the Constitution of France. The agreement would also focus on the territory's economic recovery following the unrest. Pro-French leaders including Nicolas Metzdorf and Le Rassemblement leader Virginie Ruffenach welcomed the agreement as a compromise framework that would New Caledonia to remain French. Meanwhile, the pro-independence Melanesian Progressive Union negotiator Victor Tutugoro and FLNKS chief negotiator Emmanuel Tjibaou also welcomed the agreement as a compromise in their long-term goal of achieving independence and self determination for New Caledonia.

=== Overseas France ===
On 19 May, the presidents of the regional councils of Guadeloupe, Martinique, French Guiana and Réunion as well as representatives from the same regions and French Polynesia, Saint Barthélemy and Saint Martin put out a statement calling the proposed modifications of the electoral corps without consultation of all involved parties a betrayal of the spirit and text of the Matignon and Nouméa Accords, demanding the immediate retreat of the changes as prerequisite for the restart of peaceful dialogue and denouncing the security measures taken by the government as repressive and risking the start of a spiral of violence.

Pro-independence activists in other overseas regions of France such as the Martinican Party for the Liberation from Martinique, the Decolonization and Social Emancipation Movement (MDES) from Guiana, as well as several Guadeloupean pro-independence organizations have expressed support for Kanak protestors.

Polynesian deputy member of the French National Assembly Tematai Le Gayic said: "That which calls out to me (...), is that this assembly that should, during this mandate, decide the constitutional future of my country doesn't recognize the position of the first peoples". While Guianan deputy Jean-Victor Castor warned: "We're not in the presence of a social movement similar to that set off by the pension reform law, we're dealing with a people demanding their full sovereignty" and "whether you want it or not, Kanaky was independent before the arrival of French colonists!."

=== International ===
==== Governments ====
- Australia: On 16 May, Foreign Minister Penny Wong called for calm, upgraded the level of caution in Australia's travel advice for New Caledonia and urged Australian travellers in the territory to "exercise a high degree of caution". Similar sentiments were echoed by Opposition foreign affairs spokesperson Simon Birmingham. On 18 May, Wong confirmed that Australia was working with French, New Caledonian and New Zealand authorities to evacuate Australians stranded in the territory. An estimated 3,200 tourists and other travellers including 300 Australians remain stranded in New Caledonia. On 20 May, Wong confirmed that the Australian Defence Force was ready to send planes to evacuate stranded tourists, pending approval from New Caledonian authorities and the resumption of commercial flights. The first of these flights departed on 21 May. The operation will repatriate 300 citizens who have registered with the Australian authorities for assistance in leaving New Caledonia.
- China: On 27 May, Foreign Ministry spokesperson Mao Ning confirmed that it was monitoring the situation in New Caledonia and had directed Chinese embassies in France, Australia, New Zealand and Singapore to assist with the evacuation of Chinese nationals stranded by the conflict. Eighteen Chinese nationals left the territory on 26 May with the assistance of the French Government.
- Cook Islands: On 15 May, Prime Minister and outgoing Pacific Islands Forum chair Mark Brown described the unrest as a "cause to recognise greater autonomy and greater independence from the people on those islands". He also stated that the Cook Islands would provide support assistance to Forum members New Caledonia and French Polynesia to avoid any escalation of conflict.
- Fiji and Papua New Guinea: On 22 June, the two governments introduced a motion to the United Nations Special Committee on Decolonization calling for peace in New Caledonia.
- New Zealand:
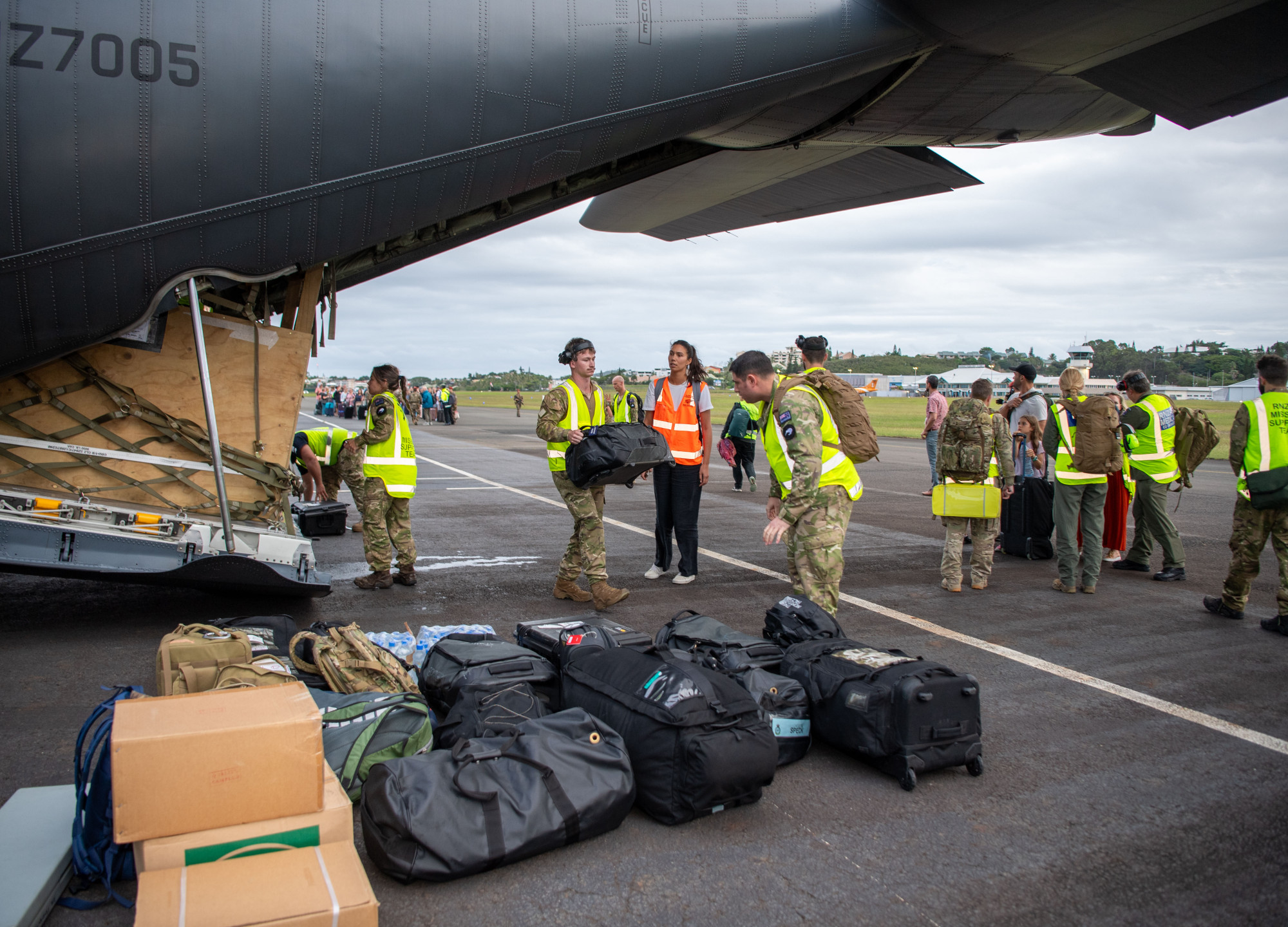
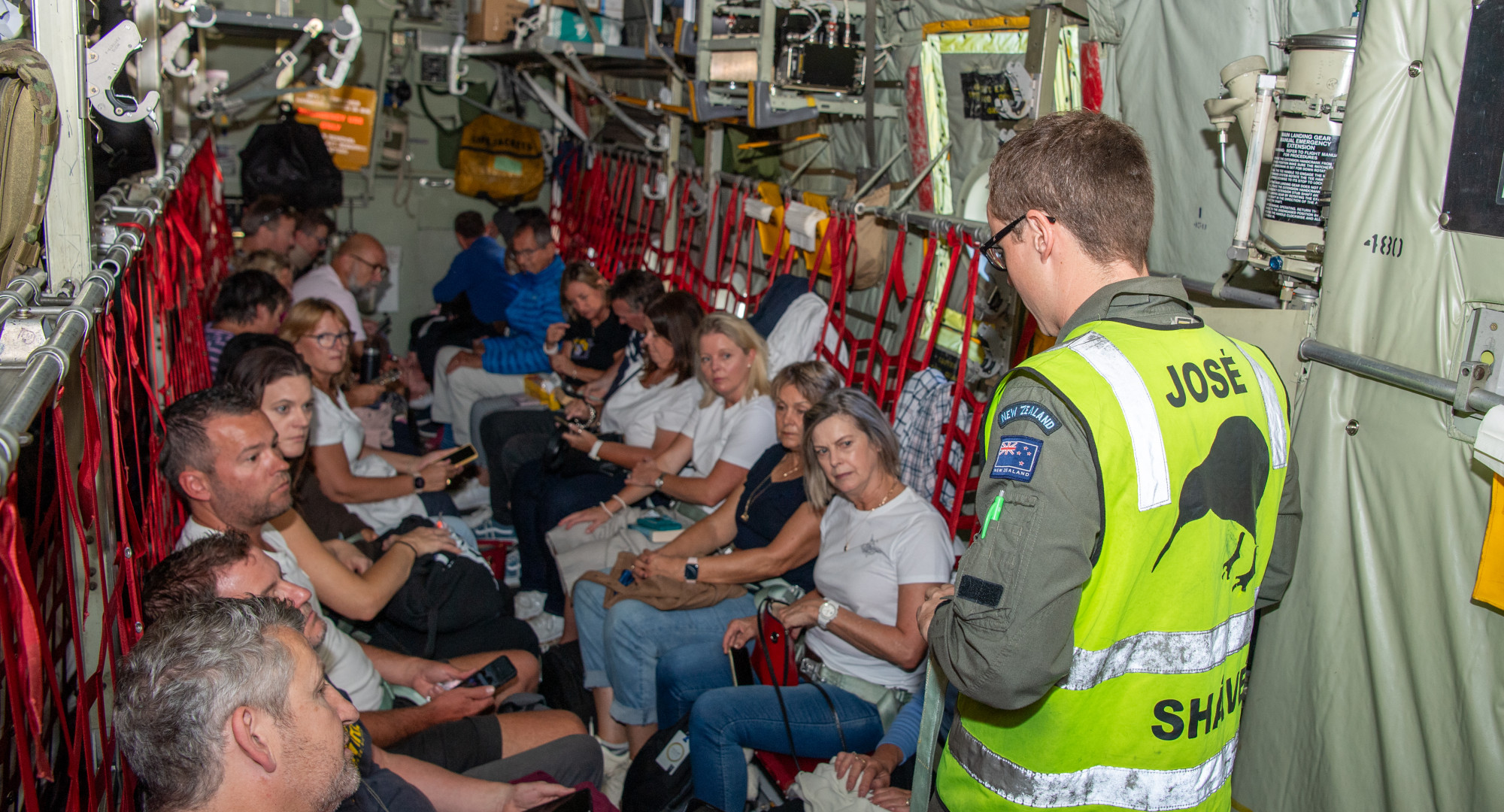
  RNZAF receiving New Zealanders and approved foreign nationals from New Caledonia
  On 14 May, Foreign Minister Winston Peters cancelled plans to visit New Caledonia in response to the unrest. National carrier Air New Zealand also stated it was monitoring the situation in the territory ahead of its next flight to Nouméa at 08:25 on 18 May. Following the closure of La Tontouta International Airport, the airline cancelled its flights to Nouméa scheduled for 18 and 20 May. The Ministry of Foreign Affairs and Trade confirmed that 219 New Zealanders were registered with Safe Travel in New Caledonia. Peters confirmed that the Government was exploring ways of evacuating New Zealanders including deploying the Royal New Zealand Air Force. While the New Zealand Consulate General remained open, staff were working remotely due to safety concerns. On 20 May New Zealand announced a flight on 21 May to evacuate 50 New Zealand nationals from Nouméa. On 21 May, Peters confirmed that an RNZAF Lockheed C-130 Hercules plane would be flying to New Caledonia to evacuate about 50 passengers, marking the first in a series of evacuation flights. On 23 May a further 50 passengers were repatriated back to Auckland on a RNZAF Boeing 757, who had travelled from Nouméa to Brisbane on a French-operated flight. On 24 May a third flight took place, returning another 50 New Zealanders on a C130. By 27 May, the NZDF had evacuated 300 people from New Caledonia. The final NZDF flight took place the following day on 28 May to evacuate about 20 New Zealand citizens.
- Russia: Foreign Ministry spokeswoman Maria Zakharova rejected claims of foreign interference in the New Caledonia unrest and urged France to "look at its own deep-down problems". Zakharova stated that Russia regarded New Caledonia as a non-self governing territory that had not yet completed the process of decolonisation and called on France to "refrain from an unjustified use of force against the protesters and respect the rights and liberties of the indigenous population of New Caledonia and other overseas territories under its control."
- Solomon Islands: Colin Beck, the Permanent Secretary of Foreign Affairs, said that using military force was not a method to resolve issues, and it could prevent indigenous Kanak people from expressing their rights.
- Vanuatu: On 17 May, Prime Minister Charlot Salwai, the concurrent Chair of the intergovernmental organization Melanesian Spearhead Group (MSG), reaffirmed the MSG's support for the FLNKS's opposition to France's constitutional bill "unfreezing" New Caledonia's electoral roll. It also opposed proposed changes to the citizens' electorate and the distribution of seats in New Caledonia's Congress. Salwai endorsed the FLNKS's call for calm and condemnation of violence. He also warned that the indiscriminate destruction of property would adversely affect New Caledonia's economy and the "welfare and lives of all New Caledonians, including the Kanaks."

==== Pacific Islands Forum ====
Following the outbreak of unrest, Vanuatu Prime Minister Charlot Salwai urged France to accept an FLNKS proposal to establish a "dialogue and mediation mission" to discuss how peace and normalcy could be restored to the territory. During the 10th Pacific Islands Leaders Meeting (PALM 10) in Tokyo in mid-July 2024, the Melanesian Spearhead Group issued a joint statement objecting to the "apparent militarisation" of New Caledonia. They said that the French National Assembly's passage of legislation to "unfreeze" the electoral roll for New Caledonia's provincial elections "precipitated the carnage that followed". They called on France to allow a joint UN-MSG mission to visit the territory and to hold another self-determination referendum. In response to the MSG's statement, senior French diplomat Véronique Roger-Lacan sought to reassure Pacific Islands Forum (PIF) leaders of the fairness of the 2021 New Caledonian independence referendum and claimed there was much disinformation about New Caledonia among Pacific countries. She criticised the PIF president Mark Brown's decision to contact New Caledonian President Louis Mapou while ignoring France, which she said still had sovereignty over the territory. Brown confirmed that the PIF was preparing to send a high-level Pacific delegation consisting of the leaders of Fiji, Cook Islands, Tonga and Solomon Islands to investigate conditions in New Caledonia.

On 30 August 2024, Brown confirmed that both the Pacific Island Forum and France had agreed to the terms of reference for a PIF fact finding mission to New Caledonia consisting of the Forum troika and Fijian President Sitiveni Rabuka. New Caledonia and French Polynesia have been members of the Forum since 2016. The fact finding mission had been requested by Mapou.

In late October 2024, the Pacific Islands Forum confirmed that its troika mission to New Caledonia would take place between 27 and 29 October. The Forum leaders would be supported by Forum Secretary General Baron Waqa and senior French and New Caledonian officials. The delegation toured Nouméa and visited New Caledonian political parties, youth, private sector, health and education leaders in order to understand local perspectives and help the Fourum support ongoing dialogue about the territory's future. At the request of the French government, the mission would remains trictly observational. On 29 October, New Caledonia President Mapou and government spokesperson Charles Wea welcomed the troika's visit. Protestant Church of Kanaky New Caledonia leader Billy Wetewea told the troika mission that the Kanaks were "battling inequities in education, employment and health". By contrast, the Loyalists claimed that the Kanaks were neither marginalised nor mistreated. The troika mission's findings are expected to be presented at the next Forum leaders' meeting in 2025.

==== United Nations ====
In mid-August 2024, United Nations special rapporteurs issued a statement accusing the French Government of seeking to dismantle the Nouméa Accord by seeking to unfreeze the electoral roll and introducing the "Marty project," which they claimed would dismnatle recognition of Kanak indigenous identity, customary law and land rights. The rapporteurs criticised the French Government for failing to respect the Kanaks' rights to participation, consultation and informed consent. They also expressed concern that French authorities had not taken action to disband and prosecute anti-independence settler militias. UN special rapporteurs are independent experts mandated by the United Nations Human Rights Council to report to the Office of the United Nations High Commissioner for Human Rights (OHCHR).

In mid-June 2024, the Fijian and Papuan governments had introduced a motion to the United Nations Special Committee on Decolonization calling for peace in New Caledonia. On 8 October 2024, the United Nations General Assembly Fourth Committee heard testimonies and submissions from both pro and anti-independence parties as well as the French Government. Claude Gambey, the chief of staff to the New Caledonian President, expressed hope for constructive dialogue between the two camps. Nicolas de Rivière, the Permanent Representative of France to the United Nations, reiterated France's committed to restoring peace in New Caledonia and providing financial assistance to the territory. Pro-independence representative Viro Xulue, the deputy secretary-general of the Customary Senate, petitioned the committee to recommend that France end its military occupation and hold a new independence referendum. Loyalist representatives including Sonia Backès, the President of the Southern Province, argued that French universalist ideas benefited the Kanaks and accused the pro-independence groups of instigating violence including arson attacks on schools.

In mid-October 2024, the New Caledonia unrest was the subject of the United Nations Human Rights Committee's five-yearly French human rights review in Geneva. Portuguese committee member Jose Santo Pais criticised what he regarded as France's heavy-handed response and questioned France's commitment to the UN Declaration on the Rights of Indigenous Peoples and the Nouméa Accord. Serbian committee member Tijana Surlan requested an update from France on investigations into injuries and fatalities "related to alleged excessive use of force" in the territory. Togorian committee member Kobauyah Tchamdja Kapatcha also asked about the alleged intimidation of five journalists by French authorities in New Caledonia. The French delegation led by French Ambassador for Human Rights Isabelle Lonvis-Rome defended the actions of French authorities in New Caledonia and rejected the jurisdiction of the United Nations' decolonization process into its Pacific territories.

==== Non-state organisations ====
- Amnesty International's Pacific Researcher Kate Schuetze issued a statement on 17 May calling on French authorities to uphold the rights of the Kanak people to freedom of expression and assembly amidst the unrest. Amnesty International also urged the French Government not to use the state of emergency, military deployment and the TikTok ban to restrict peoples' rights.
- The Catholic Archbishop of Nouméa Michel-Marie Calvet said during the Day of Pentecost Sunday mass that the community had "betrayed our faith, our baptism and Jesus through its divisions." He also called on the public and leaders to denounce violence and to work together for a "shared peaceful future, of lost and found fraternity".
- The Pacific Conference of Churches (PCC) expressed "deep solidarity" with the Kanak people, and called for the United Nations to send an "impartial and competent" dialogue mission to monitor the situation in New Caledonia.
- The alliance of Pacific Regional Non-Government Organisations (PRNGOs) condemned France for its "betrayal of the Kanaky people" and "agenda of prolonging colonial control over the territory". PRNGOs also called for the United Nations and the Pacific Islands Forum leaders to send a neutral mission to facilitate dialogue over the Nouméa Accords of 1998 and political process.
- Several Pacific NGOs including the Australia West Papua Association, the United Liberation Movement for West Papua (ULMWP), Kia Mua and the Oceanian Independence Movement (OIM) issued statements supporting the Kanak people and FLNKS, and condemning French colonialism and alleged racism.
- On 7 June, the Pacific Network on Globalisation (PANG) issued a statement criticising the French Government for using force to resolve the unrest. They called on the French Government to implement an Eminent Persons Group (EPG) to resolve the crisis peacefully and called for the abandonment of the controversial electoral legislation.
- On 13 June, a New Zealand opposition party Te Pāti Māori (Māori Party) issued a press release stating that it "stood with the people of Kanaky who are fighting for their independence and their lives against oppressive French occupation."

== See also ==
- 2021 New Caledonian independence referendum
- 2024 social unrest in Martinique
- Decolonisation of Oceania
- Demographic engineering
- Non-citizen suffrage
- Ouvéa cave hostage taking
- Separatism in the Faichuk Islands
- UN Special Committee on Decolonization: List of non-self-governing territories
