= Gil Brial =

French politician

Member of the New Caledonian Territorial Assembly
- Incumbent
- Assumed office 2009
- Constituency: South

Leader of the Caledonian People's Movement
- Incumbent
- Assumed office 2018
- Preceded by: Gael Yanno

Personal details
- Born: 27 November 1973 (age 52) Noumea, New Caledonia
- Party: Caledonian People's Movement (2013-); The Rally (2009-2013)
- Profession: Teacher

Gil Brial (born 25 November 1973) is a politician from New Caledonia who is the leader of the Caledonian People's Movement.

== Biography ==
Brial was born in New Caledonia in 1973 to a prominent political family. He is of mixed race, maternal Caldoche (New Caledonians descended from French colonial settlers) descent and paternal Polynesian-Wallisian origin with his father's family having origins in Wallis and Futuna and Uvea. His paternal grandmother was Aloisia Brial, the former ruler and queen of Uvea of the polity of Uvea. His cousins are French Les Républicains politicians Sylvain Brial and Victor Brial and his great-uncle was Benjamin Brial.

He studied at the University of Franche-Comté before studying for a higher qualification diploma in mechanical engineering at the University of the Mediterranean. He then worked as a teacher in Hienghène.

In 2009 he was elected to the New Caledonian Territorial Assembly as a member of The Rally but left the party in 2013 with its leader Gaël Yanno to form the Caledonian People's Movement. He assumed leadership of the party in 2018.

In June 2024, during the unrest, he was involved in the beating of a young off-duty Kanak policeman.
