= Caledonian People's Movement =

Caledonian People's Movement Mouvement Populaire Calédonien
- Leader: Gil Brial
- Party Spokesperson: Isabelle Champmoreau
- Founded: March 28, 2013
- Split from: The Rally
- Headquarters: Nouméa
- Ideology: Anti-separatism; Conservatism; Liberal conservatism Federalism
- Political position: Right-wing
- Regional affiliation: Les Loyalistes
- Colours: Blue
- Seats in the Congress: 2 / 54
- Seats in the South Province: 4 / 40
- Seats in the North Province: 0 / 40

Caledonian People's Movement (French: Mouvement Populaire Calédonien; abbreviated MPC) is a conservative and anti-separatist political party in New Caledonia founded in 2013 by Gaël Yanno, a former President of the Congress of New Caledonia and MP in the National Assembly of France representing the New Caledonia constituency.

== History ==
The party was founded in 2013 following an internal dispute within The Rally between leader Pierre Frogier and representatives Gaël Yanno and Sonia Backès. Yanno and Backès were both disappointed with Frogier's performance as leader, which they felt cost The Rally votes, and also disagreed on economic policy. Both subsequently left the party.

Yanno founded the MPC with similar ideas to the French Union for a Popular Movement. At its creation, the party issued a charter with two main points: opposing separatism and creating policies designed to improve the daily lives of all ethnic communities in New Caledonia. Yanno also said he was willing to work with all anti-separatist parties in New Caledonia. In 2018, Yanno stood down and was replaced by Gil Brial as leader.

In 2019, the party joined with the Caledonian Republicans and The Rally to form the Future with Confidence alliance.
