= 2021 New Caledonian independence referendum =

- 12 December 2021
- Do you want New Caledonia to attain full sovereignty and become independent?

Results
| Choice | Votes | % |
|---|---|---|
| Yes | 2,747 | 3.50% |
| No | 75,720 | 96.50% |
| Valid votes | 78,467 | 97.02% |
| Invalid or blank votes | 2,418 | 2.99% |
| Total votes | 80,881 | 100.00% |
| Registered voters/turnout | 184,364 | 43.87% |

An independence referendum was held in New Caledonia, a French territory in the South Pacific, on 12 December 2021. The vote was the third and final one to be held under the terms of the Nouméa Accord, following votes in 2018 and 2020.

As a result of the referendum taking place amid a boycott from the independence parties, the results were extremely lopsided in favor of status quo: voters overwhelmingly rejected independence, with 96% voting against independence and 4% in favour (compared to a 57% and 53% against independence in 2018 and 2020). The referendum took place amid a boycott from the indigenous Kanak population, whose leaders had called for the vote to be postponed following a large-scale COVID-19 outbreak beginning in September 2021 which caused a total of 280 deaths, and highlighted that Kanak mourning rituals lasted up to a year.

Pro-independence campaigners argued that the boycott was caused by the French authorities denying a request by indigenous leaders to postpone the referendum, as Kanak communities were disproportionately affected by the 280 deaths caused by the COVID-19 pandemic, with many still observing mourning rituals, and accused the authorities of rushing through the referendum at a time in which pro-independence campaigners and voters were hindered.

Emphasizing that the outbreak had declined significantly by mid-November, anti-independence campaigners accused independence supporters of using the pandemic to justify postponing a referendum they were fearful of losing, as it had cast the role of France in a good light following its dispatching of doctors and vaccine doses as well as injecting ten billion CFP francs into the local economy.

Turnout was estimated at only 44% of the electorate, compared to 86% in the 2020 referendum. Fearing unrest, the French government deployed 2,000 military personnel to New Caledonia for the vote, which ended up being carried out peacefully.

French President Emmanuel Macron celebrated the results of the referendum, adding that France "is more beautiful because New Caledonia has decided to stay part of it." Talking about the transition period now beginning, he described New Caledonia as now being "free from the binary choice of 'Yes' or 'No'", and urged for its politicians to begin "building a common project, while recognising and respecting the dignity of everyone".

Independence supporters called for participation in post-referendum discussion on the future status of New Caledonia. However, they refused to do so before the end of the French presidential election of April 2022. A transition period ensued, at the end of which a referendum on the new status of New Caledonia within France is expected.

== Background ==
New Caledonia was formally annexed by France in 1853, and Europeans and Polynesians, as well as other settlers, have since made the indigenous Kanaks a minority (27%, 11%, and 39% respectively in the 2014 census). The territory was used as a penal colony from 1864 to 1897, and the Kanaks were excluded from the French economy and mining work, and ultimately confined to reservations. Between 1976 and 1988, conflicts between the French government and the independence movement saw periods of serious violence and disorder (culminating in the Ouvéa cave hostage taking in 1988), with the emerging Kanak independence movement gaining support from many Kanaks frustrated with their lower socio-economic status and lack of involvement in the economy, seen as problems caused by the French exploitation. Though GDP per capita (nominal) is high at $38,921 and though New Caledonia is a major producer of nickel, there is significant inequality in income distribution, with many claiming that the mining revenue benefits people outside the territory and its (declining) mining communities.

Since 1986, the United Nations Committee on Decolonization has included New Caledonia on the United Nations list of non-self-governing territories. The 1987 New Caledonia independence referendum, the first independence referendum, was held the following year on 13 September 1987. However, independence was rejected by a large majority, with 842 people (1.7%) voting for independence and 48,611 people (98.3%) voting to remain a part of France. Many pro-independence groups, such as the Kanak and Socialist National Liberation Front (FLNKS), boycotted the vote.

The Matignon Agreements, signed on 26 June 1988 by Jean-Marie Tjibaou and Jacques Lafleur, set up a ten-year period of stability and made certain provisions for the Kanak population. The Nouméa Accord, signed 5 May 1998 by the French government and the main independence and anti-independence parties, set in motion a 20-year transition period that transferred certain powers to the local government and laid the groundwork for an independence referendum in 2018.

In accordance with the Nouméa Accord, New Caledonians were allowed up to three referendums on independence; the first in 2018, then two more in 2020 and 2022 if the previous ones had not resulted in independence, but one-third of members of the Congress of New Caledonia voted for another one. The first was held in November 2018, with voters rejecting independence by 56.7 percent.

In 2019 members of the Caledonian Union, Future with Confidence, the Kanak and Socialist National Liberation Front (FLNKS) and the National Union for Independence requested another referendum be held. This was held in 2020, with a narrower margin of victory for the anti-independence side.

Following a formal request by 26 members of the Congress, in April 2021 the French government agreed to another vote.

== Franchise ==
The referendum was held using a special electoral roll. Potential voters needed to be registered on the general electoral roll, and also had to meet one of the secondary criteria:

1. Was on the electoral roll for the 1998 referendum on the Nouméa Accord;
2. Qualified to be on the electoral roll for the 1998 referendum, but were not enrolled;
3. Failed to meet the requirements to be on the 1998 electoral roll solely due to absence related to family, medical or professional reasons;
4. Having civil customary status, or born in New Caledonia and have their material interests in the territory;
5. At least one parent born in New Caledonia and have their material interests in the territory;
6. At least 20 years of continuous residence in New Caledonia by 31 December 2014;
7. Born before 1 January 1989 and have had their residence in New Caledonia between 1988 and 1998;
8. Born after 31 December 1988 and reached voting age before the referendum, with at least one parent who was on the electoral roll (or qualified to do so) for the 1998 referendum.

As a consequence of these restrictions, in the 2018 referendum 35,948 registered voters on the general list (17% of the 210,105 total registered voters) were excluded from the vote. Vote restriction restricted the voting power of recent inhabitants—derogatively known as Zoreilles—and enlarges the voting power of native Kanaks, and was long sought after by the FLNKS. Indigenous leaders accused France of deliberately altering the electorate by seeking to grant voting rights to recently arrived settlers from France.

== COVID-19 pandemic and boycott ==
On 20 October 2021, the Kanak and Socialist National Liberation Front (FLNKS) called on the French government to postpone the independence referendum to 2022, saying that the Kanak population was in a state of mourning due to the significant COVID-19 infection rate and death toll with that community. The previous week, French High Commissioner Patrice Faure had conditioned the postponing to the health situation going "out of control". Kanaks have extensive mourning rituals lasting up to one year.

A total of 260 New Caledonians had died of COVID-19 following the archipelago's first surge of cases in early September, which prompted the local government to vote unanimously for compulsory vaccination of the entire adult population. The measure led to a full vaccination rate of 66.31% of eligible people vaccinated (75.58% partially vaccinated) and an important decrease of the incidence rate as of 28 October. Two months later, on the day of the referendum, a total of 280 people had died from COVID-19 on New Caledonia.

Anti-independence campaigners, also called loyalists, rejected calls for the referendum to be postponed, citing the territory's high vaccination rate and arguing that the pro-independence camp had earlier supported proceeding with the December referendum. Loyalists accused pro-independence campaigners of using the pandemic to justify postponing a referendum they feared losing, pointing out that the pandemic had cast the role of France in a good light following its dispatching of doctors and vaccine doses as well as injecting ten billion CFP francs to help the local economy. Loyalists rejected the importance placed on further campaigning in the month prior to the referendum, in light of the three years of consecutive referendums on the matter.

The FLNKS called for a boycott of the independence referendum and accused the French authorities and anti-independence forces of using the COVID-19 crisis to influence public opinion. Following this call, Faure announced on 26 October that 1,400 vaccinated police personnel, including 15 mobile units, would be dispatched from metropolitan France to ensure the security of the vote in December amidst fears of violence. In November 2021, "a group of 64 Pacific experts from around the world" signed an opinion piece in Le Monde calling for the French government to postpone the referendum, suggesting that failure to include the Kanak population could lead to a repeat of the civil unrest of the 1980s.

On 12 November, Faure confirmed that the independence referendum would still go ahead on 12 December considering the improvement of the epidemiological situation, with daily new infections having fallen to 40 from a peak of 272. While Faure's announcement was welcomed by anti-independence parties, pro-independence parties said that they would not recognise the results of the referendum.

Due to this, the FLNKS has stated that it will not recognize the referendum's result and will "challenge it publicly at the French national level, at the regional level of the Pacific and at the international level." The FLNKS called the French government's insistence on going through with the referendum a 'declaration of war'. Caroline Gravelat from the University of New Caledonia claimed that this was a political problem but would not affect the result, "because the gap between the ‘yes’ and ‘no’ votes would probably not have narrowed to the point that the ‘yes’ side would have won."

== Conduct ==
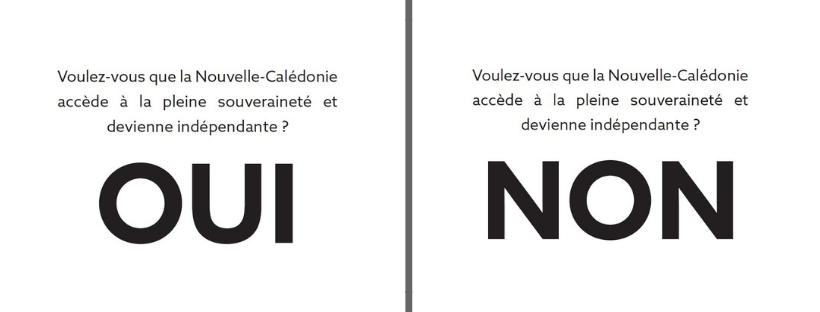
The question present on the voting ballots, using the same language as 2018 and 2021

While the 2020 referendum had witnessed intimidation and racist targeting of European-Caledonian voters by Kanaks in a few localities, no incidents took place in 2021. Beside the 2,000 gendarmes deployment, authorities prohibited the sale of alcohol and fuel on the voting day, as well as carrying arms.

== Results ==
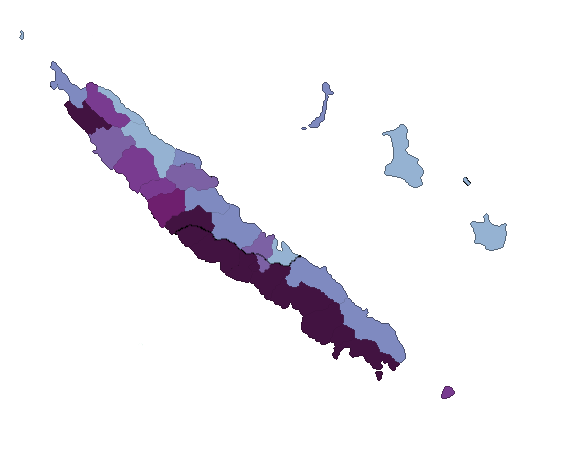
Turnout by municipality: Less than 5% Between 5 and 10% Between 10 and 20% Between 20 and 30% Between 30 and 50% More than 50%

As a result of the referendum taking place amid a boycott from the independence parties, the results were incredibly lopsided: voters overwhelmingly rejected independence, with 96.50% voting against independence and 3.50% for independence. Turnout was estimated to only account 43.87% of the electorate, down from the 85.69% that participated in the 2020 referendum due to the boycott.

| Choice | Votes | % |
|---|---|---|
| For | 2,747 | 3.50 |
| Against | 75,720 | 96.50 |
| Total | 78,467 | 100.00 |
| Valid votes | 78,467 | 97.02 |
| Invalid votes | 1,261 | 1.56 |
| Blank votes | 1,153 | 1.43 |
| Total votes | 80,881 | 100.00 |
| Registered voters/turnout | 184,364 | 43.87 |
Source: Government of New Caledonia

== Reactions ==
French President Emmanuel Macron celebrated the results of the referendum, saying that the country could be "proud" of the process designed to settle the status of the islands under which residents were asked in three separate referendums if they wished to break away from France. Macron added that "tonight France is more beautiful because New Caledonia has decided to stay part of it." Talking about the transition period now beginning, he described New Caledonia as being "free from the binary choice of 'Yes' or 'No'", and urged for its politicians to begin "building a common project, while recognising and respecting the dignity of everyone"

Independentist Roch Wamytan, who had signed the Nouméa accord as head of the FLNKS before later becoming President of the Congress of New Caledonia, declared the referendum non-existent, with only those held in 2018 and 2020 having juridical and political legitimacy. Assuring that Independentists would participate in post-referendum discussion on the future status of New Caledonia, he, however, reiterated the refusal to do so before the end of the French presidential election of April 2022.

President of independentist stronghold Loyalty Islands Province's assembly, Jacques Lalié, pointed out the persistence of two opposed blocs in New Caledonia, before calling for the population to understand future negotiations would now be centered on the relationship between the archipelago and France.

== Aftermath ==
A transition period was scheduled to take place until 30 June 2023, during which a referendum on the new status for New Caledonia within the French Republic would take place, but details had not been announced. Replacing the Nouméa Accord would require constitutional change. Possible changes suggested by French President Emmanuel Macron include unfreezing voter rolls, which make more French nationals eligible to vote.

The FLNKS has continued to reject the results, launching a failed challenge in court to the vote's validity on the basis of its low turnout. The Pacific Islands Forum found in a report that the results were "an inaccurate representation of the will of registered voters", but did not agree that the referendum should be annulled. In August 2023, the five members of the Melanesian Spearhead Group (four Pacific states and FLNKS) stated that based on the report by the Pacific Islands Forum, they did not believe the referendum was valid.

Following the 2024 New Caledonia unrest, New Zealand Foreign Minister Winston Peters made remarks in July 2024 questioning the legitimacy of the 2021 independence referendum due to the low 44% turnout, stating that "within the letter of the law ... but it was not within the spirit of it." Peters' remarks were criticised by French Ambassador to the Pacific Veronique Roger-Lacan, who accused him of interfering in an internal matter.

In July 2025 an agreement on the future status of the archipelago was reached between France, loyalists and pro-independence groups.

== See also ==
- 2024 New Caledonia unrest
- 2019 Bougainvillean independence referendum
- Proposed Chuukese independence referendum
- Decolonisation of Oceania
