= The Loyalists (New Caledonia) =

New Caledonian party coalition

The Loyalists Les Loyalistes
- Founded: 2020
- Preceded by: Future with Confidence
- Ideology: Anti-separatism; Conservatism; Liberal conservatism Factions: Gaullism; Multiracialism; Caldoche interests
- Political position: Centre-right
- National affiliation: Ensemble
- Members: Caledonian Republicans; Caledonian People's Movement; Générations NC; Caledonian Republican Movement
- Seats in the National Assembly: 1 / 2 (50%)
- Seats in the Senate: 0 / 2 (0%)
- Seats in the Congress: 18 / 54 (33%)
- Seats in the South Province: 23 / 40 (58%)
- Seats in the North Province: 1 / 22 (5%)
- Seats in the Loyalty Islands Province: 0 / 14 (0%)

The Loyalists (French: Les Loyalistes) is a coalition of anti-independence centrist and right-wing political parties in New Caledonia. The Loyalist coalition is led by Sonia Backès. The parties involved are the Caledonian Republicans, the Caledonian People's Movement (MPC), and Générations NC.

In a referendum, Future with Confidence, Générations NC, Tous Calédoniens, and the National Rally have decided to choose "The Loyalists" as its name and the slogan "Mon non est Nouvelle-Calédonie" ("My no is New Caledonia"). In December 2021, in the following referendum, they took the name "Les Voix du Non".

On April 13, 2022, a congress was held, and the group "The Loyalists" was created through 12 elected representatives of Congress, with all but one supporting the re-election of Emmanuel Macron for the second round of the presidential election of April 24, 2022. The group was chaired by Françoise Suve. Virginie Ruffenach declared on the same day that she remained head of the L’Avenir en confiance group.

In 2022, Sonia Backès, Naïa Wateou, Christopher Gygès, and Willy Gatuhau signed a column on behalf of the Caledonian Republicans, calling for them to not be forced to be supporters of Emmanuel Macron. The forum reads: "The three referendums closed the period of the Nouméa agreement. At the end of this process, France, like the international community, recognized the majority desire of Caledonians to remain French. [...]".

The MPC does not join the June 2022 legislative elections that were initiated by the Caledonian Republicans, Générations NC, and Caledonia Together, stating that they want a "broader union", including "all loyalist personalities". Emmanuel Macron lost his majority in France's lower-house National Assembly.

On 15 April 2024, during the unrest, The Loyalists and Le Rassemblement staged competing marches in Nouméa in response to the proposed French constitutional amendment to extend suffrage to those who had been residing in New Caledonia for an uninterrupted 10 years. The Loyalists have been advocating the government's proposal to open up the electorate. However, the former senator Pierre Frogier (Les Républicains) has argued for a partition of New Caledonia, with one electoral roll per province.
