= Renewed Caledonian Union =

Renewed Caledonian Union Union calédonienne Renouveau
- Founded: 2003
- Headquarters: Nouméa
- Ideology: Separatism; Melanesian socialism Christian democracy
- National affiliation: None, close to the Socialist Party
- Colours: Green
- Seats in the Congress: 1 / 54
- Seats in the South Province: 0 / 40
- Seats in the North Province: 0 / 22
- Seats in the Loyalty Islands Province: 1 / 14

The Renewed Caledonian Union (French: Union calédonienne Renouveau, UC-R) is a political party in New Caledonia formed by dissidents from the Caledonian Union. It is a member of the National Union for Independence (UNI) coalition, which is in turn a member of the Kanak and Socialist National Liberation Front (FLNKS).

In the latest legislative election of May 10, 2009, it participated in the National Union for Independence (UNI) list in the Loyalty Islands which won 24.66% of the popular vote and 4 seats, one of which was a member of the UC-R.

The party supports independence from and association with France.
