= Sonia Backès =

French politician

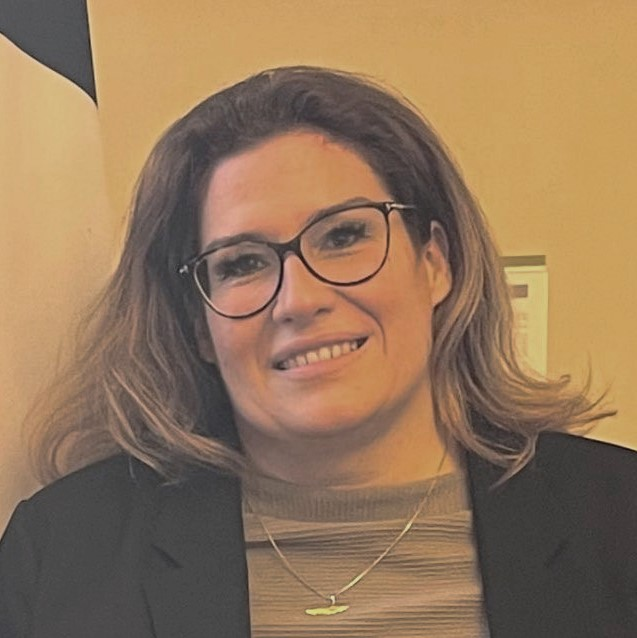

State Secretary for Citizenship
- In office 4 July 2022 – 10 October 2023
- Prime Minister: Élisabeth Borne
- Preceded by: Marlène Schiappa (office reestablished)
- Succeeded by: Sabrina Agresti-Roubache

President of the Assembly of South Province
- Incumbent
- Assumed office 17 May 2019
- Preceded by: Philippe Michel

Personal details
- Born: Sonia dos Santos; 21 May 1976 (age 50) Nouméa, New Caledonia
- Party: Caledonian Republicans (since 2017)
- Other political affiliations: Popular Caledonian Movement (2013–2015); The Rally–UMP (2004–2013); Rally for Caledonia in the Republic (1994–2004)

Sonia Backès (née dos Santos; born 21 May 1976) is a French politician in New Caledonia. She is the current leader of the Caledonian Republicans party and the President of the Provincial Assembly of South Province since 17 May 2019.

In July 2022, she was appointed Secretary of State for Citizenship in the Borne government. In September 2023, Backès resigned her ministerial position following her defeat in the 2023 Senate election.

A polarising figure in New Caledonian conservative politics, Backès is regarded as being fiercely loyalist, and is credited with having moved the Republicans to the right. In 2024, in regards to the debate around independence, she controversially claimed that like "oil and water", Kanaks and non-Kanaks could not coexist.

== Background ==
Born Sonia Dos Santos, she is the daughter of language teachers. Her grandparents on her father's side were Protestant émigrés from Portugal, fleeing Catholicism and the authoritarian Estado Novo regime of António de Oliveira Salazar, arriving in Nouméa in 1952. She attended the lycée Lapérouse de Nouméa, graduating in 1992. She joined the right-wing RPCR party (Rassemblement pour la Calédonie dans la République) in 1994 at the age of 18. She studied at the precursor of the University of New Caledonia (UNC), the Université française du Pacifique à Nouméa, also gaining a Masters in Mathematics from the University of Pau in France in 1997, and becoming a qualified computer engineer in 2001 after study at the Université Joseph-Fourier and the Institut polytechnique in Grenoble.

Her first job in Nouméa was at the government DTSI (direction des Technologies et Services de l'Information), while also teaching part time at the UNC. In the mid-2000s she worked in trades unions, notably for the CFE-CGC before quitting in 2008 to enter politics.

She is married to Éric Backès, and has two children.

== Political career ==
She has been associated with several political parties at territorial and provincial levels, holding portfolios ranging from education and schooling to energy, finance, taxation, the digital economy, and higher education. She was with the RPCR Rally for Caledonia in the Republic until 2004, then the Rassemblement-UMP (The Rally–UMP) (2004–2013). By 2012 she was part of a right faction within the UMP calling for a stronger commitment to anti-independence, or 'loyalist' values. She was suspended by Pierre Frogier in 2013, who said "your political line embodies all the conservatisms and all the archaisms by taking us back 25 years, far from the daring and innovative project that the Rassemblement carries today”. Gaël Yanno and his supporters, including Sonia Backès, created the Caledonian Popular Movement (MPC, Mouvement populaire calédonien) which then won the elections, placing her in a strong position. She moved into the Républicains de Nouvelle-Calédonie (LR-NC) from 2015 to 2017 and the Républicains calédoniens (RC) from 2017.

In 2019 she became President of the Provincial Assembly of South Province, a post that gave her considerable political clout.

== Leading figure in New Caledonia's pro-French camp ==
Like the majority of people of European descent living in New Caledonia, Backès remains strongly opposed to an independent New Caledonia, a goal supported by a large segment of the indigenous population. In the runup to a third referendum on independence from France (held in late 2021), she travelled to New York to address the United Nations on 17 June 2021, pleading unsuccessfully before the UN Special Committee on Decolonisation for the removal of New Caledonia from the list of non-self-governing territories arguing that “in New Caledonia, there is no longer an administering power and a colonised people.”

In July 2022, Backès, who had become a member of French President Macron’s Renaissance party, was appointed Secretary of State for Citizenship in Prime Minister Élisabeth Borne’s government. The following year, she decided to run for a New Caledonia seat in the September French senatorial elections. Although widely expected to win, she was soundly defeated by Robert Xowie, a pro-independence Indigenous Kanak leader. Soon afterward, she resigned her ministerial post.

During Bastille Day on 14 July 2024, Backès gave a controversial speech criticising the Nouméa Accord and advocating the partition of New Caledonia along provincial lines following the 2024 New Caledonia unrest. While Southern Province is ruled by pro-loyalist parties, the Northern and Loyalty Islands Provinces are ruled by pro-independence parties. Backès' speech was criticised by the pro-independence FLNKS political bureau spokesperson Aloisio Sako and Party of Kanak Liberation spokesperson Judickaël Selefen. By contrast, her speech was praised by vice-president of the Southern Province Virginie Ruffenach, who advocated a return to the provincial autonomy arrangement that began in 1988.
