= Bougival Accord =

2025 accord on New Caledonian status in France

The Bougival Accord (French: Accord de Bougival) of 2025 is an agreement between the French Republic, New Caledonian pro-independence activists, and New Caledonian loyalists, following the 2024 crisis in the archipelago. It was signed on 12 July 2025 in Bougival, France, by Manuel Valls, Minister of the Overseas, and by various leaders of the New Caledonian political parties. The official name of the agreement is the Project on an Agreement about the Future of New Caledonia (French: Projet d'accord sur l'avenir de la Nouvelle-Calédonie).

The agreement will have to be enshrined into the French Constitution by the parliament, and then, in February 2026, validated by a local referendum. However, the local referendum has been delayed indefinitely.

If accepted, the Bougival Accord will replace the Nouméa Accord and officially recognise a "State of New Caledonia" inside of France, giving the special collectivity the status of an associated state. Residents will have both French and New Caledonian nationalities. The Congress of New Caledonia will adopt a new "fundamental law". The French state will transfer some of its power to New Caledonia, including in diplomacy.

The agreement was expanded upon and further clarified in January 2026 with the adoption of the Elysée-Oudinot Accord. However, negotiations regarding the Bougival/Elysée-Oudinot Accords have since stalled.

== Context ==
The Bougival Accord was the result of ten days of negotiations between pro-independence and loyalist parties conducted under conditions of strict confidentiality at a hotel in the city of Bougival, on the outskirts of Paris. Those talks were convened by French President Emmanuel Macron after an earlier series of negotiations, held between February and May 2025, had failed to yield an agreement. After opening the summit on 2 July 2025, Macron handed day-to-day management of the talks to Minister for Overseas Manuel Valls. In his opening address, Macron stressed the need to restore New Caledonia's economy, which had been brought to its knees by destructive and deadly riots that erupted in May 2024. The Bougival summit was widely described at the time as a "summit of last chance." In 2024, following the riots, France had granted more than one billion euros in loans to allow New Caledonia's key public institutions to remain operational.

== Signatories ==
The accord was signed by almost twenty politicians drawn from both pro-independence and pro-France parties. Among the loyalist signatories were Nicolas Metzdorf, Sonia Backès, and Gil Brial. The pro-independence Kanak and Socialist National Liberation Front (FLNKS) was represented at the negotiating table by its chief negotiator Emmanuel Tjibaou. Victor Tutugoro of the Union Nationale pour l'Indépendance–Union Progressiste en Mélanésie also took part as one of the negotiators. Following the signing, President Macron received all delegation members at the Élysée Palace to congratulate them on their achievement.

== Content ==
- New Caledonian citizenship will be replaced by a New Caledonian nationality. This nationality will be given to any French nationals meeting one of the following criteria:
  - Being admitted to participate in the election of the provincial assemblies and the Congress of New Caledonia in 2026;
  - Being the child of a parent who meets the conditions for acquiring New Caledonian nationality;
  - Being born in New Caledonia to parents who do not meet the conditions for acquiring New Caledonian nationality and to reside there at the time of the application for nationality (duration to be set by the future constitution);
  - Having resided in New Caledonia for at least ten years at the time of the application for nationality (integration conditions to be defined by the future constitution);
  - Having been united for at least 5 years through marriage or a civil solidarity pact with a person holding New Caledonian nationality and to have resided in New Caledonia for at least five years at the time of the application.
- A constitution called the fundamental law will be adopted by the 6th legislature of the Congress of New Caledonia, which will be elected in May or June 2026.
- With a 36 members majority, the Congress of New Caledonia will be able to ask for a transfer of sovereign competency from the French state to the State of New Caledonia. Competencies that could be transferred include defense, currency, security and public order, justice, and legality oversight. In that case, a work committee between the Congress and the French state would be created to study the modalities of such a transfer. A joint project could then be proposed to the New Caledonian in a referendum.
- The French state will transfer foreign relations power to the State of New Caledonia, which will conduct diplomatic action with respect for international commitments and the fundamental interests of France (security, defense and vital interests). This transfer of power could potentially allow for New Caledonia's accession as a member state of the United Nations.
- The French state will stay in charge of security and public order, but a customary police force will be created to enforce rules in customary land. Provinces will also be authorized to create a police force.
- Nickel, which is regarded as the backbone of New Caledonia's economy, was addressed in the accord through a "strategic plan" aimed at restarting processing plants in the Northern Province and facilitating the export of raw nickel ore. The accord also expressed a commitment that France would lobby the European Union to include New Caledonian nickel on its list of strategic resources. The industry had been in a state of near-collapse even before 2024, partly due to competition from Indonesia's growing prominence in world nickel production and the high cost of local energy.

== Referendum ==
In New Caledonia there were three independence referendums between 2018 and 2021 under the Nouméa Accord. These were held so that the Caledonian people could choose whether to stay part of France or to become an independent country. The 2018 and 2020, referendums were rejected by small margins, but in 2021 it was overwhelmingly rejected by 96.5%. The result was due to a boycott by many indigenous Kanak voters. The referendums were limited to long-term residents to protect Kanak influence, but the 2021 boycott led to disputes over the vote's fairness. Since then, political tensions remain, as France has proposed reforms to expand voter eligibility, which independence supporters fear will weaken Kanak rights. Overall, the referendums show deep divisions in New Caledonia's society and its uncertain future relationship with France.

== Reactions ==
The French president, Emmanuel Macron, praised the agreement as "historic".

French Prime Minister François Bayrou also expressed pride at the agreement's conclusion, describing it as being "on par with history."

Emmanuel Tjibaou, pro-independence deputy, considered that while "this text does not mention the word independence, it opens a structured, progressive, legally regulated and politically legitimate path" to achieve it.

Nicolas Metzdorf, loyalist deputy, said that his group "had to make significant concessions to achieve these gains" but is still "satisfied because it is a status within France", because no new independence referendum will be organised, and because of the "increase in the seats of the South Province in Congress".

== See also ==
- New Caledonia
