= Future with Confidence =

Political alliance in New Caledonia

Future with Confidence L'Avenir en confiance
- Abbreviation: AEC
- Deputy Leader: Virginie Ruffenach
- Founded: 20 February 2019
- Dissolved: c. 2020
- Merger of: FPU, UCF
- Succeeded by: Les Loyalistes
- Ideology: Anti-separatism; Conservatism; Liberal conservatism Factions: Gaullism; Multiracialism; Caldoche interests
- Political position: Centre-right
- Members: Caledonian Republicans, The Rally, Caledonian People's Movement (MPC), All Caledonians

Website
- lavenirenconfiance.nc

The Future with Confidence (French: L'Avenir en confiance, AEC) was a liberal-conservative and anti-independence electoral alliance of political parties in New Caledonia. It formed part of the anti-separatist and French loyalist bloc in the Congress of New Caledonia.

The alliance was founded in February 2019 as a common list for the 2019 New Caledonian legislative election and contains an amalgamation of four political parties which include: The Caledonian Republicans, The Rally, The Caledonian People's Movement (MPC) and All Caledonians. The National Rally later became affiliated to the group.

Ideologically, the group held the common aim of opposing separatist and nationalist movements in New Caledonia by supporting New Caledonia's status as part of overseas France. It supported the Nouméa Accord but endorsed a No vote in each independence referendum and urged for the referendums to be held rapidly in order to create a coherent anti-separatist campaign before each. Additionally, the group supported strict policies on security and law & order, and for all groups in New Caledonia to be respected and have rights.

In 2022, the group ran into internal conflict during the 2022 French presidential election and legislative elections over whether to endorse Emmanuel Macron for another term. The National Rally supported the candidacy of Marine Le Pen while Générations NC and the Caledonia Republicans supported Macron's party. Gil Brial and Isabelle Champmoreau of the Caledonian People's Movement expressed interest in forming a new alliance focused on New Caledonian politics over that of mainland France. In 2023, the group split with the National Rally remaining the sole member.
