= States of emergency in France =

Provision for special executive powers in France

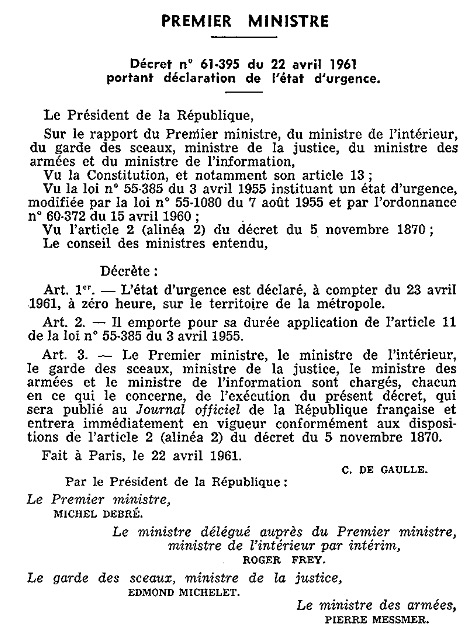
Decree to declare the state of emergency on 22 April 1961

States of emergency in France (French: état d'urgence) are dispositions to grant special powers to the executive branch in case of exceptional circumstances.

Four main provisions concern various kinds of "states of emergency" in France: two of those stem from the Constitution of France, and the other two from a statute:

- Article 16 of the Constitution provides the President of France with "exceptional powers" (Pouvoirs exceptionnels) in times of acute crisis.
- Article 36 of the same constitution regulates "state of siege" (état de siège).
- The Act of 3 April 1955 allows the president to declare a "state of emergency".
- The Act of 23 March 2020 allows the declaration of a "sanitary state of emergency", which allows the Prime Minister of France to take measures to protect public health during an epidemic, pandemic or health disaster endangering the country.

There are distinctions between article 16, article 36, and the 1955 Act, which concern mainly the distribution of powers. These dispositions have been used at various times, in 1955, 1958, 1961, 1988, 2005, 2015 and 2017.

== Legal framework ==
The French constitution, adopted in October 1958, was drafted taking into account the difficulties experienced by the executive in 1940 during the Battle of France and the contemporary state of affairs, namely the Algerian war.

=== Article 16 of the Constitution – Pouvoirs exceptionnels ===
Article 16 of the constitution grants the President of France "extraordinary powers" in exceptional cases, leading to an effective "state of exception":

When the institutions of the Republic, the independence of the nation, the integrity of its territory, or the fulfillment of its international commitments are under grave and immediate threat and when the proper functioning of the constitutional governmental authorities is interrupted, the President of the Republic shall take the measures demanded by these circumstances after official consultation with the Prime Minister, the presidents of the Assemblies, and the Constitutional Council.

He shall inform the nation of these measures by a message.

These measures must be prompted by a will to ensure within the shortest possible time that the constitutional governmental authorities have the means of fulfilling their duties. The Constitutional Council shall be consulted with regard to such measures.

Parliament shall meet ipso jure.

The National Assembly may not be dissolved during the exercise of emergency powers.

After thirty days of the exercise of the exceptional powers, the Constitutional Council can be referred to by the President of the National Assembly, the President of the Senate, sixty députés or sénateurs (members of each chamber), to determine if the conditions provided in the first paragraph are still met. The Council shall rule in the shortest time possible by a public ruling. The Council rules ipso jure and rules in the same conditions after sixty days of the exercise of the exceptional powers and at any moment beyond this period.

The conditions are both that the state is confronted with exceptional circumstances and that the regular institutions are disrupted and cannot govern effectively. This article of the constitution of the French Fifth Republic has been qualified as "liberticide" by critics. Invoked on 23 April 1961 during the Algerian War; normal functioning of institutions was quickly restored.

In the judgment Rubin de Servens of 2 March 1962, the Council of State judged that it could not itself invoke Article 16, as that constituted an "act of government". Furthermore, the State Council considered that it could only pronounce on rulings which were not legislative acts carried out during this period. Thus, a legislative measure (although the role of Parliament is not specified, just that it is not to be dissolved) which breaches fundamental liberties cannot be appealed against before the State Council.

In 1972, the Common Programme of the Left (issued from an alliance between the Socialist Party and the Communist Party) proposed to repeal Article 16. However, François Mitterrand's programme for the socialist presidential campaign in 1981, that he eventually won, did not include this proposition. In 1992, the socialist government of Pierre Bérégovoy proposed to amend this article during a project of constitutional reform; however, the project was not implemented. Also in 1992, the Vedel Commission, created by François Mitterrand, proposed to give to the Conseil Constitutionnel (Constitutional Council), on the concerted initiative of the president of the Republic and the presidents of both chambers (the Assemblée nationale and the Sénat), the mission to determine that the conditions required for the use of Article 16 were, in fact, met.

On 23 July 2008, a constitutional act was passed which, among other amendments, added a paragraph to Article 16 of the constitution which stated that after 30 days the Constitutional Council can be requested to determine in a public ruling whether or not the conditions that justified the use of Article 16 are still current. At any time beyond 60 days, the Council rules on this issue without the need for a referral.

=== Article 36 of the Constitution – État de siège ===
Article 36 of the constitution is concerned with the state of siege (État de siège (France), which can be decreed by the president in the Council of Ministers for a period of twelve days and which can only be extended with the approval of Parliament. A state of siege may be declared in case of an "imminent peril resulting from a foreign war [guerre étrangère, or simply "war"] or an armed rebellion (une insurrection à main armée).

Military authorities may take police powers if they judge it necessary. Fundamental liberties may be restricted, such as the right of association, legalization of searches in private places day and night, the power to expel people who have been condemned for common law matters or people who do not have the right of residence in the territory, etc.

=== Statute provisions – État d'urgence ===
The state of emergency in France is framed by the Law n°55-385 of 3 April 1955 (pre-dating the constitution of the Fifth Republic) and modeled on the "état de siège". It was created in the context of the Algerian War, to allow the authorities to manage the crisis without having to declare the "état de siège", which allows the military to take over a large part of the civilian authorities and which was conceived for wartime.

The 1955 statute states that the state of emergency can be decreed by the president in the Council of Ministers. The decision to proclaim the state of emergency can only last for 12 days. To extend the state of emergency for a longer period of time necessitates a law passed regularly through the Parliament.

Proclaiming the state of emergency gives exceptional powers to the Minister of the Interior and to prefects. The Minister can pronounce house arrests. The prefects can regulate or forbid circulation and gathering in some areas: the power of curfew, which mayors can pronounce for the territory of their city independently of the state of emergency, is extended to prefects.

The Minister and the prefects can, for the part of the territory concerned by the state of emergency, order places of gathering to be closed. Authorities can also order that legally-detained weapons be relinquished to them. There is no need for the administration to motivate its decisions: house arrests or decisions forbidding someone to enter a defined area can be appealed.

All of those powers are not enacted by the simple proclamation of the state of emergency but may be decided by the authorities if the need arises.

If the decree, or later, the law, says so, the authorities can:

- conduct administrative searches and seizures, day and night, without judiciary oversight,
- censor the press, radio, films, and theater representations.

Article 12 of the 1955 law allows, if a decree specifically provides it, the transfer of some crimes from the judicial jurisdiction to that of the military.

This law is modeled after the society of the time, to deal with a specific crisis, and its objective was to prevent a civil war or very severe unrest emanating from a part of the population. Some parts have since become obsolete:

- politically, censorship is not as acceptable in the twenty-first century as it was at the time the law (which mentions neither television nor the internet) was passed;
- administrative search and seizures must now be submitted to judicial oversight;
- the 2012 law on gun control has rendered partly obsolete the possibility of a decree requiring citizens to relinquish legally-owned weapons, which were more common in the aftermath of World War II;
- various terrorism laws have strengthened the criminal procedure since the 1980s: the powers available to the police and judges when investigating acts of terrorism are more extensive than those described in the 1955 law.

=== Sanitary state of emergency ===
To control the COVID-19 pandemic in France, the Parliament created a sanitary state of emergency (état d'urgence sanitaire). To protect public health, the prime minister can:

- regulate or prohibit the movement of people and vehicles and regulate access to public transport and the conditions of their use;
- prohibit people from leaving their homes, except for necessary travel such as for medical or important familial appointments;
- order measures aimed at the quarantine of persons likely to be affected;
- order measures to place and keep in quarantine, at their home or any other suitable accommodation, the affected people;
- order the provisional closure and regulate the opening, including the conditions of access and presence, of one or more categories of establishments open to the public as well as meeting places, guaranteeing the access of people to goods and basic necessities;
- place restrictions on the freedom of assembly;
- order the requisition of all persons (mandatory service) and all goods and services necessary to combat the health disaster;
- take temporary measures to control the prices of certain products;
- take all measures to make available to patients appropriate medicines for the eradication of the health disaster;
- take any other regulatory measure limiting the freedom to conduct business.

This state of emergency is framed by the law of 23 March 2020 and can be declared in the Council of Ministers for a period of 2 months. Extensions to this must be voted for by Parliament.

== Historical uses ==
Since 1955, a state of emergency has been decreed seven times:

- In 1955 during the Algerian War;
- In 1958, due to the May uprising in Algeria;
- In 1961, after the Algiers putsch of 1961 with the invocation of article 16 from 23 April to 29 September 1961;
- In 1984, in New Caledonia, amidst calls for independence in the territory around the 1984 New Caledonian legislative election;
- During the 2005 civil unrest in France, President Jacques Chirac declared a state of emergency on 8 November 2005. It was extended for three months on 16 November by Parliament, which was dominated by the UMP majority. On 10 December 2005 France's highest administrative body, the Council of State, ruled that the three-month state of emergency decreed to guarantee calm following the unrest was legal. It rejected a complaint from 74 law professors and the Green party challenging the necessity of the state of emergency and stating that it compromised fundamental liberties. In its rejection the council of state declared that the conditions that led to the unrest (which began on 27 October), the rapid spread of violence, and the possibility that it could recur justified the state of emergency.
- On 13 November 2015, a state of emergency was declared following the November 2015 Paris attacks. It expired, after five extensions, in November 2017. As of 23 July 2016, almost 3,600 houses had been raided under the state of emergency, leading to more than 400 arrests, the seizure of more than 500 weapons including 40 war weapons, and four or five of these raids led to a terrorism-linked judicial investigation. Some Muslim rights groups criticized the raids as unfairly targeting French Muslims, especially those of North African descent, claiming that they are conducted with little concern for civil rights, and pointing out that only one terrorism-related investigation had led to prosecution by August 2016. On 16 November 2016, President François Hollande and Prime Minister Manuel Valls announced that the state of emergency would be extended until the 2017 French presidential election, stating that the measure would be necessary to protect rallies and other events during the electoral campaign. In the run up to his election as President, Emmanuel Macron stated that he would make a decision regarding the state of emergency once he had been briefed by the security services. On 24 May 2017, following a security meeting held to discuss the situation after the Manchester Arena bombing in England, he announced that he would ask parliament to extend the state of emergency until November 2017. This was approved by Parliament on 6 July 2017, extending the state of emergency until 1 November. New counter-terrorism legislation was approved on 3 October to supersede the state of emergency, which came to an end on 1 November.
- On 16 May 2024, President Emmanuel Macron declared a state of emergency in New Caledonia following violent protests.
