= Colin Beck (diplomat) =

Solomon Islands diplomat

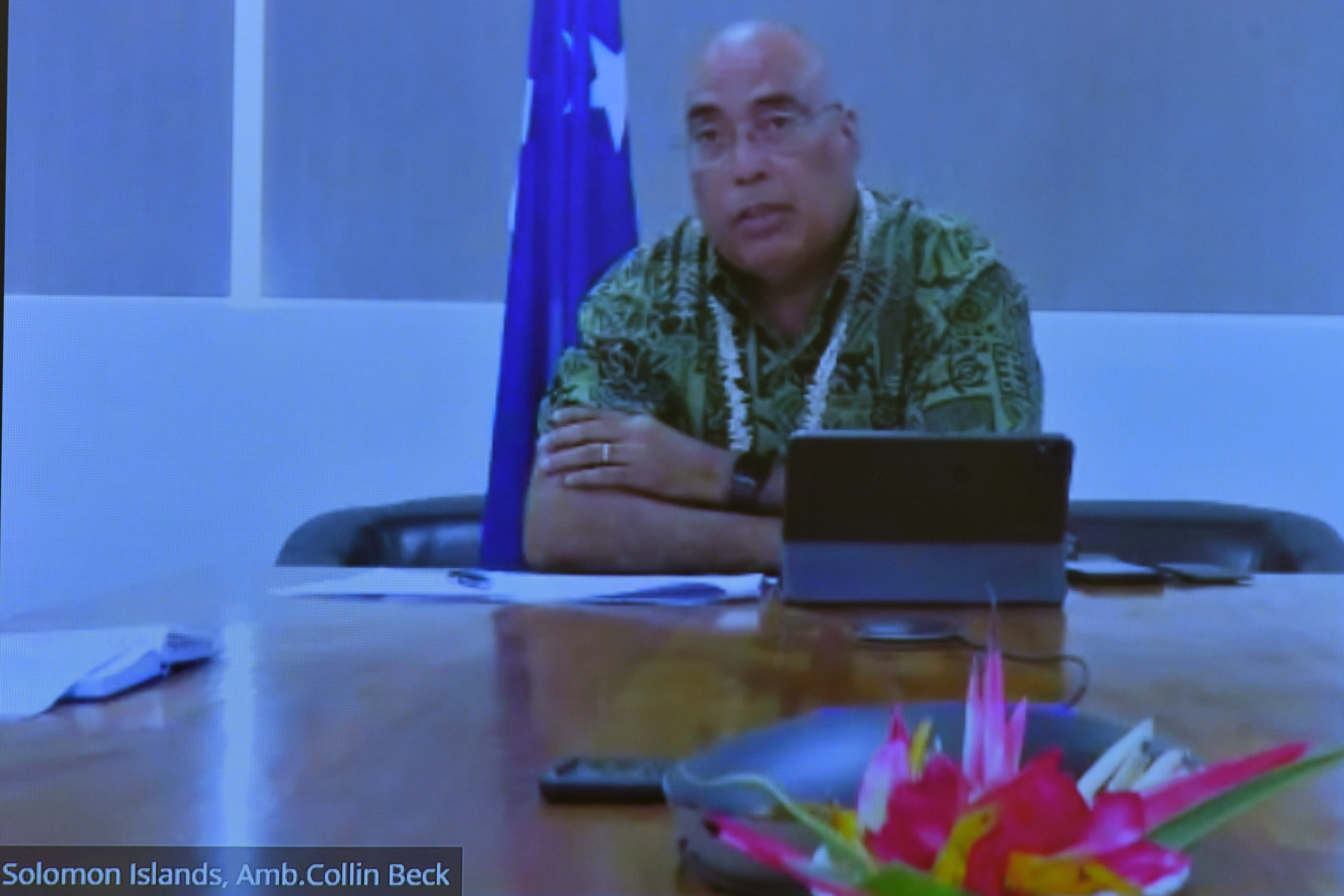

Permanent Secretary of the Ministry of Foreign Affaris and External Trade
- In office 2018–2026

Personal details
- Born: 23 June 1964
- Children: 2

Colin Beck is a Solomon Islands public servant and diplomat who previously served as the permanent secretary of the Ministry of Foreign Affairs and External Trade. He has previously served as the Solomons' permanent representative to the United Nations and ambassador to the United States, Cuba, Canada and Australia

Collin is married to Helen Beck.

== Early life and education ==
Beck attended high school at King George IV in 1978, and later studied at the University of South Pacific in 1983.

He also holds a master's degree in International Relations and Asian Politics from the University of Queensland, which he attended in 1998.

== Career ==
Beck is a career diplomat who commenced his service with the Ministry of Foreign Affairs and External Trade in 1988. During the 1990s, he served as Counselor to Solomon Islands Permanent Mission to the European Union.

From November 2003, Beck served as Solomon Islands Permanent representative at the United Nations until August 2016. During this time, he also served a one-year term from 2008 to 2009 as vice-president-elect of the 63rd Session of the United Nations General Assembly. As his country's representative in the United Nations, he spearheaded the motion which led to the United Nations General Assembly re-inscribing French Polynesia on the United Nations list of non-self-governing territories in May 2013.

On March 31, 2004, Beck was appointed Solomon Islands ambassador to the United States. From 2004 to 2016, Beck served as Solomon Islands ambassador to the United States, Canada and Cuba.

In 2016, Beck was appointed High Commissioner to Australia. A position held until his appointment as Permanent Secretary of the Ministry of Foreign Affairs and External Trade in 2018.

In 2022, Beck was reappointed to lead the Ministry for a second term. He was sworn in at Government house on 21 November 2022.

In June 2026, Beck was terminated as Permanent Secretary of the Ministry of Foreign Affairs and External Trade.
