= President of the Congress of New Caledonia =

- Incumbent; Virginie Ruffenach since 10 July 2026
- Residence: Nouméa, South Province
- Appointer: Congress of New Caledonia
- Term length: 1 year
- Formation: 7 October 1985
- First holder: Dick Ukeiwé
- Website: http://www.congres.nc/assemblee/son-organisation/le-president/

This article lists the presidents of the Congress of New Caledonia since 1985. The President serves as the head, or speaker, of the Congress of New Caledonia.

== Presidents of the Territorial Assembly ==
Took office	Left office	President
1957	1960	Armand Ohlen
1960	1961	René Hénin
1961	1966	Antoine Griscelli
1966	1970	Armand Ohlen
1970	1972	Jean Lèques
1972	1973	Michel Kauma
1973	1975	Yann Celene Uregei
1975	1976	Dick Ukeiwé
1976	1977	Rock Pidjot
1977	1978	Dick Ukeiwé
1978	1980	Jean-Pierre Aïfa
1980	1981	Jean Lèques
1981	1982	Jean-Pierre Aïfa
1982	1983	Jean Lèques
1983	1984	Jean-Pierre Aïfa

== Presidents of the Congress ==
Took office	Left office	President	Notes	Party
7 October 1985	2 May 1988	Dick Ukeiwé		The Rally
2 May 1988	11 June 1989	Albert Etuve		The Rally
28 June 1989	7 July 1995	Simon Loueckhote		The Rally
31 July 1995	16 July 1997	Pierre Frogier		The Rally
16 July 1997	3 June 1998	Harold Martin		The Rally
3 June 1998	10 July 2004	Simon Loueckhote		The Rally
21 July 2004	3 July 2007	Harold Martin		Future Together
31 July 2007	10 May 2009	Pierre Frogier		The Rally
22 May 2009	3 March 2011	Harold Martin		Future Together
1 April 2011	29 August 2012	Roch Wamytan		FLNKS
29 August 2012	7 August 2013	Gérard Poadja		Caledonia Together
7 August 2013	23 May 2014	Roch Wamytan		FLNKS
23 May 2014	17 July 2015	Gaël Yanno		Caledonian People's Movement
17 July 2015	30 July 2018	Thierry Santa		The Rally
30 July 2018	24 May 2019	Gaël Yanno		Caledonian People's Movement
24 May 2019	31 August 2024	Roch Wamytan		FLNKS
31 August 2024	10 July 2026	Veylma Falaeo		Oceanian Awakening
10 July 2026		Virginie Ruffenach		The Rally

== See also ==
- Politics of New Caledonia
