= National Rally (New Caledonia) =

National Rally La fédération du Rassemblement National
- Leader: Alain Descombels
- Vice President: Guy-Olivier Cuénot
- Founded: April 16, 1984
- Headquarters: 22 Rue Auer Ducos, 98800 Nouméa
- Ideology: Anti-separatism; French nationalism Centralism; Right-wing populism
- Political position: Right-wing to far-right
- National affiliation: National Rally
- Regional affiliation: Future with Confidence (2019-2020); Les Loyalistes (2020-2022)
- European affiliation: Identity and Democracy
- European Parliament group: Identity and Democracy Party
- Colours: Blue
- Seats in the Congress: 1 / 54
- Seats in the South Province: 1 / 40
- Seats in the North Province: 0 / 40

The Federation of The National Rally (French: La fédération du Rassemblement national; abbreviated RN) formerly known as the National Front is a political party that acts as the regional wing of the French National Rally in the French Overseas Territory of New Caledonia. It is currently led by businessman and former Caledonia Together politician Alain Descombels.

The RN is a loyalist party, opposing both the full independence of New Caledonia and concessions towards Kanak nationalist forces. Unlike other anti-separatist parties represented in the Congress of New Caledonia which exist as independent entities affiliated to parties in metropolitan France, the RN of New Caledonia functions as an extension of the same party in France.

== History ==
The New Caledonia federation of the National Front was created in 1984 in response to growing tensions and violence between loyalists and militant separatist groups such as FLNKS during a period known as "the events." Some loyalist activists had also come to see The Rally under its leadership of Jacques Lafleur as too moderate and supported Jean-Marie Le Pen's call for a "French Caledonia." Among the parties founders included former mayor of Thio and Caledonian Union politician Roger Galliot. The party also formed an alliance with another far-right anti-separatist party the Caledonian Front led by Justin Guillemard.

The party saw a peak of popularity during the 1980s. It first contested the 1984 New Caledonian legislative election and won a seat which was taken by Galliot. The party later increased to three representatives during the early 1985 New Caledonian legislative election during which Le Pen visited New Caledonia to organise the party's campaign. During the 1988 territorial elections, it won 8 seats out of 48 and become the second dominant anti-separatist party after The Rally.

The National Front's support declined during the 1990s, as violence between groups died down and the party rejected the Nouméa Accord. The party's support was also concentrated in the South Province which saw it in competition with other new loyalist parties. Although the party predominantly consolidated its support with Caldoche communities, the National Front also began expanding to Wallisians and loyalist Kanaks who had been targeted militants. In 1999, the party lost all of its representatives and subsequently endorsed Harold Martin and his Future Together party until 2009 when it tried to contest the New Caledonia Congress elections but did not see any candidates elected.

In 2021, the party regained representation in the Congress for the first time when representative Guy-Olivier Cuénot was nominated to take over from fellow Future with Confidence member Christopher Gygès who resigned his seat.
