= Caledonian Republicans =

Caledonian Republicans Républicains calédoniens
- Abbreviation: LRC
- President: Sonia Backès
- Honourable President: Isabelle Lafleur
- Vice Presidents: Simon Loueckhote; Valérie Laroque-Daly; Alésio Saliga
- Secretaries General: Grégoire Bernut; Philippe Blaise; Willy Gatuhau
- Founded: 7 December 2017
- Split from: AE, The Rally, RPC
- Headquarters: 5, Rue Lamartine Orphanage, Noumea
- Ideology: Anti-separatism; Economic liberalism Republicanism
- Political position: Centre-right
- National affiliation: La République En Marche! (2022–)
- Regional affiliation: Les Loyalistes
- Seats in the Congress: 7 / 54
- Seats in the South Province: 7 / 40
- Seats in the North Province: 1 / 22

Website
- republicainscaledoniens.nc

The Caledonian Republicans (French: Les Républicains calédoniens; abbreviated LRC) is a liberal-conservative political party in New Caledonia. The party's founding congress was held on 7 December 2017 at Nouvata Hotel in the capital, Nouméa, but its origins can be traced to a political group in Congress that split from The Rally on 18 July 2017.

== History ==
The Caledonian Republicans was formed in the days leading up to the 2017 French legislative election, after disagreements between candidates of The Republicans (represented by The Rally in New Caledonia). Members of the newly founded party criticized other anti-independence parties' economic and labour platforms and rallied under the leadership of trade unionist Sonia Backès.
