= Kanak Socialist Liberation =

Kanak Socialist Liberation Libération kanak socialiste
- Leader: Basile Citré
- Founder: Nidoïsh Naisseline
- Founded: 1981; 45 years ago
- Split from: Party of Kanak Liberation
- Headquarters: Nouméa and Maré
- Ideology: Separatism; Melanesian socialism Democratic socialism
- Political position: Left-wing
- Colours: Yellow
- Seats in the National Assembly: 0 / 2 (0%)
- Seats in the Senate: 0 / 2 (0%)
- Seats in the Congress: 1 / 54 (2%)
- Seats in the South Province: 0 / 40 (0%)
- Seats in the North Province: 0 / 22 (0%)
- Seats in the Loyalty Islands Province: 2 / 14 (14%)

The Kanak Socialist Liberation (French: Libération Kanak Socialiste, LKS) is a Kanak pro-independence and socialist political party in New Caledonia.

== History ==
The LKS was founded by a split in the Party of Kanak Liberation (Palika) in 1981. The most radical members of Palika, which had been the base of the party since its creation, walked out criticizing the Palika's increasing moderation and increasing links with the metropolitan French Socialist Party (PS). Led by Nidoïsh Naisseline, a Marxist, it also refused to support Rock Pidjot of the Caledonian Union in the 1981 elections. However, the LKS gradually became more moderate and did not participate in the FLNKS-led electoral boycotts in the 1980s. In the 1990s, the party even started co-operating with the anti-independence Rally for Caledonia in the Republic (RPCR) in the Loyalty Islands. Thanks to this alliance, Nidoïsh Naisseline was president of the islands between 1995 and 1999. During this time, the LKS adopted a platform in favour of independence-association and started early negotiations with the loyalists while the FLNKS refused talks until a mining dispute in the North had been settled. The alliance with the RPCR ended in 2004, but the LKS has remained close to anti-independence parties, notably Future Together. In fact, Christiane Gambey, a member of Future Together, is also a member of the LKS.

== Platform ==
The LKS supports the Nouméa Accord but wishes to renegotiate certain parts of it, such as replacing the collegial government (which is in practice a perpetual grand coalition between loyalists and nationalists) by a fixed government pulling its support from a fixed majority in Congress.

== Electoral results ==
In the latest legislative elections of 12 May 2019, it won 1.39% of the popular vote, and 1 out of 54 seats in the Congress of New Caledonia. It has two seats in the Loyalty Islands.
