= Gaël Yanno =

French politician

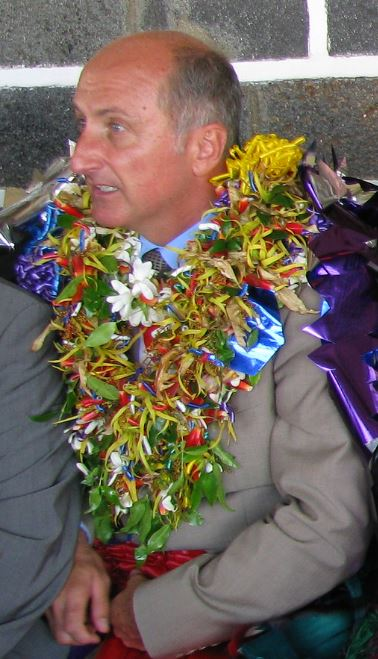
Yanno in 2011

Gaël Yanno (born 2 July 1961 in Nouméa, New Caledonia) is a French politician, and a member of the Union for a Popular Movement. He served as President of the Congress of New Caledonia from 2014 to 2015, and again from July 2018 to May 2019.

He was a member of the National Assembly of France from 2007 to 2012. He represented the island of New Caledonia, with Pierre Frogier. He was a member of the commission of finance, general economy and budgetary control. He was elected in June 2007, but did not get re-elected in 2012.
