= Virginie Ruffenach =

New Caledonian politician

President of the Congress of New Caledonia
- Incumbent
- Assumed office 10 July 2026
- Preceded by: Veylma Falaeo

Member of the Congress of New Caledonia
- Incumbent
- Assumed office 12 May 2019

Personal details
- Born: 19 October 1973 (age 52) Noumea, New Caledonia
- Party: The Rally
- Education: University of Strasbourg

Virginie Ruffenach (born 19 September 1973 in Noumea) is a politician from New Caledonia. She is a member of The Rally and the chairperson of the Future with Confidence alliance in the Congress of New Caledonia.

== Biography ==
Ruffenach was born in Noumea and grew up in town of Dumbéa where her parents worked. She left New Caledonia to study a degree in chemistry at the University of Strasbourg before working as a teacher and a school inspector.

She has been a member of The Rally since 2007 and is a vice-president of the party.
