= Oceanian Awakening =

Oceanian Awakening L'Éveil océanien
- Leader: Milakulo Tukumuli
- Founded: 2019
- Headquarters: Nouméa
- Ideology: Wallisian politics Minority interests Liberalism; Centrism; Multiracialism; Regionalism; Environmentalism
- Political position: Centre
- Colours: Light blue
- Seats in the National Assembly: 0 / 2 (0%)
- Seats in the Senate: 0 / 2 (0%)
- Seats in the Congress: 8 / 54 (15%)
- Seats in the South Province: 4 / 40 (10%)
- Seats in the North Province: 0 / 22 (0%)
- Seats in the Loyalty Islands Province: 0 / 14 (0%)

Oceanian Awakening (French: L'Éveil océanien, EO) is a political party in New Caledonia founded in March 2019.

== History ==
The EO was founded in 2019 to compete in the 2019 New Caledonian legislative election. The aim as a party is to defend the interests of minority Wallisian residents and their descendants in New Caledonia. In the 1950s, a number of young workers from the Wallis and Futuna islands emigrated to New Caledonia in search of better economic opportunities and due to tense political and clan related violence. However, the EO considers the Wallis and Futuna community unrepresented in New Caledonia. Ideologically, the party considers itself to be a centrist, pro-multi-ethnic party that supports non-violence. Party leader Milakulo Tukumuli grew up experiencing violence between Kanak nationalists and anti-separatists during the 1980s which inspired him to create the party. The EO is opposed to separatism for New Caledonia and has taken a neutral stance in the successive independence referendums, with party leader Milakulo Tukumuli stating “We haven’t created a movement to fight for independence or to fight for France – we’ve created a movement to fight poverty in New Caledonia." That's our struggle.” However, the party sits with the pro-separatist bloc in the Congress of New Caledonia in an electoral alliance with the Caledonian Union.
