= National Union for Independence =

National Union for Independence Union nationale pour l'indépendance
- Leader: Louis Mapou
- Founded: 1995
- Ideology: Separatism; Scientific socialism Melanesian socialism Anti-Imperialism; Left-wing nationalism
- Political position: Left-wing
- Colours: Blue, yellow
- Seats in the National Assembly: 0 / 2 (0%)
- Seats in the Senate: 0 / 2 (0%)
- Seats in the Congress: 11 / 54 (20%)
- Seats in the South Province: 3 / 40 (8%)
- Seats in the North Province: 10 / 22 (45%)
- Seats in the Loyalty Islands Province: 4 / 14 (29%)

The National Union for Independence (French: Union nationale pour l'indépendance, UNI) is a militant socialist pro-independence alliance of political parties in New Caledonia. It is a component of the Kanak and Socialist National Liberation Front (FLNKS) along with the Caledonian Union.

From 2021 to 2025, leader Louis Mapou was President of the Government of New Caledonia

== Components ==
The term UNI has now been changed to include a broad coalition of:

- Party of Kanak Liberation (Palika)
- Melanesian Progressive Union (UPM)
- Oceanian Democratic Rally (RDO)
- Renewed Caledonian Union (UC-R) in the Loyalty Islands

The Palika is by far the largest of the four parties.

== History ==
The term UNI was first applied in 1995 to refers to a dissident list from the FLNKS led by Paul Néaoutyine in the North Province. Since then, the term UNI refers to the broad coalition led by the Palika in various provincial elections since then.

In the 2009 provincial elections, the party won 10 seats (of which 8 went to the Palika, the other two to the UC-R and RDO respectively) in the Congress of New Caledonia and around 6.87% of the vote. However, in the South Province, the UNI ran on a common slate with the Caledonian Union and won three of the four seats won by that list (the Palika won one, the UPM won one, and the RDO won one).
