= Party of Kanak Liberation =

New Caledonian pro-independence political party

Party of Kanak Liberation Front de libération nationale kanak et socialiste
- Leader: Paul Néaoutyine
- Founded: 1975
- Headquarters: 2, rue d'Ypres - Centre-ville; 98805 Nouméa
- Ideology: Separatism; Scientific socialism Anti-imperialism; Left-wing nationalism
- National affiliation: None, close to the Socialist Party
- Colours: Red
- Seats in the Congress: 10 / 54
- Seats in the South Province: 3 / 40
- Seats in the North Province: 8 / 22
- Seats in the Loyalty Islands Province: 4 / 14

The Party of Kanak Liberation (French: Parti de libération kanak, Palika) is a socialist pro-independence political party in New Caledonia. It is a component of the National Union for Independence, which in turn is one of the two components of the Kanak and Socialist National Liberation Front (FLNKS).

== History ==
Palika started on the radical left, with Marxist rhetoric, in the 1970s. It participated, like the Caledonian Union (UC), in the Nationalist Front and later the FLNKS as the smaller, but more radical element. After the Matignon Accords, the division between Palika and UC heightened, and in 1995 Paul Néaoutyine led a dissident list (National Union for Independence, UNI) from the FLNKS' united list in the North Province. In 1999, the Palika and UC ran separate lists in all provinces. At the same time, the Palika became more moderate, favouring talks with loyalists but still having as a final goal full independence (as opposed to Free association supported by UC).
