= Congress of New Caledonia =

Unicameral legislature of New Caledonia

Congress of New Caledonia Congrès de la Nouvelle-Calédonie
- 6th

Type
- Type: Unicameral

Leadership
- President: Virginie Ruffenach, LR since 10 July 2026
- President of the Government: Alcide Ponga, The Rally since 16 January 2025

Structure
- Seats: 54 members
- Political groups: Majority (28): Les Loyalistes (18); LR (6); Non-Attached (4)
- Political groups: Minority (26): Kanaky NC (19); UNI (7)

Elections
- Voting system: Party-list proportional representation (D'Hondt method)
- Last election: 28 June 2026

Meeting place
- 1 Boulevard Vauban, Nouméa, New Caledonia

Website
- www.congres.nc

The Congress of New Caledonia (French: Congrès de la Nouvelle-Calédonie), a "territorial congress" (congrès territorial or congrès du territoire), is the legislature of New Caledonia. The congress is headquartered at 1 Boulevard Vauban in downtown Noumea. Local media in New Caledonia refer to the congress as "boulevard Vauban".

== Composition and electoral system ==
The congress has 54 members who serve five-year terms, 32 members from the South Province Assembly, 15 members from the North Province Assembly, and 7 members from Loyalty Islands Province Assembly. Members are elected proportionally based on the partisan makeup of all three assemblies of the provinces of New Caledonia with a 5% threshold.

== Results of parliamentary elections ==
=== 2026 election results ===
The political parties, aside from naturally being split based on socioeconomic ideological differences, are split along hard-line stances on possible New Caledonian independence from France. Both independentists and its opponents subscribe to various socioeconomic ideologies so the difference of opinion is usually rooted in favouring either Kanak nationalism, New Caledonian separatism and independence as opposed to French nationalism and New Caledonian regionalism.

Graph of the party split among 54 seats.
Party	Votes	%	+/–	Seats			
Party	Votes	%	+/–	Provincial assemblies	+/–	Congress	+/–
Les Loyalistes	45,825	38.05		31	+8	24	+7
UC–FLNKS	14,364	11.93		16	+1	10	+1
FLNKS	12,842	10.66		7	0	6	0
National Union for Independence	12,720	10.56		9	–5	6	–3
Oceanian Awakening	8,399	6.97		5	+1	4	0
Us, united!	4,554	3.78	New	0	New	0	New
Faire Pays	4,428	3.68	New	0	New	0	New
Caledonia Together	3,887	3.23		0	–9	0	–7
Nation Autochtone	3,855	3.20		6	+4	3	+2
Palika Îles	2,481	2.06		2	+2	1	+1
Union to build through consensus	2,404	2.00		0	–2	0	–1
A hope for tomorrow	1,520	1.26	New	0	New	0	New
For a French Caledonia	1,158	0.96	New	0	New	0	New
Kanaky sovereignty New Caledonia	1,003	0.83	New	0	New	0	New
France-Caledonia: A homeland	727	0.60		0	0	0	0
Baselaia	137	0.11	New	0	New	0	New
To commit and work for the prosperity of our province and the sovereignty of our country	125	0.10	New	0	New	0	New
Total	120,429	100.00	–	76	0	54	0
Valid votes	120,429	98.18					
Invalid votes	853	0.70					
Blank votes	1,383	1.13					
Total votes	122,665	100.00					
Registered voters/turnout	192,537	63.71					

== See also ==
- List of presidents of the Congress of New Caledonia
