= 2020 New Caledonian independence referendum =

- 4 October 2020
- Do you want New Caledonia to attain full sovereignty and become independent?

Results
Choice	Votes	%
Yes	71,533	46.74%
No	81,503	53.26%
Valid votes	153,036	98.79%
Invalid or blank votes	1,882	1.21%
Total votes	154,918	100.00%
Registered voters/turnout	180,799	85.69%
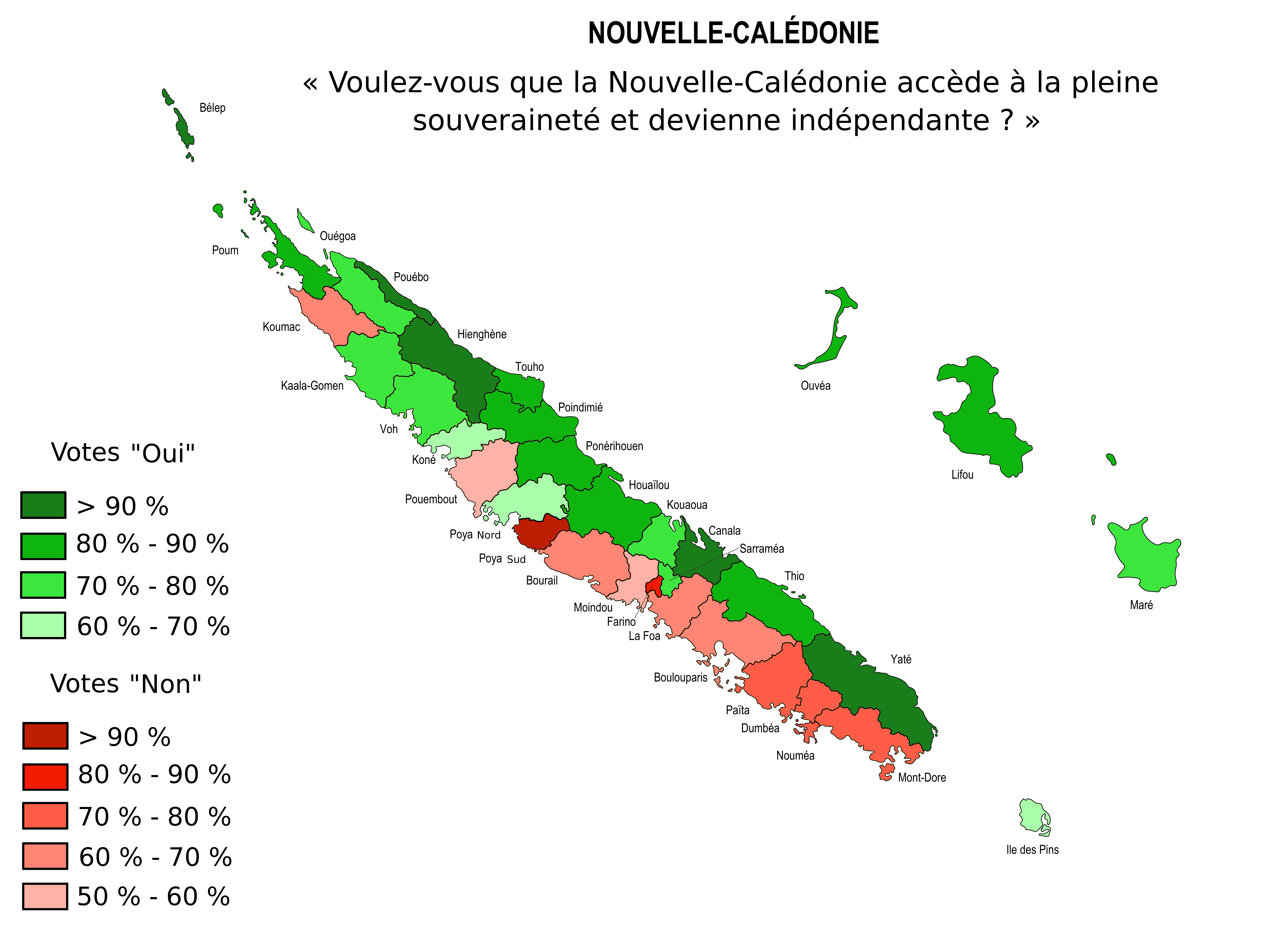
- Results by commune

An independence referendum was held in New Caledonia on 4 October 2020. The poll was the second to be held under the terms of the Nouméa Accord, following a similar referendum in 2018.

Independence was rejected, with 53.26 percent of voters opposing such a change, a slight drop from the 2018 result in which 56.7 percent voted "no". Turnout was 85.69 percent. The Nouméa Accord permitted one further referendum to be held, should the Congress of New Caledonia vote for it. This third referendum was held in December 2021.

== Background ==
New Caledonia was formally annexed by France in 1853. Since then Europeans and Polynesians, as well as other settlers, have made the indigenous Kanaks a minority (27%, 11% and 39% respectively in the 2014 census). The territory was used as a penal colony from 1864 to 1897, and the Kanaks were excluded from the French economy and from mining work, and ultimately confined to reservations. Between 1976 and 1988, conflicts between the French government and the independence movement saw periods of serious violence and disorder (culminating in the Ouvéa cave hostage taking in 1988), with the emerging Kanak independence movement gaining support from many Kanaks frustrated with their lower socio-economic status and lack of involvement in the economy, seen as problems caused by the French exploitation. Though GDP per capita (nominal) is high at $38,921 and though New Caledonia is a major producer of nickel, there is significant inequality in income distribution, with many claiming that the mining revenue benefits people outside the territory and its (declining) mining communities.

Since 1986, the United Nations Committee on Decolonization has included New Caledonia on the United Nations list of non-self-governing territories. The 1987 New Caledonia independence referendum, the first referendum on independence, was held the following year on 13 September 1987, but independence was rejected by a large majority, with 842 people (1.7%) voting for independence and 48,611 people (98.3%) voting to remain a part of France. Many pro-independence groups, such as the Kanak and Socialist National Liberation Front (FLNKS), boycotted the vote.

The Matignon Agreements, signed on 26 June 1988 by Jean-Marie Tjibaou and Jacques Lafleur, set up a ten-year period of stability and made certain provisions for the Kanak population. The Nouméa Accord, signed 5 May 1998 by the French government and the main independence and anti-independence parties, set in motion a 20-year transition period that transferred certain powers to the local government and laid the groundwork for an independence referendum in 2018.

In accordance with the Nouméa Accord, New Caledonians are allowed up to three referendums on independence; the first in 2018, then two more in 2020 and 2022 if the previous ones had not resulted in independence, but one-third of members of the Congress of New Caledonia voted for another one. The first was held in November 2018, with voters rejecting independence by 56.7 percent.

In 2019, members of the Caledonian Union, Future with Confidence, the Kanak and Socialist National Liberation Front (FLNKS) and the National Union for Independence requested another referendum be held.

== Franchise ==
The referendum was held using a special electoral roll. Potential voters had to be registered on the general electoral roll, and also meet one of the secondary criteria:

1. Was on the electoral roll for the 1998 referendum on the Nouméa Accord;
2. Qualified to be on the electoral roll for the 1998 referendum, but were not enrolled;
3. Failed to meet the requirements to be on the 1998 electoral roll solely due to absence related to family, medical or professional reasons;
4. Having civil customary status, or born in New Caledonia and have their material interests in the territory;
5. At least one parent born in New Caledonia and have their material interests in the territory;
6. At least 20 years of continuous residence in New Caledonia by 31 December 2014;
7. Born before 1 January 1989 and have had their residence in New Caledonia between 1988 and 1998
8. Born after 31 December 1988 and reached voting age before the referendum, with at least one parent who was on the electoral roll (or qualified to do so) for the 1998 referendum.

As a consequence of these restrictions, in the 2018 referendum 35,948 registered voters on the general list were thus excluded from the vote, equating to 17.11% out of a total of 210,105 registered voters on the general electoral roll. Vote restriction restricts the voting power of recent inhabitants—also known as Zoreilles—and enlarges the voting power of native Kanaks, and was long sought after by FLNKS. Indigenous leaders accused France of deliberately altering the electorate by seeking to grant voting rights to recently arrived settlers from France.

== Campaign and voting ==
Campaigns were run by the Front de libération nationale kanak et socialiste (FLNKS) and the Mouvement nationaliste pour la souveraineté de Kanaky (Nationalist Movement for the Sovereignty of Kanaky), representing parties who supported independence, and the loyalistes who wanted the territory to remain French. Les Loyalistes included the political parties Future with Confidence and the National Rally, while the secessionists were led by the Labour Party.

Campaign issues included rights to the exploitation of nickel in New Caledonia, The French government and loyalists regarded the nickel as one of its strategic assets, as well as an important source of income and employment for the islanders, while separatists were sceptical of the benefits to them with foreign companies operating the plants, as well as criticising pollution from the industry and its effect on the vital local sectors of agriculture and fisheries.

After abstaining from participating in the 2018 referendum, in July 2020 the anti-globalisation Labour Party announced it would call for its supporters to vote for independence in the upcoming referendum.

The referendum was held on 4 October 2020. Voting on the day was largely held peacefully, although Loyalists alleged that there was intimidation and racist targeting of European Caledonian voters by Kanaks in a few localities.

== Results and aftermath ==
Vote share
Yes	46.74%
No	53.26%

Choice	Votes	%
For	71,533	46.74
Against	81,503	53.26
Total	153,036	100.00
Valid votes	153,036	98.79
Invalid votes	1,027	0.66
Blank votes	855	0.55
Total votes	154,918	100.00
Registered voters/turnout	180,779	85.69
Source: Government of New Caledonia

With a turnout of 85.6 percent, 53.26 percent of voters opted for "no", with the result that the islands remain French. This was a lower figure than the 2018 poll, in which 56.7 percent voted "no". Results were strongly polarised geographically, with 71 percent of South Province residents rejecting independence, while the smaller other two provinces, North Province and Loyalty Islands Province, voted "yes" by 76 percent and 82 percent respectively. In almost every commune, the share of "yes" votes increased.

As this was the second of three permitted independence referendums, it was expected that there may be a third and final referendum at some point before 2022. Daniel Goa, of the pro-independence party Caledonian Union, expressed a hope that the shift in vote share towards the "yes" camp would lead to a successful third referendum. Meanwhile Sonia Backès, leader of Les Loyalistes, called for dialogue between the two sides although she acknowledged that it might be necessary to hold the third referendum before such a dialogue could commence.

French president Emmanuel Macron expressed gratitude for the result, thanking New Caledonians for their "vote of confidence" in the Republic. He also acknowledged those who had backed independence, calling for dialogue between all sides to map out the future of the region.

In April 2021, 26 pro-independence members of Congress requested that a third vote take place. On 2 June, the French government announced that the third referendum was scheduled for 12 December 2021. This third referendum resulted in an overwhelming rejection of independence, with 96.49% of the electorate voting against independence and 3.51% for independence. However, turnout was significantly lower than in past referendums at only 43.90%.

=== By province ===
Results by province
Province	Yes			No			Valid			Blank			Invalid			Turnout			Abstentions			Registered
Province	Votes	%	±	Votes	%	±	Votes	%	±	Votes	%	±	Votes	%	±	Votes	%	±	Votes	%	±	Registered
Loyalty Islands	13,776	84.27%	+2.09%	2,571	15.73%	–2.09%	16,347	99.13%	+0.34%	47	0.29%	–0.07%	97	0.59%	–0.29%	16,491	74.72%	+13.55%	5,580	25.28%	–13.55%	22,071
North Province	28,537	78.34%	+2.51%	7,889	21.66%	–2.51%	36,426	98.98%	+0.40%	129	0.35%	–0.26%	248	0.67%	–0.14%	36,803	89.01%	+3.00%	4,546	10.99%	–3.00%	41,349
South Province	29,220	29.14%	+3.26%	71,043	70.86%	–3.26%	100,263	98.66%	+0.28%	679	0.67%	–0.15%	682	0.67%	–0.13%	101,624	86.58%	+3.57%	15,755	13.42%	–3.57%	117,379
Total	71,533	46.74%	+3.41%	81,503	53.26%	–3.41%	153,036	98.79%	+0.32%	855	0.55%	–0.17%	1,027	0.66%	–0.15%	154,918	85.69%	+4.68%	25,881	14.31%	–4.68%	180,799

=== By commune ===
Support for independence has long been higher in Kanak-majority communes, with this referendum being no exception. In the capital city of Nouméa, a multicultural but predominantly White city where only 23.1% of voters voted for independence, support for independence was significantly higher in the outer northern suburbs than in the more affluent and inner-city suburbs.

Results by province
Commune	Province	Yes		No		Blank	Invalid	Turnout	
Commune	Province	%	±	%	±	Blank	Invalid	%	±
Belep	North	96.45%	+2.00%	3.55%	–2.00%	0.13%	0.13%	81.43%	+4.58%
Boulouparis	South	30.81%	+0.55%	69.19%	–0.55%	0.34%	0.54%	92.59%	+1.85%
Bourail	South	32.72%	+1.81%	67.28%	–1.81%	0.54%	0.86%	90.94%	+2.43%
Canala	North	95.42%	+1.15%	4.58%	–1.15%	0.25%	0.53%	91.13%	+5.74%
Dumbéa	South	26.29%	+4.53%	73.71%	–4.53%	0.67%	0.63%	87.08%	+4.29%
Farino	South	11.46%	+2.28%	88.54%	–2.28%	0.18%	0.91%	94.80%	–0.09%
Hienghène	North	96.26%	+1.51%	3.74%	–1.51%	0.04%	0.58%	91.13%	+4.88%
Houaïlou	North	87.43%	+3.53%	12.57%	–3.53%	0.28%	0.72%	87.17%	+4.78%
Isle of Pines	South	69.85%	+2.53%	30.15%	–2.53%	0.53%	0.47%	85.26%	+2.79%
Kaala-Gomen	North	75.90%	+0.48%	24.10%	–0.48%	0.20%	0.66%	89.51%	+1.99%
Koné	North	66.64%	+2.32%	33.36%	–2.32%	0.53%	0.98%	91.13%	+2.14%
Kouaoua	North	79.46%	+5.92%	20.54%	–5.92%	0.38%	0.48%	89.91%	+5.63%
Koumac	North	38.48%	+2.01%	61.52%	–2.01%	0.41%	0.69%	90.07%	+2.14%
La Foa	South	32.55%	+2.59%	67.45%	–2.59%	0.40%	0.94%	92.44%	+1.05%
Lifou	Loyalty Islands	86.49%	+6.57%	13.51%	–6.57%	0.31%	0.61%	76.47%	+14.18%
Maré	Loyalty Islands	79.29%	–5.29%	20.71%	+5.29%	0.20%	0.61%	71.90%	+18.13%
Moindou	South	46.10%	+1.61%	53.90%	–1.61%	0.95%	1.23%	93.03%	+1.73%
Le Mont-Dore	South	28.16%	+2.60%	71.84%	–2.60%	0.99%	1.03%	86.51%	+2.90%
Nouméa	South	23.31%	+3.82%	76.69%	–3.82%	0.63%	0.58%	84.71%	+4.42%
Ouégoa	North	71.81%	+1.97%	28.19%	–1.97%	0.26%	1.11%	87.03%	+1.05%
Ouvéa	Loyalty Islands	86.18%	+2.00%	13.82%	–2.00%	0.33%	0.51%	74.81%	+15.41%
Païta	South	28.77%	+2.87%	71.23%	–2.87%	0.75%	0.51%	87.57%	+1.95%
Poindimié	North	82.52%	+3.26%	17.48%	–3.26%	0.37%	0.64%	91.00%	+3.08%
Ponérihouen	North	89.18%	+3.56%	10.82%	–3.56%	0.42%	0.59%	88.77%	+3.09%
Pouébo	North	95.12%	+0.87%	4.88%	–0.87%	0.05%	0.64%	84.62%	+3.76%
Pouembout	North	48.17%	+1.64%	51.83%	–1.64%	0.60%	0.53%	89.41%	+1.34%
Poum	North	85.14%	+1.47%	14.86%	–1.47%	0.24%	0.32%	88.54%	+4.21%
Poya-Nord	North	67.30%	+3.14%	32.70%	–3.14%	0.21%	0.56%	89.52%	+2.96%
Poya-Sud	South	2.31%	+0.26%	97.69%	–0.26%	0.00%	0.00%	91.53%	–0.92%
Sarraméa	South	79.03%	+6.13%	20.97%	–6.13%	0.42%	0.63%	93.53%	+0.25%
Thio	South	85.85%	+2.77%	14.15%	–2.77%	0.16%	0.78%	88.15%	+2.77%
Touho	North	85.41%	+2.81%	14.59%	–2.81%	0.36%	0.54%	86.96%	+1.62%
Voh	North	71.58%	+2.98%	28.42%	–2.98%	1.00%	0.95%	89.60%	+2.98%
Yaté	South	90.96%	+2.73%	9.04%	–2.73%	0.12%	0.25%	92.10%	+2.21%

== See also ==
- 2019 Bougainvillean independence referendum
- Decolonisation of Oceania
- Proposed Chuukese independence referendum
