= 2018 New Caledonian independence referendum =

- 4 November 2018
- Do you want New Caledonia to attain full sovereignty and become independent?

Results
Choice	Votes	%
Yes	60,199	43.33%
No	78,734	56.67%
Valid votes	138,933	98.46%
Invalid or blank votes	2,166	1.54%
Total votes	141,099	100.00%
Registered voters/turnout	174,165	81.01%
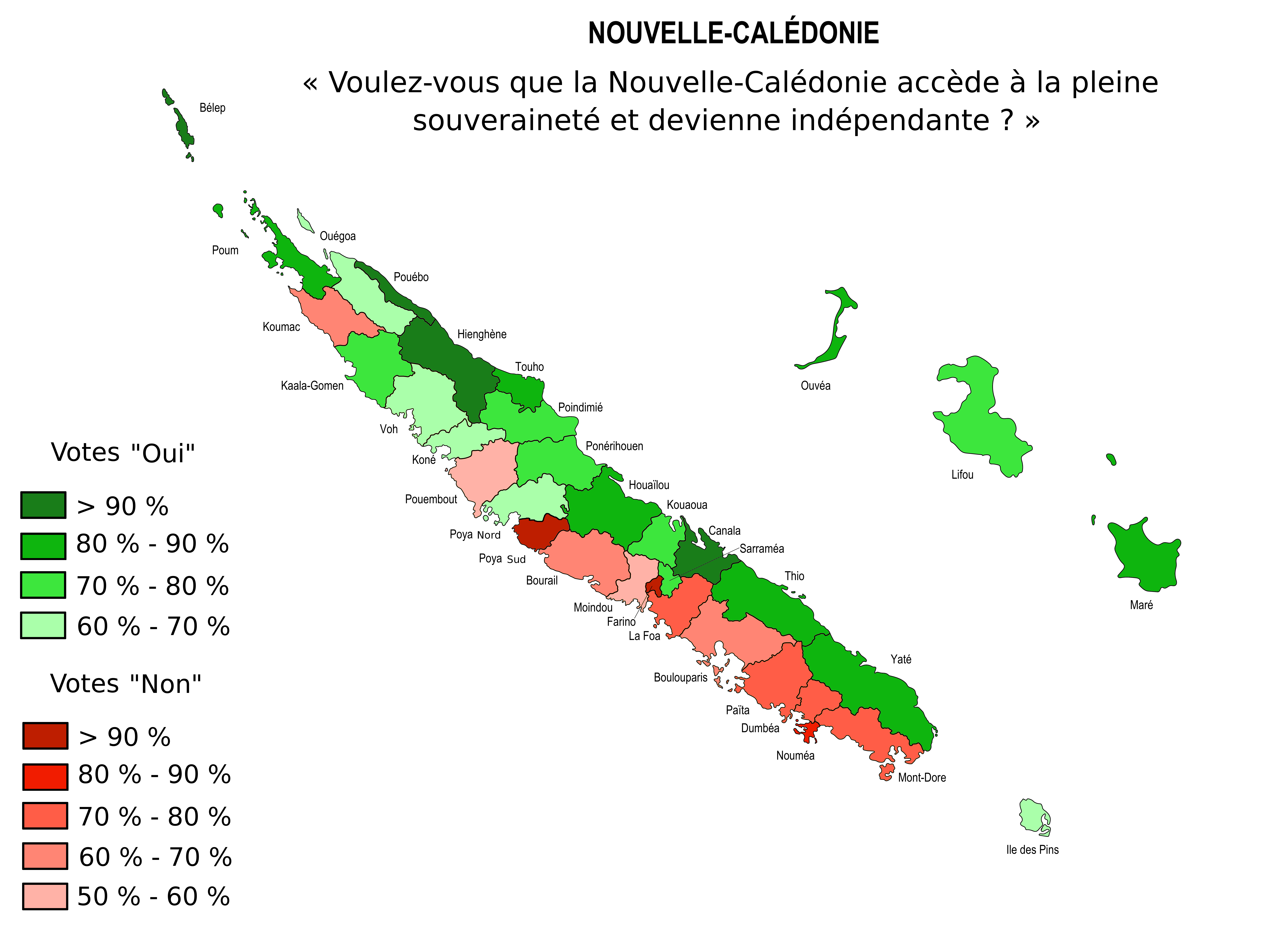
- Results by commune

An independence referendum was held in New Caledonia on 4 November 2018. Voters were given the choice of remaining part of France or becoming an independent country.

Announced in the evening of polling day, the result was 56.4% for maintaining the status quo and 43.6% in favour of independence. The turnout was 81% of the 174,995 voters eligible to vote in this referendum. Recent inhabitants who are registered to vote in general elections were ineligible to vote in the referendum, as agreed in the 1998 Nouméa Accord, representing 17% of the total of 210,105 registered voters of New Caledonia.

Prior to the vote, the government and authorities in Metropolitan France stated that they would recognise and abide by the results of the referendum. Despite the failure of the motion, New Caledonians, under the terms of the Nouméa Accord, had the opportunity to vote again in 2020. Since the 2020 referendum resulted in New Caledonia remaining French, a third, and final, referendum was sanctioned if one third of the Congress of New Caledonia, the local legislature, agreed to allow the vote to be held. Following a request in April 2020 by pro-independence members of Congress, the third referendum was scheduled for 12 December 2021, despite ongoing calls to postpone the referendum citing the severity of the COVID-19 pandemic. The results were overwhelmingly against independence, the FLNKS having boycotted the vote.

== Background ==
New Caledonia was formally annexed by France in 1853, and Europeans and Polynesians, as well as other settlers, have since made the indigenous Kanaks a minority (27%, 11% and 39% respectively in the 2014 census). The territory was used as a penal colony from 1864 to 1897, and the Kanaks were "excluded from the French economy and from mining work, and ultimately confined to reservations". Between 1976 and 1988, conflicts between the French government and the independence movement saw periods of serious violence and disorder (culminating in the Ouvéa cave hostage taking in 1988), with the emerging Kanak independence movement gaining support from many Kanaks frustrated with their lower socio-economic status and lack of involvement in the economy, seen as problems caused by the French "exploitation". Though GDP per capita (nominal) is high at $38,921 and though New Caledonia is a major producer of nickel, there is significant inequality in income distribution, with many claiming that the mining revenue benefits people outside the territory and its (declining) mining communities.

Since 1986, the United Nations Committee on Decolonization has included New Caledonia on the United Nations list of non-self-governing territories. The 1987 New Caledonia independence referendum, the first referendum on independence, was held the following year on 13 September 1987, but independence was rejected by a large majority, with 842 people (1.7%) voting for independence and 48,611 people (98.3%) voting to remain a part of France. Many pro-independence groups, such as the Kanak and Socialist National Liberation Front (FLNKS), boycotted the vote. The participation was 59.10%.

The Matignon Agreements, signed on 26 June 1988 by Jean-Marie Tjibaou and Jacques Lafleur, set up a ten-year period of stability and made certain provisions for the Kanak population. The Nouméa Accord, signed 5 May 1998 by the French government and the main independence and anti-independence parties, set in motion a 20-year transition period that transferred certain powers to the local government and laid the groundwork for an independence referendum in 2018.

The Nouméa Accord stated a vote must take place by the end of 2018. On 2 November 2017, Édouard Philippe, the French Prime Minister, led a meeting to begin work on the referendum of independence, to be held by November 2018. On 20 March 2018, it was announced that the independence referendum would be held on 4 November 2018.

== Vote restriction ==
In New Caledonia, there are three electoral rolls: one general roll for the Congress, French president and French Parliament consisting of all French citizens, one special roll for elections to the provincial assemblies, and one liste électorale spéciale (LESC, a special electoral roll for referendums). To be registered on the LESC, voters had to fulfill at least one of the following conditions:

1. Registration on the special electoral roll for the 1998 New Caledonian Nouméa Accord referendum (or fulfilled its requirements but not registered)
2. Born in New Caledonia and registered in the special electoral list for the provinces (LESP)
3. Residence in New Caledonia for a continuous period of 20 years
4. Born before 1 January 1989 and lived in New Caledonia from 1988 to 1998
5. Born after 1 January 1989 with a parent who was on the special electoral roll for the 1998 Nouméa Accord referendum (or who fulfilled its requirements but was not registered)
6. Born in New Caledonia with three years' continuous residence (prior to 31 August 2018).

A total of 35,948 registered voters on the general list were thus excluded from the vote, equating to 17.11% out of a total of 210,105 registered voters on the general electoral roll.

According to a statement made by the independentist party FLNKS on 18 September 2018, 63% of the 174,154 registered voters on the LESC were Kanak, for a total of 109,892; of these, 80,120 belonged to the droit coutumier (common law) and 29,772 to the droit civil (civil law). Vote restriction restricts the voting power of recent inhabitants— derogatively known as Zoreilles—and enlarges the voting power of native Kanaks, and was long sought after by FLNKS. Indigenous leaders accused France of deliberately altering the electorate by seeking to grant voting rights to recently arrived settlers from France.

== Question ==
The question for the referendum was:

Voulez-vous que la Nouvelle-Calédonie accède à la pleine souveraineté et devienne indépendante ?

English translation: "Do you want New Caledonia to attain full sovereignty and become independent?"

== Opinion polls ==
Polling firm	Fieldwork date	Sample size	For	Against	Undecided/ no opinion	Difference
Harris Interactive	12–22 Sep 2018	1,038	34	66	–	32
Quidnovi	1–15 Aug 2018	731	20	69	11	49
I-Scope	30 Jul–8 Aug 2018	628	28	63	9	35
Quidnovi	4–15 Jun 2018	739	15	65	21	50
Quidnovi	16–26 Apr 2018	712	15	58	27	43
I-Scope	16–25 Apr 2018	682	22.5	59.7	17.8	37.2
I-Scope	23 Mar–4 Apr 2017	514	24.4	54.2	21.4	29.8

== Results ==
Vote share
Yes	43.33%
No	56.67%

Polling stations—a total of 284, distributed across all New Caledonia's communes—were open from 8:00 a.m. to 6:00 p.m. on 4 November. Voters were given pre-printed ballot papers marked OUI (yes) and NON (no) and instructed to indicate their choice by placing one of the two inside an envelope and depositing it in the ballot box.

Provisional results issued that evening by the French government indicated that 56.4% of the votes cast were in favour of maintaining the territory's current status against 43.6% for independence: a tighter margin of victory than polling had forecast and commentators had expected.

The turnout rate of over 80%, surpassing figures reported in both the 2014 election for the territorial Congress and the 2017 French presidential election, was also described as "exceptional".

The regional results were very polarised, with several provinces voting one way or the other by large margins. Four provinces had greater than 90% support for independence; two others had greater than 90% opposition to independence. In the capital, four-fifths of votes were against independence.

Choice	Votes	%
For	60,199	43.33
Against	78,734	56.67
Total	138,933	100.00
Valid votes	138,933	98.46
Invalid/blank votes	2,166	1.54
Total votes	141,099	100.00
Registered voters/turnout	174,165	81.01
Source: Government of New Caledonia

=== By province ===
Support for independence was highest in the North Province and in the Loyalty Islands, which have Kanak majorities (73.8 and 96.6% respectively in 2009) and lower population densities (5.3 and 9.2/km^{2} in 2014, respectively) than South Province (29/km^{2}).

Province	For		Against		Registered voters	Turnout (percent)
Province	Votes	%	Votes	%	Registered voters	Turnout (percent)
South Province	23,821	25.88	68,221	74.12	112,711	83.01
North Province	25,747	75.83	8,208	24.17	40,048	86.01
Loyalty Islands Province	10,631	82.18	2,305	17.82	21,406	61.17

=== By commune ===
Commune	Yes	No	Blank	Invalid	Turnout
Bélep	94.45%	5.55%	0.00%	0.57%	76.85%
Boulouparis	30.26%	69.74%	0.25%	0.75%	90.74%
Bourail	30.91%	69.09%	0.49%	0.95%	88.51%
Canala	94.27%	5.73%	0.60%	1.03%	85.57%
Dumbéa	21.76%	78.24%	0.81%	0.89%	82.79%
Farino	9.18%	90.82%	0.38%	1.15%	94.89%
Hienghène	94.75%	5.25%	0.48%	0.92%	86.57%
Houaïlou	83.90%	16.10%	0.58%	1.02%	82.39%
Île des Pins	67.32%	32.68%	0.78%	0.99%	82.47%
Kaala-Gomen	75.42%	24.58%	0.56%	0.42%	87.52%
Koné	64.32%	35.68%	0.44%	0.96%	87.68%
Kouaoua	73.54%	26.46%	0.84%	0.52%	84.28%
Koumac	36.47%	63.53%	1.09%	0.96%	89.77%
La Foa	29.96%	70.04%	0.61%	0.95%	91.39%
Le Mont-Dore	25.56%	74.44%	0.97%	1.35%	83.61%
Lifou	79.92%	20.08%	0.51%	0.81%	62.29%
Maré	84.58%	15.42%	0.10%	0.93%	53.77%
Moindou	44.49%	55.51%	0.73%	0.73%	91.30%
Nouméa	19.49%	80.51%	0.90%	0.55%	80.29%
Ouégoa	69.84%	30.16%	0.27%	0.38%	84.93%
Ouvéa	84.18%	15.82%	0.31%	0.92%	59.40%
Païta	25.90%	74.10%	0.92%	0.79%	85.62%
Poindimié	79.26%	20.74%	0.67%	0.93%	87.92%
Ponérihouen	85.62%	14.38%	0.93%	0.93%	85.68%
Pouébo	94.25%	5.75%	0.05%	0.53%	80.86%
Pouembout	46.53%	53.47%	0.82%	1.07%	88.07%
Poum	83.67%	16.33%	0.87%	0.78%	84.33%
Poya-Nord	64.16%	35.84%	0.39%	0.72%	86.56%
Poya-Sud	2.05%	97.95%	0.00%	0.68%	92.45%
Sarraméa	72.90%	27.10%	0.85%	0.64%	93.28%
Thio	83.08%	16.92%	0.28%	0.83%	85.38%
Touho	82.60%	17.40%	0.31%	0.56%	85.34%
Voh	68.60%	31.40%	0.89%	1.48%	87.67%
Yaté	88.23%	11.77%	0.06%	0.52%	89.89%
Source: Government of New Caledonia

== Reactions ==
French President Emmanuel Macron, who had visited the island in May 2018, stated that the result showed "confidence in the French Republic".

Aloisio Sako, a leading member of the independentist FLNKS and president of the Pacific Democratic Rally, a political party representing ethnic Wallians and Futunians in New Caledonia, was optimistic about what he saw as a narrow loss for his side, saying "We're a short step away from victory and there are still two votes to come".

In April 2020, 26 pro-independence members of Congress requested that a third vote take place. On 2 June, the French government announced that the third referendum was scheduled for 12 December 2021.

== See also ==
- Decolonisation of Oceania
