= Pierre Maresca =

French politician (1941–2020)

- Born: 30 July 1941; Algiers, French Algeria
- Died: 22 August 2020 (aged 79)
- Occupation: Politician

Pierre Maresca (30 July 1941 – 22 August 2020) was a French politician and journalist in New Caledonia.

== Biography ==
Maresca was born in Algiers to a family of Pied-Noir origin. He moved to New Caledonia in January 1963, a few months after Algeria's independence. He spent ten years as a civil servant before becoming a journalist. He heavily researched New Caledonia's history and published Les Nuits du Bagne calédonien in 1975.

In 1977, Maresca joined the Rally for Caledonia in the Republic (RPCR) party in New Caledonia, a large anti-independence party founded by Jacques Lafleur. He was elected as a municipal councillor in Nouméa within the same list as outgoing mayor Roger Laroque. In 1979, after a new statute granting more powers to the Governmental Council of New Caledonia was passed, he was elected as an executive member of the council led by Dick Ukeiwé. He served as Minister of Health, Public Works, Transportation, Urban Planning and Housing, and the Postal Service at different times. He also led Air Calédonie. However, in June 1982, the Governmental Council's powers fell following a movement by separatists and former allies of the RPCR. The elections of 1984 were boycotted by the Kanak and Socialist National Liberation Front, a separatist party, which led to a huge majority for the RPCR in the Territorial Assembly. Dick Ukeiwé became President of the territory, and appointed Maresca as Minister of Health and Social Affairs. In 1985, a territorial congress replaced the territorial assembly following an agreement between the loyalists and the separatists. Maresca was elected as a councillor to the southern region and became a member of Congress. He was re-elected on 24 April 1988.

Following the Matignon Agreements of 1988, Maresca was elected as Councillor for the South Province, serving until 2009. He also served as a Municipal Councillor in Nouméa from 1977 to 1995, and again from 2001 to 2008.

Pierre Maresca died on 22 August 2020 at the age of 79.
