= Nouméa Accord =

1998 agreement between France and New Caledonia

The Nouméa Accord (French: Accord de Nouméa) of 1998 is a promise by the French Republic to grant increased political power to New Caledonia and its indigenous population, the Kanaks, over a twenty-year transition period. It was signed 5 May 1998 by Lionel Jospin, and approved in a referendum in New Caledonia on 8 November, with 72% voting in favour. Under the accord, three more referendum votes, on whether to remain a special collectivity of France or become an independent state, have been held.

The first referendum was held in 2018, and the second was held in 2020. In both votes, a majority chose to remain French. The Nouméa Accord permitted a final referendum to be held, voted for by the Congress of New Caledonia. It was held December 2021 and widely rejected independence amid a boycott by the independence movement.

Named after New Caledonia's capital and largest city, the Nouméa Accord was the second accord, following the Matignon Agreements (1988). Under the Nouméa Accord, France continues to control the military, foreign policy, immigration, police, and currency.

Under the conditions of the agreement, the Vice President of New Caledonia must be a pro-independence politician if the Presidency is held by an anti-independence politician.

== Signatories ==
The following people signed the Nouméa Accord on 5 May 1998:

- on behalf of the French Republic:
  - Lionel Jospin, Prime Minister, the negotiations having been conducted on his behalf by his interior counselor Alain Christnacht,
  - Jean-Jack Queyranne, secretary of state of Overseas Affairs to the Minister of the Interior, the negotiations having been conducted on his behalf by his chief of staff Thierry Lataste.
- on behalf of the Rally for Caledonia in the Republic (RPCR, anti-independence party) :
  - Jacques Lafleur, president of RPCR, President of the South Province Assembly and representative for the 1st electoral division of New Caledonia,
  - Pierre Frogier, representative for the 2nd electoral division, 1st Vice President of the South Province Assembly and mayor of Mont-Dore,
  - Simon Loueckhote, Senator from New Caledonia and elected from the Assembly of the Loyalty Islands Province and Congress of New Caledonia as well as being municipal councillor for Ouvéa,
  - Harold Martin, President of the Territorial Congress, elected from the South Province Assembly and mayor of Païta,
  - Jean Lèques, mayor of Nouméa, elected from the South Province Assembly and Congress,
  - Bernard Deladrière, Jacques Lafleur's chief of staff.
- on behalf of the Kanak and Socialist National Liberation Front (FLNKS, pro-independence):
  - Rock Wamytan, unitary president of FLNKS, member of the Caledonian Union (UC) part, Grand Chief of the Saint-Louis tribe and of the Pont-des-Français district, elected from the South Province Assembly and Congress,
  - Paul Néaoutyine, chief of the Party of Kanak Liberation (Palika) and the National Union for Independence (UNI) elected from the North Province Assembly and Congress as well as mayor of Poindimié
  - Charles Pidjot, member of the UC, nephew of former deputy Rock Pidjot,
  - Victor Tutugoro, spokesman for the Melanesian Progressive Union (UPM)

== Popular consultation ==
A popular consultation for approval was organized in New Caledonia on Sunday, 8 November 1998.

=== Campaign ===
The local political class was divided on the question of the agreement.

The following political figures and parties called for a "yes" vote:

- Two main signatories: Jacques Lafleur's RPCR (which focuses on "at least 20 years of peace and stability" and a "future in the Republic") and Rock Wamytan's FLNKS (on behalf of the general interest of the country and future generations "),
- Two independentist movements, of moderate tradition, represented in the institutions: the Socialist Kanak Liberation Party (LKS) of Nidoïsh Naisseline ("the future of our country is at stake") and the Federation of Committees Coordinating Independents (FCCI) of Raphaël Mapou, Leopold Jorédié and François Burck ("yes to the long march of the men and women of this country, the yes to our common history so that it does not stop").
- The mayors of Bourail and Dumbéa, respectively Jean-Pierre Aïfa and Bernard Marant, long-time opponents of the RPCR.
- Delin Wema, a former Kanak RPCR executive in the North Province who became one of the leading figures in a new party, Developing Together to Build the Future (DECA),.
- Thierry Valet and Jean-Claude Legras, two members of Congress from Une Nouvelle-Calédonie pour tous (UNCT, an organization created by dissidents from RPCR that subsequently became the principal opposition to Jacques Lafleur within the anti-independence camp) put themselves at odds with the official position of their movement (for them, the "Yes... reconciles at the same time the respect of the others, of their culture, their way of life and the necessary mobilization of all energies to develop the economy of New Caledonia to guarantee social progress and full employment").

The "no" side featured:

- Two main moderate anti-independence parties in opposition to RPCR: Dider Leroux's UNCT, which saw agreement as paving the way for a "banana republic", reinforcing the hegemony of the RPCR over local political life and DECA, led by Koumac Mayor Robert Frouin, who presented the text as a "deceit" and a "Spanish farm where everyone finds what he wants to find" and highlighted the differences of interpretation between the interpretations of the RPCR and the FLNKS.
- Right-wing RPCR members who opposed autonomy. Guy George's local section of the National Front (FN) as Guy George ("I urge you to refuse abandonment and vote no") and Claude Sarran's Movement for France (MPF) (denouncing a "collusion agreement" between "the socialist government to get rid of New Caledonia, the RPCR to extend its political-financial hegemony through transfers of powers and the FLNKS to satisfy its desire for independence"), as well as former RPCR Dick Ukeiwé,
- FLNKS, Louis Kotra Uregi's Union syndicale des travailleurs kanaks et des exploités (USTKE), which wanted immediate independence.

=== Results ===
Results of referendum
1. Yes (71.9%)
2. No (28.1%)

Approuvez-vous l'Accord sur la Nouvelle-Calédonie signé à Nouméa le 5 Mai 1998?

"Do you approve of the New Caledonia Agreement signed in Noumea on 5 May 1998?"

— The referendum question

| Options | Number | % of registered | % of voters | % of cast ballots |
|---|---|---|---|---|
| Yes | 55,400 | 51.92 | 69.95 | 71.86 |
| No | 21,697 | 20.33 | 27.39 | 28.14 |
| Votes cast | 77,097 | 72.26 | 97.34 | 100.00 |
| Blank or spoiled votes | 2,105 | 1.97 | 2.66 | —N/a |
| Total number of voters | 79,202 | 74.23 | 100.00 | — |
| Abstentions | 27,496 | 25.77 | — | — |
| Registered | 106,698 | 100.00 | — | — |

Source : Décision du 9 novembre 1998 proclamant les résultats de la consultation des populations de la Nouvelle-Calédonie du dimanche 8 novembre 1998

== See also ==
- Ouvéa cave hostage taking
- Bougival Accord
