= Ilaïsaane Lauouvéa =

Wallisian politician (born 1970)

Member of the Congress of New Caledonia

Personal details
- Born: 1970 (age 55–56) Nouméa
- Party: Kanak and Socialist National Liberation Front

Ilaïsaane Lauouvéa (born 1970) is a New Caledonian politician, who from 2009 to 2014 was an elected member of the Congress of New Caledonia representing the Kanak and Socialist National Liberation Front.

== Education ==
Lauouvéa was born in 1970 in Nouméa. Her family originally came from Wallis, part of the French collectivity of Wallis and Futuna. She studied law at the French Pacific University at its New Caledonia centre. She then was awarded an MA in Political Science from Paris X University. In 2017 she graduated with a second MA in Public Policy the Australian National University.

== Career ==
From 2001 to 2007 she was elected to the municipal council of Mont-Dore. In 2009 she represented New Caledonia at the United Nations General Assembly, arguing for self-determination for the collectivity, as well as citing wealth inequality as the most important social issue.

From 2009 to 2014 she was elected to the Assembly of the South Province and to the Congress of New Caledonia. From 2013 to 2014 she was a President of the Standing Committee of Congress. She is a member of the Kanak and Socialist National Liberation Front. In 2017 she was a member of Maison de la Mélanésie and on the board of directors on the Institute of the Pacific at the Australian National University. In 2021 she worked as a senior advisor in the New Caledonia government's Regional Cooperation and External Relations Department.
