= 1988 French Matignon Accords referendum =

6 November 1988
- Do you agree to allow New Caledonian residents to vote for self-determination in 1998?

Results
Choice	Votes	%
Yes	9,896,498	80.00%
No	2,474,548	20.00%
Valid votes	12,371,046	88.18%
Invalid or blank votes	1,657,659	11.82%
Total votes	14,028,705	100.00%
Registered voters/turnout	38,025,823	36.89%

A referendum on the Matignon Accords on New Caledonia was held in France on 6 November 1988. The accords were approved by 80% of voters, although turnout was just 36.9%. In New Caledonia it was approved by 57% of voters.

The text of the referendum was the following:

"Acceptez-vous de permettre aux habitants de la Nouvelle-Calédonie de voter pour l'autodétermination en 1998?"

"Do you agree to allow New Caledonian residents to vote for self-determination in 1998?"

== Results ==
Choice	Metropolitan France		New Caledonia		Total	
Choice	Votes	%	Votes	%	Votes	%
For	9,714,689	80.0	29,286	57.0	9,896,498	80.0
Against	2,428,089	20.0	22,066	43.0	2,474,548	20.0
Invalid/blank votes	1,638,803	–	4,584	–	1,657,659	–
Total	13,781,581	100	55,936	100	14,028,705	100
Registered voters/turnout	36,897,052	37.4	88,262	63.37	38,025,823	36.9
Source: Nohlen & Stöver, Constitutional Council, Direct Democracy
