= 1998 New Caledonian Nouméa Accord referendum =

8 November 1998
- Do you approve the Accord on New Caledonia signed in Nouméa on 5 May 1998?

Results
Choice	Votes	%
Yes	55,400	71.86%
No	21,697	28.14%
Valid votes	77,097	97.34%
Invalid or blank votes	2,105	2.66%
Total votes	79,202	100.00%
Registered voters/turnout	106,698	74.23%
- Results by town

A referendum on the Nouméa Accord was held in New Caledonia on 8 November 1998. It was approved by 71.85% of voters. The proportion of voters in favour was highest in the Loyalty Islands (where turnout was lowest) and lowest in the South Province (where turnout was highest).

== Background ==
After the rejection of independence in the 1987 referendum and the subsequent Ouvéa cave hostage taking in April and May 1988, the Matignon Agreements signed in June 1988 (and approved in a France-wide referendum) provided for another referendum in the territory in 1998. The Nouméa Accord was subsequently agreed on 5 May 1998, and provided for a gradual transfer of powers to the New Caledonian authorities.

== Results ==
Do you approve the Accord on New Caledonia signed in Nouméa on 5 May 1998?

Choice	Votes	%
For	55,400	71.85
Against	21,697	28.15
Invalid/blank votes	2,105	–
Total	79,202	100
Registered voters/turnout	106,698	74.23
Source: Direct Democracy
