= 1987 New Caledonian independence referendum =

- 13 September 1987
- Do you want New Caledonia to gain independence or remain within the French Republic?

Results
Choice	Votes	%
Remain with France	48,611	98.30%
Independence	842	1.70%
Valid votes	49,453	98.41%
Invalid or blank votes	797	1.59%
Total votes	50,250	100.00%
Registered voters/turnout	85,022	59.1%

An independence referendum was held in New Caledonia on 13 September 1987. Voters were given the choice of remaining part of France or becoming independent. The referendum was boycotted by independence movements. Only 1.7% voted in favour of independence.

== Background ==
In 1983, the French Socialist government recognised Kanak rights to self-determination and agreed to hold a referendum on independence from France. By a vote of 325 to 249, the French Parliament passed a law on 15 April 1984 on holding an independence referendum in New Caledonia. There was controversy over voter eligibility as it could not be made a Kanak-only vote, as requested by the local independence movements, as that would violate the French Constitution's equality articles and the New Caledonian Front Indépendantiste's request eligibility be limited to only those with one parent born in the territory was also rejected. Under President Jacques Chirac, it was eventually decided that all French citizens who had lived on the territory for three years, would be eligible to vote.

Independence movements including the Kanak and Socialist National Liberation Front boycotted the referendum in protest at the franchise requirements, which made the indigenous population a minority. Although former French president François Mitterrand had promised short-term residents of the territory would not be able to vote, they were enfranchised for the referendum. As a result of claimed failures to respect the rights of the indigenous population, the United Nations Special Committee on Decolonization did not send observers.

== Results ==
Voters were asked "Do you wish New Caledonia to remain in the French Republic, or do you wish it to become independent?"

Choice	Votes	%
France	48,611	98.30
Independence	842	1.70
Invalid/blank votes	797	–
Total	50,250	100
Registered voters/turnout	85,022	59.10
Source: Direct Democracy

== See also ==
- 2018 New Caledonian independence referendum
- 2020 New Caledonian independence referendum
- 2021 New Caledonian independence referendum
- Decolonisation of Oceania
- United Nations list of non-self-governing territories
- Ouvéa cave hostage taking (1988)
- "Yaka dansé"
