= Zoreilles =

Réunion residents born in Metropolitan France

Zoreille is a Réunion Creole term to describe French people who were born in Metropolitan France and reside on the island of Réunion. It contrasts with the terms Petits Blancs (fr) ("Little Whites") and Gros Blancs (fr) ("Big Whites"), which refer to the descendants of earlier European settlers. It is one of the ethnic groups of Réunion, but the term is also used in New Caledonia, French Polynesia, the Lesser Antilles, and Mauritius.

== Etymology ==
Zoreilles (z'oreilles, zorey) means ears in Réunion Creole, owing to a reanalysis, in a manner common to many French nouns beginning with vowels absorbed into Réunion Creole, of the liaison between the French plural article les and the noun oreilles in les oreilles (IPA: [lez‿ɔʁɛj]), 'the ears'. It has been suggested that a warning spread by the French government in 1915, during World War I, "Taisez-vous! Méfiez-vous! Les oreilles ennemies vous écoutent" ("Be quiet! Be careful! Enemy ears are listening to you"), played a role in the adoption of the term to refer to Metropolitan French, but does not necessarily lie at its origin. Some scholars suggest that the red ears of the European soldiers drew the attention of the locals, while others propose an origin that claims European colonists, having trouble understanding Creole, cupped an ear and asked speakers to repeat themselves.

== See also ==
- Béké
- Caldoche
