= Matignon Agreements (1988) =

1988 provisions for the devolution of New Caledonian governance

The Matignon Agreements were agreements signed in the Hôtel Matignon by Jean-Marie Tjibaou and Jacques Lafleur on 26 June 1988 between loyalists who wanted to keep New Caledonia as a part of the French Republic, and separatists, who wanted independence. The agreements were arranged under the aegis of the Government of France as a result of discussions and compromises arranged by Christian Blanc, the negotiator for Michel Rocard's government.

== Description ==
The accords set up a ten-year period of development. Institutional and economical provisions were made for the Kanak community. The New Caledonians agreed not to raise the independence issue during this period.

The agreements provided amnesty for those involved in the Ouvéa cave hostage taking incident of 1988 and prohibited all proceedings in regard to the deaths of four gendarmes and 19 members of the independentist Kanaks.

The Matignon Agreements were approved by French and New Caledonian voters in a referendum held on 6 November 1988 in which voters were asked, "Do you agree to allow New Caledonian residents to vote for self-determination in 1998?". A majority voters – 80% – voted for New Caledonian residents to determine whether or not to institute self-determination. The voter participation in the referendum was 37%, with 12% of the ballots blank or void.

A year after signing the accords FLNKS leaders Jean-Marie Tjibaou and Yeiwéné Yeiwéné were assassinated by FLNKS militants who opposed to peace deal.

On 5 May 1998, the Nouméa Accord was signed under the aegis of Lionel Jospin. It scheduled a twenty-year transition until a planned vote on the transfer of sovereignty in 2018. The territory would be fully autonomous, except for the fields of the military, security, the judiciary and finance, which would remain competencies of France. The accord was approved by 72% of voters in referendum in New Caledonia that was held on 8 November.
