= New Caledonia =

French territory in the southwest Pacific Ocean

New Caledonia Nouvelle-Calédonie (French)
- Sui generis collectivity
- Flags Emblem
- Motto: "Liberté, Égalité, Fraternité" (French) (English: "Liberty, Equality, Fraternity") Territorial motto: "Terre de parole, terre de partage" (French) (English: "Land of speech, land of sharing")
- Anthem: "La Marseillaise"
- Regional anthem: Soyons unis, devenons frères (English: "Let us unite, let us become brothers")
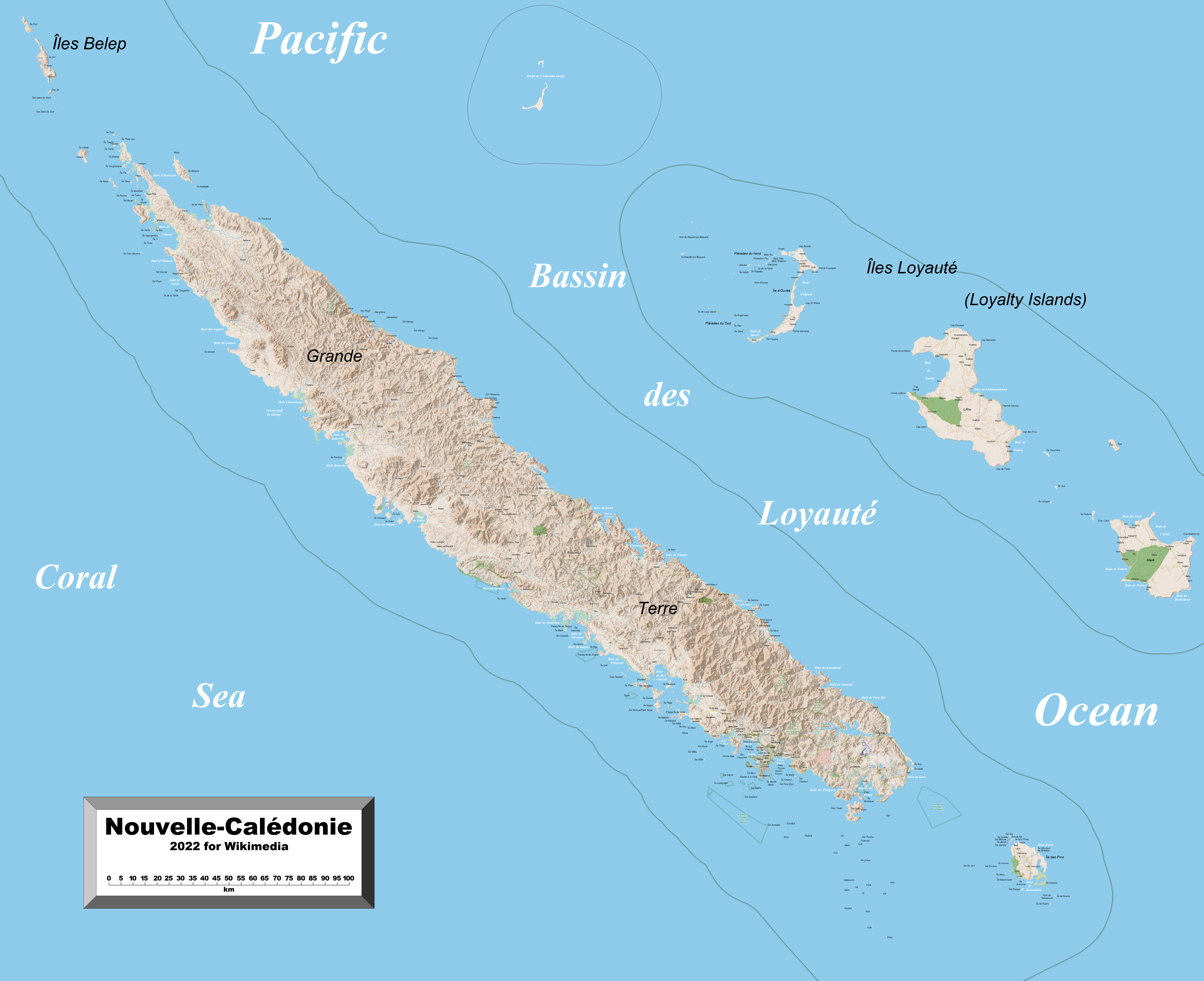
- Location of New Caledonia
- Sovereign state: France
- Annexed by France: 24 September 1853
- Overseas territory: 1946
- Nouméa Accord: 5 May 1998
- Capital and largest city: Nouméa; 22°16′S 166°28′E
- Official languages: French
- Recognised regional languages: Drehu; Nengone; Paicî; Ajië; 35 other native languages
- Foreign languages: English (Note: English is widely used in industries such as tourism due to New Caledonia's close proximity to Australia and New Zealand.)
- Ethnic groups (2019): Kanak (41.2%); European (24.1%); Mixed (11.3%); Polynesian (10.3%); Other (13.1%)
- Demonym(s): New Caledonian; French
- Government: Devolved parliamentary dependency
  - President: Emmanuel Macron
  - High Commissioner: Jacques Billant
  - President of the Government: Milakulo Tukumuli
  - President of the Congress: Virginie Ruffenach
- Legislature: Congress

French Parliament
  - Senate: 2 senators (of 348)
  - National Assembly: 2 seats (of 577)

Area
  - Total: 18,575 km^{2} (7,172 sq mi)
  - Land: 18,275 km^{2} (7,056 sq mi)
  - Water (%): 1.6
- Highest elevation (Mont Panie): 1,628 m (5,341 ft)

Population
  - April 2025 census: 264,596 (184th)
  - Density: 14.5/km^{2} (37.6/sq mi) (200th)
- GDP (nominal): 2019 estimate
  - Total: US$9.48 billion
  - Per capita: US$34,939
- Currency: CFP franc (₣) (XPF)
- Time zone: UTC+11:00
- Driving side: Right
- Calling code: +687
- ISO 3166 code: NC; FR-NC; NCL
- Internet TLD: .nc

New Caledonia (Note: (/ˌkælɪˈdoʊniə/ KAL-ih-DOH-nee-ə; French: Nouvelle-Calédonie [nuvɛl kaledɔni]) (Note: Previously known officially as the "Territory of New Caledonia and Dependencies" (Territoire de la Nouvelle-Calédonie et dépendances), then simply as the "Territory of New Caledonia" (Territoire de la Nouvelle-Calédonie), the official French name is now only Nouvelle-Calédonie (Organic Law of 19 March 1999, article 222 IV). The French courts often continue to use the appellation Territoire de la Nouvelle-Calédonie.)) is a French territory consisting of a group of islands in the southwest Pacific Ocean, 220 km (140 mi) southwest of Vanuatu and 1,210 km (750 mi) east of Australia. Located 16,100 km (10,000 mi) from Metropolitan France, it forms a sui generis collectivity of the French Republic, having a unique legal status enshrined in a dedicated chapter of the French Constitution.

The archipelago, part of the Melanesia subregion, includes the main island of Grande Terre, the Loyalty Islands, the Chesterfield Islands, the Belep archipelago, the Isle of Pines, and a few remote islets. The Chesterfield Islands are in the Coral Sea. French people, especially locals, call Grande Terre le Caillou, (Note: pron. [lə kaju], lit. 'the stone') a nickname also used more generally for New Caledonia itself. Pro-independence Kanak parties use the name (la) Kanaky (Note: The definite article la is often omitted by pro-independence parties and militants, as in l'indépendance de Kanaky ('the independence of Kanaky') or le futur de Kanaky ('the future of Kanaky') for example, where French grammar would normally require a definite article.) to refer to New Caledonia, a term coined in the 1980s from the ethnic name of the indigenous Melanesian Kanak people, who make up 41% of New Caledonia's population. New Caledonia is associated with the European Union as an overseas country and territory (OCT).

New Caledonia has a land area of 18,575 km^{2} (7,172 sq mi) divided into three provinces. The North and South Provinces are on the New Caledonian mainland, while the Loyalty Islands Province is a series of four inhabited islands off the east coast of mainland (from north to south: Ouvéa, Lifou, Tiga, and Maré). New Caledonia's population of 264,596 (April 2025 census) is of diverse origins and varies by geography; in the North and Loyalty Islands Provinces, the indigenous Kanaks predominate, while the wealthy South Province contains significant populations of European (Caldoches and Metropolitan French), Kanak, and Polynesian (mostly Wallisian) origin, as well as smaller groups of Southeast Asian, Pied-Noir, and North African heritage. The capital of New Caledonia is Nouméa.

== History ==
New Caledonia was part of the continent Zealandia, which broke off from the supercontinent Gondwana and sank between 79 million and 83 million years ago. The earliest traces of human presence in New Caledonia date back to the period when the Lapita culture was influential in large parts of the Pacific, c. 1600–500 BC or 1300–200 BC. The Lapita were highly skilled navigators and agriculturists. The first settlements were concentrated around the coast and date back to the period between c. 1100 BC and AD 200.

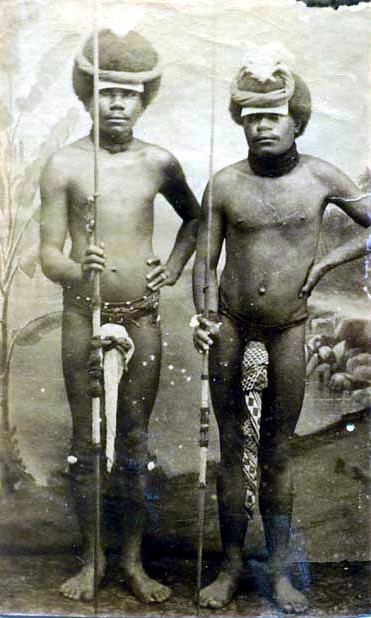
Two Kanak warriors posing with penis gourds and spears, around 1880

British explorer James Cook was one of the first Europeans to sight New Caledonia, on 4 September 1774, during his second voyage.The northeast of the island reminded him of Scotland, so he named it New Caledonia, after the Latin name of that country. The west coast of Grande Terre was approached by the Comte de Lapérouse in 1788, shortly before his disappearance, and the Loyalty Islands were first visited between 1793 and 1796 when Mare, Lifou, Tiga, and Ouvea were mapped by English whaler William Raven. Raven encountered the island then named Britania, and today known as Maré (Loyalty Is.), in November 1793. From 1796 until 1840, only a few sporadic contacts with the archipelago were recorded. About 50 American whalers left record of being in the region (Grande Terre, Loyalty Is., Walpole and Hunter) between 1793 and 1887. Contacts with visiting ships became more frequent after 1840, because of their interest in sandalwood.

As trade in sandalwood declined, it was replaced by a new business enterprise, "blackbirding", a euphemism for taking Melanesian or Western Pacific Islanders from New Caledonia, the Loyalty Islands, New Hebrides, New Guinea, and the Solomon Islands into slavery, indentured or forced labour in the sugarcane plantations in Fiji and Queensland by various methods of trickery and deception. Blackbirding was practised by both French and Australian traders, but in New Caledonia's case, the trade in the early decades of the twentieth century involved kidnapping children from the Loyalty Island to the Grand Terre for forced labour in plantation agriculture. New Caledonia's primary experience with blackbirding revolved around a trade from the New Hebrides (now Vanuatu) to the Grand Terre for labour in plantation agriculture, mines, as well as guards over convicts and in some public works. In the early years of the trade, coercion was used to lure Melanesian islanders onto ships. In later years indenture systems were developed; however, when it came to the French slave trade, which took place between its Melanesian colonies of the New Hebrides and New Caledonia, very few regulations were implemented. This represented a departure from contemporary developments in Australia, since increased regulations were developed to mitigate the abuses of blackbirding and 'recruitment' strategies on the coastlines.

The first missionaries from the London Missionary Society and the Marist Brothers arrived in the 1840s. In 1849, the crew of the American ship Cutter was killed and eaten by the Pouma clan. Human cannibalism was widespread throughout New Caledonia.

=== French colonisation ===
On 24 September 1853, under orders from Emperor Napoleon III, Admiral Febvrier Despointes took formal possession of New Caledonia. Captain Louis-Marie-François Tardy de Montravel founded Port-de-France (Nouméa) on 25 June 1854. A few dozen free settlers settled on the west coast in the following years. New Caledonia became a penal colony in 1864, and from the 1860s until the end of the transportations in 1897, France sent about 22,000 criminals and political prisoners to New Caledonia. The Bulletin de la Société générale des prisons for 1888 indicates that 10,428 convicts, including 2,329 freed ones, were on the island as of 1 May 1888, by far the largest number of convicts detained in French overseas penitentiaries. (Note: As compared to 4,053 convicts, including 1,176 freed ones, in French Guiana at the same date.) The convicts included many Communards, arrested after the failed Paris Commune of 1871, including Henri de Rochefort and Louise Michel. Between 1873 and 1876, 4,200 political prisoners were "relegated" to New Caledonia. Only 40 of them settled in the colony; the rest returned to France after being granted amnesty in 1879 and 1880.

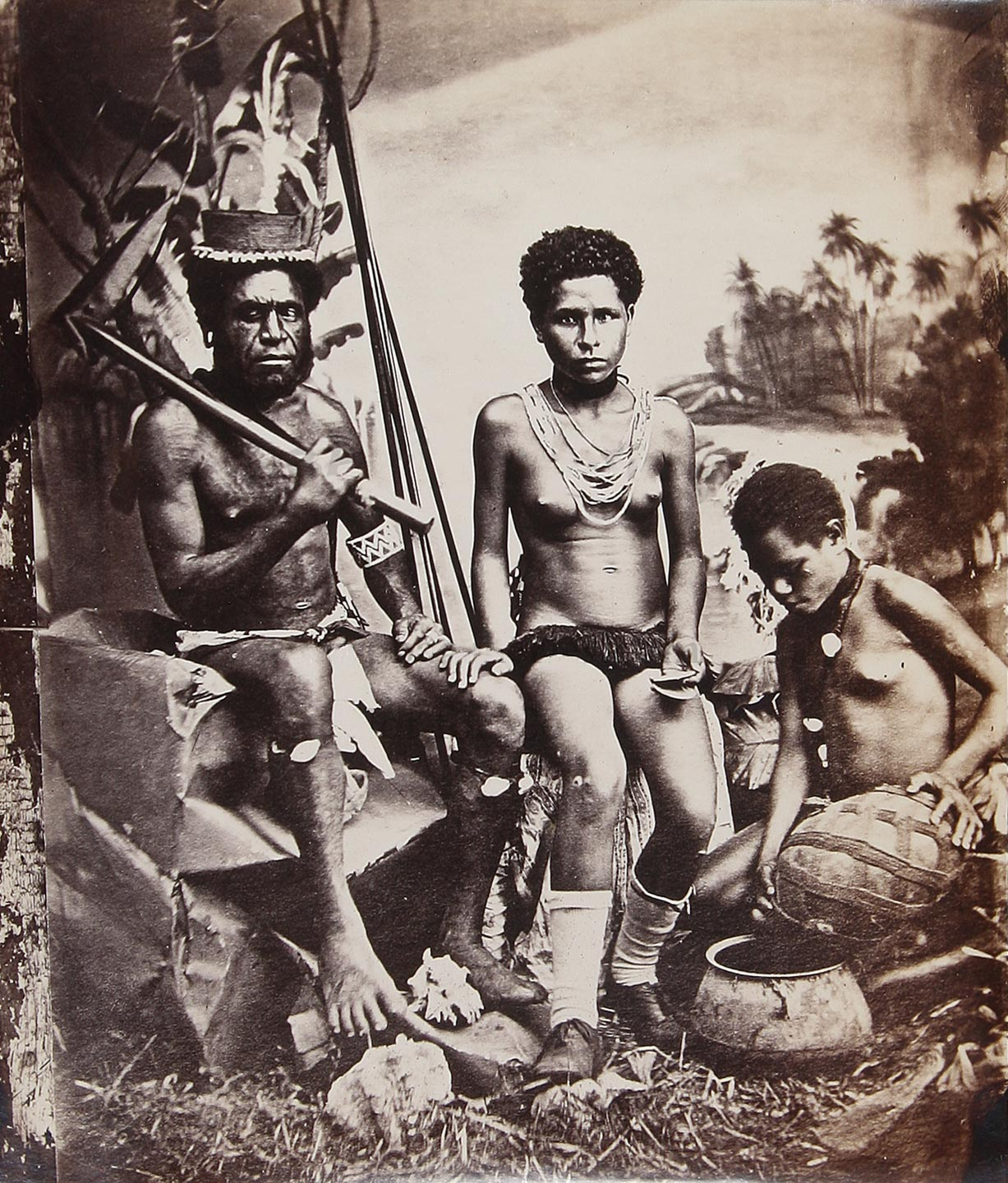
Chief King Jacques and his Queen, from The Romance of the South Seas, Clement Lindley Wragge, Chatto & Windus, 1906

In 1864, nickel was discovered on the banks of the Diahot River; with the establishment of the Société Le Nickel in 1876, mining began in earnest. To work the mines the French imported labourers from neighbouring islands and from the New Hebrides, and later from Japan, the Dutch East Indies, and French Indochina. The French government also attempted to encourage European immigration, without much success.

The indigenous Kanak people were excluded from the French economy and from mining work, and ultimately confined to reservations. This sparked a violent reaction in 1878, when High Chief Ataï of La Foa managed to unite many of the central tribes and launched a guerrilla war that killed 200 Frenchmen and 1,000 Kanaks. A second uprising occurred in 1917, with Protestant missionaries like Maurice Leenhardt functioning as witnesses to the events of this war. Leenhardt would pen a number of ethnographic works on the Kanak of New Caledonia. Noël of Tiamou led the 1917 rebellion, which resulted in a number of orphaned children, one of whom was taken into the care of Protestant missionary Alphonse Rouel. This child, Wenceslas Thi, would become the father of Jean-Marie Tjibaou (1936–1989).

Europeans brought new diseases such as smallpox and measles, which caused the deaths of many natives. The Kanak population declined from around 60,000 in 1878 to 27,100 in 1921, and their numbers did not increase again until the 1930s.

=== World War II ===
In June 1940, after the fall of France, the General Council of New Caledonia voted to reject the Vichy government and continue supporting the Allied military effort against Germany. However, the colonial governor Georges-Marc Pélicier promulgated the Vichy government's Constitutional Law, which sparked street demonstrations and an assassination attempt. By this time the Caldoches had been in contact with Charles de Gaulle who encouraged them to form a Free French committee and appointed Henri Sautot as governor. The Vichy government dispatched the warship Dumont d'Urville at Pélicier's request, but soon deemed him incompetent and appointed an acting governor. By this time the Australian government had agreed to intervene and dispatched HMAS Adelaide to oversee the installation of Sautot as governor. A stand-off between Dumont d'Urville and Adelaide followed, with Pélicier and other pro-Vichy officials ultimately deported to French Indochina.

In 1941, some 300 men from the territory volunteered for service overseas. They were joined, in April, by 300 men from French Polynesia ('the Tahitians'), plus a handful from the French districts of the New Hebrides: together they formed the Bataillon du Pacifique. The Caledonians formed two of the companies, and the Polynesians the other two. In May 1941, they sailed to Australia and boarded the RMS Queen Elizabeth for the onward voyage to Africa. They joined the other Free French (FF) battalions in Qastina in August, before moving to the Western Desert with the 1st FF Brigade (1^{re} BFL). There they were one of the four battalions who took part in the breakout after the Battle of Bir Hakeim in 1942. Their losses could not easily be replaced from the Pacific and they were therefore amalgamated with the Frenchmen of another battalion wearing the anchor of la Coloniale, the BIM, to form the Bataillon de l'infanterie de marine et du Pacifique. The combined battalion formed part of the Gaulliste 1^{re} Division Motorisée d'Infanterie/Division de Marche d'Infanterie, alongside three divisions from the French North African forces, in the French Expeditionary Corps during the Italian Campaign. They landed in Provence in 1944, when they were posted out and replaced by local French volunteers and résistants.

Meanwhile, in March 1942, with the assistance of Australia, New Caledonia became an important Allied base, and the main South Pacific Fleet base of the United States Navy in the South Pacific moved to Nouméa in 1942–1943. The fleet that turned back the Japanese Navy in the Battle of the Coral Sea in May 1942 was based at Nouméa. American troops stationed on New Caledonia numbered as many as 50,000, matching the entire local population at the time.

=== Post-war period ===
In 1946, New Caledonia became an overseas territory. By 1953, French citizenship had been granted to all New Caledonians, regardless of ethnicity.

During the late 1940s and early 1950s, New Caledonia strengthened its economic links with Australia, particularly as turmoil within France and its empire weakened New Caledonia's traditional economic links to metropolitan France; New Caledonia supplied nickel to Australia in exchange for coal vital for smelting nickel. New Caledonian exports of iron ore and timber to Australia also increased during this time period.

The European and Polynesian populations gradually increased in the years leading to the nickel boom of 1969–1972, and the indigenous Kanak Melanesians became a minority, though they were still the largest ethnic group.

=== Independence movement and modern era ===
==== The Events ====
Between 1976 and 1988, a period referred to as "the Events" (French: Les Événements), conflicts between French government actions and the Kanak independence movement saw periods of serious violence and disorder. In 1983, a statute of "enlarged autonomy" for the territory proposed a five-year transition period and a referendum in 1989. In March 1984, the Front Indépendantiste, a Kanak resistance group, seized farms and the Kanak and Socialist National Liberation Front (FLNKS) formed a provisional government. In January 1985, the French Left-wing government offered sovereignty to the Kanaks and legal protection for European settlers. The plan faltered as violence escalated. The government declared a state of emergency; however, regional elections went ahead, and the FLNKS won control of three out of four provinces. The centre-right government elected in France in March 1986 began eroding the arrangements established under the Socialists, redistributing lands mostly without consideration of native land claims, resulting in over two-thirds going to Europeans and less than a third to the Kanaks. By the end of 1987, roadblocks, gun battles and the destruction of property culminated in the Ouvéa cave hostage taking, a dramatic hostage crisis just days before the 1988 French presidential election began. Pro-independence militants on Ouvéa killed four gendarmes and took 27 hostage. The military assaulted the cave to rescue the hostages. Nineteen Kanak hostage takers were killed and another three died in custody, while two soldiers were killed during the assault.

==== Nouméa Accord and independence referendums ====
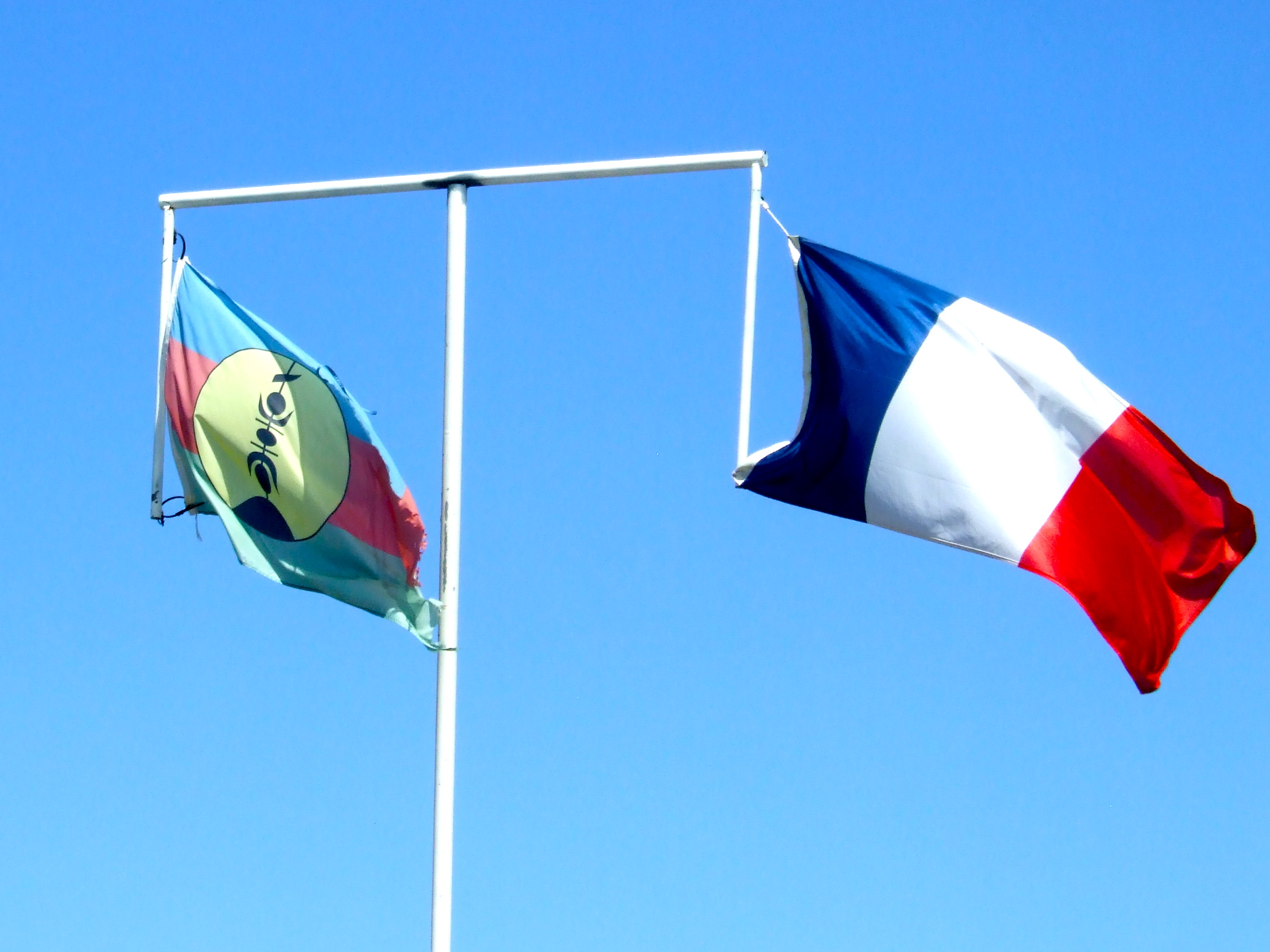
Flags side by side on the same pole, Nouméa, March 2011

The Matignon Agreements, signed on 26 June 1988, ensured a decade of stability. The Nouméa Accord, signed 5 May 1998, set the groundwork for a 20-year transition that gradually transfers competences to the local government.

Following the timeline set by the Nouméa Accord that stated a vote must take place by the end of 2018, the groundwork was laid for a referendum on full independence from France at a meeting chaired by the French Prime Minister Édouard Philippe on 2 November 2017, to be held by November 2018. Voter list eligibility was the subject of a long dispute, but the details were resolved in an electoral list that granted automatic eligibility to voters of Kanak origin but excluded those of other origins who had not been longtime residents of the territory. The referendum was held on 4 November 2018, with independence being rejected.

Another referendum was held in October 2020, with voters once again choosing to remain a part of France. In the 2018 referendum, 56.7% of voters chose to remain in France. In the 2020 referendum, this percentage dropped with 53.4% of voters choosing to remain part of France.

The third referendum was held on 12 December 2021. The referendum was boycotted by pro-independence forces, who argued for a delayed vote due to the impact caused by the COVID-19 pandemic; when the French government declined to do so, they called for a boycott. This led to 96% of voters choosing to stay with France.

In May 2024, riots broke out amid debate over a proposed electoral reform in the territory. In October 2024, then-French Prime Minister Michel Barnier scrapped the bill, citing the need to restore calm and telling the National Assembly that "avoiding further unrest" was a priority. On 2 December 2024, curfew was officially lifted as the riots were over. As of early 2026, the National Gendarmerie maintained a significant presence in New Caledonia, with five squadrons kept on standby in the case of further unrest.

In July 2025, a deal was struck between the French Government and New Caledonia, to establish a new “État de Nouvelle-Calédonie”, the “State of New Caledonia”, with the status to be enshrined in the Constitution of the French Republic. Residents of New Caledonia who have lived in New Caledonia for at least ten years will be given the right to vote, starting with the 2031 provincial elections. Such deal is to be confirmed by the French Parliament in the fourth quartile of 2025, with the deal to then be voted on by New Caledonians in 2026 as a referendum.

== Politics ==
New Caledonia is a territory sui generis to which France has gradually transferred certain powers. As such its citizens have French nationality and vote for the president of France. They have the right to vote in elections to the European Parliament. It is governed by a 54-member Territorial Congress, a legislative body composed of members of three provincial assemblies. The French State is represented in the territory by a High Commissioner. At a national level, New Caledonia is represented in the French Parliament by two deputies and two senators. At the 2012 French presidential election, the voter turnout in New Caledonia was 61.19%.

For 25 years, the party system in New Caledonia was dominated by the anti-independence The Rally–UMP. This dominance ended with the emergence of a new party, Avenir Ensemble, also opposed to independence, but considered more open to dialogue with the Kanak movement, which is part of the Kanak and Socialist National Liberation Front, a coalition of several pro-independence groups. In January 2025, Alcide Ponga was sworn in as President of the Government of New Caledonia, forming a new government following the collapse of the pro-independence government led by Louis Mapou. His leadership has been described as bringing stability following the 2024 unrest and a continuation for the country to remain within the French Republic. In October 2025, it was reported that French MPs are fighting over the bill to delay New Caledonia's provincial elections to June 2026 under the Bougival Agreement. FLNKS and left MPs objected, filing approximately 1,600 amendments, and forced a referral to a joint committee.

In January 2026, 5 parliamentary groups adopted the Elysée-Oudinot Accord to further clarify the language within the Bougival Agreement. Despite being adopted by the French Senate, a bill to further the agreements was rejected by the National Assembly after a resolution by pro-independence deputy Emmanuel Tjibaou.

=== Customary authority ===
Kanak society has several layers of customary authority, from the 4,000–5,000 family-based clans to the eight customary areas (aires coutumières) that make up the territory. Clans are led by clan chiefs and constitute 341 tribes, each headed by a tribal chief. The tribes are further grouped into 57 customary chiefdoms (chefferies), each headed by a head chief, and forming the administrative subdivisions of the customary areas.

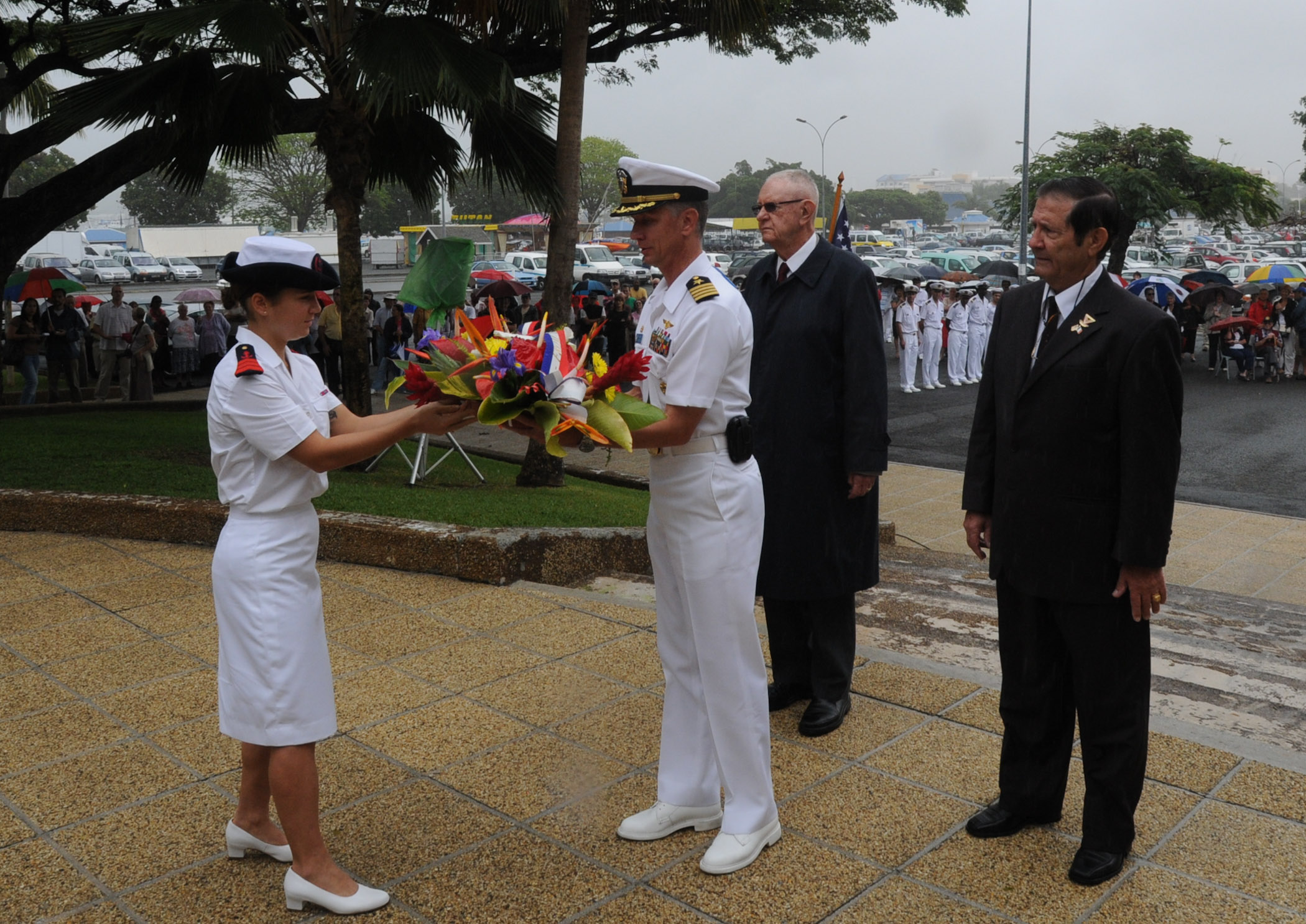
Jean Lèques during a ceremony honouring U.S. service members who helped ensure the freedom of New Caledonia during World War II

The Customary Senate is the assembly of the various traditional councils of the Kanaks, and has jurisdiction over the law proposals concerning the Kanak identity. The Customary Senate is composed of 16 members appointed by each traditional council, with two representatives per customary area. In its advisory role, the Customary Senate must be consulted on law proposals "concerning the Kanak identity" as defined in the Nouméa Accord. It also has a deliberative role on law proposals that would affect identity, the civil customary statute, and the land system. A new president is appointed each year in August or September, and the presidency rotates between the eight customary areas.

Kanak people have recourse to customary authorities regarding civil matters such as marriage, adoption, inheritance, and some land issues. The French administration typically respects decisions made in the customary system. However, their jurisdiction is sharply limited in penal matters, as some matters relating to the customary justice system, including the use of corporal punishment, are seen as clashing with the human rights obligations of France.

=== Military and gendarmerie ===
The Armed Forces of New Caledonia (French: Forces armées de Nouvelle-Calédonie, or FANC) include about 2,000 soldiers, mainly deployed in Koumac, Nandaï, Tontouta, Plum, and Nouméa. The land forces consist of a regiment of the Troupes de marine, the Régiment d'infanterie de marine du Pacifique. About 80 percent of the 700-member regiment is composed of soldiers on short-term (four month) deployments from metropolitan France. As of 2018, only about 30 personnel in the regiment were locally recruited.

The naval forces incorporate several vessels of the French Navy including: one Floréal-class frigate, Vendémiaire, the patrol and support vessel D'Entrecasteaux and two vessels of the Félix Éboué class of patrol vessels, Auguste Benebig and Jean Tranape. One EDA-S landing craft (Sabre) is also deployed to support operations in the territory, along with two RP10-class harbour tugboats.

As of 2026, French naval aviation and air force elements in New Caledonia included two Navy Falcon 200 Gardian maritime surveillance aircraft (drawn from Flotilla 25F), which, in 2027, are being replaced, on an interim basis, by the more advanced Falcon 50 aircraft. These aircraft will in turn be superseded by the new Falcon 2000 Albatros starting in about 2030. Two Casa CN235 transport aircraft and three Puma helicopters from the Air Force's 52 "Tontouta" Squadron are also deployed in New Caledonia. Prior to 2022, the frigate Vendémiaire operated the Alouette III helicopter. However, with the retirement of the type in 2022, it is being replaced by the Eurocopter Dauphin N3. In 2022, the French Air Force demonstrated a capacity to reinforce the territory by deploying three Rafale fighters, supported by A400M transport aircraft and A330 MRTT Phénix tankers, from France to New Caledonia for a three-week exercise.

In addition, some 855 personnel from the National Gendarmerie are stationed on the archipelago, divided into 4 companies, 27 brigades and several specialized, and mobile Gendarmerie units. During periods such the 2021 referendum on independence, these forces have been significantly reinforced with personnel deployed from metropolitan France. The air component includes two Écureuil helicopters while the Maritime Gendarmerie deploys the patrol boat Dumbea in the territory.

=== Status ===
New Caledonia has been a member of the Pacific Community since 1983 with Nouméa the home of the organization's regional headquarters. Since 1986, the United Nations Committee on Decolonization has included New Caledonia on the United Nations list of non-self-governing territories. An independence referendum was held the following year, but independence was rejected by a large majority.

Pyramid graph illustrating the administration of New Caledonia

Under the Nouméa Accord, signed in 1998 following a period of secessionist unrest in the 1980s and approved in a referendum, New Caledonia was granted special status. Twenty years after inception, the Nouméa Accord required an referendum on independence which was held on 4 November 2018. The result was that 56.9% of voters chose to remain with France. The Nouméa Accord required another independence referendum, which was held on 4 October 2020. The result was that 53.26% of voters chose to remain with France. The third and last referendum permitted by the Nouméa Accord was held on 12 December 2021, confirming New Caledonia as part of the French Republic with 96% voting "no" to independence after the vote was boycotted by the bulk of the Kanak population.

The official name of the territory, Nouvelle-Calédonie, could be changed in the near future due to the accord, which states that "a name, a flag, an anthem, a motto, and the design of banknotes will have to be sought by all parties together, to express the Kanak identity and the future shared by all parties." To date, however, there has been no consensus on a new name for the territory, although Kanak Republic is popular among 40% of the population. New Caledonia has increasingly adopted its own symbols, choosing an anthem, a motto, and a new design for its banknotes. In July 2010, the Congress of New Caledonia voted in favour of a wish to fly the Kanak flag of the independence movement FLNKS alongside the French tricolour, as dual flags of the territory. The wish, legally non-binding, proved controversial. A majority of New Caledonian communes, but not all, now fly both flags, the rest flying only the French Tricolour. The non-official adoption made New Caledonia one of the few countries or territories in the world with two flags. The decision to wish for the use of two flags has been a constant battleground between the two sides and led the coalition government to collapse in February 2011.

=== 2025 political talks in Paris ===
On 24 June 2025, President Emmanuel Macron extended an invitation to both pro‑ and anti‑independence leaders from New Caledonia to participate in talks in Paris starting 2 July 2025, aimed at negotiating the territory's future governance and status. Objectives of the talks include a revised political framework for New Caledonia, potentially including greater autonomy and redesigned electoral rules, socioeconomic challenges, such as the nickel-dependent economy, youth employment, and post‑unrest recovery.

On 13 July 2025, weeks of negotiations concluded with an agreement between all parties that New Caledonia should remain within France, but with far greater levels of autonomy, the status of a state, and a dual citizenship arrangement for those that wish it. The agreement will require ratification by both chambers of the French parliamentary system, followed by a referendum in New Caledonia in 2026. Initial thoughts on the deal suggest it is not what independence supporters hoped for, but statehood is a major concession by France.

On 13 August 2025, the FLNKS stated in a press conference that they had voted to reject the agreement on the basis that an independence referendum prior to France's 2027 presidential election was absent from the deal.

On 16 September 2025, the New Caledonia Congress approved once again for the third time, another postponement, regarding the election within the territory. The votes were divided to 39 out of 52 Congress members (75%) voted in favor of the postponement, while the FLNKS pro-independence group cast 13 votes against (25%).

== Administrative divisions ==
Map of the New Caledonian communes. Light gray and dark grey denotes northern and southern province, respectively.

The institutional organization is the result of the organic law and ordinary law passed by the Parliament on 16 February 1999.

The archipelago is divided into three provinces:

- South Province (province Sud). Provincial capital: Nouméa. Area: 9,407 km^{2}. Population: 212,082 inhabitants (2019).
- North Province (province Nord). Provincial capital: Koné. Area: 7,348 km^{2}. Population: 49,910 inhabitants (2019).
- Loyalty Islands Province (province des îles Loyauté). Provincial capital: Lifou. Area: 1,981 km^{2}. Population: 18,353 inhabitants (2019).

New Caledonia is further divided into 33 communes (municipalities). One commune, Poya, is divided between two provinces. The northern half of Poya, with the main settlement and most of the population, is part of the North Province, while the southern half of the commune, with only 210 inhabitants in 2019, is part of the South Province.

== Geography ==
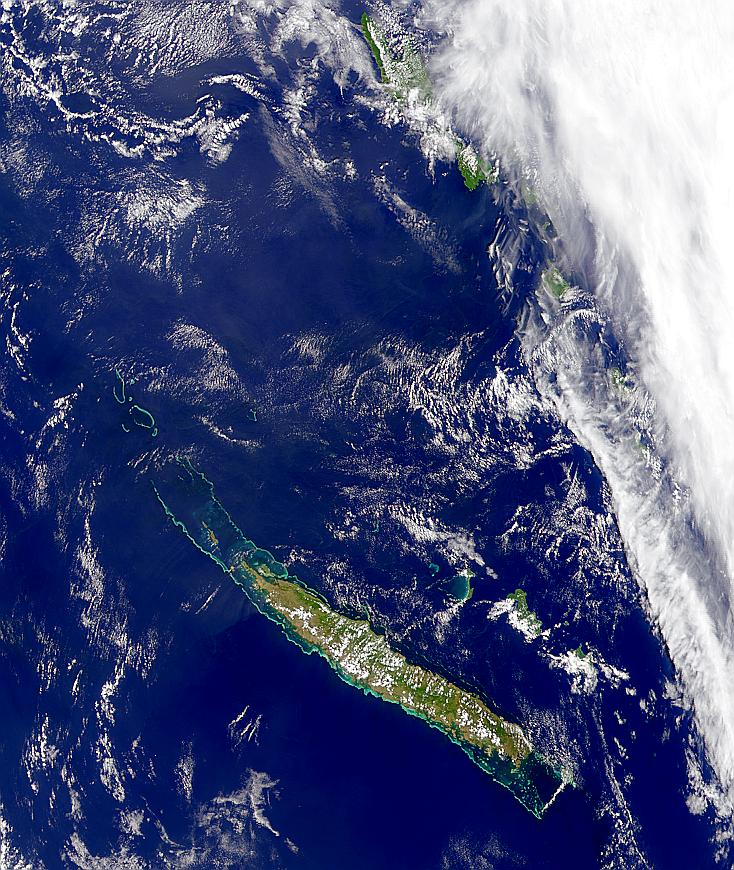
New Caledonia from space

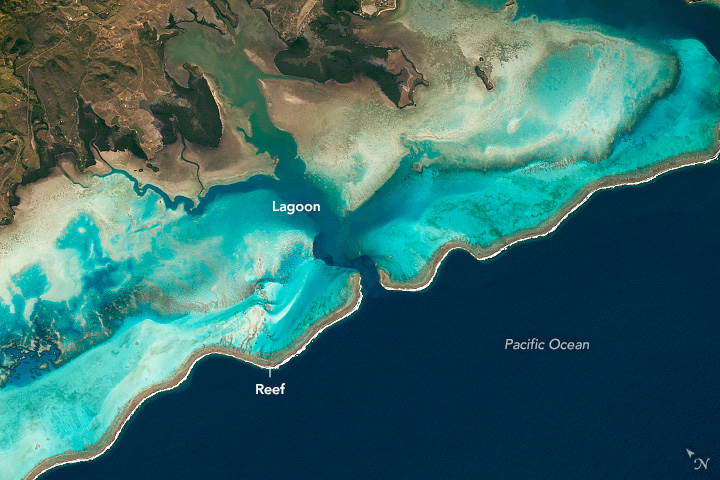
Coral reefs of New Caledonia from ISS, September 9, 2020

New Caledonia is part of Zealandia, a fragment of the ancient Gondwana super-continent, which is part of Oceania. It is speculated that New Caledonia separated from Australia roughly 66 million years ago, subsequently drifting in a north-easterly direction, reaching its present position about 50 million years ago.

The mainland is divided in length by a central mountain range whose highest peaks are Mont Panié (1,629 m or 5,344 ft) in the north and Mont Humboldt (1,618 m or 5,308 ft) in the southeast. The east coast is covered by lush vegetation. The west coast, with its large savannahs and plains suitable for farming, is a drier area. Many ore-rich massifs are found along this coast.

The Diahot River is the longest river of New Caledonia, flowing for some 100 kilometres (62 mi). It has a catchment area of 620 km^{2} (240 sq mi) and opens north-westward into the Baie d'Harcourt, flowing towards the northern point of the island along the western escarpment of the Mount Panié. Most of the island is covered by wet evergreen forests, while savannahs dominate the lower elevations. The New Caledonian lagoon, with a total area of 24,000 square kilometres (9,300 sq mi) is one of the largest lagoons in the world. The lagoon and the surrounding New Caledonian barrier reef was named a UNESCO World Heritage Site in 2008 for its exceptional beauty and marine biodiversity. In May 2023, there was an earthquake and tsunami in New Caledonia. This triggered a tsunami warning here as well as in other nearby countries.

=== Climate ===
The climate is tropical, with a hot and humid season from November to March with temperatures between 27 and 30 °C (81 and 86 °F), and a cooler, dry season from June to August with temperatures between 20 and 23 °C (68 and 73 °F), linked by two short interstices. The tropical climate is strongly moderated by the oceanic influence and the trade winds that attenuate humidity, which can be close to 80%. The average annual temperature is 23 °C, with historical extremes of 2.3 and 39.1 °C (36.1 and 102.4 °F).

The rainfall records show that precipitation differs greatly within the island. The 3,000 millimetres (120 in) of rainfall recorded in Galarino are three times the average of the west coast. There are also dry periods, because of the effects of El Niño. Between December and April, tropical depressions and cyclones can cause winds to exceed a speed of 100 kilometres per hour (62 mph), with gusts of 250 kilometres per hour (160 mph) and very abundant rainfall. The last cyclone affecting New Caledonia was Cyclone Niran, in March 2021.

== Environment ==
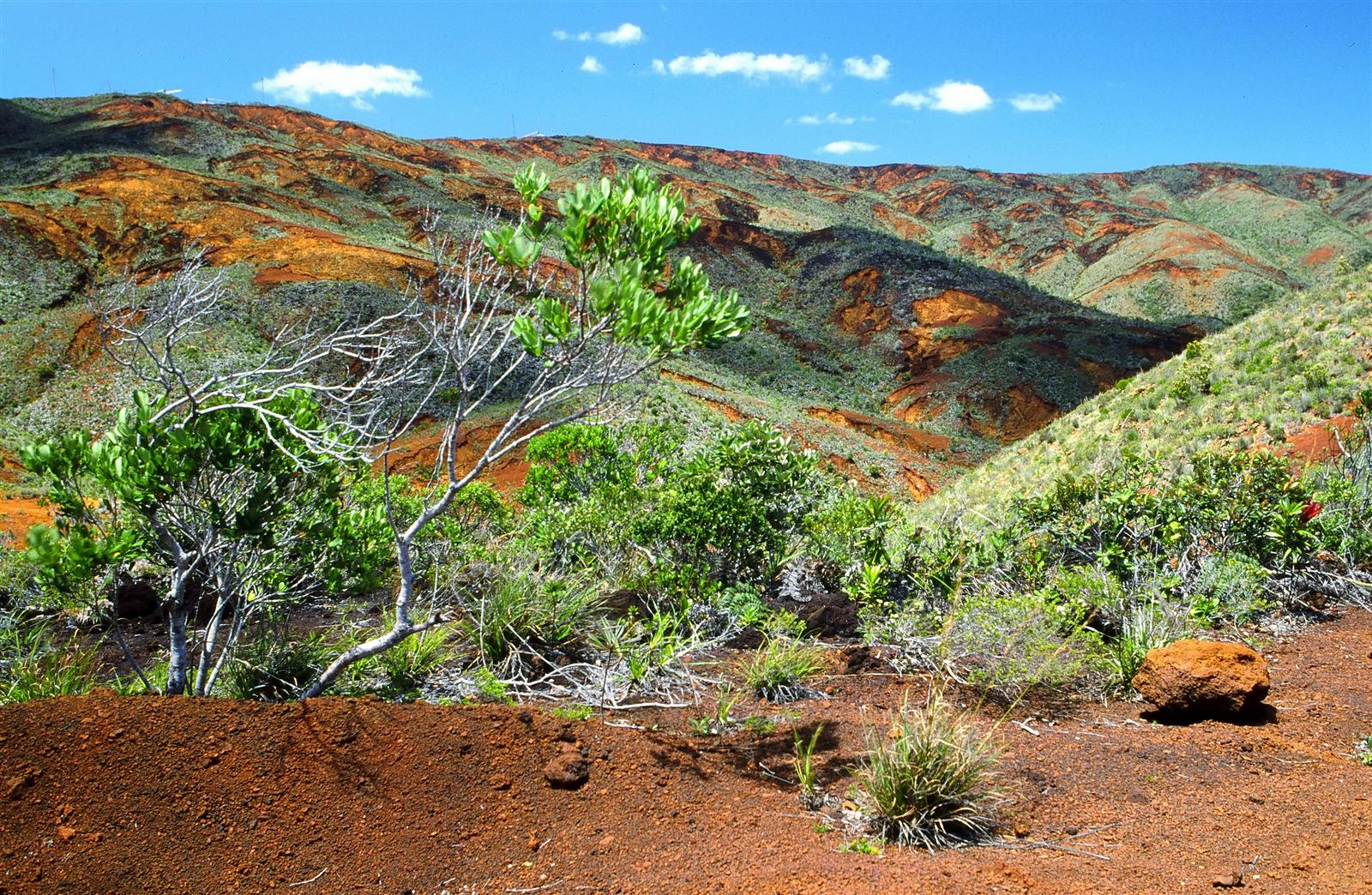
Landscape in the south of New Caledonia

New Caledonia has many unique taxa, especially birds and plants. It has the richest diversity in the world per square kilometre. The biodiversity is caused by Grande Terre's central mountain range, which has created a variety of niches, landforms and micro-climates where endemic species thrive.

Largely due to its nickel industry, New Caledonia emits a high level of carbon dioxide per person compared to other countries. In 2019, it emitted 55.25 tons of CO_{2} per person, compared to 4.81 for France. The combination of the exceptional biodiversity of New Caledonia and its threatened status has made it one of the most critical biodiversity hotspots on Earth.

In 2001, Bruno Van Peteghem was awarded the Goldman Environmental Prize for his efforts on behalf of the Caledonian ecological protection movement in the face of "serious challenges" from Jacques Lafleur's RPCR party. Progress has been made in a few areas in addressing the protection of New Caledonia's ecological diversity from fire, industrial and residential development, unrestricted agricultural activity and mining (such as the judicial revocation of INCO's mining licence in June 2006 owing to claimed abuses).

In 2008, six lagoons of the New Caledonian barrier reef, the world's longest continuous barrier reef system, were inscribed on the UNESCO World Heritage List.

=== Flora ===
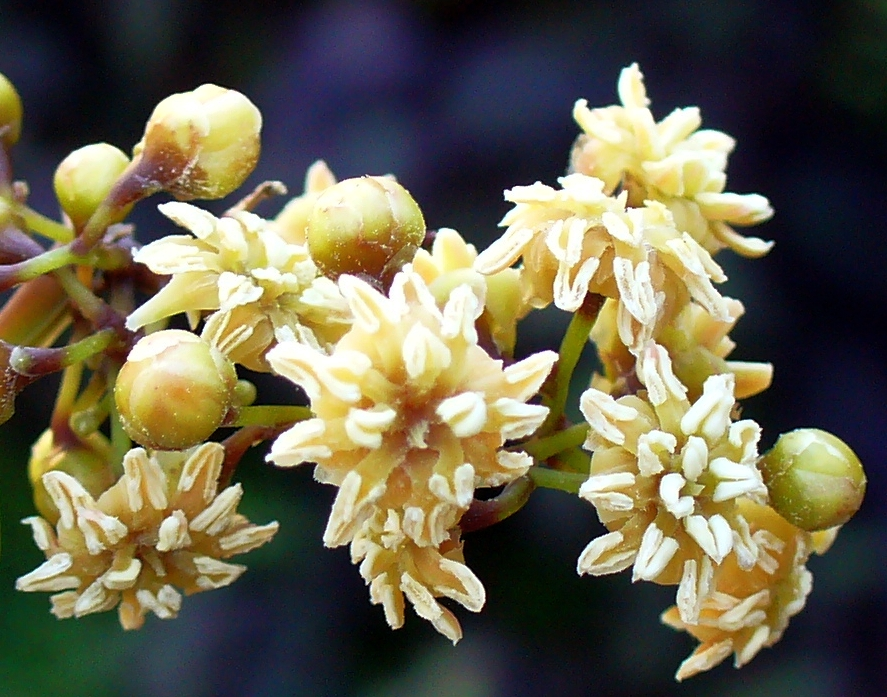
Amborella, the world's oldest living lineage of flowering plant

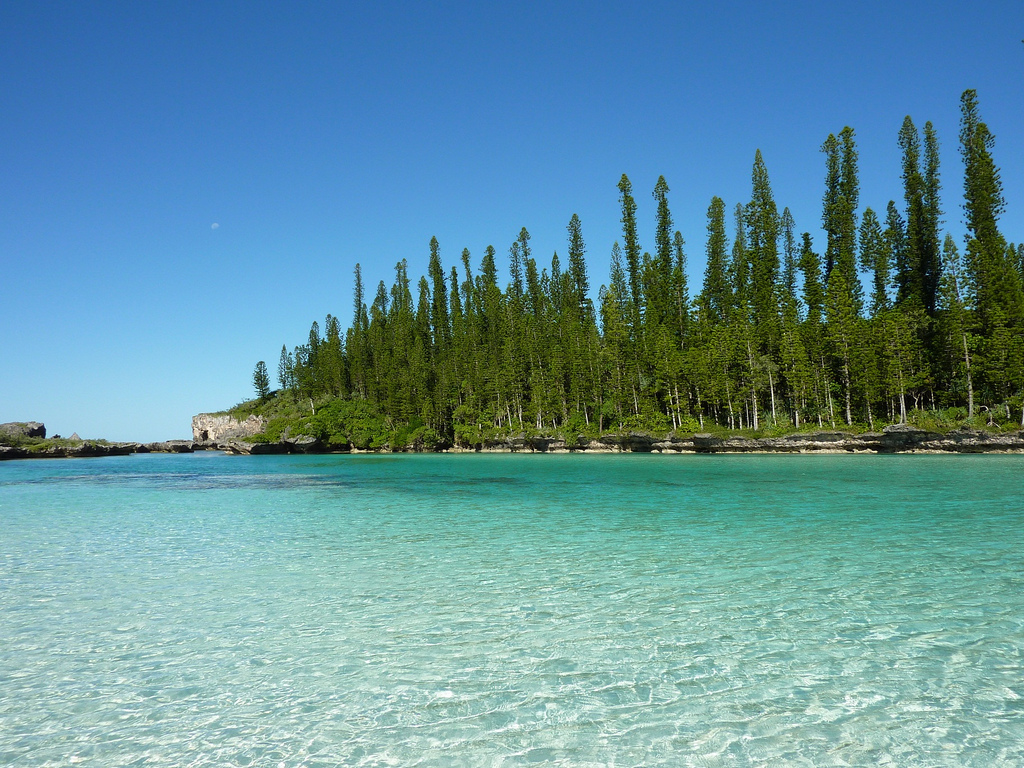
Araucaria columnaris on the Isle of Pines

New Caledonia's fauna and flora derive from ancestral species isolated in the region when it broke away from Gondwana many tens of millions of years ago. Not only endemic species have evolved here, but entire genera, families, and even orders are unique to the islands.

More tropical gymnosperm species are endemic to New Caledonia than to any similar region on Earth. Of the 44 indigenous species of gymnosperms, 43 are endemic, including the only known parasitic gymnosperm (Parasitaxus usta). Also, of the 35 known species of Araucaria, 13 are endemic to New Caledonia. New Caledonia also has the world's most divergent lineage of flowering plant, Amborella trichopoda, which is at, or near, the base of the clade of all flowering plants.

The world's largest extant species of fern, Sphaeropteris intermedia, also is endemic to New Caledonia. It is very common on acidic soil, usually found on fallow ground or in forest clearings, and grows about one metre per year on the east coast. There also are other species of tree ferns, notably Sphaeropteris novae-caledoniae and the New Caledonian fork fern, (Tmesipteris oblanceolata) which has the largest genome known in a eukaryotic organism.

New Caledonia also is one of five regions on the planet where species of southern beeches (Nothofagus) are indigenous; five species are known to occur here.

New Caledonia has its own version of maquis (maquis minier) occurring on metalliferous soils, mostly in the south. The soils of ultramafic rocks (mining terrains) have been a refuge for many native flora species which are adapted to the toxic mineral content of the soils, to which most foreign species of plants are poorly suited, which has therefore prevented invasion into the habitat or displacement of indigenous plants.

Two terrestrial ecoregions lie within New Caledonia's territory: New Caledonia rain forests and New Caledonia dry forests.

=== Fauna ===
In addition to its outstanding plant diversity and endemism, New Caledonia also provides habitat for a wide diversity of animals. Over 100 bird species live in New Caledonia, of which 24 are endemic. One of these endemic bird species is the New Caledonian crow, a bird noted for its tool-making abilities, which rival those of primates. These crows are renowned for their extraordinary intelligence and ability to fashion tools to solve problems, and make the most complex tools of any animal yet studied apart from humans.

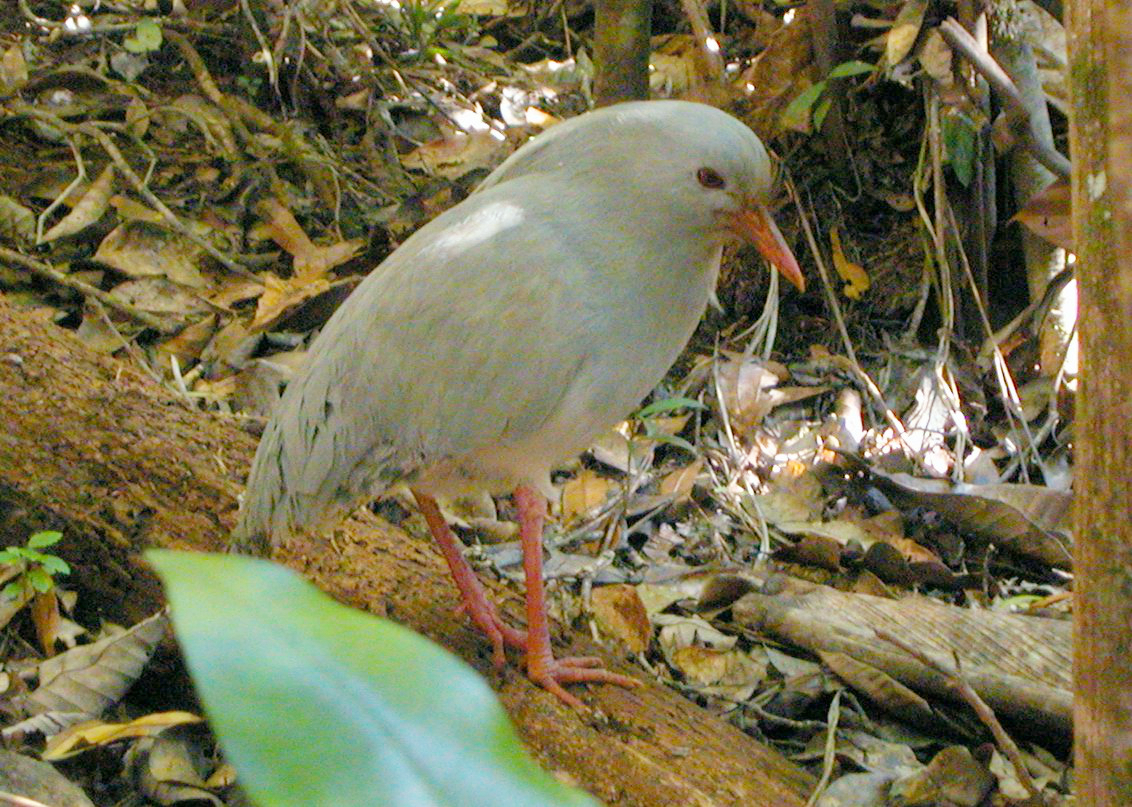
The kagu, an endemic flightless bird

The endemic kagu, agile and able to run quickly, is a flightless bird, but it is able to use its wings to climb branches or glide. Its sound is similar to the bark of a dog. It is the surviving member of monotypic family Rhynochetidae, order Eurypygiformes.

There are 11 endemic fish species and 14 endemic species of decapod crustaceans in the rivers and lakes of New Caledonia. Some, such as Neogalaxias, exist only in small areas. The nautilus—considered a living fossil and related to the extinct ammonites—occurs in Pacific waters around New Caledonia. There is a large diversity of marine fish in the surrounding waters, which are within the extents of the Coral Sea.

Despite its large number of bird, reptile, and fish species, New Caledonia has remarkably few mammal species: nine, of which six are endemic.

Several species of New Caledonia are remarkable for their size: Ducula goliath is the largest extant species of arboreal pigeon; Rhacodactylus leachianus, the largest gecko in the world; Phoboscincus bocourti, a large skink thought to be extinct until rediscovered in 2003.

Much of New Caledonia's fauna present before human settlement is now extinct, including Sylviornis, a bird over a metre tall not closely related to any living species, and Meiolania, a giant horned turtle that diverged from living turtles during the Jurassic period.

In January 2024, a court in the Capital Nouméa issued a ruling banning the culling of sharks citing it as disproportionate. The culls began after an Australian tourist was killed by a shark in the previous year.

== Demographics ==
Historical populations
Year	Pop.	±% p.a.
1956	68,480	—
1963	86,519	+3.72%
1969	100,579	+2.60%
1976	133,233	+4.03%
1983	145,368	+1.26%
1989	164,173	+2.06%
1996	196,836	+2.61%
2009	245,580	+1.68%
2014	268,767	+1.79%
2019	271,407	+0.19%
2025	264,596	−0.45%
ISEE

At the last census in April 2025, New Caledonia had a population of 264,596, down from 271,407 at the September 2019 census, as people left the territory due to an economic crisis and recent unrest. Of these 264,596 people, 18,671 lived in the Loyalty Islands Province, 50,947 in the North Province, and 194,978 in the South Province.

Between the 2019 and 2025 censuses, the North Province and the Loyalty Islands registered a population increase of 2.1% and 1.7% respectively, whereas the South Province registered a population decline of 4.0%, as newcomers recently arrived in the Greater Nouméa area, in particular Kanak people, left Nouméa and relocated in the rest of New Caledonia due to the depressed economy in the Greater Nouméa area following the 2024 unrest and urban riots.

30% of the population was under the age of 20, with the ratio of older people in the total population increasing. Two out of three residents of New Caledonia live in Greater Nouméa. 78% were born in New Caledonia. The total fertility rate decreased from 2.2 children per woman in 2014 to 1.9 in 2019.

=== Ethnic groups ===
Ethnic Groups in New Caledonia (2019 Census)
Ethnic Groups	percent
Kanak	41.2%
European	24.1%
"Caledonian" or not stated	7.5%
Mixed	11.3%
Wallisian/Futunian	8.3%
Tahitian	2.0%
Javanese	1.4%
Ni-Vanuatu	0.9%
Vietnamese	0.8%
Other Asian	0.4%
Other	2.1%

At the 2019 census, 41.2% of the population reported belonging to the Kanak community (up from 39.1% at the 2014 census) and 24.1% to the European (Caldoche and Zoreille) community (down from 27.2% at the 2014 census). A further 7.5% of the population either self-identified as "Caledonian" or refused to declare an ethnic group (down from 9.9% at the 2014 census). Most of the people who self-identify as "Caledonian" or refuse to declare an ethnic group are thought to be ethnically European.

The other self-reported communities were Wallisians and Futunians (8.3% of the total population, up from 8.2% at the 2014 census), Indonesians who are from the Javanese ethnic group (1.4% of the total population, the same as in 2014), Tahitians (2.0% of the total population, down from 2.1% at the 2014 census), Ni-Vanuatu (0.9%, down from 1.0% at the 2014 census), Vietnamese (0.8%, down from 0.9% at the 2014 census), and other Asians (primarily ethnic Chinese; 0.4% of the total population, the same as in 2014).

11.3% of the population reported belonging to multiple communities (mixed race) (up from 8.6% at the 2014 census). The question on community belonging, which had been left out of the 2004 census, was reintroduced in 2009 under a new formulation, different from the 1996 census, allowing multiple choices (mixed race) and the possibility to clarify the choice "other" (which led many Europeans to self-identify as "Caledonian" in the category "other", or to select several ethnic communities, such as both European and Kanak, thus appearing as mixed race, which is particularly the case for the Caldoches living in the bush, who often have mixed ancestry).

Finally, 2.1% of the population reported belonging to other communities to the exclusion of "Caledonian" (up from 1.3% at the 2014 census).

The Kanak people, part of the ethnic Melanesian group, are indigenous to New Caledonia. Their social organization is traditionally based on clans, which identify as either "land" or "sea" clans, depending on their original location and the occupation of their ancestors. According to the 2019 census, the Kanak constitute 95% of the population in the Loyalty Islands Province, 72% in the North Province and 29% in the South Province. The Kanak tend to be of lower socio-economic status than the Europeans and other settlers.

Europeans first settled in New Caledonia when France established a penal colony on the archipelago. Once the prisoners had completed their sentences, they were given land to settle. According to the 2014 census, of the 73,199 Europeans in New Caledonia, 30,484 were native-born, 36,975 were born in Metropolitan France, 488 were born in French Polynesia, 86 were born in Wallis and Futuna, and 5,166 were born abroad. The Europeans are divided into several groups. The Caldoches are usually defined as those born in New Caledonia who have ancestral ties that span back to the early French settlers. They often settled in the rural areas of the western coast of Grande Terre, where many continue to run large cattle properties.

Distinct from the Caldoches are those who were born in New Caledonia from families that had settled more recently, and are called simply Caledonians. The Metropolitan French-born migrants who come to New Caledonia are called Métros or Zoreilles, indicating their origins in metropolitan France. There is also a community of about 2,000 pieds noirs, descended from European settlers in France's former North African colonies; some of them are prominent in anti-independence politics, including Pierre Maresca, a leader of the RPCR.

A 2015 documentary by Al Jazeera English asserted that up to 10% of New Caledonia's population is descended from around 2,000 Arab-Berber people deported from French Algeria in the late 19th century to prisons on the island in reprisal for the Mokrani Revolt in 1871. After serving their sentences, they were released and given land to own and cultivate as part of colonisation efforts on the island. As the overwhelming majority of the Algerians imprisoned on New Caledonia were men, the community was continued through intermarriage with women of other ethnic groups, mainly French women from nearby women's prisons. Despite facing both assimilation into the Euro-French population and discrimination for their ethnic background, descendants of the deportees have succeeded in preserving a common identity as Algerians, including maintaining certain cultural practices (such as Arabic names) and in some cases Islamic religion. Some travel to Algeria as a rite of passage, though obtaining Algerian citizenship is often a difficult process. The largest population of Algerian-Caledonians lives in the commune of Bourail (particularly in the Nessadiou district, where there is an Islamic cultural centre and cemetery), with smaller communities in Nouméa, Koné, Pouembout, and Yaté.

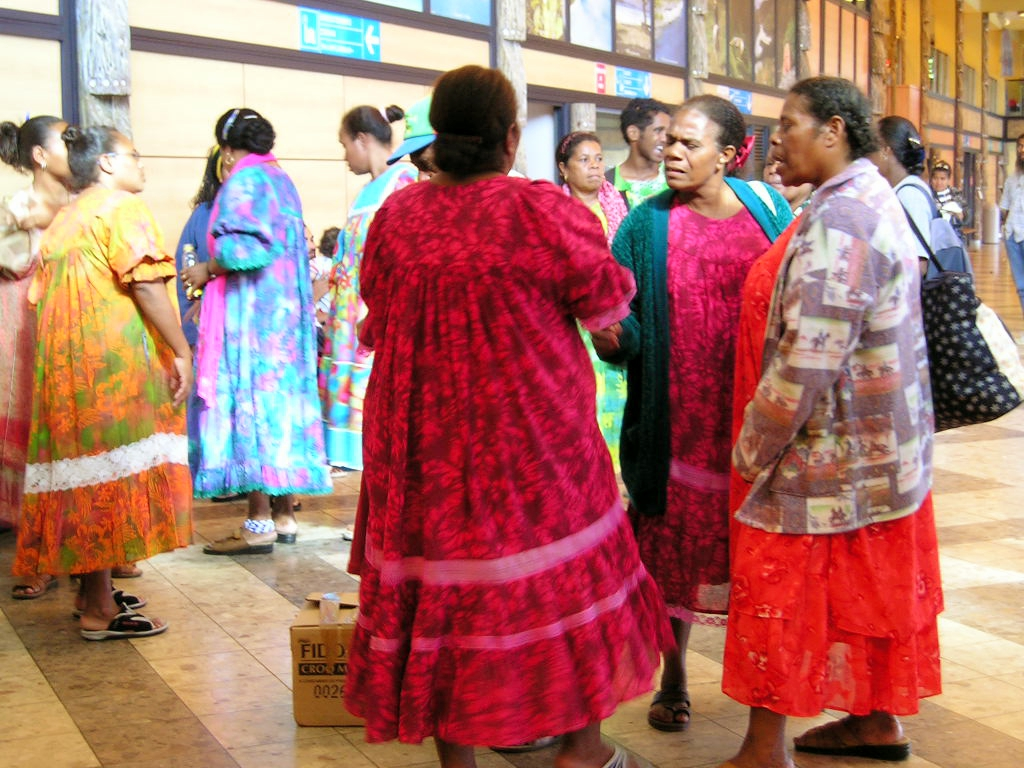
Kanak women

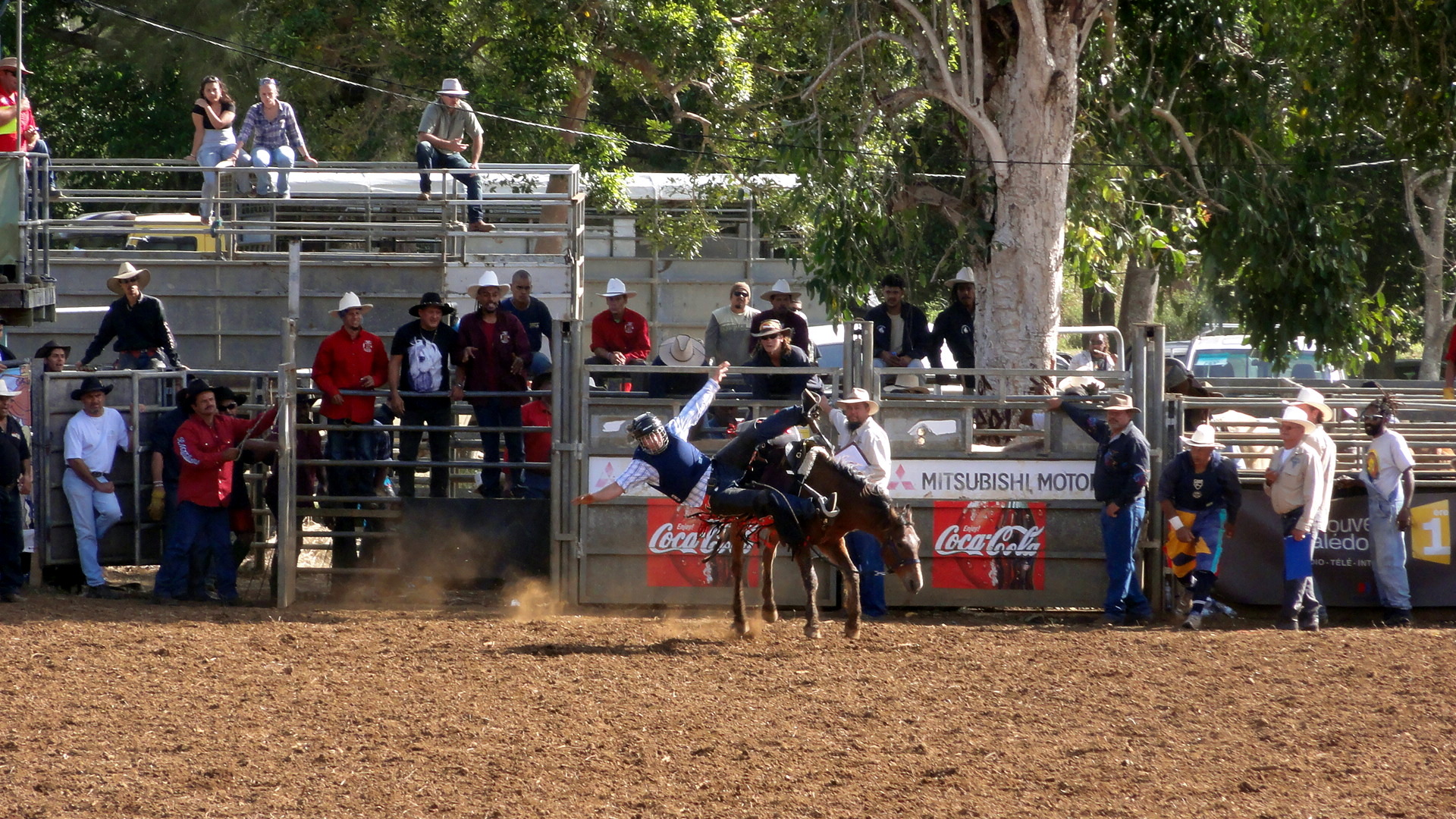
Rodeos (here at the annual fair of Bourail) are part of Caldoche culture.

=== Languages ===
The French language began to spread with the establishment of French settlements, and French is now spoken even in the most secluded villages. For a long time the level of fluency varied significantly across the population as a whole, primarily due to the absence of universal access to public education before 1953, and also due to immigration and ethnic diversity, but the French language has now become universal among the younger generations as shown by the censuses of population. At the 2009 census, 97.3% of people aged 15 or older reported that they could speak, read and write French, whereas only 1.1% reported that they had no knowledge of French. No questions regarding the knowledge of French were asked in the 2014 and 2019 censuses, on account of the population's nearly universal understanding of it.

The 28 Kanak languages spoken in New Caledonia are part of the Oceanic group of the Austronesian family. Eight of these can be chosen by parents as optional subjects for their children from kindergarten to high school (four languages are taught up to the bachelor's degree) and an academy is responsible for their promotion. The three most widely spoken indigenous languages are Drehu (spoken in Lifou), Nengone (spoken on Maré) and Paicî (northern part of Grande Terre). Others include Iaai (spoken on Ouvéa). At the 2019 census, 44.0% of people whose age was 15 or older reported that they had some form of knowledge of at least one Kanak language (up from 41.3% at the 2009 census), whereas 56.0% reported that they had no knowledge of any of the Kanak languages (down from 58.7% at the 2009 census).

Other significant language communities among immigrant populations include speakers of Wallisian, Futunian, Tahitian, Javanese, Vietnamese, Chinese, and Bislama.

=== Religion ===
Religion in New Caledonia according to the Global Religious Landscape survey by the Pew Forum, 2012
1. Christianity (85.2%)
2. No religion (10.4%)
3. Islam (2.80%)
4. Buddhism (0.60%)
5. Folk religion (0.20%)
6. Others (0.80%)

The predominant religion is Christianity; half of the population is Catholic, including most of the Europeans, West Uveans, and Vietnamese and half of the Melanesian and Polynesian minorities. Catholicism was introduced by French colonists. The island also has numerous Protestant churches, of which the Free Evangelical Church and the Evangelical Church in New Caledonia and the Loyalty Islands have the largest number of adherents; their memberships are almost entirely Melanesian. Protestantism gained ground in the late 20th century and continues to expand. There are also numerous other Christian groups and more than 6,000 Muslims. (See Islam in New Caledonia and Baháʼí Faith in New Caledonia.) Nouméa is the seat of the Archdiocese of Nouméa.

== Education ==
Education in New Caledonia is based on the French curriculum and delivered by both French teachers and French-trained teachers. Under the terms of the 1998 Nouméa Accord, primary education is the responsibility of the three provinces. As of 2010, secondary education was in the process of being transferred to the provinces. The majority of schools are located in Nouméa but some are found in the islands and the north of New Caledonia. When students reach high school age, most are sent to Nouméa to continue their secondary education. Education is compulsory from the age of six years.

New Caledonia's main tertiary education institution is the University of New Caledonia (Université de la Nouvelle-Calédonie), which was founded in 1993 and comes under the supervision of the Ministry of Higher Education, Research and Innovation. It is based in Nouméa and offers a range of vocational, Bachelor, MA, and PhD programs and courses. The University of New Caledonia consists of three academic departments, one institute of technology, one PhD school, and one teachers' college. As of 2013, the university has approximately 3,000 students, 107 academics, and 95 administrative and library staff. Many New Caledonian students also pursue scholarships to study in metropolitan France. As part of the Nouméa Accord process, a Cadre Avenir provides scholarships for Kanak professionals to study in France.

== Economy ==
Region	Total GDP, nominal, 2019 (billion US$)	GDP per capita, nominal, 2019 (US$)
Australia	1,388.09	54,391
New Zealand	210.76	42,274
Hawaii	93.24	63,997
Papua New Guinea	24.75	2,315
New Caledonia	9.48	34,939
Guam	6.36	37,794
French Polynesia	6.02	21,673
Fiji	5.44	6,079
Solomon Islands	1.62	2,278
Northern Mariana Islands	1.18	24,670
Vanuatu	0.93	3,187
Samoa	0.91	4,472
American Samoa	0.65	13,352
Tonga	0.45	4,435
Federated States of Micronesia	0.39	4,001
Cook Islands	0.39	22,752
Palau	0.28	15,992
Marshall Islands	0.23	5,275
Kiribati	0.22	1,847
Wallis and Futuna	0.21	18,360
Nauru	0.13	10,567
Tuvalu	0.05	5,277

New Caledonia has one of the largest economies in the South Pacific, with a GDP of US$9.48 billion in 2019. The nominal GDP per capita was US$34,939 (at market exchange rates) in 2019. It is lower than the nominal GDP per capita of Hawaii, Australia, New Zealand, and Guam, but higher than all other independent and non-sovereign countries and territories in Oceania, although there is significant inequality in income distribution, and long-standing structural imbalances between the economically dominant South Province and the less developed North Province and Loyalty Islands. The currency in use in New Caledonia is the CFP franc, as of May 2020, pegged to the euro at a rate of 119.3 CFP to 1.00 euros. It is issued by the Institut d'Émission d'Outre-Mer.

Real GDP grew by an average of +3.3% per year in the first half of the 2010s, boosted by rising worldwide nickel prices and an increase in domestic demand due to rising employment, as well as strong business investments, but by only +0.2% per year in the second half of the 2010s, as the local nickel industry entered a period of crisis and the repeated independence referendums have generated economic uncertainty. In 2017, exports of goods and services from New Caledonia amounted to 1.93 billion US dollars, 77.5% of which were mineral products and alloys (mainly nickel ore and ferronickel) and 5.0% exports of hotel and restaurant services (i.e. international tourism in New Caledonia). Imports of goods and services amounted to 3.48 billion US dollars. 40.9% of the imports of goods came from Metropolitan France and its overseas departments, 11.7% from Singapore (essentially fuel), 11.5% from Australia, 5.0% from other countries in the European Union, 4.2% from China and Hong Kong, 4.1% from New Zealand, 3.7% from South Korea, 2.4% from Japan, 2.0% from the United States, 1.9% from Canada, and 12.6% from other countries. The trade deficit in goods and services stood at 1.55 billion US dollars in 2017.

Financial support from France is substantial, representing more than 15% of the GDP, and contributes to the health of the economy. Tourism is underdeveloped, with 100,000 visitors a year, compared to 400,000 in the Cook Islands and 200,000 in Vanuatu. Much of the land is unsuitable for agriculture, and food accounts for about 20% of imports. According to FAOSTAT, New Caledonia is a significant producer of: yams (33rd); taro (44th); plantains (50th); coconuts (52nd). The exclusive economic zone of New Caledonia covers 1.4 million square kilometres (0.54 million square miles). The construction sector accounts for roughly 12% of GDP, employing 9.9% of the salaried population in 2010. Manufacturing is largely confined to small-scale activities such as the transformation of foodstuffs, textiles and plastics.

GDP (nominal) per capita in 2019 (US$)
$0 – $5,000 $5,000 – $10,000 $10,000 – $20,000 $20,000 – $30,000 $30,000 – $45,000 $45,000 – $60,000 $60,000 – $90,000

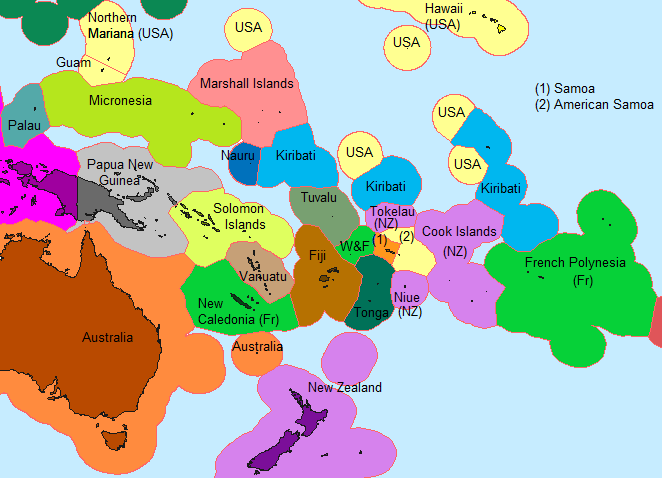

=== Nickel sector ===
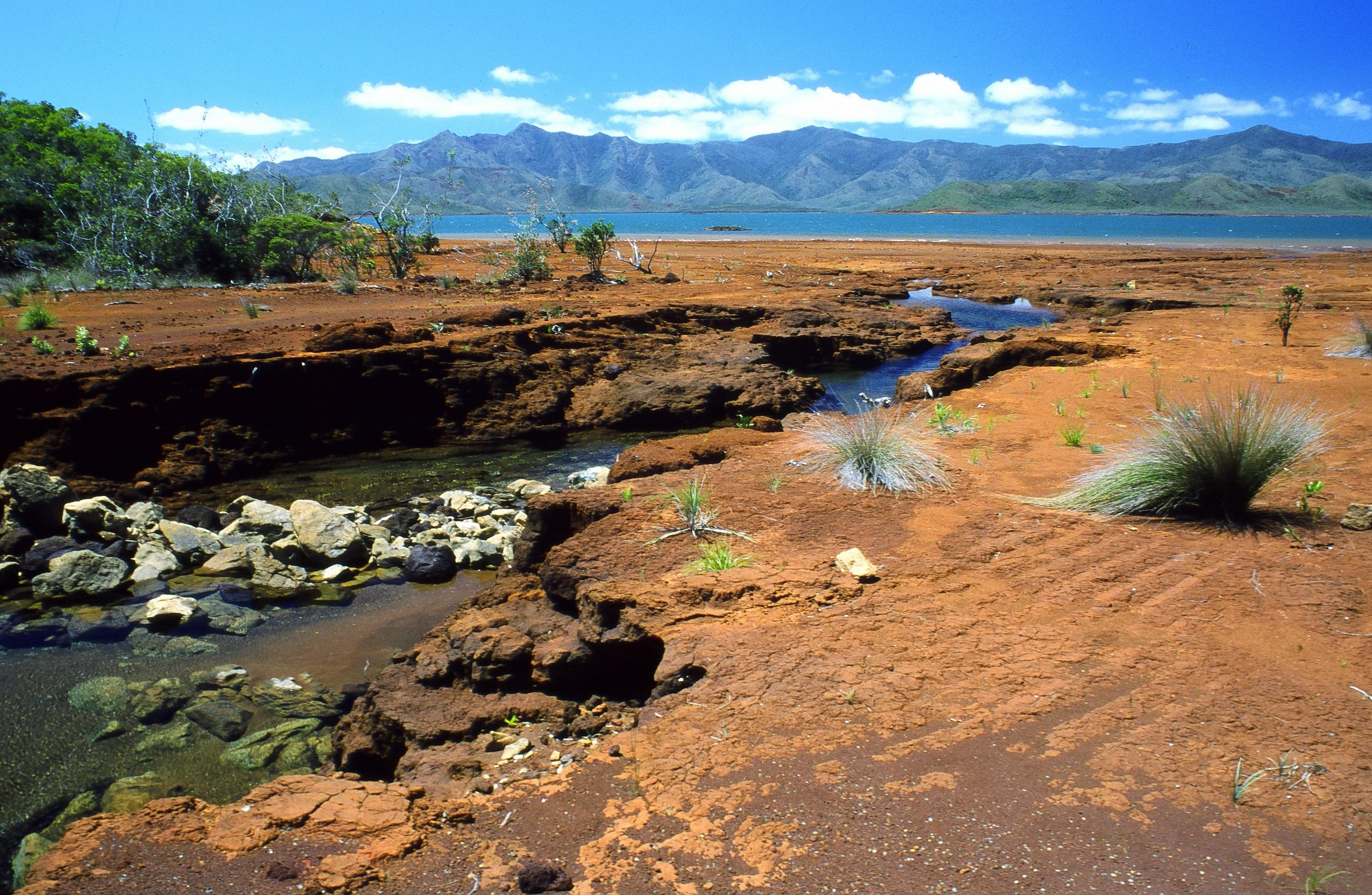
A creek in southern New Caledonia. Red colours reveal the richness of the ground in iron oxides and nickel.

New Caledonian soils contain about 25% of the world's nickel resources. The late-2000s recession has gravely affected the nickel industry, as the sector faced a significant drop in nickel prices (−31.0% year-on-year in 2009) for the second consecutive year. The fall in prices has led a number of producers to reduce or stop altogether their activity, resulting in a reduction of the global supply of nickel by 6% compared to 2008.

This context, combined with bad weather, has forced the operators in the sector to revise downwards their production target. Thus, the activity of mineral extraction has declined by 8% in volume year on year. The share of the nickel sector as a percentage of GDP fell from 8% in 2008 to 5% in 2009. A trend reversal and a recovery in demand have been recorded early in the second half of 2009, allowing a 2.0% increase in the local metal production. A March 2020 report stated that "New Caledonia is the world's fourth largest nickel producer, which has seen a 26% rally in prices in the past year". According to industry sources however, the Goro mine has never met its potential capacity to produce "60,000 tpy of nickel in the form of nickel oxide, due to design flaws and operational commissioning issues" In 2019, it produced slightly over a third of its annual capacity".

In March 2021, Tesla agreed to a partnership with the Goro Mine, a "technical and industrial partnership to help with product and sustainability standards along with taking nickel for its battery production, according to the agreement", according to a BBC News report. The majority owner, Vale, said that the deal will be of long-term benefit in terms of jobs and the economy. Tesla is a heavy user of nickel for making the lithium-ion batteries and wanted to "secure its long-term supply".

Also in March 2021, a part of Vale's nickel business was sold "to a consortium called Prony, which includes Swiss commodity trader Trafigura". Provincial authorities and businesses in New Caledonia would have a 51% stake in the Vale operation.

== Culture ==
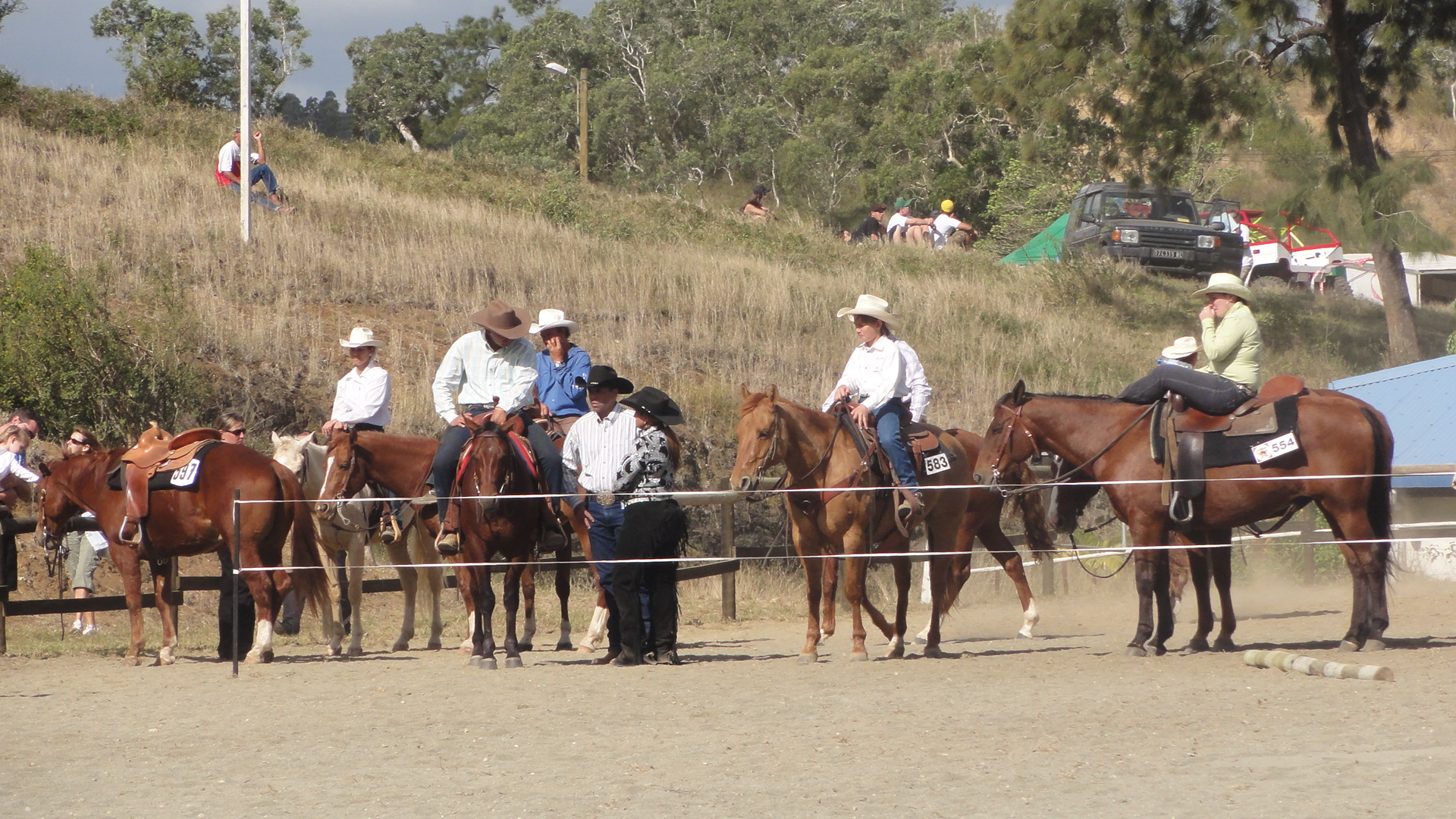
Caldoches, European people born in New Caledonia

Wood carving, especially of the houp (Montrouziera cauliflora), is a contemporary reflection of the beliefs of the traditional tribal society, and includes totems, masks, chambranles, or flèche faîtière, a kind of arrow that adorns the roofs of Kanak houses. Basketry is a craft widely practised by tribal women, creating objects of daily use.

The Jean-Marie Tjibaou Cultural Centre, designed by Italian architect Renzo Piano and opened in 1998, celebrates Kanak culture.

The Kaneka is a form of local music, inspired by reggae and originating in the 1980s.

The Mwâ Ka is a 12-metre (39 ft) totem pole commemorating the French annexation of New Caledonia, and was inaugurated in 2005.

== Media ==
Les Nouvelles Calédoniennes is the only daily newspaper in the archipelago. A monthly publication, Le Chien bleu, parodies the news from New Caledonia.

There are five radio stations: the public service broadcaster RFO radio Nouvelle-Calédonie, Océane FM (the collectivity's newest station), the youth-oriented station NRJ, Radio Djiido (established by Jean-Marie Tjibaou), and Radio Rythmes Bleus. The last two stations are primarily targeted to the various Kanak groups who are indigenous to New Caledonia ("Djiido" is a term from the Fwâi language, spoken in Hienghène in the North Province, denoting a metal spike used to secure straw thatching to the roof of a traditional Kanak house).

As for television, the public service broadcaster France Télévisions operates a local channel, Réseau Outre-Mer 1re, along with France 2, France 3, France 4, France 5, France 24 and Arte which all broadcast from Paris. Canal Plus Calédonie carries 17 digital channels in French, including Canal+ and TF1. Analogue television broadcasts ended in September 2011, completing the digital television transition in New Caledonia. Bids for two new local television stations, NCTV and NC9, were considered by the French broadcasting authorities. NCTV was launched in December 2013.

The media are considered to be able to operate freely, but Reporters Without Borders raised concerns in 2006 about "threats and intimidation" of RFO staff by members of a pro-independence group.

== Sport ==
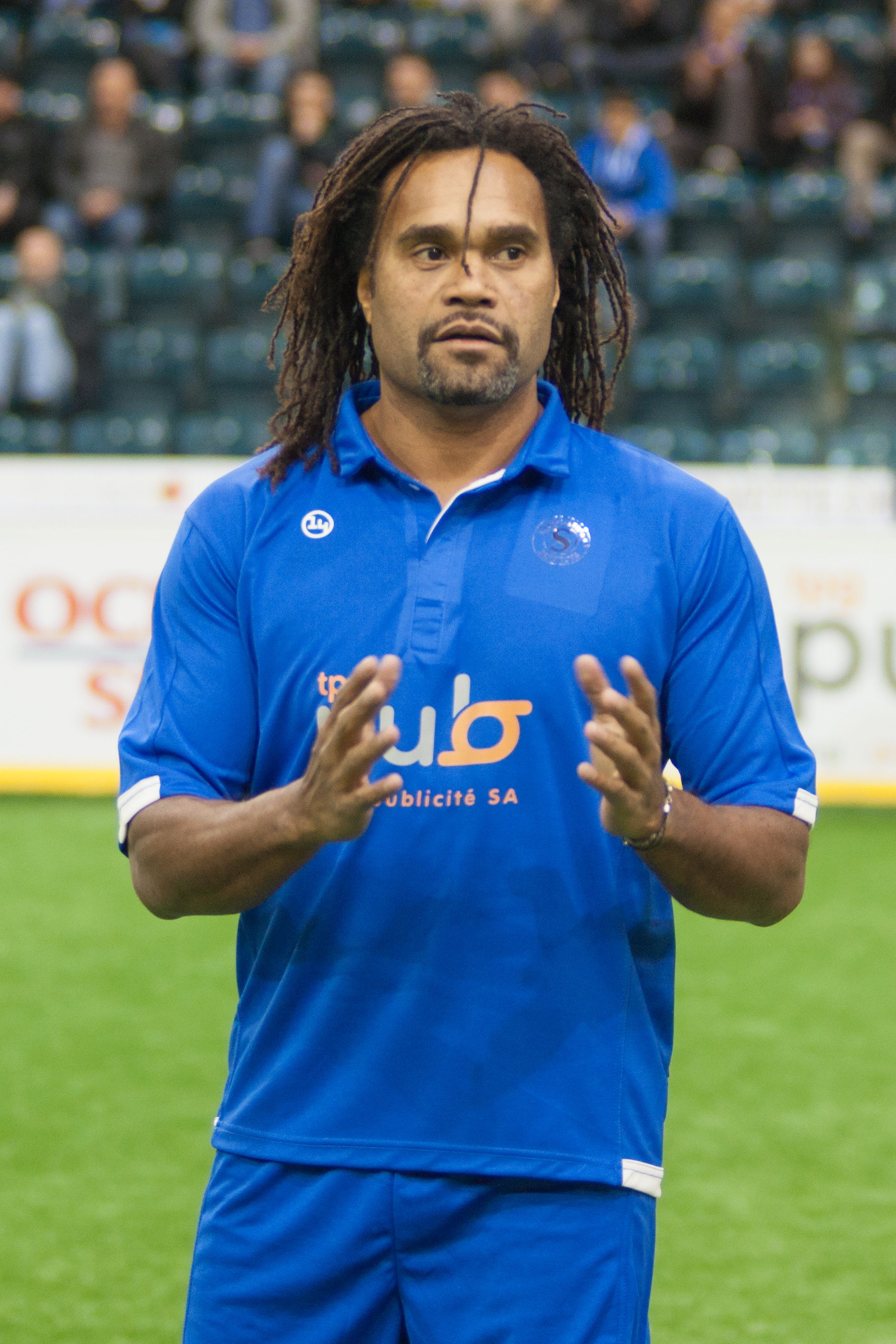
New Caledonian footballer Christian Karembeu, 1998 FIFA World Cup winner with France

The largest sporting event to be held in New Caledonia is a round of the FIA Asia Pacific Rally Championship (APRC).

The New Caledonia football team began playing in 1950, and was admitted into FIFA, the international association of football leagues, in 2004. Prior to joining FIFA, New Caledonia held observer status with the Oceania Football Confederation, and became an official member of the OFC with its FIFA membership. They have won the South Pacific Games five times, most recently in 2007, and have placed third on two occasions in the OFC Nations Cup. Christian Karembeu is a prominent New Caledonian former footballer. The under-17 team qualified for the FIFA under 17 World Cup in 2017.

Basketball gets much public attention in New Caledonia by both press and fans. Its national team has won plenty of medals in the Oceania region. New Caledonia's top basketball club teams are AS 6e Km and AS Dumbea.

Horse racing is also very popular in New Caledonia, as are women's cricket matches.

The rugby league team participated in the Pacific Cup in 2004. In 2020, plans were formed to create a Rugby League team in New Caledonia, Pacifique Trieze, to eventually join the majority Australian Queensland Cup.

New Caledonia also has a national synchronised swimming team, which tours abroad.

The "Tour Cycliste de Nouvelle-Calédonie" is a multi-day cycling stage race that is held usually in October. The race is organised by the Comite Cycliste New Caledonia. The race attracts riders from Australia, New Zealand, France, Réunion (Overseas France), Europe and Tahiti (French Polynesia). Australian Brendan Washington has finished last three times in the race between 2005 and 2009, and is known in New Caledonia as "The Lanterne Rouge".

The New Caledonia Handball team won the Oceania Handball Nations Cup in 2008 held in Wellington, New Zealand. They beat Australia in the final.

The Internationaux de Nouvelle-Calédonie is a tennis tournament that is held in the first week of January. Since 2004, the tournament is part of the ATP Challenger Tour, and players usually compete as a preparation for the Australian Open. the first Grand Slam of the year.

The New Caledonia women's national volleyball team won the gold medal on several occasions.

== Cuisine ==
Due to low levels of domestic horticulture, fresh tropical fruits feature less highly in New Caledonian cuisine than in other Pacific nations, instead relying on rice, fish and root vegetables such as taro. One way this is frequently prepared is in a buried-oven-style feast, known as bougna. Wrapped in banana leaves, the fish, taro, banana and other seafood are buried with hot rocks to cook, then dug up and eaten.

== Transport ==
La Tontouta International Airport is 50 km (31 mi) northwest of Nouméa, and connects New Caledonia with Sydney, Auckland, Brisbane, Singapore, Bangkok, Papeete, Nadi, Wallis and Port Vila. Most internal air services are operated by the international carrier Aircalin. Cruise ships dock at the Gare Maritime in Nouméa. The passenger-and-cargo boat Havannah sails to Port Vila, Malicolo and Santo in Vanuatu once a month.

New Caledonia's road network consists of:

- Route territoriale 1 (RT1), going from the exit from Nouméa to the Néhoué River, north of Koumac;
- Route territoriale 2, on Lifou Island and from the Lifou Airport to the south of Wé;
- Route territoriale 3, from the junction with RT1 in Nandi up to the Tiwaka River;
- Route territoriale 4, from the junction with RT1 near Muéo to the power plant.

== See also ==
- Bougival Accord – 2025 accord on New Caledonian status in France
- d'Entrecasteaux Ridge – Double oceanic ridge in the south-west Pacific Ocean
- Kanak and Socialist National Liberation Front – Political coalition in New Caledonia
- Lists of islands

== Sources ==
- Anaya, James (23 November 2011). "Report of the Special Rapporteur on the rights of indigenous peoples on the situation of Kanak people in New Caledonia, France" (PDF). United Nations General Assembly. A/HRC/18/35/Add.6. Archived from the original (PDF) on 9 November 2017 – via JamesAnaya.org.
