= Kanak and Socialist National Liberation Front =

Political coalition in New Caledonia

Kanak and Socialist National Liberation Front Front de libération nationale kanak et socialiste
- Leader: Victor Tutugoro
- Founded: 1984; 42 years ago
- Headquarters: Nouméa
- Ideology: Kanak nationalism Separatism; Melanesian socialism Anti-imperialism; Left-wing nationalism
- Political position: Left-wing
- National affiliation: Democratic and Republican Left group
- International affiliation: Non-Aligned Movement (observer)
- Colours: Red
- Seats in the National Assembly: 0 / 2 (0%)
- Seats in the Senate: 0 / 2 (0%)
- Seats in the Congress: 6 / 54 (11%)
- Seats in the South Province: 7 / 40 (18%)
- Seats in the North Province: 0 / 22 (0%)
- Seats in the Loyalty Islands Province: 0 / 14 (0%)

Party flag

The Kanak and Socialist National Liberation Front (French: Front de libération nationale kanak et socialiste, FLNKS) is a pro-independence alliance of political parties in New Caledonia. It was founded in 1984 at a congress of various political parties. Its supporters are mostly from the Kanak indigenous population but also include supporters from other ethnic communities. The FLNKS is internationally recognized by the Melanesian Spearhead Group (MSG).

== History ==
It is composed of the Caledonian Union (UC) (a centre-left formerly multi-ethnic party dating back to the early postwar period) on the one hand and the National Union for Independence (UNI) on the other. The UNI includes Melanesian Progressive Union (a political movement based on the island's west coast and mainly around the village of Poya, where its founder, the late Edmond Nekiriai, came from), the Oceanian Democratic Rally (a Polynesian (Wallisian-and-Futunian) based party) and the Party of Kanak Liberation (PALIKA), a more radical party founded by left-leaning students that came back from France after the May 1968 riots. Both the UC and UNI are of approximately equal size, and with varying rhetoric. However, all support the independence of New Caledonia. The party boycotted the 1987 independence referendum and the 2021 independence referendum.

=== Ouvéa crisis and the Matignon accords ===
In April 1988, Alphonse Dianou and other FLNKS members attacked the gendarmerie on the island of Ouvéa, killing 4 and taking 27 as hostage, precipitating the Ouvéa cave hostage taking crisis. The French refused to negotiate and instead sent in the GIGN and other special forces, who rescued all hostages but lost two men and killed 19 hostage-takers. 3 were later alleged to have been captured alive but shot execution-style afterwards, while Dianou was allegedly beaten up and intentionally left to bleed to death from a shot wound to the knee.

Later the same year, the Matignon Agreements were signed by FLNKS leader Jean-Marie Tjibaou, with France agreeing to a series of institutional and economical provisions for the Kanaks, New Caledonians agreeing not to raise the issue of independence for 10 years, and both sides agreeing to an amnesty of the events in Ouvéa. This was viewed as traitorous by extremist elements in the FLNKS, who assassinated Tjibaou and his deputy Yeiwéné Yeiwéné on 4 May 1989.

=== After Matignon ===
The party has been divided since the early 1990s between the Caledonian Union and UNI, and, as a result, the two factions often run candidates and lists against each other and neither can agree on a leader of the FLNKS. The coalition only has a spokesperson, Victor Tutugoro.

An attempt to re-unite the party was made on the occasion of the 2007 legislative elections in France, in which both New Caledonian constituencies were up for election. In New Caledonia's 1st constituency, Charles Washetine, a member of UNI-Palika, ran with a Caledonian Union running mate. In New Caledonia's 2nd constituency, the leader of the Caledonian Union, Charles Pidjot, ran with a UNI-Palika running mate. However, both were defeated by the candidates of The Rally-UMP.

The FLNKS ran a common list in the South Province in the 2009 election which obtained 8.82% and 4 seats in the province. In the province during the 2004 elections, the pro-independence faction was divided and did not win any seats.

== Presidents ==
- Jean-Marie Tjibaou (1984–1989)
- Paul Néaoutyine (1989–1995)
- Roch Wamytan (1995–2001)

== See also ==
- Ouvéa cave hostage taking
- Ilaïsaane Lauouvéa
