= Indigenous peoples of Oceania =

The Indigenous people of Oceania are Aboriginal Australians, Papuans, and Austronesians (Melanesians, (Note: Including Torres Strait Islanders) Micronesians, and Polynesians). These indigenous peoples have a historical continuity with pre-colonial societies that developed on their territories. With the notable exceptions of Australia, New Zealand, Hawaii, New Caledonia, Guam, and Northern Mariana Islands, indigenous people make up the majority of the populations of Oceania.

This differs from the term Pacific Islanders, which usually excludes Indigenous Australians, and may be understood to include both indigenous and non-indigenous populations of the Pacific Islands alike.

== History ==
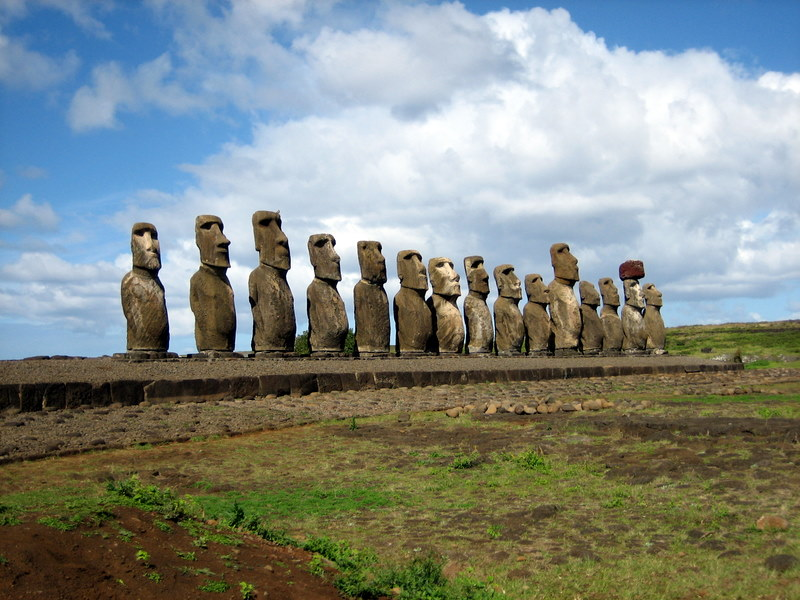
Moai in Ahu Tongariki, Rapa Nui

Australia and most of the islands of the Pacific Ocean were colonized in waves of migrations from Southeast Asia spanning many centuries. American, European and Japanese colonial expansion brought most of the region under foreign administration, in some cases as settler colonies that displaced or marginalized the original populations. During the 20th century several of these former colonies gained independence and nation-states were formed under local control. However, various peoples have put forward claims for indigenous recognition where their islands are still under external administration; examples include the Chamorros of Guam and the Northern Marianas, and the Marshallese of the Marshall Islands, and the Native Hawaiians of Hawaii.

In the pre-Columbian era, humans never reached the handful of oceanic eastern Pacific islands beyond Easter Island, which itself was settled by the Polynesian Rapa Nui people. Eastern Pacific islands such as the Galápagos and Juan Fernández Islands, while inhabitable, did not have a population of Indigenous Americans or Indigenous Oceanians, which helped them form their own unique ecosystems. Author Don Macnaughtan wrote in 2014, "The last places to be reached were in the southwest Pacific, and in the far eastern Pacific. Settlers reached all the way to Easter Island, 2,300 miles from the coast of South America, by about 700 AD. In the southwest Pacific, voyaging canoes reached New Zealand around 1250 AD, and the remote, cool and windy archipelago of the Chatham Islands around 1500 AD (New Zealand was in fact the last major land mass on the planet settled by humans – Iceland was settled about 800 AD, and Madagascar some hundreds of years earlier.) After New Zealand, the Pacific was full, and long-range voyaging began to decline quite rapidly. A few habitable Pacific islands were never found until Europeans entered the ocean – they rank as amongst the last places on earth discovered by humans. These include the Galápagos Islands, Cocos Island, the Revillagigedos Archipelago, and the Juan Fernández Islands off the coast of South America; Lord Howe Island in the Tasman Sea between Australia and New Zealand; and Midway Island, northwest of Hawaii. They are some of the few places on the planet which have never had an 'indigenous' population." Lord Howe Island was politically integrated into the Australian state of New South Wales, despite being nearly 800 kilometers removed, and Midway is now an unincorporated territory of the United States. All oceanic islands of the eastern Pacific (excluding Clipperton) were eventually annexed by Central America and South America, after going unclaimed for a few hundred years following their initial discoveries. They are now politically associated with those regions, in addition to sometimes being associated with Oceania. The sparse number of current inhabitants are primarily Spanish-speaking Mestizos. A percentage of Easter Islanders have race-mixed with Mestizo settlers from their current political administrators, Chile, and it has gradually become a bilingual island, where both Spanish and their native language is spoken. Despite this, the inhabitants still view themselves as Polynesians, and by extension Indigenous Oceanians, not South Americans. Linguistics in Oceania (1971) and Island Realm: A Pacific Panorama (1974) both have broad definitions of Oceania, and define eastern Pacific settlers and post-colonial Easter Islanders as making up a Spanish-speaking segment of Oceania.

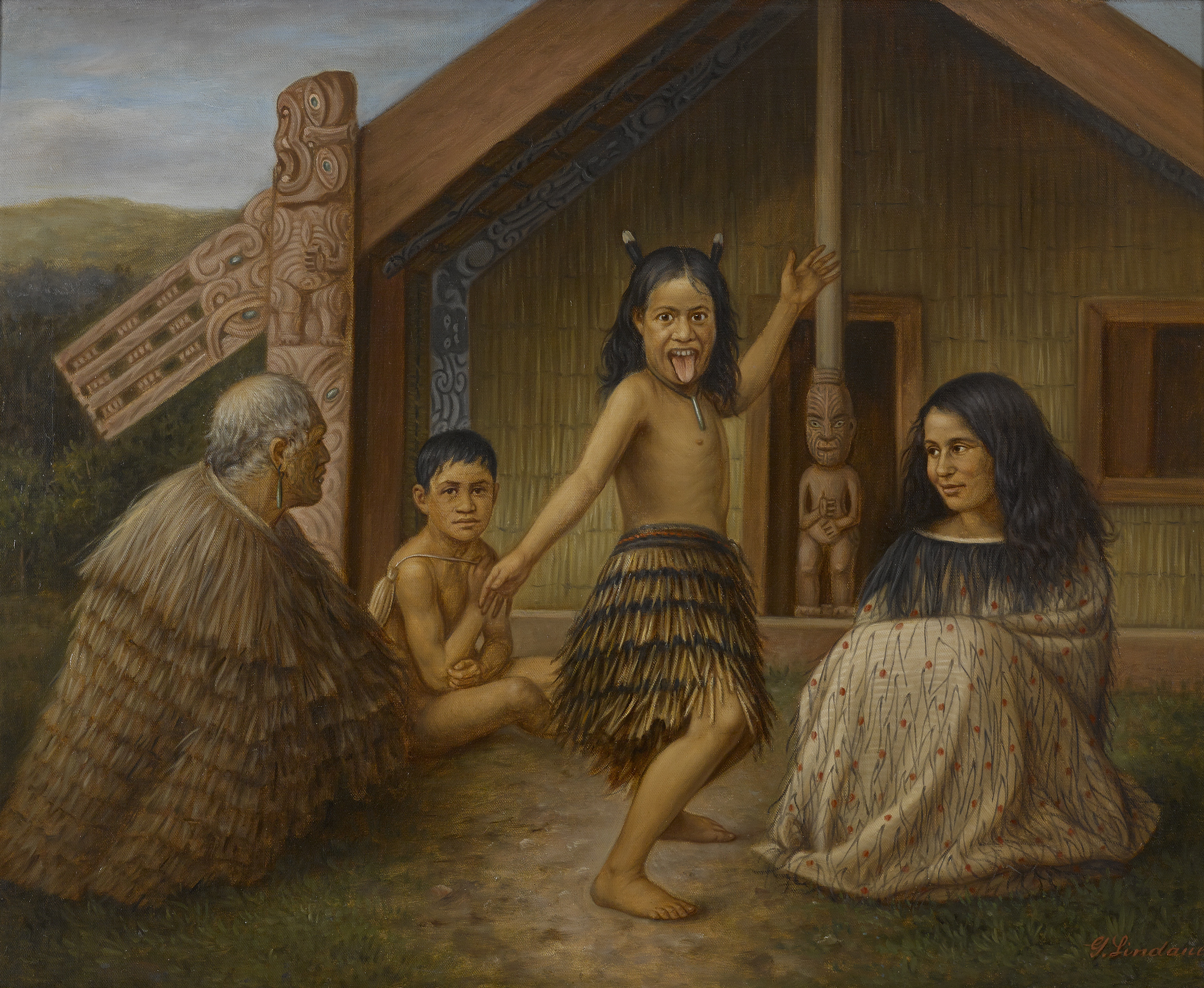
Māori child learning the haka in a painting by Gottfried Lindauer

The Bonin Islands, located about 1,000 to 2,000 kilometers from Tokyo, are commonly thought to have been uninhabited during pre-Columbian times, even though there may have possibly been a Micronesian presence on the islands approximately 2,000 years ago. The islands are still sometimes associated with Oceania, despite now having become politically integrated into Japan. Today, they are sparsely inhabited by Japanese citizens, with a proportion having European and European American ancestry. The European proportion are not recent immigrants, but rather descendants of early settlers, as the islands were not always within the sphere of Japanese colonial influence. Islanders primarily speak Japanese, and like with those in the eastern Pacific, they could be interpreted as one of the smaller linguistic groups in Oceania.

Remoter and more uninhabitable islands adjacent to Micronesia may have had fleeting contact with Indigenous Oceanians, with Howland Island and Wake Island being examples. Norfolk Island (adjacent to Melanesia) and Pitcairn Islands (adjacent to Polynesia) were uninhabited when discovered by Europeans, but there is substantial evidence of prehistoric Indigenous Oceanian settlement. Pitcairn currently have a population of around 50, who are entirely mixed-race Anglo Euronesians. They are descended from an initial group of Anglo and Polynesian settlers in the 18th century. Pitcairn was later annexed by Britain, while Norfolk Island became an external territory of Australia, who are over 1,500 kilometers removed. Norfolk's present population is mostly European Australian, some are also Euronesians; these individuals are descended from Pitcairn Islanders that were relocated to Norfolk in 1852 because of overpopulation. The Micronesia adjacent islands became unincorporated territories of the United States, and they all have no permanent residents. The United States government restrict access to outsiders on some islands.

=== Decolonization ===
Oceania is generally considered the least decolonized region in the world. In his 1993 book France and the South Pacific since 1940, Robert Aldrich commented:

With the ending of the Trust Territory of the Pacific Islands, the Northern Mariana Islands became a 'commonwealth' of the United States, and the new republics of the Marshall Islands and the Federated States of Micronesia signed compacts of free association with Washington. Britain's high commissioner in New Zealand continues to administer Pitcairn, and the other former British colonies remain members of the Commonwealth of Nations, recognizing the British Queen as their titular head of state and vesting certain residual powers in the British government or the Queen's representative in the islands. Australia did not cede control of the Torres Strait Islands, inhabited by a Melanesian population, or Lord Howe and Norfolk Island, whose residents are of European ancestry. New Zealand retains indirect rule over Niue and Tokelau and has kept close relations with another former possession, the Cook Islands, through a compact of free association. Chile rules Easter Island (Rapa Nui) and Ecuador rules the Galápagos Islands. The Aboriginals of Australia, the Māori of New Zealand and the native Polynesians of Hawaii, despite movements demanding more cultural recognition, greater economic and political considerations or even outright sovereignty, have remained minorities in countries where massive waves of migration have completely changed society. In short, Oceania has remained one of the least completely decolonized regions on the globe.

— Robert Aldrich (1993),

== Demographics ==
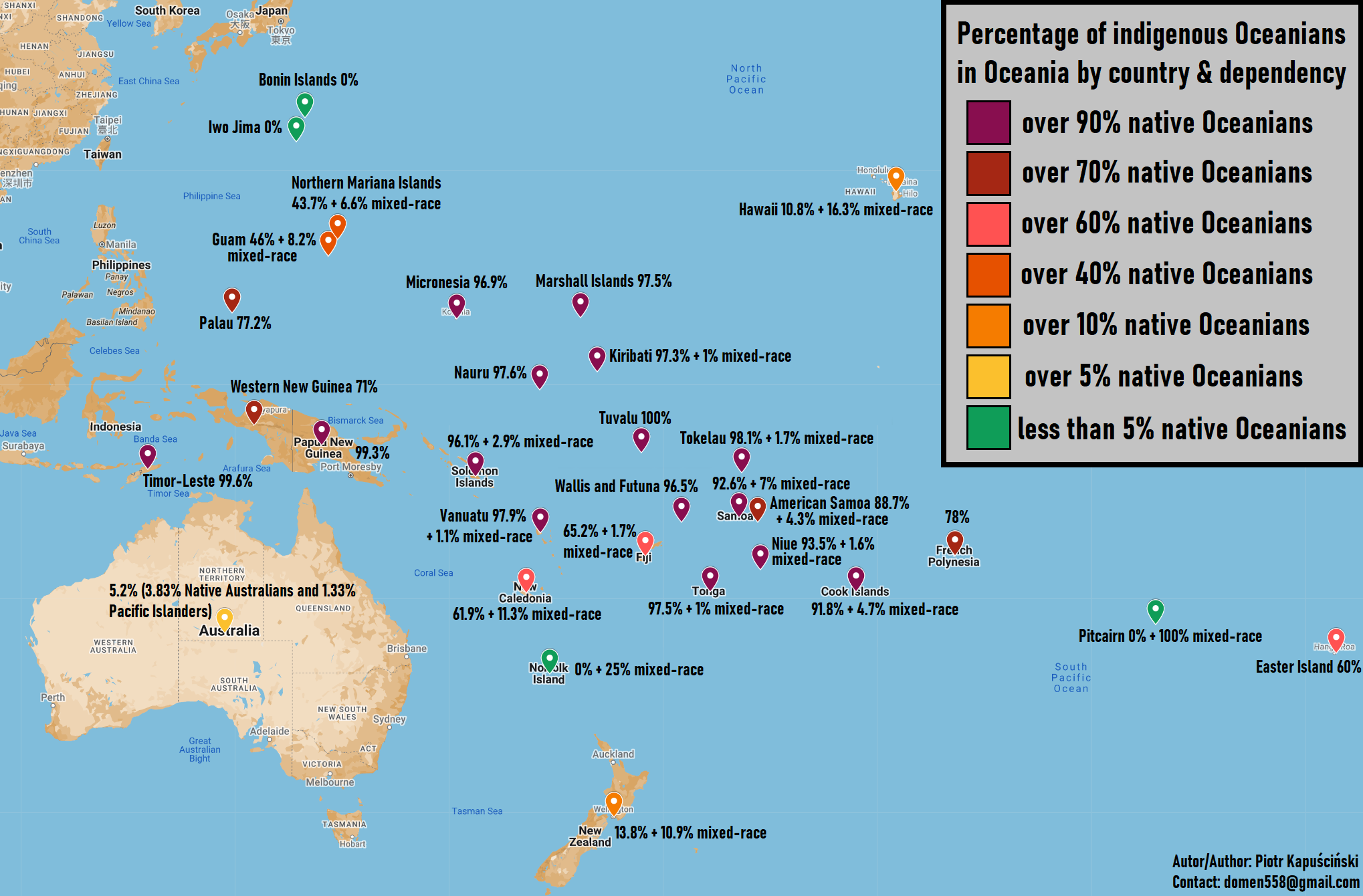
Percentage of indigenous peoples of Oceania in Oceania by country

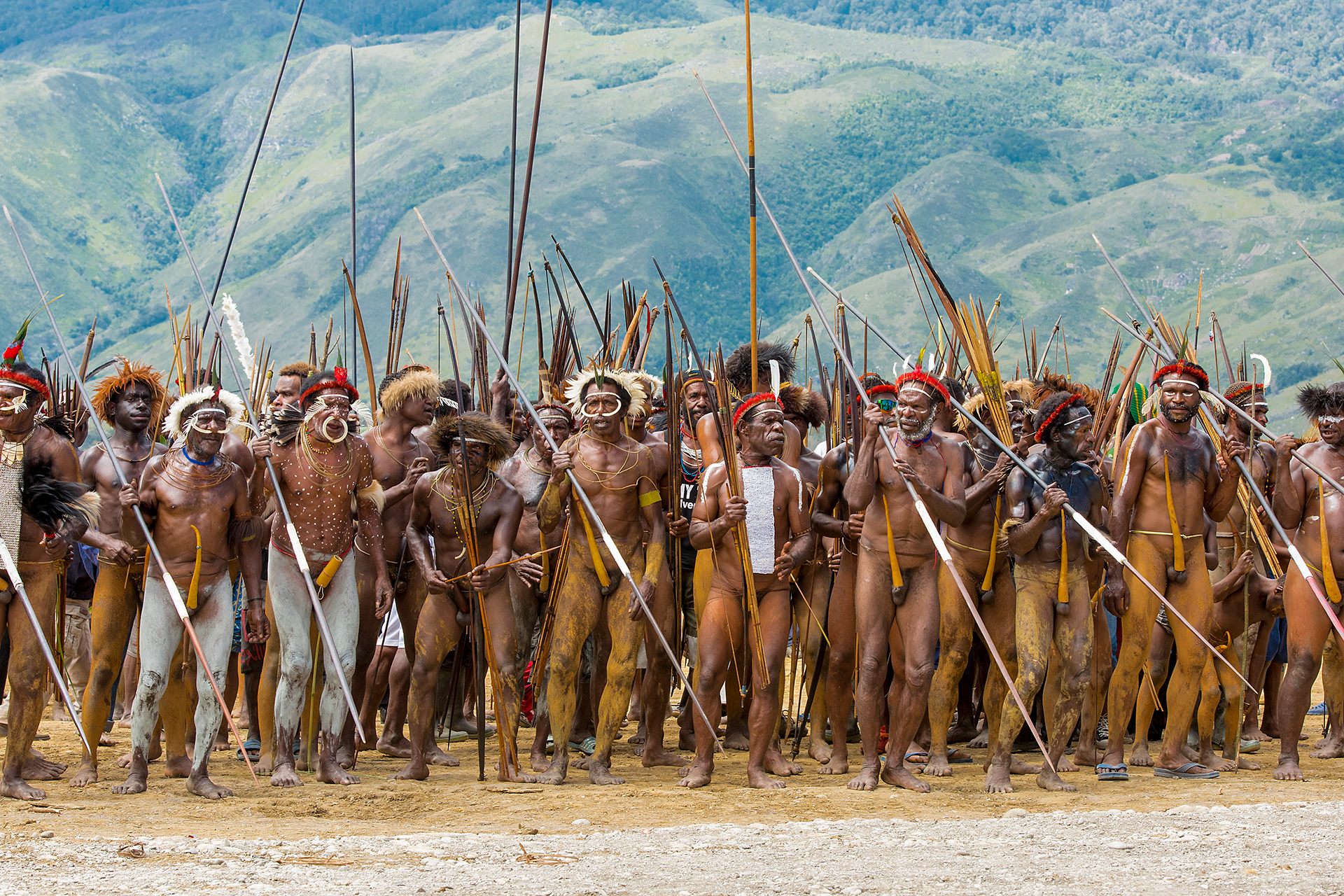
Dani people from the Baliem Valley in Highland Papua, Indonesia

In New Zealand, according to the 2018 census, 16% of the population identified as being of Māori descent. Many of those same people also identified as being descended from other ethnic groups, such as European.

The indigenous peoples of Australia are the Indigenous Australians, who account for 2.5% of the total population according to 2011 census figures. The term 'Indigenous Australians' refers to both the Aboriginal peoples of mainland Australia and Torres Strait Islander peoples. Of the total 'Indigenous Australian' population, 90% identified as Aboriginal only, 6% identified as Torres Strait Islander and the remaining 4% identified as being of both Aboriginal and Torres Strait Islander origin.

Papua New Guinea (PNG) has a majority population of indigenous societies, with some 700+ different tribal groups recognised out of a total population of just over 5 million. The PNG Constitution and other Acts identify traditional or custom-based practices and land tenure, and explicitly sets out to promote the viability of these traditional societies within the modern state. However, several conflicts and disputes concerning land use and resource rights continue between indigenous groups, the government and corporate entities.

=== Migration between countries and territories in Oceania ===
Austronesian and Polynesian migrations

There are around 15,000 Micronesians in Hawaii. Many report having experienced discrimination.

In 2013, Auckland, New Zealand had the largest population of Pacific Islanders of any city in the world with around 200,000 people living in the city.

Australia has the third largest Polynesian population, in addition to having the largest Fijian population outside of Fiji.

== List of countries and islands by ethnocultural grouping ==
=== Indigenous Australian ===
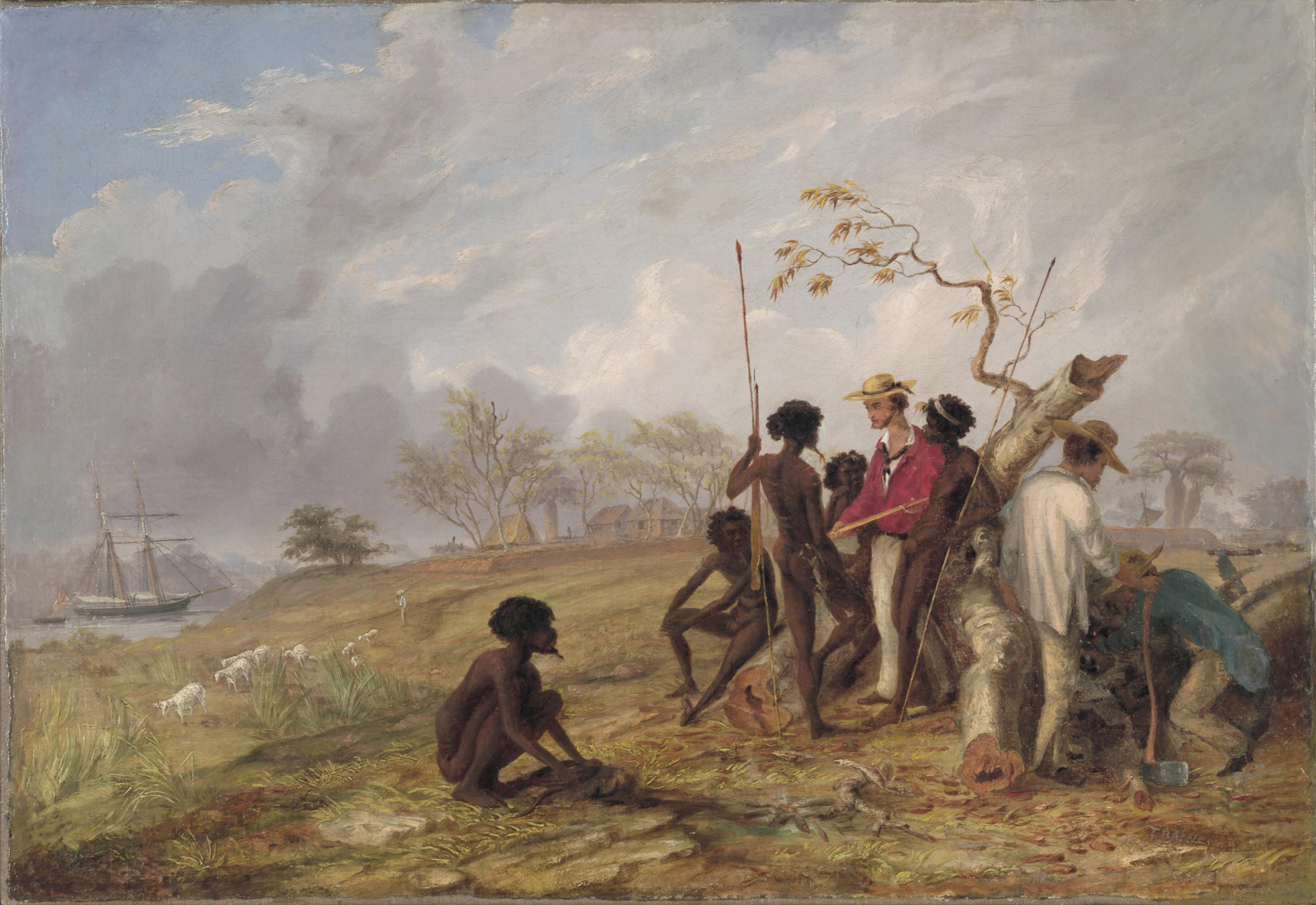
Thomas Baines with Aborigines near the mouth of the Victoria River

- Australia (Note: Also ethnoculturally grouped as Australasian with New Zealand, since both have large non-Indigenous populations from Europe and elsewhere.)
- Barrow Island, Western Australia (Note: Uninhabited when discovered by Europeans; believed to have once been inhabited by Indigenous Australians.)
- Bentinck Island, Queensland
- Buccaneer Archipelago
- Five Islands
- French Island, Victoria
- K'gari
- Kangaroo Island
- Lady Julia Percy Island
- Lizard Island
- Maria Island
- Montebello Islands
- Palm Island, Queensland
  - Great Palm Island
- Phillip Island
- Rottnest Island
- Sir Graham Moore Island (Also known as Niiwalarra)
- Tasmania
- Tiwi Islands
- Wellesley Islands
  - Mornington Island
- Wardang Island
- Whitsunday Islands

=== Melanesian ===
- Fiji
- Indonesia
  - Central Papua
  - Highland Papua
  - Papua
  - South Papua
  - Southwest Papua
  - West Papua
- New Caledonia
- Papua New Guinea
- Solomon Islands
- Torres Strait Islands
- Vanuatu

=== Micronesian ===
- Guam
- Federated States of Micronesia
- Marshall Islands
- Nauru
- Northern Mariana Islands
- Kiribati
- Palau

=== Polynesian ===
- American Samoa
- Anuta
- Auckland Islands (Note: Uninhabited when discovered by Europeans; believed to have once been inhabited by Polynesians.)
- Bellona Island
- Chatham Islands
- Cook Islands
- Easter Island
- Emae
- French Polynesia
  - Tahiti
- Hawaii
- Isla Salas y Gómez (Note: Believed to have been known about by Polynesians from Easter Island, but there is no evidence that it was ever inhabited.)
- Kermadec Islands (Note: Uninhabited when discovered by Europeans; believed to have been visited by Polynesians.)
- Manawatāwhi / Three Kings Islands
- Mele Island
- New Zealand (Note: Also ethnoculturally grouped as Australasian with Australia, since both have large non-Indigenous populations from Europe and elsewhere.)
- Niue
- Norfolk Island (Note: Uninhabited when discovered by Europeans; believed to have once been inhabited by Polynesians. The island is more commonly grouped with Melanesia, which it is geographically adjacent to, or Australasia, which it is politically a part of.)
- Nuguria
- Nukumanu Islands
- Nukuoro
- Ontong Java Atoll
- Pileni
- Pitcairn Islands
- Rennell Island
- Rotuma
- Samoa
- Sikaiana
- Snares Islands / Tini Heke (Note: Uninhabited when discovered by Europeans; believed to have been known about by Polynesians from New Zealand.)
- Takuu Atoll
- Tikopia
- Tokelau
- Tonga
- Tuvalu
- Wallis and Futuna

=== None (uninhabited or unused prior to European discovery) ===
- Antipodes Islands (Note: May have possibly been inhabited by Polynesians.)
- Ashmore and Cartier Islands
- Baker Island
- Bonin Islands (Note: May have possibly been inhabited by Micronesians.)
  - Volcano Islands
  - Minami-Tori-shima (Also known as Marcus Island)
- Bounty Islands
- Browse Island
- Campbell Island / Motu Ihupuku
- Christmas Island (Note: Australian external territory; often considered a part of Asia due to geographic proximity.)
- Clipperton Island
- Cocos (Keeling) Islands
- Coral Sea Islands
- Desventuradas Islands
- Galápagos Islands
- Heron Island, Queensland
- Howland Island (Note: May have possibly been inhabited by an Indigenous Oceanian group.)
- Jarvis Island
- Johnston Atoll
- Juan Fernández Islands
- Kingman Reef
- Lord Howe Island
- Macquarie Island
- Matthew Island and Hunter Island
- Midway Atoll
- Pelorus Islet
- Sir Joseph Banks Group
  - Boucaut Island
  - Dangerous Reef
  - English Island, South Australia
  - Langton Island
  - Sibsey Island
  - Spilsby Island
  - Stickney Island
- Solander Islands
- Wake Island (Note: May have possibly been visited by Micronesians.)

== See also ==
- Europeans in Oceania
- List of indigenous peoples of Oceania
- Malagasy people
- Pacific Islander
- Taiwanese indigenous peoples
