= Decolonisation of Oceania =

Independence of Oceanic countries from colonial rule

The decolonisation of Oceania occurred after World War II when nations in Oceania achieved independence by transitioning from European colonial rule to full independence.

While most of the countries of Oceania have a specific independence day, the independence of Australia and the independence of New Zealand were a gradual process and cannot be associated clearly with a specific date. Most of the British colonies in Australia gained responsible government in the 1850s, as did New Zealand in 1856. This was formalised into Dominion status in the 1900s, but with the United Kingdom retaining certain (disused) powers de jure. Although they were de facto sovereign states by the 1920s, Australia and New Zealand refused the formal recognition of their full sovereignty when offered through the Statute of Westminster in 1931, before accepting it respectively in 1942 and 1947.

Oceania continues to include a number of dependent territories controlled by colonial powers. The United Nations list of non-self-governing territories includes six Oceanian territories – the French dependencies of French Polynesia and New Caledonia, the American territories of American Samoa and Guam, the British dependency of Pitcairn Islands, and the New Zealand territory of Tokelau.

== Timeline ==
Timeline of decolonising Oceania
Country	Colonial name	Colonial power	Independence date	First head of state	Independence won through
New Zealand	Dominion of New Zealand	United Kingdom	20th century	–	gradual process
Australia	Australia	United Kingdom	20th century	–	gradual process
Indonesia	Dutch East Indies; Netherlands New Guinea	Netherlands	27 December 1949 (East Indies); 1 May 1963 (New Guinea)	Sukarno	Indonesian National Revolution
Samoa	Western Samoa Trust Territory	New Zealand	1 January 1961; 1 January 1962; 1 June 1990; 4 July 1997	Malietoa Tanumafili II and Tui Atua Tupua Tamasese Mea'ole	peaceful campaign by the Mau movement
Nauru	Nauru Trust Territory	Australia	30 January 1968; 31 January 1968	Hammer DeRoburt	peaceful campaign
Tonga	Kingdom of Tonga	United Kingdom	4 June 1970; 1971	Taufaʻahau Tupou IV	request
Fiji	Kingdom of Fiji Colony of Fiji	United Kingdom	5 June 1871 13 August 1877; 10 October 1970	Seru Epenisa CakobauiKingdom of FijiKamisese Mara (Prime Minister: head of gov.)	British initiative, and negotiation
Papua New Guinea	German New Guinea; Territory of New Guinea; Trust Territory of Papua and New Guinea	German Empire; United Kingdom; Australia	16 September 1975; 7 July 1978	Michael Somare (Prime Minister: head of gov.)	Australian initiative
Solomon Islands	British Solomon Islands	United Kingdom	16 September 1945; 7 July 1978	Peter Kenilorea (Prime Minister: head of gov.)	British initiative
Tuvalu	Gilbert and Ellice Islands	United Kingdom	1 January 1976 1 October 1978; 12 July 1979; 12 July 1980	Toaripi Lauti (Prime Minister: head of gov.)	British initiative
Kiribati	Gilbert and Ellice Islands	United StatesUnited Kingdom	1 January 1976 1 October 1978; 12 July 1979; 12 July 1980	Ieremia Tabai	British initiative
Vanuatu	(United Kingdom) (France) New Hebrides	United Kingdom; France	30 July 1980; 1 August 1980; 1990	George Kalkoa	peaceful campaign by the New Hebrides National Party
Marshall Islands	Trust Territory of the Pacific Islands	United States	2 September 1945 21 October 1986; 30 September 1991; 2007	Amata Kabua	–
Federated States of Micronesia	Trust Territory of the Pacific Islands	United States	2 September 1945 3 November 1986; 30 September 1991	Tosiwo Nakayama	–
Palau	Trust Territory of the Pacific Islands	United States	2 September 1945 25 May 1994; 30 September 1991; 1 October 1994; 1 October 1999; 25 May 2005	Kuniwo Nakamura	–
Cook Islands	Cook Islands	New Zealand	4 August 1965/1992/2008/2024	Albert Henry (Prime Minister: head of gov.) Geoffrey Henry (Prime Minister: head of gov.)	–
Niue	Niue	New Zealand	19 October 1974/1994/2008/2024	Robert Rex (Premier: head of gov.) Frank Lui (Premier: head of gov.)	–

== Stages of decolonisation ==
Country	Date of current form of government	Birth of current form of government	Date of acquisition of sovereignty	Acquisition of sovereignty	Date of territorial modification	Most recent significant territorial modification
Australia	1 January 1901	Commonwealth of Australia established as a federation.	1 January 1901	Federation of Australia – Formation of the Commonwealth of Australia by six separate British self-governing colonies	16 September 1975	Papua New Guinea becomes formally independent from Australia
Australia	1 January 1901	Commonwealth of Australia established as a federation.	9 October 1942	Statute of Westminster adopted – Britain loses the power to legislate for Australia except by request	16 September 1975	Papua New Guinea becomes formally independent from Australia
Australia	1 January 1901	Commonwealth of Australia established as a federation.	3 March 1986	Australia Act 1986 – Remaining legal ties between Britain and Australia are abolished, including the ability for the UK to legislate with effect in Australia	16 September 1975	Papua New Guinea becomes formally independent from Australia
Fiji			10 October 1970	Independence from the United Kingdom		
Kiribati			12 July 1979	Independence from the United Kingdom	1 October 1975	Separation of the Gilbert Islands (later Kiribati) and the Ellice Islands (later Tuvalu)
Marshall Islands	1 May 1979	Constitution and a local government established	21 October 1986	Compact of Free Association with the United States		
Federated States of Micronesia	10 May 1979	Constitution ratified	3 November 1986	Compact of Free Association with the United States	10 May 1979	Yap, Chuuk, Pohnpei, and Kosrae unite to form the Federated States of Micronesia
Nauru			31 January 1968	Independence from UN Trusteeship (Australian, British and New Zealand administration ends)		
New Zealand	6 February 1840	Treaty of Waitangi where the British Crown established a right to govern from indigenous Māori tribes	17 January 1853	Self-Government	1 June 1962	Samoa becomes fully independent from New Zealand. It is also the first small-island country in the Pacific to become independent.
New Zealand	6 February 1840	Treaty of Waitangi where the British Crown established a right to govern from indigenous Māori tribes	18 April 1856	Responsible Government	1 June 1962	Samoa becomes fully independent from New Zealand. It is also the first small-island country in the Pacific to become independent.
New Zealand	6 February 1840	Treaty of Waitangi where the British Crown established a right to govern from indigenous Māori tribes	26 September 1907	Granted nominal independence (Dominion status).	1 June 1962	Samoa becomes fully independent from New Zealand. It is also the first small-island country in the Pacific to become independent.
New Zealand	6 February 1840	Treaty of Waitangi where the British Crown established a right to govern from indigenous Māori tribes	25 October 1926	Balfour Declaration of 1926 — Great Britain and the Dominions are “autonomous Communities within the British Empire, equal in status, in no way subordinate one to another in any aspect of their domestic or external affairs”	1 June 1962	Samoa becomes fully independent from New Zealand. It is also the first small-island country in the Pacific to become independent.
New Zealand	6 February 1840	Treaty of Waitangi where the British Crown established a right to govern from indigenous Māori tribes	27 July 1938	Governor-General ceases to represent the British Government and becomes the personal representative of the King.	1 June 1962	Samoa becomes fully independent from New Zealand. It is also the first small-island country in the Pacific to become independent.
New Zealand	6 February 1840	Treaty of Waitangi where the British Crown established a right to govern from indigenous Māori tribes	25 November 1947	Statute of Westminster adopted — Britain loses the power to legislate for New Zealand except by request	1 June 1962	Samoa becomes fully independent from New Zealand. It is also the first small-island country in the Pacific to become independent.
New Zealand	6 February 1840	Treaty of Waitangi where the British Crown established a right to govern from indigenous Māori tribes	10 December 1947	Full power to amend own constitution	1 June 1962	Samoa becomes fully independent from New Zealand. It is also the first small-island country in the Pacific to become independent.
New Zealand	6 February 1840	Treaty of Waitangi where the British Crown established a right to govern from indigenous Māori tribes	1 December 1967	Governor-General becomes a New Zealand appointment	1 June 1962	Samoa becomes fully independent from New Zealand. It is also the first small-island country in the Pacific to become independent.
New Zealand	6 February 1840	Treaty of Waitangi where the British Crown established a right to govern from indigenous Māori tribes	1 January 1987	Commencement of the Constitution Act 1986 — Removed the ability of the British Parliament to pass laws for New Zealand with the consent of the New Zealand Parliament.	1 June 1962	Samoa becomes fully independent from New Zealand. It is also the first small-island country in the Pacific to become independent.
Palau	1 January 1981	Republic of Palau created upon the adoption of a constitution	1 October 1994	Emerged from United Nations trusteeship (administered by the United States).		
Papua New Guinea			1 December 1973	Self-governing territory		
Papua New Guinea			16 September 1975	Independence from Australia		
Samoa			1 June 1962	Independence from New Zealand		
Solomon Islands			2 January 1976	Self-government granted by the United Kingdom		
Solomon Islands			7 July 1978	Independence from the United Kingdom		
Tonga			4 July 1970	Independence from the United Kingdom	4 December 1845	Unification of what is now the islands of Tonga by George Tupou I of Tonga
Tuvalu	1 October 1975	Separation of Gilbert Islands (later Kiribati) and Ellice Islands (later Tuvalu)	1 October 1978	Independence from the United Kingdom	7 February 1979	Treaty with United States recognizing Tuvaluan control over Funafuti, Nukufetau, Nukulaelae, and Niulakita atolls
Vanuatu			30 July 1980	Independence from joint British-French condominium		

== Oceania ==
This is a list of all present sovereign states in Oceania and their predecessors. The region of Oceania is generally defined geographically to include the subregions of Australasia, Melanesia, Micronesia and Polynesia, and their respective sovereign states. Oceania was originally colonised by Europeans with Australia and New Zealand primarily by the British, and the Pacific Islands primarily by the British, French and Dutch. Today, Oceania consists of fourteen sovereign states of various government types, the most common consisting of parliamentary systems.

Sovereign state	Predecessors
Australia	British Colonial Period Colony of New South Wales (1788–1901) Van Diemen's Land Colony (1825–1856), later Colony of Tasmania (1856–1901) Colony of Western Australia (1829–1901) Province of South Australia (1836–1901) Victoria Colony (1851–1901) Colony of Queensland (1859–1901) Commonwealth of Australia (1901–present)
Fiji	Kingdom of Fiji (1871–1874); Colony of Fiji (1874–1970); Dominion of Fiji (1970–1987); Republic of Fiji (1987–present)
Kiribati	Gilbert and Ellice Islands Colony (1892–1975); Colony of Gilbert Islands (1975–1979); Independent and Sovereign Republic of Kiribati (1979–present)
Marshall Islands	German New Guinea (1884–1919); South Pacific Mandate (1919–1947); Trust Territory of the Pacific Islands (1947–1994) (Marshall Islands participation until 1979); Republic of the Marshall Islands (1979–present)
Federated States of Micronesia	Spanish East Indies (1565–1898); German New Guinea (1884–1919); South Pacific Mandate (1919–1947); Trust Territory of the Pacific Islands (1947–1994) (FSM participation until 1979); Federated States of Micronesia (1979–present)
Nauru	German New Guinea (1884–1919) (participation 1888–1914); Nauru (1914–1942) (League of Nations mandate 1932–1942); Japanese occupation of Nauru (1942–1945); Nauru (1945–1968) (UN Trust Territory 1947–1968); Republic of Nauru (1968–present)
New Zealand	Colony of New South Wales (1788–1901) (NZ participation 1788–1841); Colony of New Zealand (1841–1907); Dominion of New Zealand (1907–1947); New Zealand (1947–present)
Palau	Spanish East Indies (1565–1898); German New Guinea (1884–1919); South Pacific Mandate (1919–1947); Trust Territory of the Pacific Islands (1947–1994); Republic of Palau (1994–present)
Papua New Guinea	Territory of Papua (1884–1975) and German New Guinea (1884–1919), later Territory of New Guinea (1919–1975) (League of Nations mandate, later UN Trust Territory); Territory of Papua and New Guinea (1949–1975) (administrative union between Territory of Papua and Territory of New Guinea); Independent State of Papua New Guinea (1975–present)
Samoa	German Samoa (1900–1920); Western Samoa Trust Territory (1920–1962) (League of Nations mandate of Britain, later UN Trust Territory of New Zealand); Independent State of Western Samoa (1962–1997); Independent State of Samoa (1997–present)
Solomon Islands	German New Guinea (1884–1919) (Solomon Islands participation 1884–1893); British Solomon Islands (1893–1978); Solomon Islands (1978–present)
Tonga	Kingdom of Tonga (1845–present) (British protectorate 1900–1970)
Tuvalu	Gilbert and Ellice Islands Colony (1892–1975); Colony of Tuvalu (1975–1978); Tuvalu (1978–present)
Vanuatu	Anglo-French Joint Naval Commission (1887–1889); Independent Commune of Franceville (1889–1890) (unrecognised state); Anglo-French Joint Naval Commission (1890–1906); New Hebrides Condominium (1906–1980); Republic of Vanuatu (1980–present)

== See also ==
- Current United Nations list of non-self-governing territories
- Current list of dependent territories
- Colonialism
- Colonisation of Australia
- Colonisation of New Zealand
- Decolonisation
- Indigenous peoples of Oceania
- Wars of national liberation
