= Saint John the Baptist Catholic Church (Honolulu) =

Roman Catholic Church of Hawaii in the United States

Saint John the Baptist Church
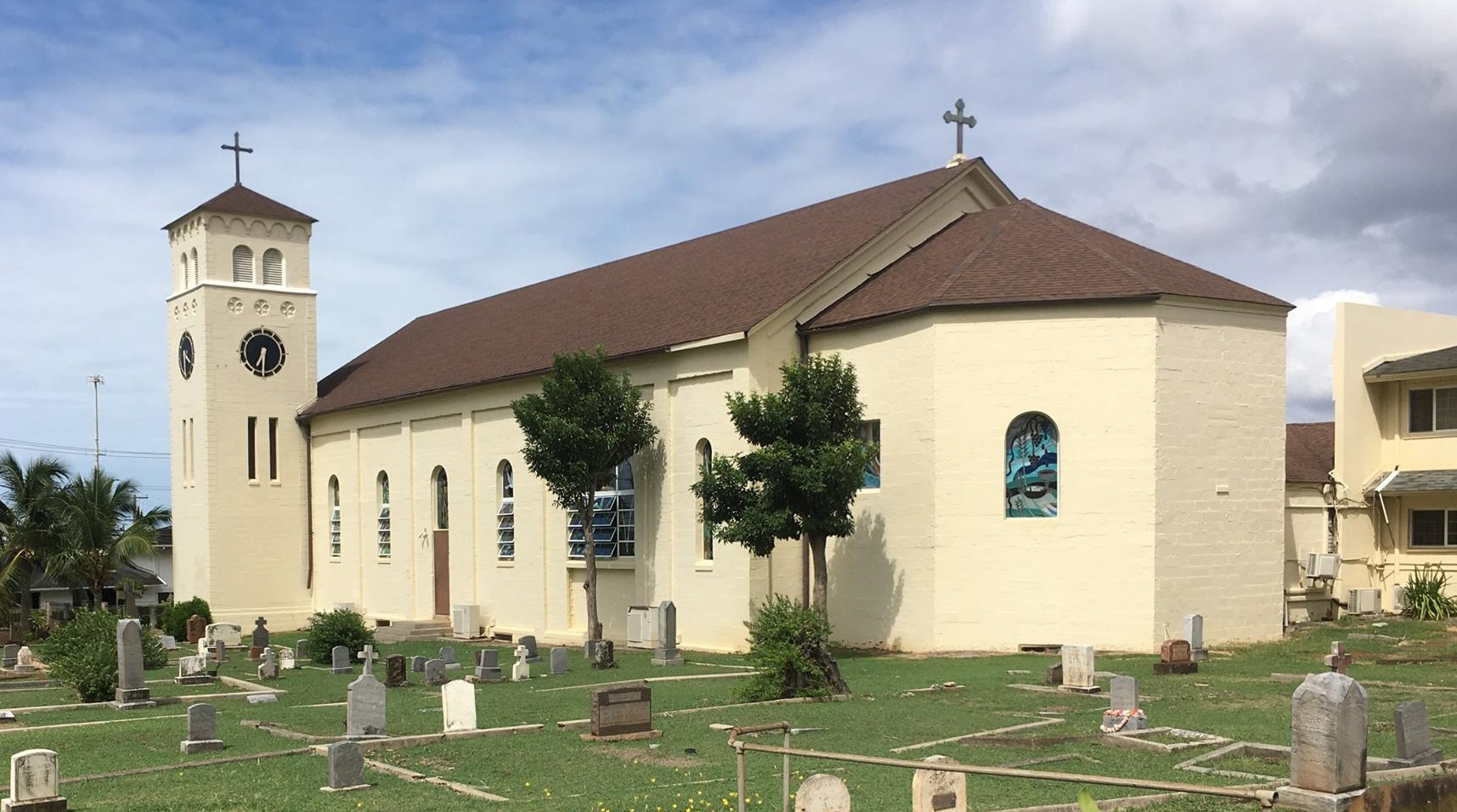
- Church and cemetery from the north
- Saint John the Baptist Church
- 21.3377°N 157.8810°W
- Address: 2324 Omilo Lane; Honolulu, HI 96819-2434
- Country: USA
- Denomination: Roman Catholic
- Website: sjbkalihi.org

History
- Status: Active
- Founded: May 8, 1844
- Founder: Congregation of the Sacred Hearts of Jesus and Mary

Architecture
- Style: Mediterranean Revival

Administration
- Diocese: Diocese of Honolulu

Saint John the Baptist Church is a parish church of the Roman Catholic Diocese of Honolulu in Hawaii, United States. It opened in 1844 and has existed in its current building since 1933. The church operated a school from 1959 to 2020.

== History ==
Saint John the Baptist Church was established on May 8, 1844, when it was dedicated by Bishop Louis Maigret. In 1846 the original building was destroyed in a windstorm, with a replacement church being opened in 1857. It say an additional expansion in 1899, with a new church building being opened and dedicated on September 17, 1899.

In the early 20th-century the church saw an additional phase of expansion, with the building being replaced with a new concrete one which opened on June 21, 1933. In 1955 the church was taken over by the Maryknoll Society, who established the St. John the Baptist School in 1959. The Sisters of the Most Holy Rosary of the Philippines took over the school in 1976 alongside the Sisters of St. Joseph of Carondelet.

The parish closed the school on June 30, 2020, with the parish citing the COVID-19 pandemic and an ongoing budget deficit as the primary reasons. In 2025 the parish was gifted a relic of Carlo Acutis.

== Today ==
Located in the historic Kalihi district across the street from Fort Shafter, the church once served the Native Hawaiian, Portuguese, and Spanish pineapple and sugarcane plantation laborers of the early 1900s. A demographic shift occurred in the 1950s with the introduction of Filipino immigrants. The current influx of new immigrants come from Samoa, Micronesia, and other Pacific Islands. A primary school was active between 1959 and 2020.

== Gallery ==
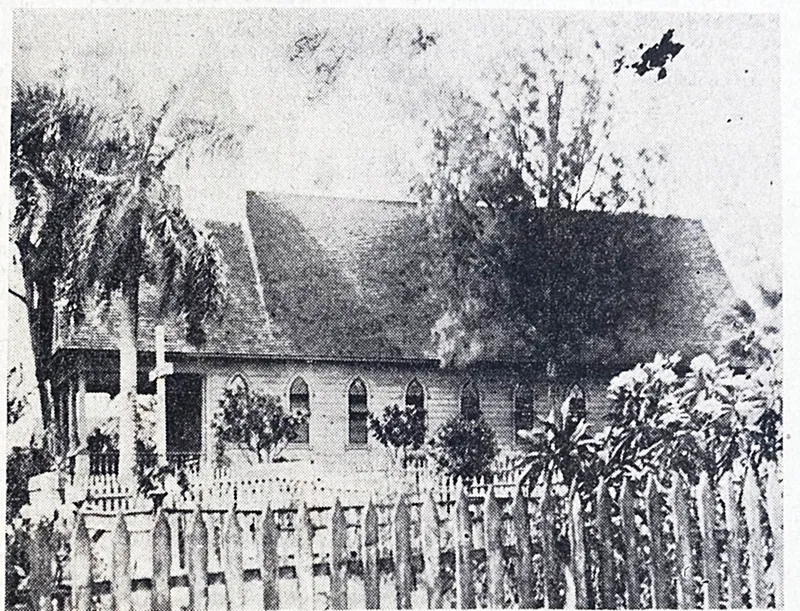
Second church building in 1899
