= English Island =

English Island may refer to:

- English Island, Isles of Scilly, an uninhabited rocklet in the Isles of Scilly in England
- English Island (South Australia), an island in the Sir Joseph Banks Group in Spencer Gulf in Australia
