= Reevesby Island =

Island in South Australia

- Interactive map of Reevesby Island

Geography
- Location: Spencer Gulf, South Australia
- Coordinates: 34°31′34″S 136°16′49″E
- Archipelago: Sir Joseph Banks group

Administration
- Australia
- State: South Australia

Demographics
- Population: Uninhabited

Location of Reevesby Island (South Australia)

Reevesby Island is a small, uninhabited island in the Sir Joseph Banks group of islands in southern Spencer Gulf, South Australia. The island is one of the largest in the Sir Joseph Banks Conservation Park and is home to many unique species including greater stick-nest rats, hooded plovers, little penguins and Cape Barren geese.

Since 2018, a group of volunteers now known as the Friends of Reevesby Island have been restoring the old homestead on the island, which was inhabited until it became a conservation park in 1974. Author and local historian Eric Kotz is a member. The homestead is encircled by a low fence which was built to keep the island's resident tiger snakes and death adders away from the island's human inhabitants.
