= Sibsey Island =

Island in South Australia

- Location within South Australia

Geography
- Location: Spencer Gulf
- Coordinates: 34°38′49″S 136°10′53″E
- Archipelago: Sir Joseph Banks Group
- Highest elevation: 26 m (85 ft)

Administration
- Australia
- South Australia

Demographics
- Population: 0

Sibsey Island is an island in the Australian state of South Australia located in Spencer Gulf within the Sir Joseph Banks Group. It was discovered on 21 February 1802 by Matthew Flinders. Currently, the island is uninhabited.

== Geography ==
Sibsey Island is the westernmost member of the Sir Joseph Banks group. There are two anchorages on the island, one on the western side of the island, and another on the east. The nearest island within the Sir Joseph Banks Group is English Island, which lies to the north-east. There is a navigational aid located on 2m high pile on the island's highest point, i.e. 26m above sea level. Dangerous Reef, a nearby reef, makes approaching the island in large craft hazardous.

== Wildlife ==
Australian sea lions from nearby English Island are often seen on the rocks near to Sibsey. Seabirds nest on the island, but there are no other large animals present. Marine predators often hunt in the channel between Sibsey and English Islands. The island is part of the Sir Joseph Banks Islands Important Bird Area, identified as such by BirdLife International because of its importance as a breeding site for seabirds and for Cape Barren geese. Guano was collected from the island in the early 20th century. One party to the island c. 1916 left two members on the island for twelve days, during which time they survived by eating little penguins and their eggs. In 2004, "few" little penguins were present on Sibsey Island. As of 2011, the colony's status is unknown.

== Economy ==
The island has no native economy, being uninhabited. However, the waters surrounding it are used extensively by recreational fishermen. The nearby Dangerous Reef is also a popular tourism spot, with scuba diving operators taking advantage of the natural formations and fish stocks. It is a significant bird, sea lion and great white shark breeding area. The area is also covered under the Lower Eyre Peninsula Aquaculture Policy.

== Protected area status ==
Sibsey Island first obtained protected area status as a fauna conservation reserve declared under the Crown Lands Act 1929-1966 on 16 March 1967.

== See also ==
- List of islands of Australia
- Sir Joseph Banks Group Important Bird Area
