= Sir Joseph Banks Group Conservation Park =

Protected area in South Australia

- IUCN category Ia (strict nature reserve)
- Location within South Australia
- Location: South Australia
- Nearest city: Port Lincoln
- Coordinates: 34°34′59″S 136°16′26″E
- Area: 476.90 km^{2} (184.13 sq mi)
- Established: 1972
- Governing body: Department for Environment and Water
- Website: Official website

Sir Joseph Banks Group Conservation Park is a protected area in the Australian state of South Australia located on the Sir Joseph Banks Group in Spencer Gulf about 25 kilometres (16 mi) east-northeast of Port Lincoln. The conservation park of which specific islands had been previously declared as Flora and Fauna Reserves under statutes in force prior to 1972, was proclaimed in 1972 under the National Parks and Wildlife Act 1972. It was declared ‘primarily for the conservation of Cape Barren geese (which had suffered severe population declines during the middle of 20th century, from hunting), and to protect marine mammal habitat’. As of 1996, the conservation park did not include Spilsby island which is privately owned and ‘lighthouse reserves’ on other islands while the following islands have been added post-declaration - Reevesby Island which was added in 1974 and Dangerous Reef which was added in 1989. The conservation park was subsequently extended to include the waters within 2 nautical miles (4 km) of the shoreline of all islands in the group and Dangerous Reef via a declaration under the National Parks and Wildlife Act 1972 for the purpose of regulating and managing great white shark berleying activities. The conservation park is classified as an IUCN Category Ia protected area.
