= Boucaut Island =

Island in South Australia

Coordinates: 34°38′49″S 136°22′04″E

Boucaut Island is a small, uninhabited island in the Sir Joseph Banks Group in South Australia's Spencer Gulf. It lies 1.2 km northeast of Spilsby Island. Seal Rock lies 250 metres southeast of Boucaut Island.

== History ==
In 1902, the island was leased to Henry Mortlock Scruby and W. E. Scruby for grazing and cultivation. At that time, the Scruby family also leased the much larger Spilsby Island. In the early 20th century, fishermen caught sweep and snapper in adjacent waters.
