= Stickney Island =

Island in South Australia

Coordinates: 34°40′41″S 136°16′14″E

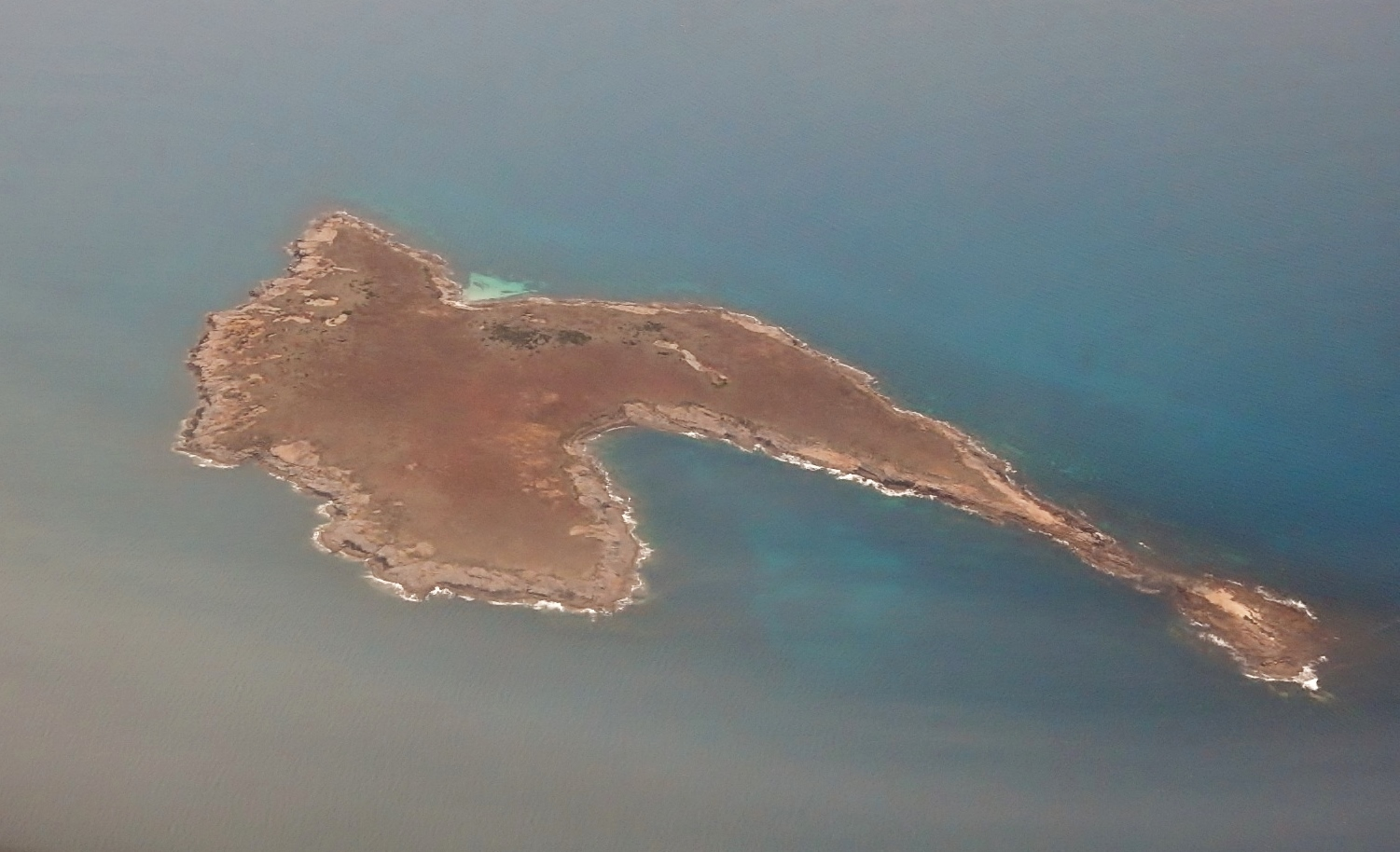
Hammerhead Shark Island (Stickney)

Stickney Island is an uninhabited island of the Sir Joseph Banks Group located in Spencer Gulf, South Australia.

== History ==
The island was named after Stickney, Lincolnshire (UK). It was named by Captain Matthew Flinders Captain John Franklin during their explorations of the South Australian coast in HMS Investigator.

In the 1800s, Stickney Island was visited by shooters and fishers. In 1885, a lease was offered for grazing and cultivation purposes on Stickney Island. The lease was taken up by J. Sawyer. In 1906, Stickney Island was leased by R. Sawyer, who also leased Roxby Island.

The shipwrecked crew of the cutter Jessie was found there in September 1903, having survived on a diet of fish alone. Their vessel had been inundated during rough seas and sank while the crew was ashore.

In 1939, Zane Grey caught a Great white shark in the waters surrounding Stickney and Spilsby Islands. In the 1930s, fishermen caught sweep and whiting in the waters off Stickney Island.
