= Samoans in Hawaii =

Total population
- 37,453 (2-3%)

Regions with significant populations
- Honolulu County: 33,272
- Hawaii County: 2,253
- Maui County: 1,486
- Kauaʻi County: 452

Languages
- English, Hawaiian Pidgin, Samoan

Religion
- Christianity

Related ethnic groups
- Other Polynesians and Pacific Islanders

Samoans in Hawaii are Hawaii residents of Samoan descent. Samoans in Hawaii may be from or have ancestors in the independent nation of Samoa, the territory of American Samoa, or both.

== History ==
Due to the Immigration and Nationality Act of 1952, many American Samoans migrated to the rest of the United States. Many of them settled in Hawaii.

Samoans from the independent part of Samoa also migrated to Hawaii later on.

== Demographics ==
In 2010, 37,463 Hawaii residents (or 2-3% of the population) claimed Samoan ancestry, with 19,176 of them being mixed ethnicity. The vast majority of them live in Honolulu County (Oahu).

== Notable Hawaii Residents of Samoan descent ==
- Tulsi Gabbard, former member of the U.S. House of Representatives
- Mike Gabbard, member of the Hawaii Senate
- Cedric Gates, member of the Hawaii House of Representatives
- Konishiki Yasokichi, former sumo wrestler
- Musashimaru Kōyō, former yokozuna
- Isiah Kiner-Falefa, professional baseball player
