= Sir Joseph Banks Group =

Archipelago in South Australia

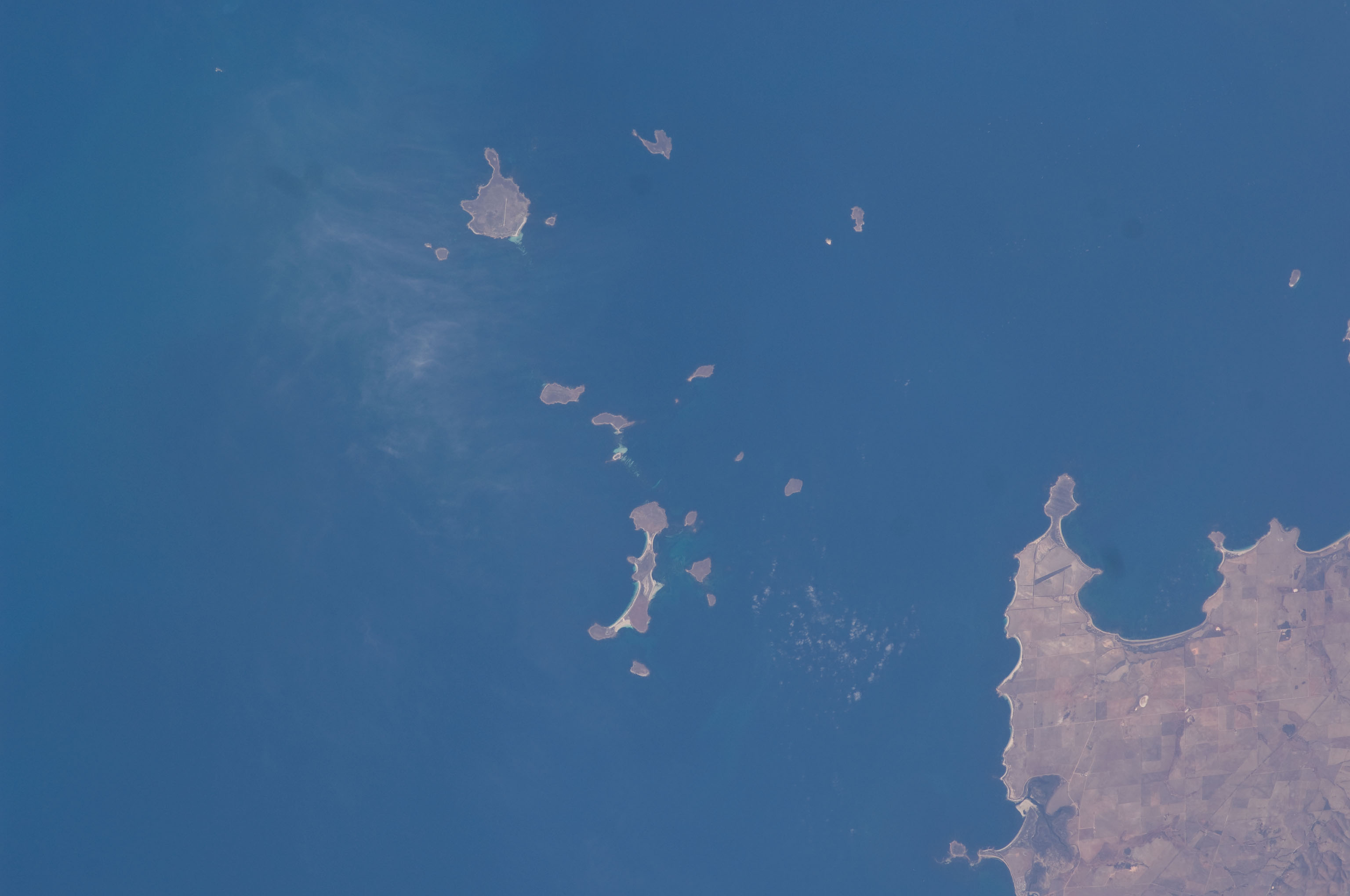
- Satellite image of Sir Joseph Banks Group (south at the top)

- Location within South Australia

Geography
- Location: Spencer Gulf
- Coordinates: 34°35′38″S 136°17′57″E
- Total islands: 21
- Major islands: Dangerous Reef, Reevesby Island, Spilsby Island

Administration
- Australia

The Sir Joseph Banks Group is an archipelago in the Australian state of South Australia located in Spencer Gulf about 20 kilometres (12 mi) off the eastern coast of the Eyre Peninsula. It consists of 21 islands of which eighteen are in the Sir Joseph Banks Group Conservation Park while the surrounding waters are in the Sir Joseph Banks Group Marine Park. It is considered to be an important seabird breeding site.

== Description ==
The islands are low-lying, with the highest point on Spilsby of about 50 metres (160 feet) They consist mainly of a granite base beneath limestone and are usually capped with calcrete or sandy soil. Reevesby and Spilsby are the largest islands in the group. Spilsby Island is privately owned and continues to be grazed by sheep, as well as holding a few holiday cottages.

=== Islands ===
The group consists of the following islands:

- Blyth Island
- Boucaut Island
- Buffalo Reef
- Dalby Island
- Dangerous Reef
- Duffield Island
- English Island
- Hareby Island
- Kirkby Island
- Langton Island
- Lusby Island
- Marum Island
- Partney Island
- Reevesby Island
- Roxby Island
- Seal Rock
- Sibsey Island
- Spilsby Island
- Stickney Island
- Smith Rock
- Winceby Island

One of the islands was known by the alternative name, Milne Island, in the 19th century.

=== Access ===
Visits to the islands are only possible by boat, with the closest mainland access point being the coastal town of Tumby Bay, 22 kilometres (14 miles) to the north-west. Some islands are not open to the general public because of their environmental sensitivity.

== History ==
There is no evidence to indicate usage by Indigenous Australians in prehistoric times. It is unknown if anyone ever set foot on the islands prior to the first confirmed European discovery in 1802. The islands were named by Matthew Flinders on 23 February 1802 on his voyage of exploration in HMS Investigator. The group is named after Sir Joseph Banks, who was a sponsor of the Investigator voyage. Many islands in the group are named after places in Flinders and Banks' home county of Lincolnshire, England. The name of Reevesby Island allegedly honours Banks' country residence, Revesby Abbey, though the spelling is inconsistent. Kirkby Island is named after the then president of the Royal Society. The nearest major population centre to the islands is Port Lincoln, the name of which also refers to Flinders and Banks' Lincolnshire connection.

Some of the group's islands were grazed in the 1800s, including Spilsby Island, where a man called J. Sawyer, his wife and children lived with about 800 sheep. In 1869, leases on islands in the group were offered for a seven year term. Sawyer held leases on multiple islands from 1871 until 1884. The lease was later held by the Scruby family, who also leased Stickney Island. In 1885, leases were offered on Langton, Spilsby, Sibsey and Stickney islands. Sawyer secured the leases on Langton and Stickney islands, while Spilsby Island was let to two men: Bishop and Wetherstone, and Sibsey Island was let to C. A. Oldham.

In the early 20th century, guano was quarried at Marum Island by the Spencer Gulf Fertilizer Company. The company also quarried guano from the Bicker Isles in Boston Bay.

Two-way radio communications with Reevesby Island were made possible in 1941. At this time, Reevesby Island was owned by Mr C. Darling and its administration was left to Mrs. R. Adams.

In 1949, Reevesby Island and several other islands in the Sir Joseph Banks Group were listed for private sale. The lot represented 2,000 acres of property in total, spread over the group.

Blyth Island, Boucaut Island, Duffield Island, English Island and Sibsey Island obtained protected area status as fauna conservation reserves declared under the Crown Lands Act 1929-1966 on 16 March 1967.

== Shipwrecks and groundings ==
In 1847, the Governor Gawler was shipwrecked at the group after striking a submerged rock. The crew made it to Reevesby Island, and items of value were salvaged from the vessel before it sank. She lies south-southwest of Hareby Island.

In 1891, the iron-hulled ship Theophane ran aground on one of the islands. All twenty-six people aboard were saved. The ship had departed from Port Pirie and was bound for Newcastle. Theophane was towed to Port Lincoln several days later with a piece of rock stuck in her hull.

The fishing cutter Edith was wrecked near Spilsby Island in 1897. There were no deaths. She lies off Spilsby Island's south-western shore.

In 1899, a vessel ran aground or was wrecked on Buffalo Reef.

In September 1903, the fishing cutter Jessica was wrecked and its crew found a week later on Stickney Island. They had survived on fish and no other provisions.

In 1920 the ketch Ina was stranded at Sibsey Island.

The ketch Eleanor ran aground on reef near Kirkby Island in 1930 and was abandoned there. It was carrying a cargo of wheat from Port Neill enroute for Port Lincoln at the time.

== Flora and fauna ==
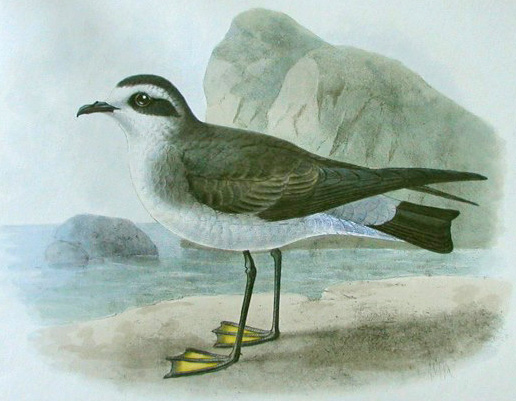
The group is an important breeding site for white-faced storm petrels…

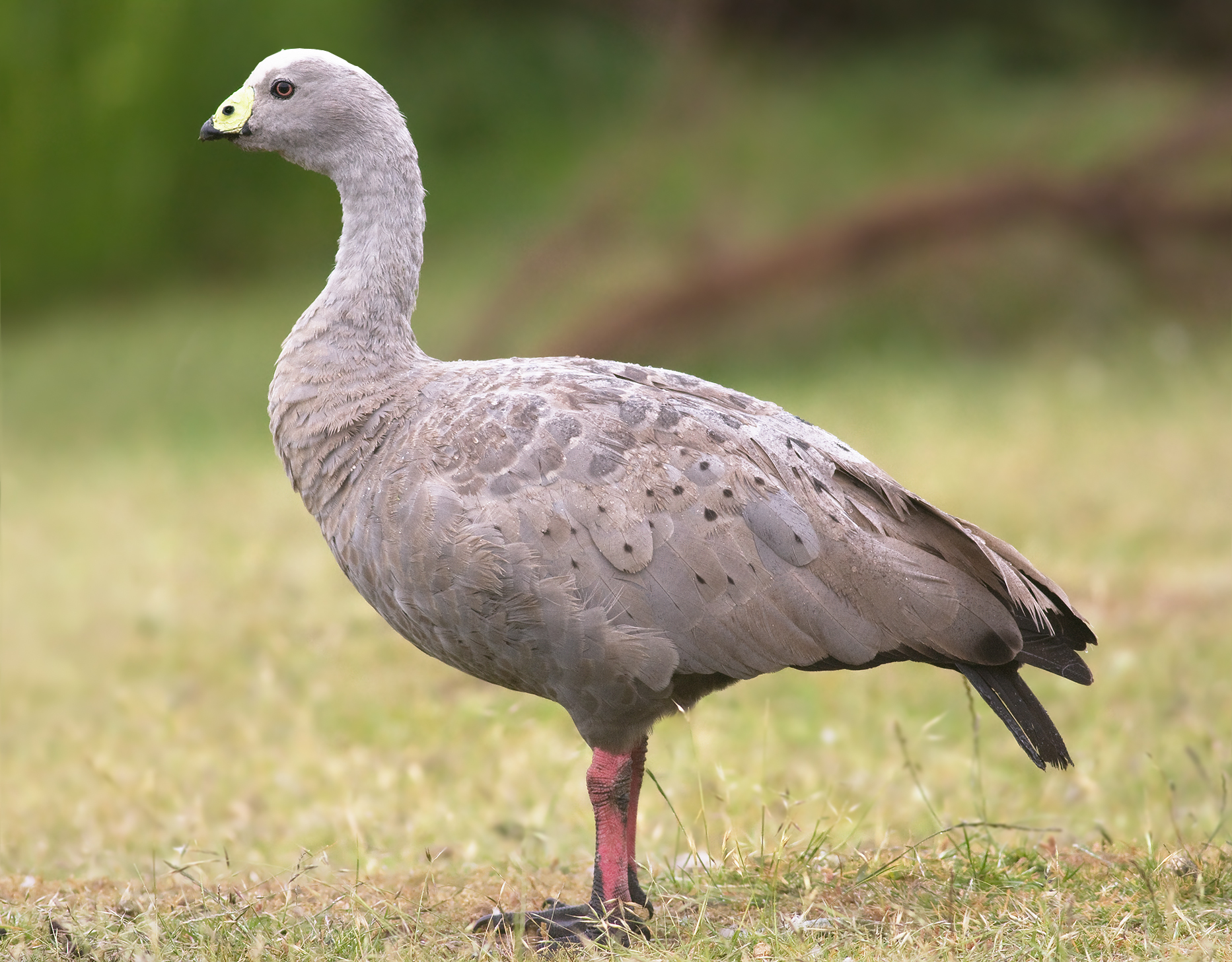
…and Cape Barren geese.

Most islands are vegetated with low shrubland dominated by nitre bush or African boxthorn. Some support tall shrubland dominated by coastal boobialla or coastal daisybush. Areas of sandy loam may support marsh saltbush. The larger islands retain patches of woodland. Islands previously used for grazing sheep have introduced grasses and burr medick.

As well as the native death adders, tiger snakes, and several species of lizard including goannas, many of the islands have introduced mammals such as feral cats, house mice or chinchilla rabbits. The archipelago has Australian sea lion breeding colonies. Greater stick-nest rats were reintroduced to Reevesby Island in 1990/91, and black tiger snakes were abundant there in 1937. Chinchilla rabbits were introduced to Spilsby Island as a business venture which failed and was then abandoned.

A 1940 account of wildlife of the island group states:

"There are... many penguins, quail, fairy-terns and other sea-birds on the islands. Cape Barren geese breed there in great numbers and the majority of Cape Barren geese in the Adelaide Zoo came from these islands. Along the beaches I found many beautiful shells, some no bigger than a threepenny bit, and others as large as a small dinner plate, and many varieties of seaweed spread over the seafloor."

During a 1941 demonstration of the two-way radio system which allowed conversations between Reevesby Island and the mainland for the first time, resident Mrs R. Adams described hundreds of Cape Barren geese nesting on the island, swimming with a seal and said that there was a large penguin burrow under a windmill. She also recounted an occasion when saw a group of five whales at once from the island.

In 1926, Spilsby Island supported thousands of terns and "numbers of" little penguins. The observers noted the southern end of Reevesby Island was a roost for mutton-birds and rock parrots.

In 1926, English Island was described as "teeming" with seals and thousands of breeding cormorants. Each nest contained one, two or three pale greenish eggs. Australian sealions were present at Kirby Island as observed by Matthew Flinders in 1802 and by others at English Island in 1935, 1937. and 1940.

In 1937, the McCoy Society made an expedition to the Sir Joseph Banks group, collecting specimens, taking photographs and making film recordings. A large colony of terns was discovered on Kirkby Island and a "huge colony" of fairy terns on Langton Island. The Kirby Island observation was of a "very numerous colony" of the Caspian tern. Motion-picture film recordings of the tern colony were made.

=== Little penguin colonies ===
Penguins were noted by Robert Cock on a visit to the islands in 1839. He noted "plenty" of little penguin, Cape Barren geese and other birds.

A holiday-maker visiting the Sir Joseph Banks group in 1923 noted the presence of little penguins, commenting that "On every island there are hundreds of nests, or rather roosts, of the fairy penguins, with their meek faces poking up under the barest shelter." Little penguins were also observed by field naturalists of the McCoy Society who visited the islands in 1936. In 1939 an observer noted that the penguins were not as numerous in the Banks Group as they were on some islands outside of Spencer Gulf.

Coarse mapping of breeding sites of Little penguins occurred during a 1996 survey of South Australia's offshore islands. It suggested that sites were widely distributed around the Group, potentially occurring on all islands.

As of 2011, several penguin colonies in the group are believed to be in decline.

==== Spilsby Island ====
As of June 2011, the colony of little penguins on Spilsby Island is believed to be in decline. "Numbers of" little penguins were present on the island in 1926. In 1935, the population was described by a visitor: "All around the shores of Spilsby the quaint, pretty little fairy penguins have their burrows. Sitting bolt upright, their short, hair-like plumage dark blue, with white fronts, they look at human beings with eyes which hold no fear, only a mild wonder at the appearance of the intruder. You can walk among them: they do not move, except to follow you with their eyes." In 2006, the Spilsby Island population was estimated at 2000-3000 birds. In 2010 the population was estimated to be less than 100 birds. In 2011, the population was described as "few". Landholders and conservation groups report that numbers in Spencer Gulf have crashed since the early 2000s.

==== Reevesby Island ====
Little penguins have been recorded on Reevesby Island. In 1907, the colony was mentioned by Douglas Mawson from the Australasian Association for the Advancement of Science: "The cavities in the limestone, which have been hollowed out by the sea, were found to contain a very large number of penguins." A little penguin burrow had been dug under a windmill on Reevesby Island in 1941. In 2009 the population was estimated to be 1,857 breeding birds. The colony is believed to be in decline, based on unpublished data and declining results of pitfall trap surveys.

==== Sibsey Island ====
In 1916, three men became marooned on Sibsey Island. They survived for twelve days on a diet of penguins and penguin eggs. In 2004, there were "few" penguins recorded on Sibsey Island.

== Protected area status ==
=== Statutory reserves ===
Eighteen of the islands within the group are in the Sir Joseph Banks Group Conservation Park with the waters surrounding the islands are protected by the Sir Joseph Banks Group Marine Park.

=== Non-statutory arrangements ===
==== Important Bird Area ====
The archipelago has been identified by BirdLife International as an Important Bird Area (IBA) known as the Sir Joseph Banks Group Important Bird Area because it supports over 1% of the world populations of white-faced storm petrels (with up to about 180,000 breeding pairs), Cape Barren geese (up to about 1200 individuals), black-faced cormorants (from 3000 to 5000 breeding pairs), and, probably, of Pacific gulls. Other seabirds which breed in the archipelago include little penguins, silver gulls and greater crested terns. Fairy terns, eastern reef egrets, rock parrots and muttonbirds have also been recorded.

== See also ==
- List of archipelagos
- List of little penguin colonies
