= Colonisation of Oceania =

Colonisation of the lands in the Pacific Ocean

The colonisation of Oceania includes:

- Colonisation of Australia
- Colonisation of New Zealand
- Colonisation of the Pacific islands

== See also ==
- Europeans in Oceania
- Indigenous peoples of Oceania
- Peopling of Oceania
