= Langton Island =

Island in South Australia

Coordinates: 34°35′43″S 136°15′10″E

Langton Island is a small, uninhabited island of the Sir Joseph Banks Group in Spencer Gulf, South Australia. The Island was named by Captain Matthew Flinders during his exploration of South Australia's coastline in 1802. Langton Island was named after Langton Hall in Lincolnshire. A "huge" breeding colony of fairy terns was found on Langton Island by naturalists from the McCoy Society in 1937. Fishermen have caught whiting in nearby waters.
