= Micronesians in Hawaii =

Total population
- 15,000 (1%)

Languages
- English, Pidgin, Chuukese, Palauan, Marshallese, Yapese, Ulithian

Religion
- Christianity

Related ethnic groups
- Austronesians

Micronesians in Hawaii are Hawaii residents whose ancestry comes from Micronesia, a subregion of Oceania. There are an estimated 15,000 Micronesians in Hawaii, comprising 1% of the total population.

== History ==
In 1986, the United States established the Compact of Free Association with three countries in Micronesia: the Federated States of Micronesia, Palau and the Marshall Islands. As a result of COFA provisions, people from these three countries were allowed to live and work permanently in the United States. Due to Micronesia's poorer healthcare quality, many Micronesians migrated to America to receive greater medical benefits. Hawaii received a large portion of these migrants, causing the formation of a large Micronesian community in Hawaii.

== Discrimination ==
In Hawaii, Micronesians are one of the most discriminated groups, largely due to stereotypes about their lower economic status and heavier reliance on welfare. Charles Rudolph Paul, the former Marshallese ambassador to the United States, expressed concern about the levels of racism Micronesians face in Hawaii.
