= Dangerous Reef =

Australian island and reef system

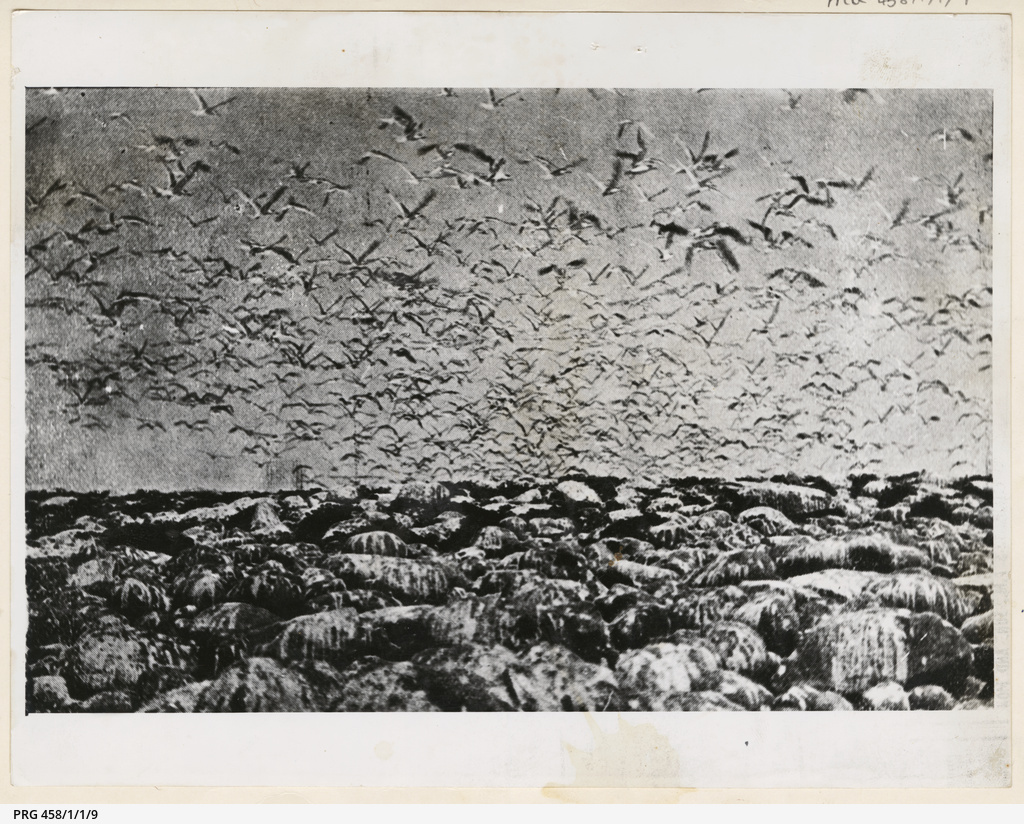
- Dangerous Reef, near Pt. Lincoln, a bird colony and seal habitat. Circa 1932. (State Library of South Australia PRG PRG-458-1-1-9)

- Location within South Australia

Geography
- Coordinates: 34°49′03″S 136°13′03″E
- Archipelago: Sir Joseph Banks Group
- Adjacent to: Spencer Gulf
- Area: 12 ha (30 acres)
- Highest elevation: 3 m (10 ft)

Administration
- Australia

Demographics
- Population: 0

Dangerous Reef is an island and reef system located in the Spencer Gulf in the Australian state of South Australia about 32.5 kilometres (20.2 mi) east-southeast of the city, Port Lincoln. It is the southernmost member of the Sir Joseph Banks Group. It has been the site of a navigation aid since 1911. It is notable as the site of a breeding colony of Australian sea lions. The waters adjoining its shore are notable as a place to view great white sharks to the extent that it was both a popular gamefishing and shark cage diving venue during the twentieth century, and was used to film footage for Blue Water White Death and Jaws. The island has enjoyed protected area status since 1900 and it has been part of the Sir Joseph Banks Group Conservation Park since 1989.

== Description ==
Dangerous Reef is located in Spencer Gulf about 32.5 kilometres (20.2 mi) east-south east of the city of Port Lincoln, about 17 kilometres (9 nmi) north-northeast of Observatory Point on the northeast coast of Thistle Island and is about 17.5 kilometres (10.9 mi) east of the nearest point of the mainland on the Eyre Peninsula. Officially, it is described in one source as being a "reef." In another official source, it is considered to be an island as it is listed as being part of the island group known as the Sir Joseph Banks Group despite being located about 15.5 kilometres (9.6 mi) south-southwest of Stickney Island, the nearest group member. Dangerous Reef itself is described as consisting of "a chain of four large rocks" with the tallest reaching a height of 3 metres (9.8 ft) with the remainder being "barely dry" at low tide as well as some other "small rocks." At high tide, the island/reef system has an area of dry land covering about 12 hectares (30 acres) while at low tide, the system dries to an area of about 40 hectares (100 acres). Access to the island/reef system which is subject to permission by the responsible government agency due to the island group's protected area status (refer below) is either via boat or helicopter.

== Formation, geology and oceanography ==
Dangerous Reef was formed about 8400 years ago following the rise of sea levels at the start of the Holocene. The island/reef system consists of an "isolated inselberg ridge" formed of "much eroded peneplained granite or granite gneiss belonging to the Lincoln Complex of granitic rocks intruded during the Kimban Orogeny, 1600 to 1800 Ma." As of 1982, it was reported that the island/reef system has no soil apart from that derived as the "broken down by-product of sea-lion and seabird excrement". The island/reef system extends from the "largest rock" for a distance of 1.39 kilometres (0.75 nmi) to the west and for a distance of 4.6 kilometres (2.5 nmi) to the south-east. The south-eastern end of the reef system is reported as experiencing waves that "break heavily." Water depths greater than 18.3 metres (60 ft) are reported within 4.6 kilometres (2.5 nmi) of the reef system.

== Flora and fauna ==
=== Flora ===
As of 1982, only the "largest rock" was vegetated and this consisted of two plant species, Mueller's Saltbush and Leafy Peppercress.

=== Fauna ===
Australian sea lions were seen in "immense numbers" by sailors on the yacht Wanderer, which passed by Dangerous Reef in May 1885. They described seeing "some of them real old man sea lions, as they lay on the rocks moving their heads from side to side, strongly reminding one of the slow ponderous movements of bears."

Australian sea lions (referred to as "hair seals" at the time) were abundant at Dangerous Reef in 1904. Photographs from the 1907 show Australian sealions and cormorants inhabiting the reef and are supported by written accounts. An account from 1910 referred to two to three hundred Australian sea lions seen "on an island near Dangerous Reef". The island in question is likely to have been a part of the greater Dangerous Reef complex or one of the islands of the Sir Joseph Banks Group. The sea lions were well known residents of the reef in 1912 with "hundreds" observed there that year.

Early 20th century descriptions note cormorants and terns there as "prolific", and detail gulls preying on unattended cormorant eggs, while the eggs of terns appeared untouched. Also noted were the presence of Greater crested terns, Little terns and Pacific gulls. In 1913, the island was known to support a breeding colony of cormorants.

In the 1930s, the reef was reported to host "plentiful" birds and seals, and photographs show the presence of Australian sealions, which were reportedly abundant there. A written account of a landing party there noted the dominance of Australian sealions and relatively few Long-nosed fur seals. It said of the sealions:

"Huge old bulls had their harems and offspring grouped around them, while all the young bulls kept at a respectful distance. The air was full of the sound of their coughing barks."

In the 1950s, Dangerous Reef was a popular destination for shark fishermen to catch Great white sharks.

Underwater photographer and conservationist Valerie Taylor and her filmmaker husband Ron Taylor made several visits to Dangerous Reef. She observed a decline between visits in the 1960s and 1970s from two-hundred or more Australian sealions down to roughly two dozen. She also observed changes in their behavior from relaxed on her first visit to fearful on her second.

In 1982, Dangerous Reef was known to support breeding colonies of black-faced cormorant, silver gull and Pacific gull.

In 1994, the breeding colony of Australian sea lions on the "largest rock" was reported as being the second largest colony for this species of pinniped.

== History ==
=== European use ===
==== Discovery ====
Dangerous Reef was discovered and named by the British navigator, Matthew Flinders, on 19 March 1802. While the name of the reef is attributed to Flinders in official sources, it has been suggested by Ernest Scott, the historian and the author of book, The Life of Captain Matthew Flinders R.N., that Dangerous Reef is an example of a feature for which Flinders wrote a descriptive remark about on his charts, i.e. to identify it as a navigation hazard. The descriptive remark for this and other features have been retained and subsequently used as the name of the features on charts and maps.

==== Capturing animals ====
Attempts were made in the late 1800s to capture animals from Dangerous Reef for zoological displays. Captured animals included seal pups and terns. In May 1871, three Australian sea lions were captured alive and transported to Glenelg on The Stormy Petrel. They were then advertised and displayed publicly on Rundle Street in Adelaide. Two of the captive animals were females.

==== Guano mining ====
Dangerous Reef is one of the island sites from which guano was mined under licence from the South Australian Government prior to 1919. The activity was controversial for the disturbance that it caused to roosting and breeding seabirds.

==== Navigation aids ====
A navigation aid has been in place on the "largest rock" since 1911.

==== Great white sharks ====
The waters adjoining Dangerous Reef are notable as a place of aggregation for great white sharks. It was a popular site for gamefishing from early in the 20th century until 1997 when the great white shark became a protected species in Australia. Dolphins were sometimes used as bait, as were Australian sea lions and horse meat. A whole seal was found in the stomach of one shark, caught in 1907. Notable gamefishers who visited the waters around Dangerous Reef included the American novelist, Zane Grey, in 1939 and the Australian radio personality, Jack Davey, in 1952.

In 1969, the island/reef system was one of the sites used for filming of the great white shark documentary, Blue Water White Death. In 1974, footage of live sharks used in the 1975 American film, Jaws was filmed at Dangerous Reef by Ron Taylor. Great White of Dangerous Reef, hosted by game-fisherman Malcolm Florence was filmed there in the late 1980s. In the film, sharks are fed from the safety of a shark cage before a shark is caught on a line. From the 1970s up until 2002, Dangerous Reef was one of the sites where tourists could try shark cage diving and observe sharks from within the water. In more recent years, shark cage diving for tourists has been offered near the Neptune Islands instead, with tours departing from Port Lincoln.

== Protected area status ==
Dangerous Reef first received protected area status on 29 April 1909 as a bird protection district declared under the Birds Protection Act 1900. It was further publicized as a sanctuary in 1933, noting that seals there were also protected. Since 1989, it has been part of the Sir Joseph Banks Group Conservation Park including the waters within 2 kilometres (1.2 mi) of the island group's shoreline for the purpose of managing shark cage diving activity. Since 2012, the waters adjoining the island group have also been part of a sanctuary zone within the Sir Joseph Banks Group Marine Park.

== See also ==
- List of islands of Australia
