= English Island (South Australia) =

Island in South Australia

Coordinates: 34°38′S 136°12′E

Geography
- Archipelago: Sir Joseph Banks Group
- Adjacent to: Spencer Gulf

Administration
- Australia

English Island is an island off the coast of Eyre Peninsula in South Australia. It is a part of the Sir Joseph Banks Group and close to Sibsey Island. The island is most notable for its large colony of sea lions, and for a secession movement started by the eccentric and self-styled "Sir Ralph Styles of English Island" in 1954.

== Flora and fauna ==
The island is part of the Sir Joseph Banks Group Important Bird Area, identified as such by BirdLife International because of its importance as a breeding site for seabirds and for Cape Barren geese. It first obtained protected area status as a fauna conservation reserve declared under the Crown Lands Act 1929-1966 on 16 March 1967.

In 1926, English Island was described as "teeming" with seals and thousands of breeding cormorants. Each nest contained one, two or three pale greenish eggs.

In 1935, the island was described as "flat, low, and literally smothered in shags... The birds stood in rank beyond rank on the rock— thousands of them... From the rocks, seals dived into the sea and came playing around the cutter, lifting dog-like heads to stare at us."

An account of the breeding sea lions (sometimes referred to as hair seals) of English Island was given in 1940:

"The first island, about ten acres in area, is inhabited by scores of seals, some no bigger than a doll and others grow to a height of about nine feet and which are the size of a full grown bullock. These are very curious and will follow a boat for long distances. When we were in the dinghy in about ten feet of water we could see them sitting on the bottom of the sea and looking up at us."

Australian sealions were observed on English Island in 1935 and 1937 and were photographed by a McCoy Society expedition there. In 1938, a visitor estimated there were roughly 300 present.
