= Spilsby Island =

Island in South Australia

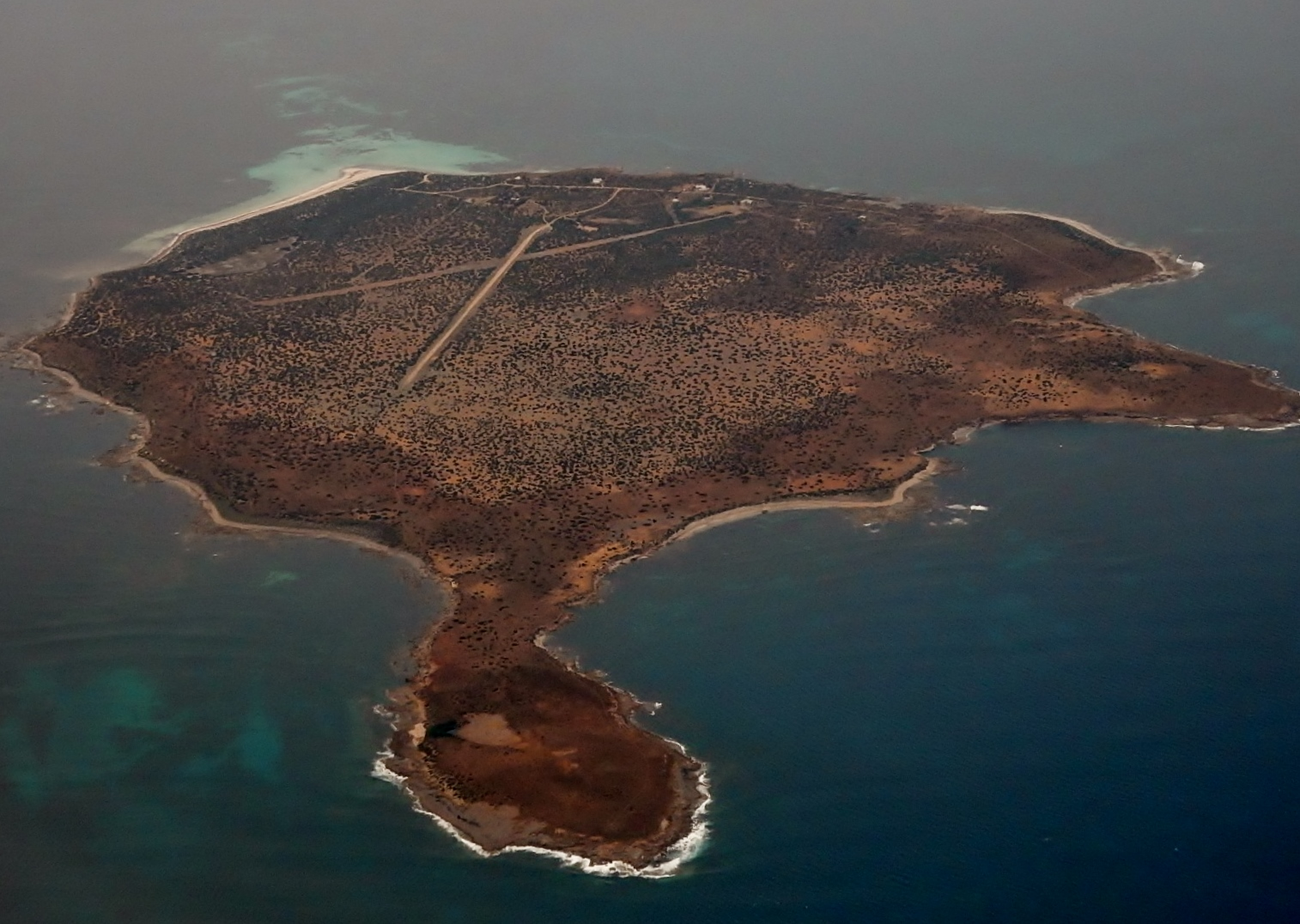

- Location within South Australia

Geography
- Location: Spencer Gulf
- Coordinates: 34°39′40″S 136°20′30″E
- Archipelago: Sir Joseph Banks Group
- Adjacent to: Spencer Gulf
- Highest elevation: 41 m (135 ft)Google Earth

Administration
- Australia
- South Australia

Demographics
- Population: 0

Spilsby Island is one of the largest islands in the Sir Joseph Banks Group in Spencer Gulf, South Australia. It is privately owned, has no permanent human residents and is grazed by sheep. The island was used for the breeding of sheep by James Hunter Kerrison, then for the breeding of horses, sheep, pigs and cattle by W. E. Scruby in the early 20th century. Shearers travelled to the island to shear the sheep. The island's soil has been enriched by the deposition of guano by seabirds. Land allotments and a few shacks are concentrated along the northern coast of the island. Butterfish Bay is on the northern coast and Hawknest Bay is on the eastern coast.

== History ==
Spilsby Island was named by Matthew Flinders after crew member Franklin's hometown in Lincolnshire. In the 19th and 20th centuries, the island was visited by fishers, shooters and guano miners.

The island was once owned by Joseph Sawyer. Sawyer worked in oyster dredging and cartage before taking up the lease on Spilsby Island. He travelled between Port Lincoln and Spilsby Island in the cutter Albion, which was later renamed Ammonia. His son, Spilsby Sawyer, was born on the island in 1872 and named after it. In 1885, Spilsby Island was made available to lease for agricultural purposes. Sawyer applied to lease the island but his application was rejected and the lease was issued to someone else.

Until his death in 1903, the island lease owned by Henry Mortlock Scruby. In 1904, there were three men, a boy and no women living on the island. In 1909, W. E. Scruby was growing wheat and barley across 300 acres of the island. The soil was dark, sandy loam vegetation which in some parts grew right to the water's edge.

While W. E. Scruby was lessee, he introduced and raised sheep, cattle and horses there. He also made efforts to reduce and control the rabbit population by poisoning them. Scruby had previously worked for the Engineering and Water Supply Department and constructed a dam on the island to catch rainwater. The island was offered under perpetual lease in 1933. Three dams had been dug by 1945, one of them being 17 yard long, 15 yards wide and 12 feet deep and dug in three weeks. W. E. Scruby's daughter, E. J. Scruby, was a nurse in Adelaide. In 1948 the Scruby family was in possession of a 99 year lease on the island and Jack Scruby was living alone there. At that time the newspaper was being dropped by passing plane.

In 1919, Eardley Tyrell was the manager of Spilsby Island. The island was occupied by Jim Kerrison from 1923 until he took a job with the Customs Department.

In the 1920s a lighthouse was operating on Spilsby Island. The proposition of erecting one there had been discussed in 1909.

== Climate ==
In 1945, the climate on the island was described as not exceeding 100 degrees Fahrenheit in the summer, and free of frost in the winter. It was suitable for growing vegetables and raising livestock. It received 11 inches of rain a year.

== Flora and fauna ==
Lessee Jim Kerrison introduced Chinchilla rabbits to the island. They were observed by the McCoy Society during a natural history expedition. It began as an experiment with Kerrison believing that he could profit by breeding them and selling their skins. The market for their skins collapsed and by the 1930s, their population numbered thousands. In 1933, it was thought that the animals could be eradicated for a cost of 10 or 20 pounds. The original rabbits (variously described as between two and six) escaped from captivity and proliferated, making homes in the north-western section of the island among limestone rubble and juniper bushes. Other plant life includes native grasses and ice plant.

In the 1920s, the island would commonly host four or five hundred Cape Barren Geese during breeding season. The geese were present on the island year-round, unlike on neighbouring islands. The Rock parrot and quail have also been seen there. In 1935, the Little penguin was living in burrows "all around" the shores of Spilsby Island. In 2006, there were an estimated 2,000 to 3,000 penguins on Spilsby Island. In 2011, that number had dropped to less than 100.

In the 20th century, people who fished near Spilsby Island caught salmon, whiting, snook, sea pike, snapper, sweep and other smaller fishes. In 1938, George Bird had a close encounter off Spilsby Island with a shark estimated to be 12 to 13 feet long, and R. G. Cowell hooked a 15 foot long Great white shark there the following year but his line broke and it got away. Zane Grey caught one there in 1939. Southern rock lobster also live off the island, and various Wobbegongs, also known as carpet sharks. Scruby said that in 1933 a fishing cutter took 10,000 Southern rock lobster, and after that, they became scarce. In 1936, fishermen described catching sweep as quickly as they could bait the hooks.

In 1941, Southern bluefin tuna occurred southeast of Spilsby Island. A spearfishing trip to the island from Port Lincoln in 1953 reported catching strongfish, trevally, silver drummer, Western blue groper and catching but not landing a 200 lb stingray.

== Surveys ==
In 1963, a survey of the island was made by teachers and pupils from Scotch College, led by the principal, Charles Fisher. The survey involved geographical, geological and biological investigations. The group discovered tungsten and molybdenum mineralisation, a sea anemone thought to be unique and other rare organisms.

== Shipwrecks ==
In 1882, a group of five men were found on Spilsby Island after being castaway there for nine days. They had been employed by the Sir Joseph Banks Guano Company. They had sailed to Dangerous Reef beforehand, where they had attempted to kill some Australian sea lions. They survived by catching and eating sheep after their vessel was wrecked. They expressed their gratitude to the mayor of Port Adelaide for his success in arranging a search and rescue operation. In 1899, the schooner Lucretia ran aground on Buffalo Reef, near Spilsby Island. In 1901, the Acamas became stranded on Sandy Spit north of Spilsby Island, and waited for a spring tide to refloat. In 1917, the ketch Ina was wrecked at the south-eastern end of the island. The vessel's anchor was recovered by chance in 1941. In 1923, the schooner Rooganah was damaged when it struck a rock off the island but did not sink. In 1924, James Marshall was drowned in rough weather off Spilsby Island. His body was not recovered.

The wreck of the Edith lies off the island's south-western shore.
