= Wake Island =

Pacific island administered by the United States

Wake Island: Islan Wake (Chamorro); Ānen Kio (Marshallese); Isla Wake (Spanish); Halcyon Island
- Unincorporated and unorganized U.S. territory
- Etymology: Named for 18th century sea captain
- Nickname: Wake
- Motto: "Where America's Day Really Begins"
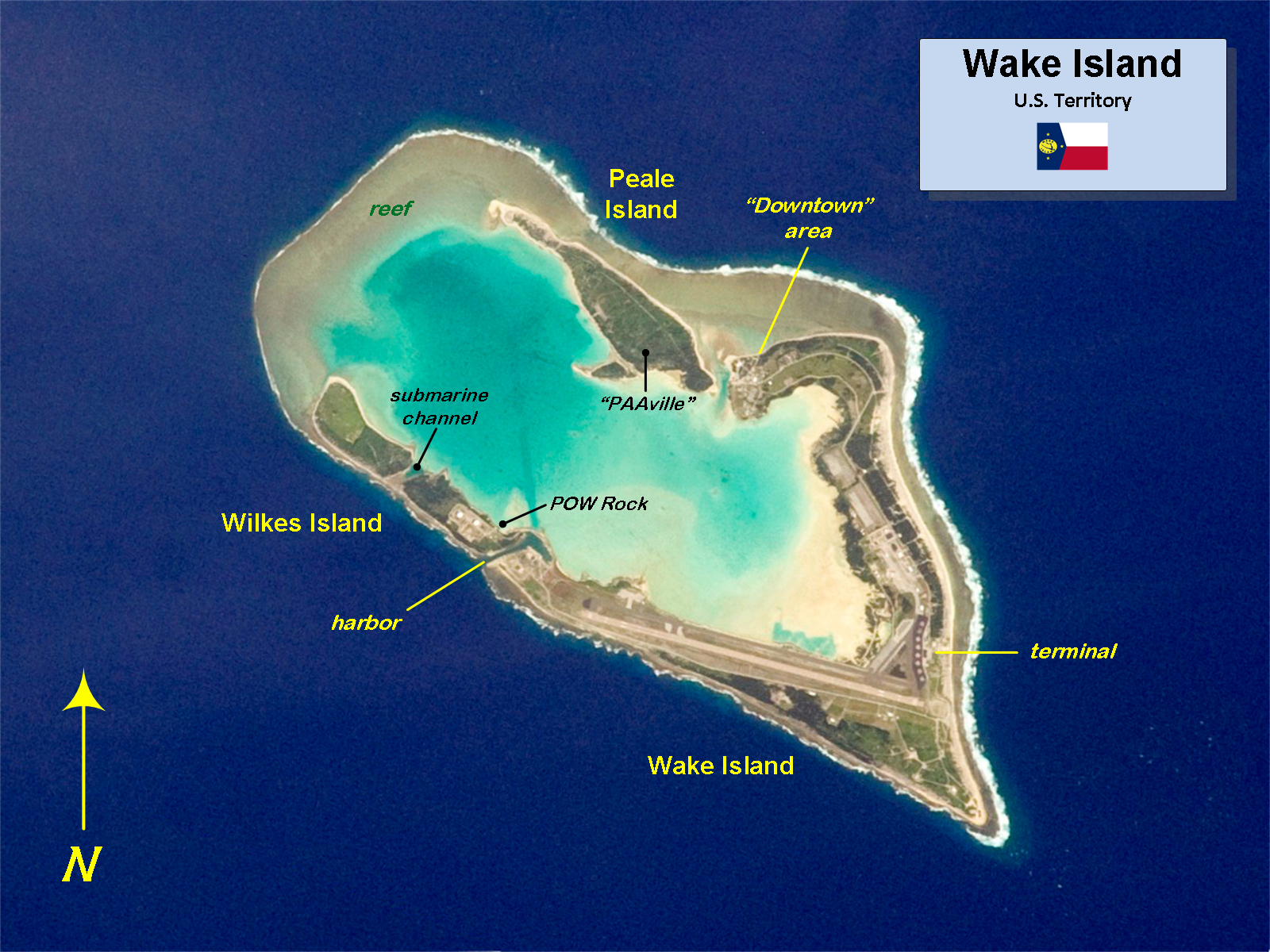
- Map of Wake Island

- Location in the North Pacific Ocean
- Coordinates: 19°17′43″N 166°37′52″E
- Administered by: United States
- Status: Unorganized unincorporated territory
- Territory: United States Minor Outlying Islands
- Claimed by: Marshall Islands
- Claimed by the United States: January 17, 1899
- Claimed by the Marshall Islands: 1973

Government
  - Body: United States Air Force (under the authority of the U.S. Department of the Interior)
  - President: Donald Trump (R)
  - Civil administrator: William K. Lane III

Area
  - Total: 5.35 sq mi (13.86 km^{2})
  - Land: 2.85 sq mi (7.38 km^{2})
  - Water: 2.50 sq mi (6.48 km^{2})
  - Lagoon: 2.00 sq mi (5.17 km^{2})
  - EEZ: 157,237 sq mi (407,241 km^{2})
- Highest elevation: 21 ft (6.4 m)
- Lowest elevation: 0 ft (0 m)

Population (2017)
  - Estimate: 0
  - Non-permanent residents: c. 100
- Time zone: UTC+12:00 (Wake Island Time Zone)
- APO / ZIP Code: 96898

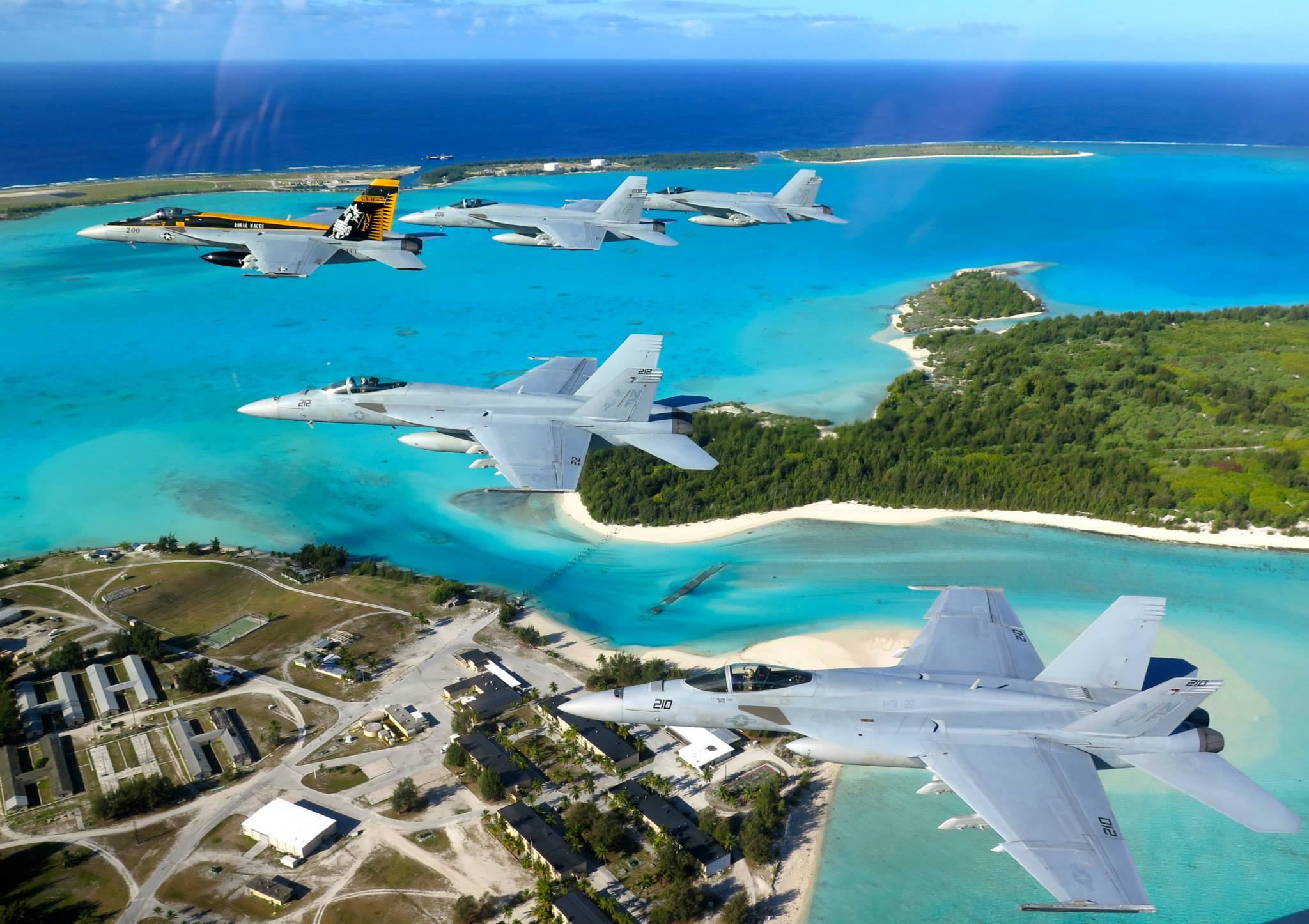
The VFA-27 Royal Maces, a United States Navy F/A-18E Super Hornet squadron based in MCAS Iwakuni, flies over the "Downtown" area of Wake Island.

Wake Island (Marshallese: Ānen Kio, lit. 'island of the kio flower'), also known as Wake Atoll (Chamorro: Islan Wake), is a coral atoll which is an unincorporated territory of the United States in the Micronesia subregion of the Pacific Ocean. The atoll is composed of three islets – Wake, Wilkes, and Peale Islands – surrounding a lagoon encircled by a coral reef. The nearest inhabited island is Utirik Atoll in the Marshall Islands, located 592 miles (953 kilometers) to the southeast.

The island may have been found by prehistoric Austronesian mariners before its first recorded discovery by Álvaro de Mendaña de Neira in 1568. Ships continued visiting the area in the following centuries, but the island remained undeveloped until the United States claimed it in 1899. Significant development of the island did not begin until 1935 when Pan American Airways constructed an airfield and hotel, establishing Wake Island as a stopover for trans-Pacific flying boat routes. In December 1941 at the opening of the Pacific Theatre of World War II Japan seized the island, which remained under Japanese occupation until the end of the war in September 1945. In 1972, Pan American Airways ceased using the island for trans-Pacific layovers because they had switched to Boeing 747 aircraft, which could cross the ocean without stopping. With the withdrawal of Pan American Airways, the island's administration was taken over by the United States Air Force, which later used the atoll as a processing location for Vietnamese refugees during Operation New Life in 1975.

Wake Island is claimed by the Marshall Islands but is administered by the United States as an unorganized and unincorporated territory and is part of the United States Minor Outlying Islands. The island is administered by the Department of the Interior and managed by the United States Air Force. While there are no permanent residents, approximately 300 people are on the island at any given time, primarily military personnel and contractors.

The natural areas of Wake are a mix of tropical trees, scrub, and grasses that have adapted to the limited rainfall. Thousands of hermit crabs and rats live on Wake, and in the past, cats were introduced to help control the rat population, which at one time was estimated at 2 million. The Wake Island rail, a small flightless bird, once lived on the atoll extirpated during World War II. Many seabird species also visit Wake, although the thick vegetation has caused most birds to nest in a designated bird sanctuary on Wilkes Island. The submerged and emergent lands at Wake Island are a unit of the Pacific Islands Heritage Marine National Monument.

== Etymology ==
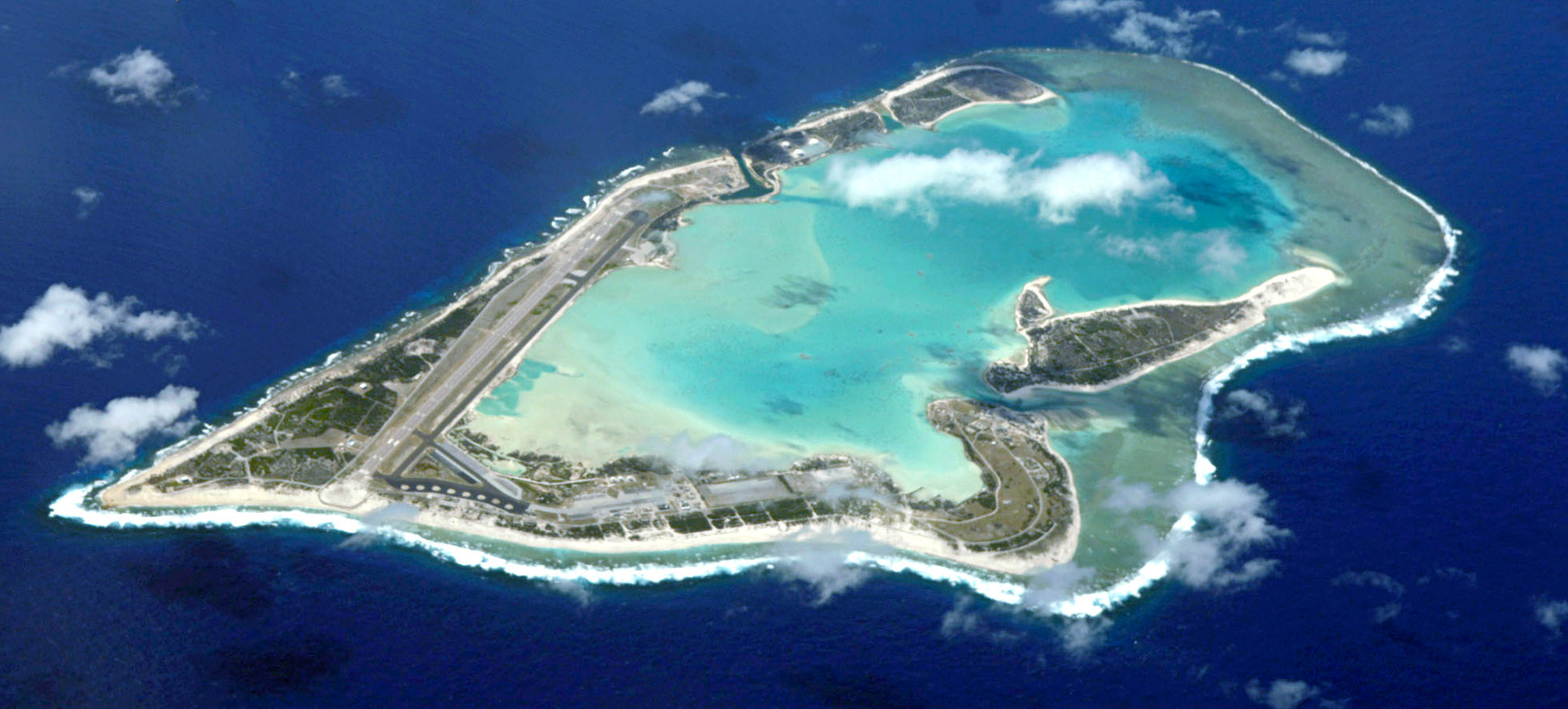
Wake Island

Wake Island derives its name from British sea captain Samuel Wake, who rediscovered the atoll in 1796 while in command of the Prince William Henry. The name is sometimes attributed to Captain William Wake, who also is reported to have discovered the atoll from the Prince William Henry in 1792.

Peale Island is named after the naturalist Titian Peale, who visited the island in 1841, and Wilkes Island is named after U.S. Naval officer Charles Wilkes, who led the U.S. expedition to Wake Atoll in 1841.

== History ==
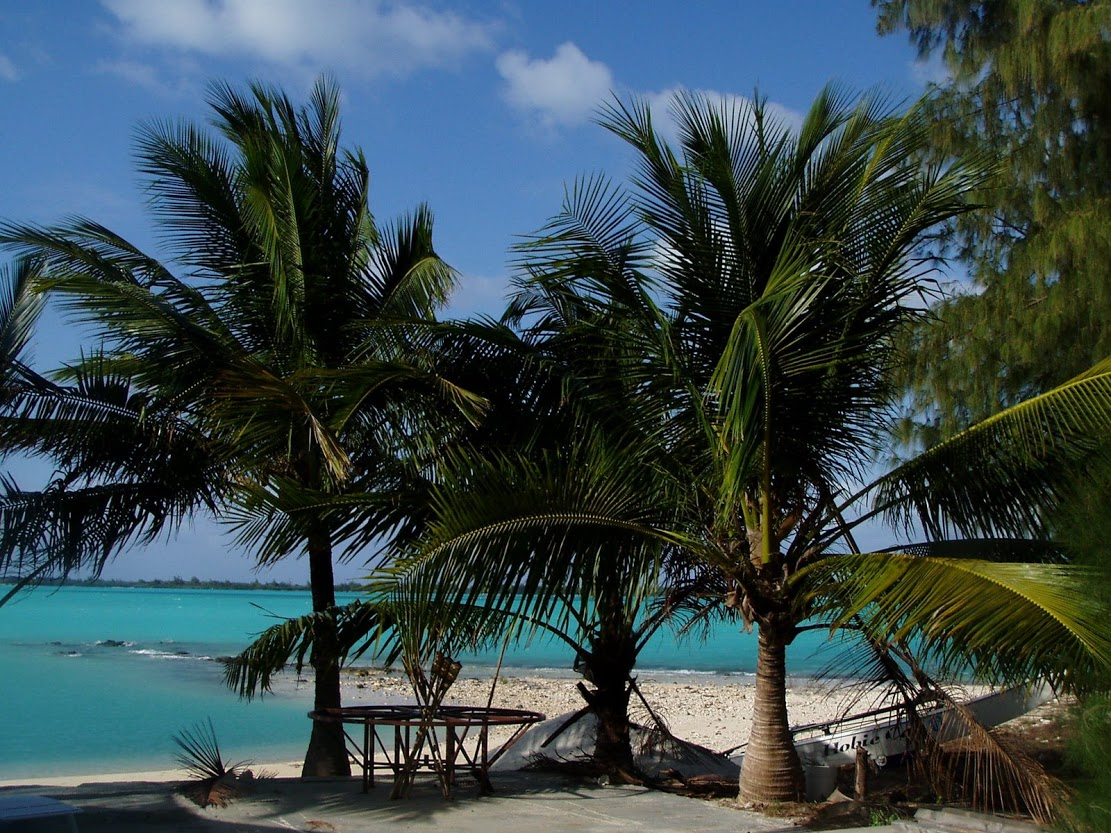
Palm trees at Wake Island's lagoon

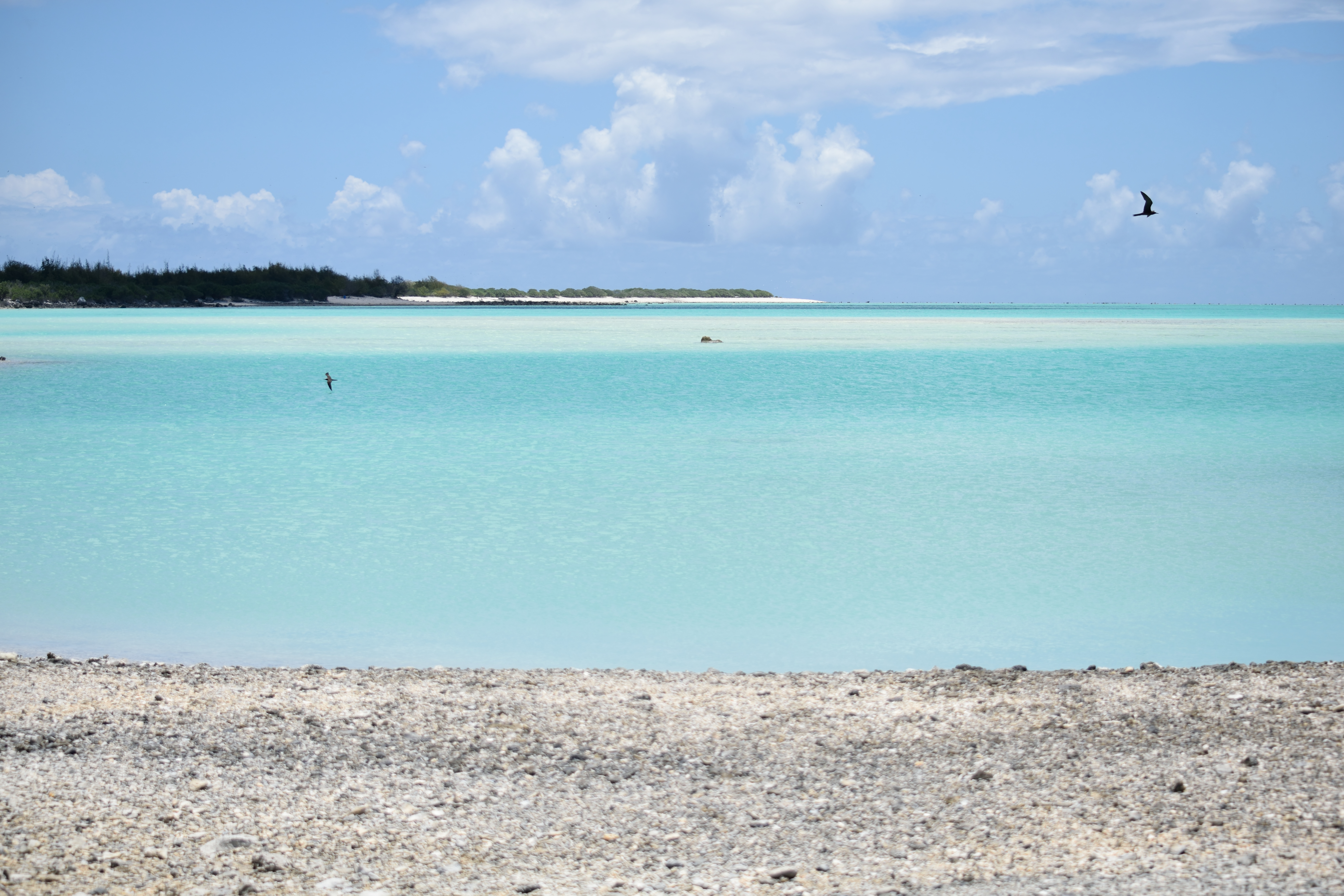
Wake's lagoon

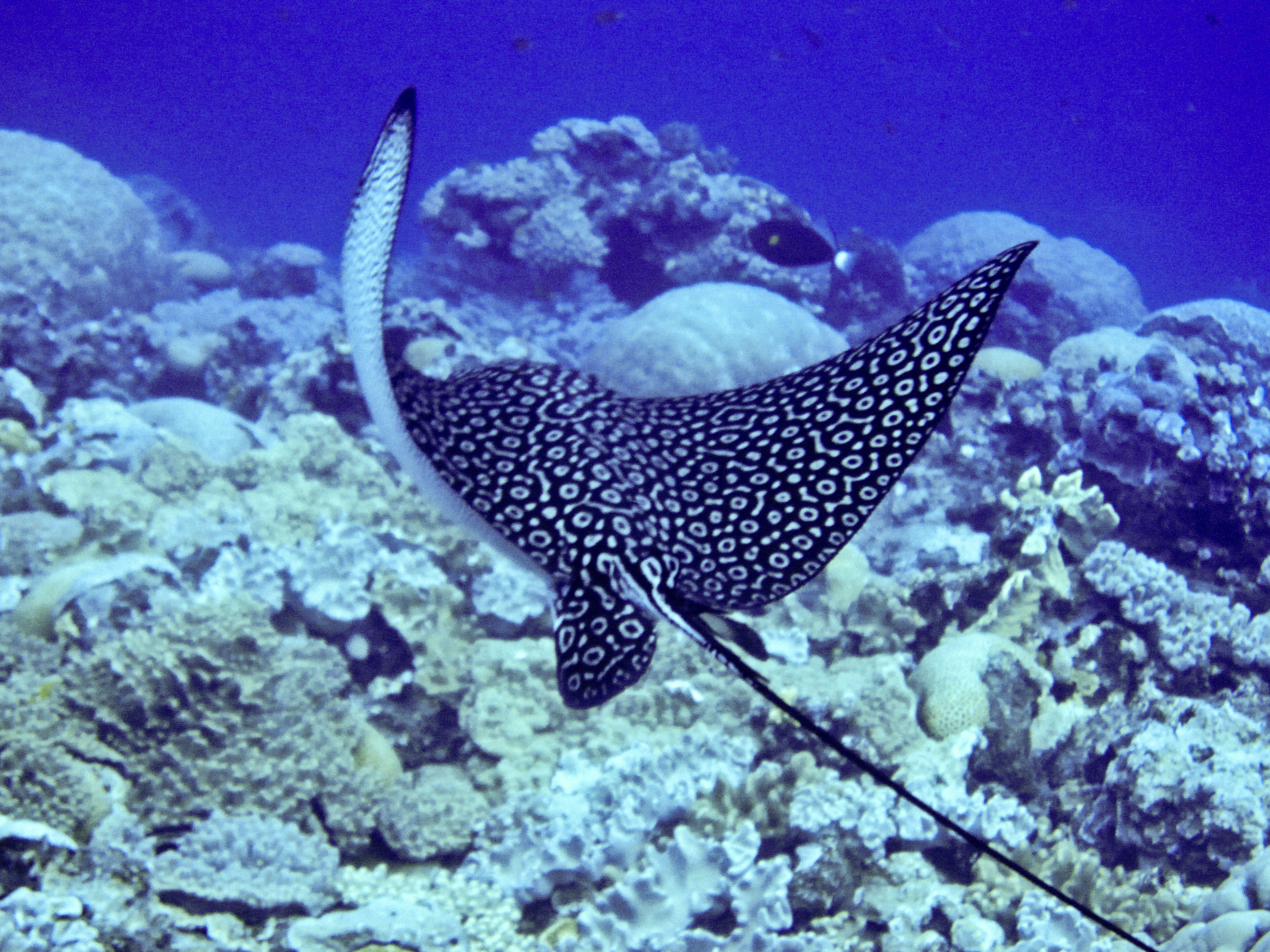
Spotted eagle ray (Aetobatus narinari) swims by Wake Island corals.

=== Prehistory ===
The presence of the Polynesian rat on the island suggests that Wake was likely visited by Polynesian or Micronesian voyagers at an early date. In the Marshallese oral tradition, stories tell of Ānen Kio, or "island of the orange flower," where men would collect albatross bones for tattooing rituals. Dwight Heine speculated that the Marshall Islanders treated Ānen Kio similarly to a game preserve for hunting and gathering food and that no one permanently lived there, similar to land usage practices on Bokak Atoll and Bikar Atoll. He also speculated that the islanders may have stopped traveling to Wake Atoll in the mid-1800s, around the time the first missionaries arrived in the Marshalls. However, the atoll's remoteness and lack of fresh water may have prevented permanent pre-modern human habitation; no ancient artifacts have been discovered.

=== Early exploration and shipwrecks ===
The first recorded discovery of Wake Island was on October 2, 1568, by Spanish explorer and navigator Álvaro de Mendaña de Neira. In 1567, Mendaña and his crew had set off on two ships, Los Reyes and Todos los Santos, from Callao, Peru, on an expedition to search for a gold-rich land in the South Pacific mentioned in Inca tradition. After visiting Tuvalu and the Solomon Islands, the expedition headed north and came upon Wake Island, "a low barren island, judged to be eight leagues in circumference". Since the date, October 2, was the eve of the feast of Saint Francis of Assisi, the captain named it St Francis Island (Spanish: Isla San Francisco). The ships were in need of water and the crew was suffering from scurvy, but after circling the island, it was determined that Wake was waterless and had "not a cocoanut (coconut) nor a pandanus" and "there was nothing on it but sea-birds, and sandy places covered with bushes." (It was while attempting to relocate Wake according to Mendaña's description of its coordinates that James Cook first reached the Hawaiian Islands.)

In 1796, Captain Samuel Wake of the merchant ship Prince William Henry also came upon Wake Island, naming the atoll Wake, for himself. Soon thereafter, the 80-ton fur trading merchant brig Halcyon arrived at Wake and Master Charles William Barkley, unaware of Captain Wake's visit and other prior European contact, named the atoll Halcyon Island in honor of his ship. In 1823, Captain Edward Gardner, while in command of the whaling ship Bellona, visited an island at 19°15′00″N 166°32′00″E, which he judged to be 20–25 miles (32–40 kilometers) long. The island was "covered with wood, having a very green and rural appearance". This report is considered to be another sighting of Wake Island.

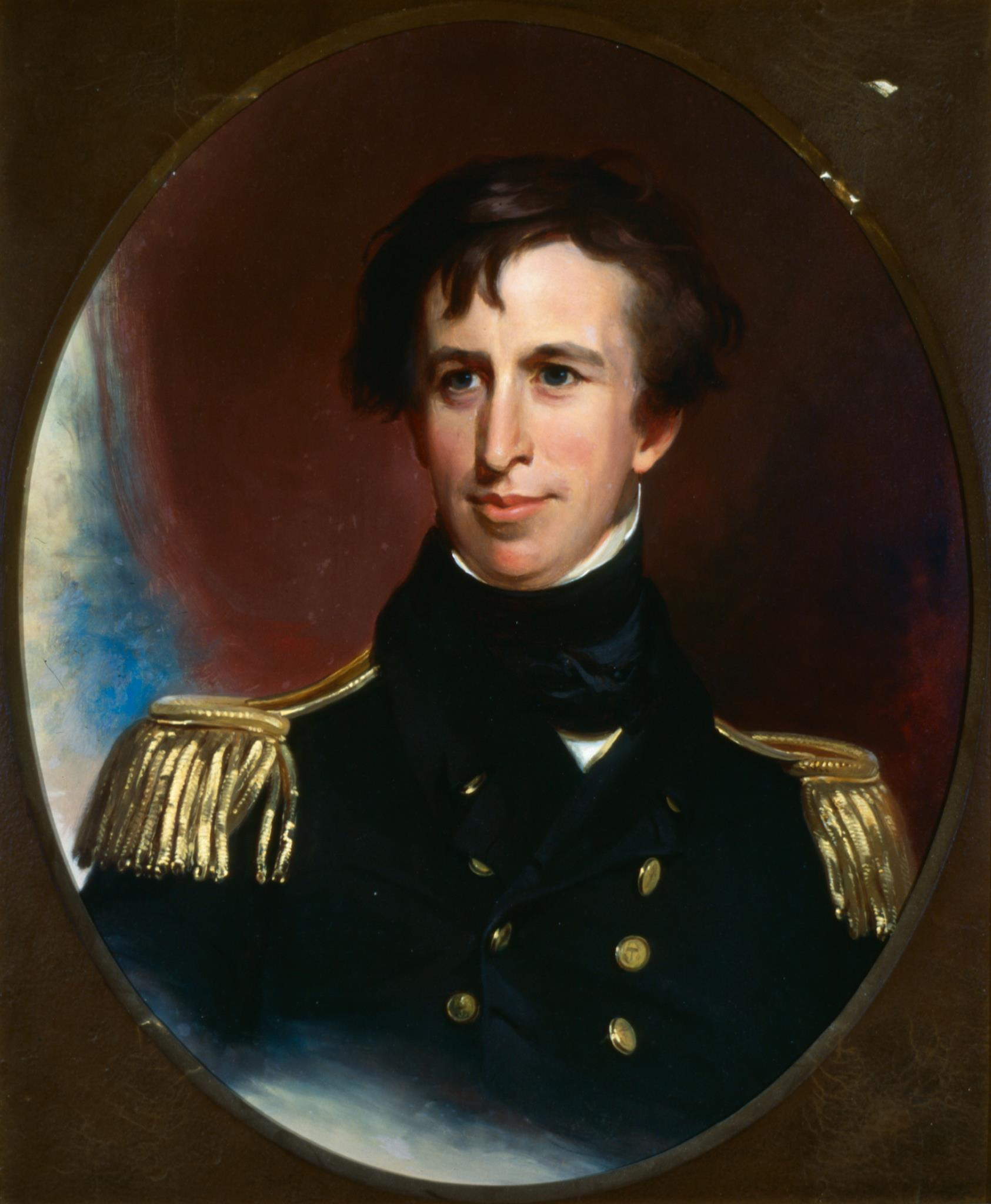
Lieutenant Charles Wilkes, commander of the U.S. Navy's United States Exploring Expedition, 1838–42

== 19th-century ==
=== USS Vincennes ===
On December 20, 1841, the United States Exploring Expedition, commanded by US Navy Lieutenant Charles Wilkes, arrived at Wake on USS Vincennes and sent several boats to survey the island. Wilkes described the atoll as "a low coral one, of triangular form and eight feet [2.4 m] above the surface. It has a large lagoon in the center, which was well filled with fish of a variety of species; among these were some fine mullet." He also noted that Wake had no fresh water but was covered with shrubs, "the most abundant of which was the tournefortia." The expedition's naturalist, Titian Peale, noted that "the only remarkable part in the formation of this island is the enormous blocks of coral that have been thrown up by the violence of the sea". Peale collected an egg from a short-tailed albatross and added other specimens, including a Polynesian rat, to the natural history collections of the expedition. Wilkes also reported that "from appearances, the island must be at times submerged, or the sea makes a complete breach over it".

=== Shipwrecks ===
==== SS Libelle ====
Wake Island first received international attention with the wreck of the barque Libelle. In March 1866, the 650-ton iron-hulled Libelle, of Bremen, commanded by Captain Anton Tobias, was en route from San Francisco to Hong Kong with a cargo of mercury. On the night of March 4, 1866, the Libelle struck the eastern reef of Wake Island during a gale. The passengers and crew were able to transfer to the atoll, but discovered there was no surface water available. After three days of fruitless searching and digging on the island for water, the crew instead recovered a 760 litres (200 US gal) water tank from the wrecked ship. They also recovered valuable cargo from the wreck, including coins, precious stones, and some of the 1,000 flasks of mercury, which they buried on the island.

After three weeks with a dwindling water supply and no sign of rescue, the passengers and crew decided to attempt to sail to Guam (the center of the then Spanish colony of the Mariana Islands) on the two remaining boats from Libelle. Twenty-two passengers and some of the crew sailed in the 22-foot (7 m) longboat under the command of First Mate Rudolf Kausch, and the remainder of the crew sailed with Captain Tobias in the 20-foot (6 m) gig. On April 8, 1866, the longboat reached Guam after 13 days of frequent squalls, short rations, and tropical sun. However, the gig commanded by the captain was lost at sea.

The Spanish governor of the Mariana Islands, Francisco Moscoso y Lara, welcomed and aided the Libelle shipwreck survivors in Guam. He also ordered the schooner Ana, owned and commanded by his son-in-law George H. Johnston, to be dispatched with first mate Kausch to search for the missing gig and then sail on to Wake Island to confirm the shipwreck story and recover the buried goods. Ana departed Guam on April 10 and, after two days at Wake Island, found and salvaged the buried coins, precious stones, and a small quantity of the quicksilver.

==== Dashing Wave ====
On July 29, 1870, the British tea clipper Dashing Wave, under the command of Captain Henry Vandervord, sailed out of Fuzhou en route to Sydney. On August 31, "the weather was very thick, and it was blowing a heavy gale from the eastward, attended with violent squalls and a tremendous sea." At 10:30 pm, breakers were seen, and the ship struck the reef at Wake Island. The vessel began to break up overnight, and at 10:00 am, the crew launched the longboat over the leeward side. In the chaos of the evacuation, the captain secured a chart and nautical instruments but no compass. The crew loaded a case of wine, some bread, and two buckets, but no drinking water. Since Wake Island appeared to have neither food nor water, the captain and his 12-man crew quickly departed, crafting a makeshift sail by attaching a blanket to an oar. With no water, each man was allotted a glass of wine daily until a heavy rain shower came on the sixth day. After 31 days of drifting westward in the longboat, they reached Kosrae (Strong's Island) in the Caroline Islands. Captain Vandervord attributed the loss of Dashing Wave to the erroneous way Wake Island "is laid down in the charts. It is very low, and not easily seen even on a clear night."

=== American annexation ===
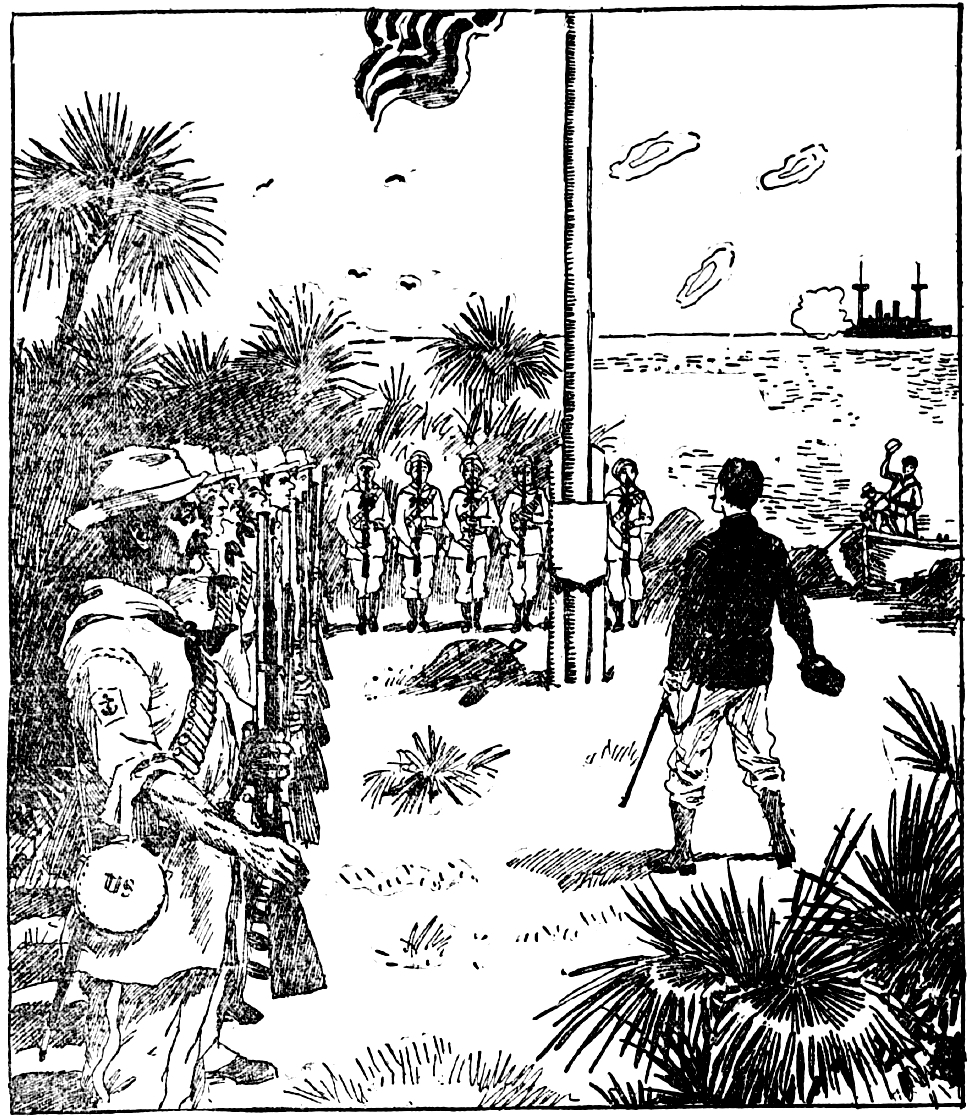
Commander Edward D. Taussig of USS Bennington takes formal possession of Wake Island for the United States with the raising of the flag and a 21-gun salute on January 17, 1899.

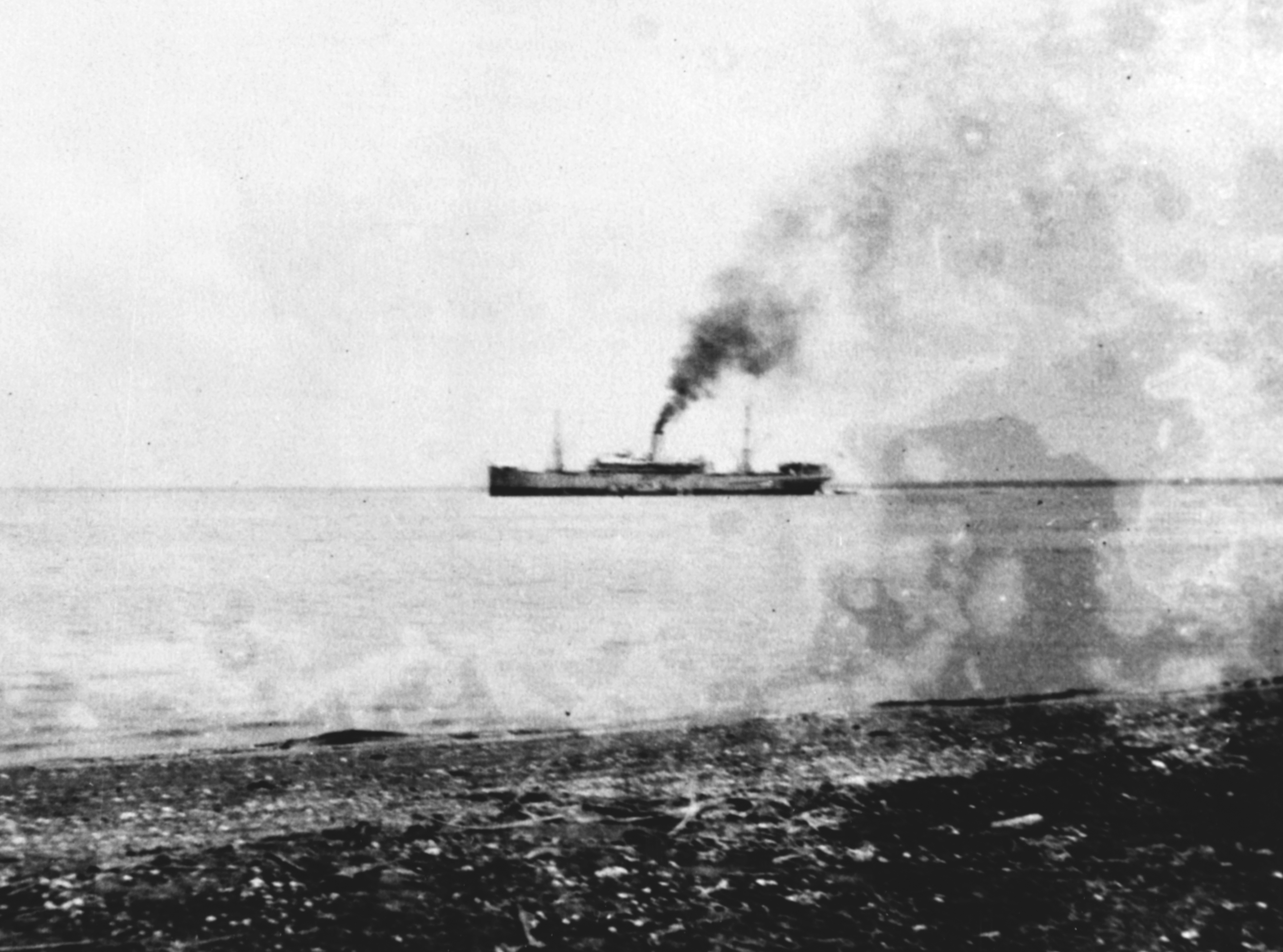
USS Newport News (AK-3) visits Wake Island in 1922, and puts emergency water and supplies in case shipwrecked mariners are stranded there.

With the annexation of Hawaii in 1898 and the acquisition of Guam and the Philippines resulting from the conclusion of the Spanish–American War that same year, the United States began to consider the unclaimed and uninhabited Wake Island, located approximately halfway between Honolulu and Manila, as a good location for a telegraph cable station, and a coaling station that could be used to refuel warships of the rapidly expanding United States Navy as well as passing merchant and passenger steamships.

On July 4, 1898, United States Army Brigadier General Francis V. Greene of the 2nd Brigade, Philippine Expeditionary Force, of the Eighth Army Corps, stopped at Wake Island and raised the United States flag while en route to the Philippines on the steamship liner SS China.

On January 17, 1899, under orders from President William McKinley, Commander Edward D. Taussig of USS Bennington landed on Wake and formally took possession of the island for the United States. After a 21-gun salute, the flag was raised, and a brass plate was affixed to the flagstaff with the following inscription:

United States of America

William McKinley, President;
John D. Long, Secretary of the Navy.
Commander Edward D. Taussig, U.S.N.,
Commander U.S.S. Bennington,
this 17th day of January 1899, took
possession of the Atoll known as Wake
Island for the United States of America.

== Early 20th century ==
At the turn of the 20th century, the Commercial Pacific Cable Company was considering routes for a submarine cable between Honolulu and Guam, Although the route using Wake Island as a cable station would have been shorter by 137 miles (220 km) than the route using the Midway Islands, in the end Midway and not Wake Island was chosen as the location for the cable station. Rear Admiral Royal Bird Bradford, chief of the U.S. Navy's Bureau of Equipment, stated before the U.S. House of Representatives Committee on Interstate and Foreign Commerce on January 17, 1902, that "Wake Island seems at times to be swept by the sea. It is only a few feet above the level of the ocean, and if a cable station were established there, costly work would be required; besides, it has no harbor, while the Midway Islands are perfectly habitable and have a fair harbor for vessels of 18 feet (5 m) draught."

On June 23, 1902, USAT Buford, commanded by Captain Alfred Croskey and bound for Manila, spotted a ship's boat on the beach as it passed closely by Wake Island. Soon thereafter, a Japanese crew launched the boat and sailed out to meet the transport. The Japanese told Captain Croskey that they had been put on the island by a schooner from Yokohama in Japan and that they were gathering guano and drying fish. However, Captain Croskey suspected they were engaged in pearl hunting. The Japanese revealed that one of their parties needed medical attention, and the captain determined from their descriptions of the symptoms that the illness was most likely beriberi. They informed Captain Croskey that they did not need any provisions or water and expected the Japanese schooner to return in a month or so. The Japanese declined an offer to be taken on the transport to Manila and were given some medical supplies for the sick man, some tobacco, and a few incidentals.

After USAT Buford reached Manila, Captain Croskey reported the Japanese presence at Wake Island. He also learned that USAT Sheridan had a similar encounter at Wake with the Japanese. The incident was brought to the attention of Assistant Secretary of the Navy Charles Darling, who at once informed the State Department and suggested that an explanation from the Japanese Government was needed. In August 1902, Japanese Minister Takahira Kogorō provided a diplomatic note stating that the Japanese government had "no claim whatever to make on the sovereignty of the island, but that if any subjects are found on the island the Imperial Government expects that they should be properly protected as long as they are engaged in peaceful occupations."

Wake Island was now clearly a territory of the United States, but the island was only occasionally visited by passing American ships during this period. One notable visit occurred in December 1906, when U.S. Army General John J. Pershing, later famous as the commander of the American Expeditionary Forces in western Europe during World War I, stopped at Wake on USAT Thomas and hoisted a 45-star U.S. flag that was improvised out of sail canvas.

=== Japanese activity ===
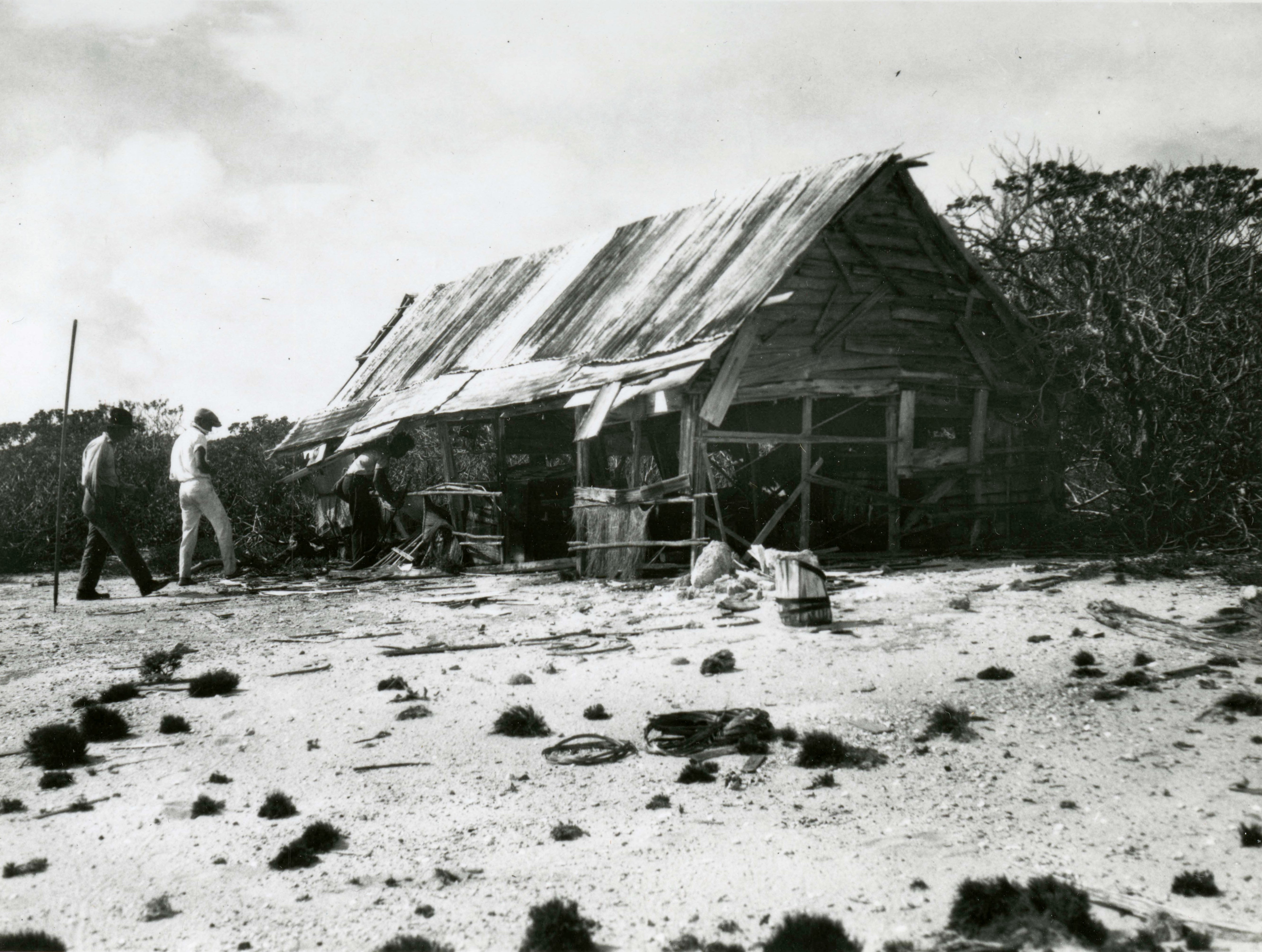
Members of the Tanager Expedition explore an abandoned feather collecting camp on Peale Island.

With limited freshwater resources, no harbor, and no plans for development, Wake Island remained a remote and uninhabited Pacific island in the early 20th century. However, a large seabird population attracted Japanese feather collectors. A global demand for feathers and plumage was driven by the millinery industry and popular European fashion designs for hats, while other demand came from pillow and bedspread manufacturers. Japanese poachers set up camps to harvest feathers on many remote islands in the Central Pacific. The feather trade was primarily focused on Laysan albatross, black-footed albatross, masked booby, lesser frigatebird, great frigatebird, sooty tern and other species of tern.

On February 6, 1904, Rear Admiral Robley D. Evans arrived at Wake Island on USS Adams and observed Japanese collecting feathers and catching sharks for their fins. Abandoned feather poaching camps were seen by the crew of the submarine tender USS Beaver in 1922 and USS Tanager in 1923. Although feather collecting and plumage exploitation had been outlawed in the territorial United States, there is no record of any enforcement actions at Wake Island.

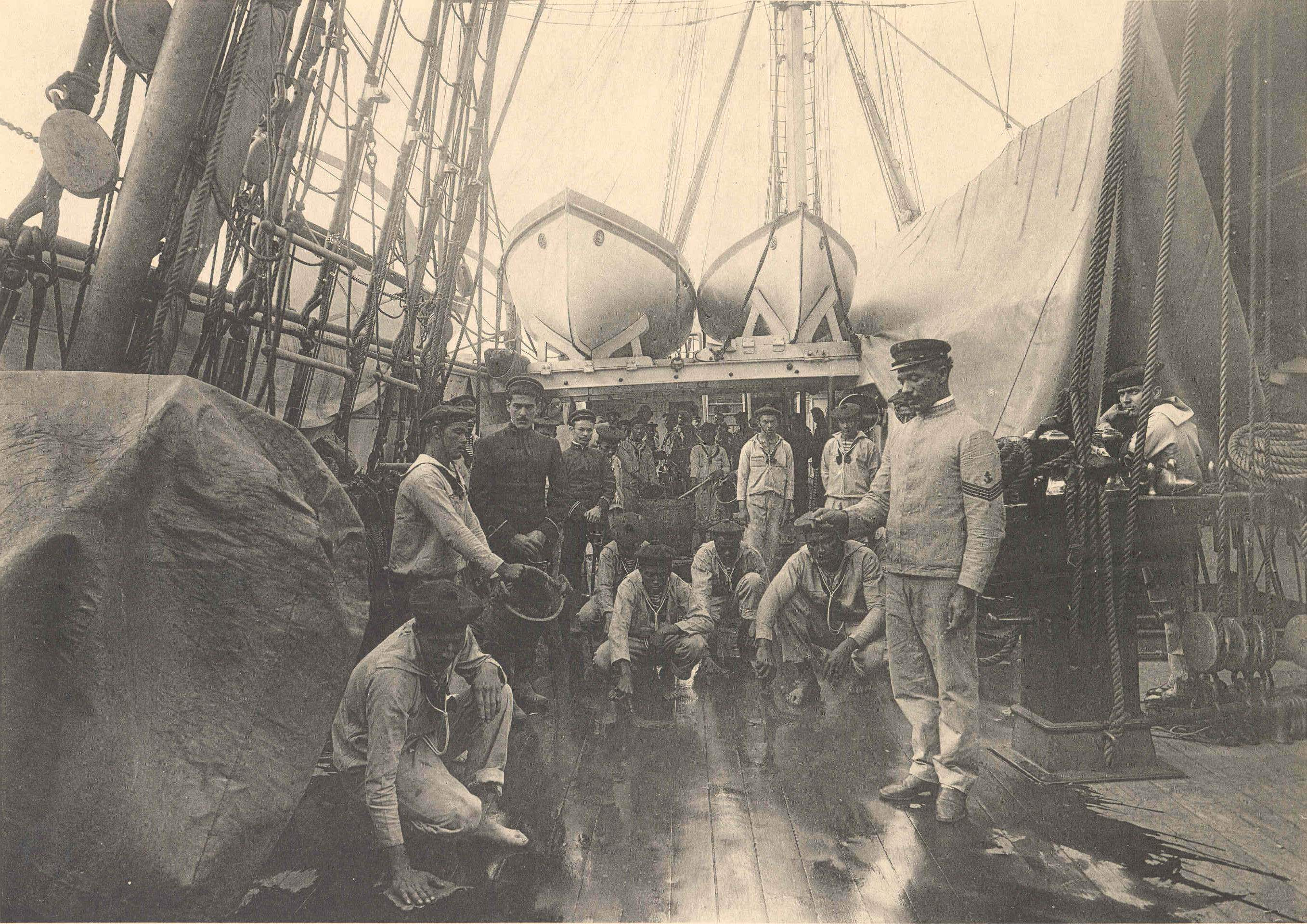
The Benjamin Constant

In January 1908, the Japanese ship Toyoshima Maru, en route from Tateyama, Japan, to the South Pacific, encountered a heavy storm that disabled the ship and swept the captain and five of the crew overboard. The 36 remaining crew members landed on Wake Island and endured five months of great hardship, disease, and starvation. In May 1908, the Brazilian Navy training ship Benjamin Constant, while on a voyage around the world, passed by the island and spotted a tattered red distress flag. Unable to land a boat, the crew executed a challenging three-day rescue operation using rope and cable to bring on board the 20 survivors and transported them to Yokohama.

=== 1920–1935 ===
With the rise of imperialist ambitions in Japan, Hector C. Bywater foresaw conflict between the United States and Japan. In his 1921 book Sea-Power in the Pacific: A Study of the American-Japanese Naval Problem, Bywater recommended establishing a well-defended fueling station at Wake Island to provide coal and oil for United States Navy ships engaged in future operations against Japan.

On June 19, 1922, the submarine tender USS Beaver landed an investigating party to determine the practicality and feasibility of establishing a naval fueling station on Wake Island. Lt. Cmdr. Sherwood Picking reported that from "a strategic point of view, Wake Island could not be better located, dividing as it does with Midway, the passage from Honolulu to Guam into almost exact thirds." He observed that the boat channel was choked with coral heads and that the lagoon was very shallow and not over 15 feet (5 m) in depth, and therefore Wake would not be able to serve as a base for surface vessels. Picking suggested clearing the channel to the lagoon for "loaded motor sailing launches" so that parties on shore could receive supplies from passing ships, and he strongly recommended that Wake be used as a base for aircraft. Picking stated, "If the long heralded trans-Pacific flight ever takes place, Wake Island should certainly be occupied and used as an intermediate resting and fueling port."

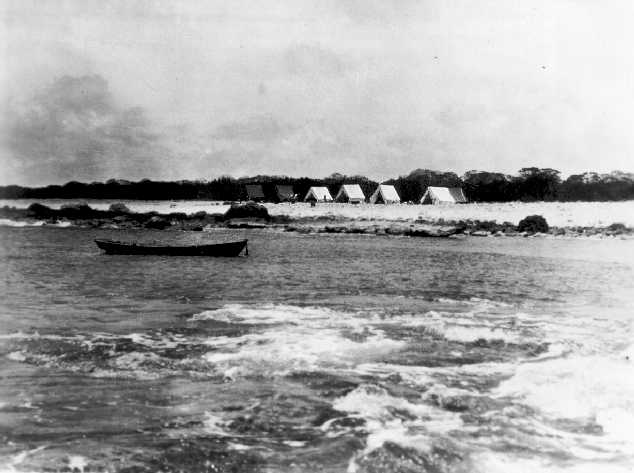
Tanager Expedition tent camp in 1923 at Wake Island, established on the eastern end of Wilkes Island

In 1923, a joint expedition by the then Bureau of the Biological Survey (in the U.S. Department of Agriculture), the Bernice Pauahi Bishop Museum and the United States Navy was organized to conduct a thorough biological survey of the Northwestern Hawaiian Islands, then administered by the Biological Survey Bureau as the Hawaiian Islands Bird Reservation. On February 1, 1923, Secretary of Agriculture Henry C. Wallace contacted Secretary of Navy Edwin Denby to request Navy participation and recommended expanding the expedition to Johnston Atoll, Midway and Wake, all islands not administered by the Department of Agriculture. On July 27, 1923, USS Tanager, a World War I minesweeper, brought the Tanager Expedition to Wake Island under the leadership of ornithologist Alexander Wetmore, and a tent camp was established on the eastern end the atoll. From July 27 to August 5, the expedition charted the atoll, made extensive zoological and botanical observations, and gathered specimens for the Bishop Museum while the naval vessel under the command of Lt. Cmdr. Samuel Wilder King conducted a depth sounding survey offshore. Other achievements at Wake included examinations of three abandoned Japanese feather poaching camps, scientific observations of the Wake Island rail, and confirmation that Wake Island is an atoll, a group of three islands with a central lagoon. Wetmore named the southwest island for Charles Wilkes, who had led the original pioneering United States Exploring Expedition to Wake in 1841. The northwest island was named for Titian Peale, the chief naturalist of that 1841 expedition.

== Pan American Airways ==
Pan American flew three of the largest aircraft built in the US up to that time, the Martin M-130 (pictured), on routes across the Pacific using remote islands like Wake as stopovers on flights to China, the Philippines, and Hawaii.

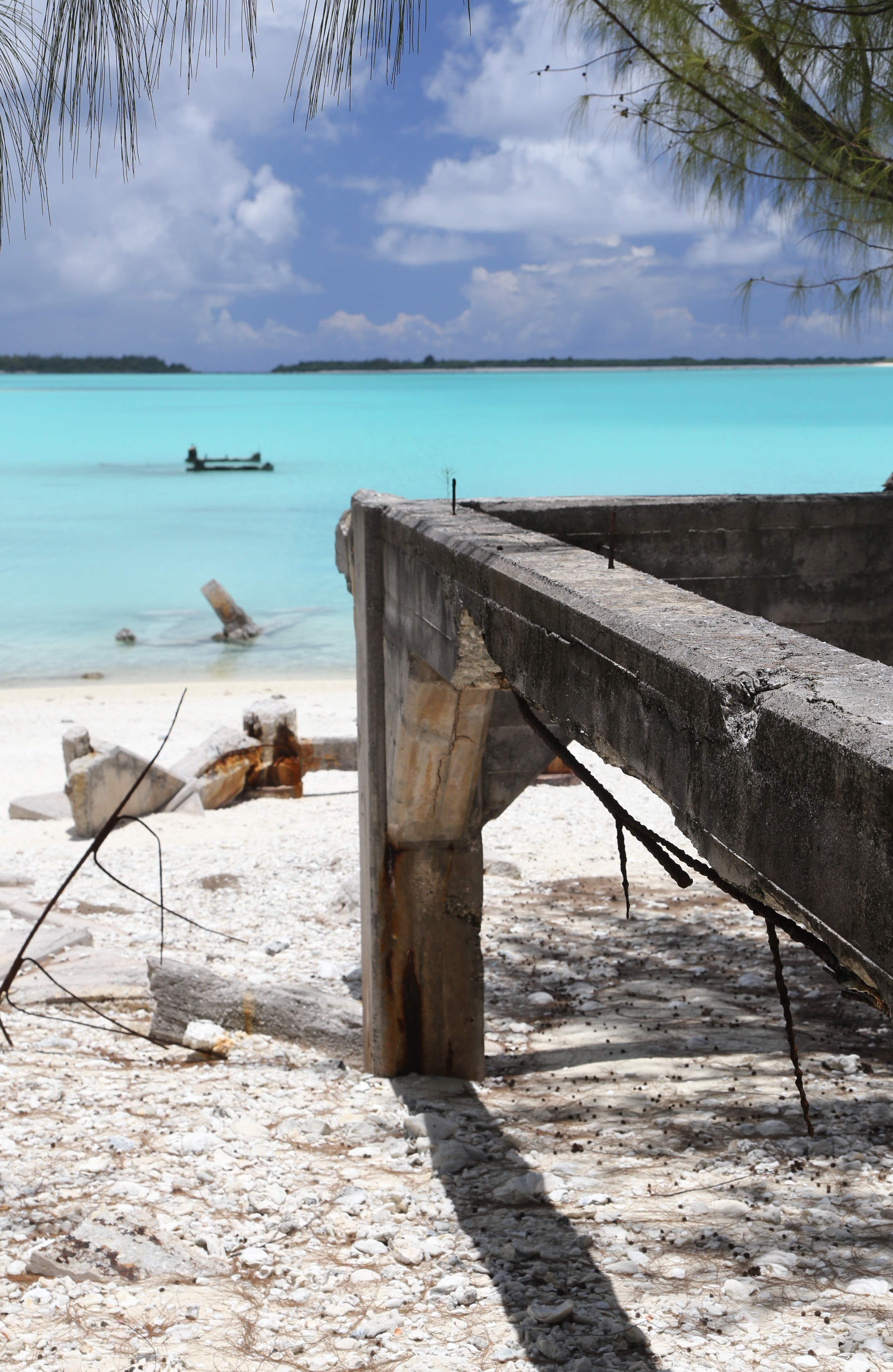
Remains of Pan-Am pier for the seaplane refueling station and airport

In the 1930s, Juan Trippe, president of Pan American Airways (PAA), the world's then-largest airline, wanted to expand globally by offering passenger air service between the United States and China. To cross the Pacific Ocean, his planes would need to island-hop, stopping at various points for refueling and maintenance. He first tried to plot the route on his own globe, but it showed only open sea between Midway and Guam. He went to the New York Public Library to study 19th-century clipper ship logs and charts and he "discovered" a little-known coral atoll, Wake Island. To proceed with his plans to build landing facilities at Wake and Midway, Trippe would need to seek access to each island and approval to construct and operate facilities; however, the islands were not under the jurisdiction of any specific U.S. government entity. On October 3, 1934, Trippe wrote to the Secretary of the Navy, requesting a five-year lease on Wake Island with an option for four renewals.

Following World War I, the League of Nations, in recognition of Japan's alliance with the Allied Powers, had granted the South Seas Mandate ("Nanyo") to Japan. This included the already Japanese-held Micronesia islands north of the equator that were part of the former colony of German New Guinea of the German Empire, including the modern nation/states of Palau, The Federated States of Micronesia, The Northern Mariana Islands and the Marshall Islands. In the 1920s and 1930s, Japan restricted access to this mandated territory and began to develop harbors and airfields throughout Micronesia in defiance of the Washington Naval Treaty of 1922, which prohibited both the United States and Japan from expanding military fortifications in the Pacific islands.

U.S. Navy military planners and the U.S. State Department became increasingly alarmed by Japan's expansionist attitude and growing belligerence in the Western Pacific. With Trippe's planned Pan American Airways aviation route passing through Wake and Midway, the U.S. Navy and the State Department saw an opportunity to project American air power across the Pacific under the guise of a commercial aviation enterprise. Given the potential military value of PAA's base development, on November 13, 1934, Chief of Naval Operations Admiral William H. Standley ordered a survey of Wake by USS Nitro and on December 29, President Franklin D. Roosevelt issued Executive Order 6935, which placed Wake Island and also Johnston Atoll, Sand Island at Midway and Kingman Reef under the control of the Department of the Navy. Rear Admiral Harry E. Yarnell designated Wake Island as a bird sanctuary to disguise the Navy's military intentions.

USS Nitro arrived at Wake Island on March 8, 1935, and conducted a two-day ground, marine, and aerial survey, providing the Navy with strategic observations and complete photographic coverage of the atoll. Four days later, on March 12, Secretary of the Navy Claude A. Swanson formally granted Pan American Airways permission to construct facilities on Wake Island.

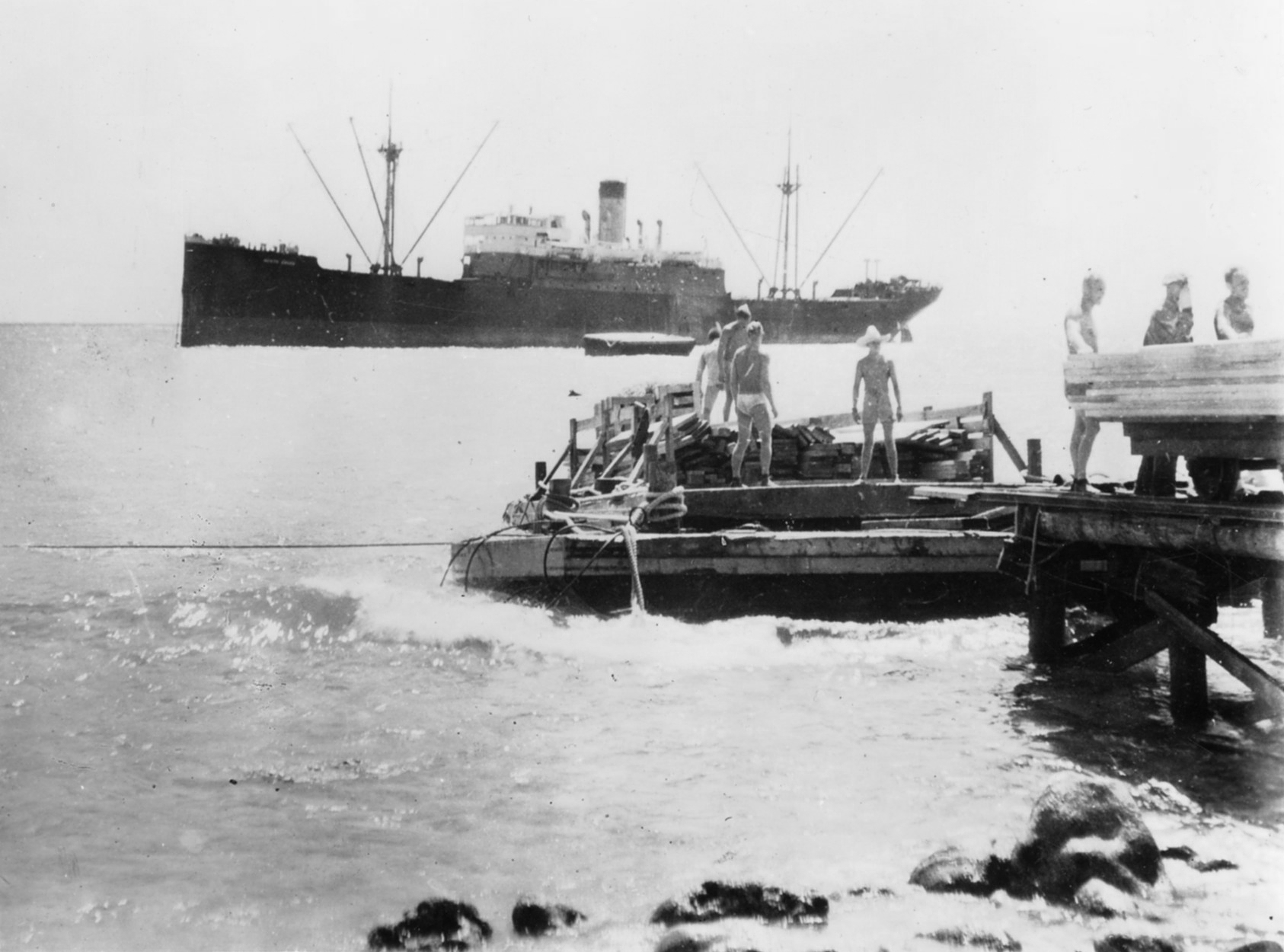
Pan American Airways (PAA) construction workers "lighter" building materials from SS North Haven to the dock at Wilkes Island, Wake Atoll

To construct bases in the Pacific, PAA chartered the 6,700-ton freighter SS North Haven, which arrived at Wake Island on May 9, 1935, with construction workers and the necessary materials and equipment to start to build Pan American facilities and to clear the lagoon for a flying boat landing area. The atoll's encircling coral reef prevented the ship from entering and anchoring in the shallow lagoon; the only suitable location for ferrying supplies and workers ashore was at nearby Wilkes Island. However, the chief engineer of the expedition, Charles R. Russell, determined that Wilkes was not high enough above sea level to prevent periodic flooding, and that Peale Island, on the other side of the lagoon, was the best site for the Pan American facilities. To get building materials to Peale, the materials were lightered from ship to shore, carried across Wilkes, and then transferred to another barge and towed across the lagoon to Peale Island. Using railroad track rails that inadvertently had been loaded onto North Haven, the men built a narrow-gauge railway to make it easier to haul the supplies across Wilkes to the lagoon using a flatbed car pulled by a tractor.

On June 12, North Haven departed for Guam, leaving behind various PAA technicians and a construction crew.

The lagoon couldn't be used by flying boats until coral heads had been cleared out. Bill Mullahey, a swimmer and free diver from Columbia University, was tasked with placing dynamite charges to blast hundreds of coral heads out of a 1 mile (1,600 m) long, 300 yards (270 m) wide, 6 feet (2 m) deep landing area. In total some 5 short tons (4.5 metric tons) of dynamite were used over three months on the coral heads.

With the lagoon cleared of obstructions, on August 17, 1935, the first PAA flying boat landed during a survey flight of the route between Midway and Wake.

On February 5, 1936, the North Haven returned with enough material to complete the construction of the PAA facilities. A five-ton diesel locomotive for the Wilkes Island railroad was offloaded, and the railway track was extended to run from dock to dock. Across the lagoon on Peale, workers assembled the Pan American Hotel, a prefabricated structure with two wings built out from a central lobby. Each of the 48 rooms had wide porches and verandas, and a bathroom with a hot-water shower. The PAA facilities staff included a group of Chamorro men from Guam who were employed as kitchen helpers, hotel service attendants, and laborers. This small village on Peale was nicknamed "PAAville" and was the first "permanent" human settlement on Wake.

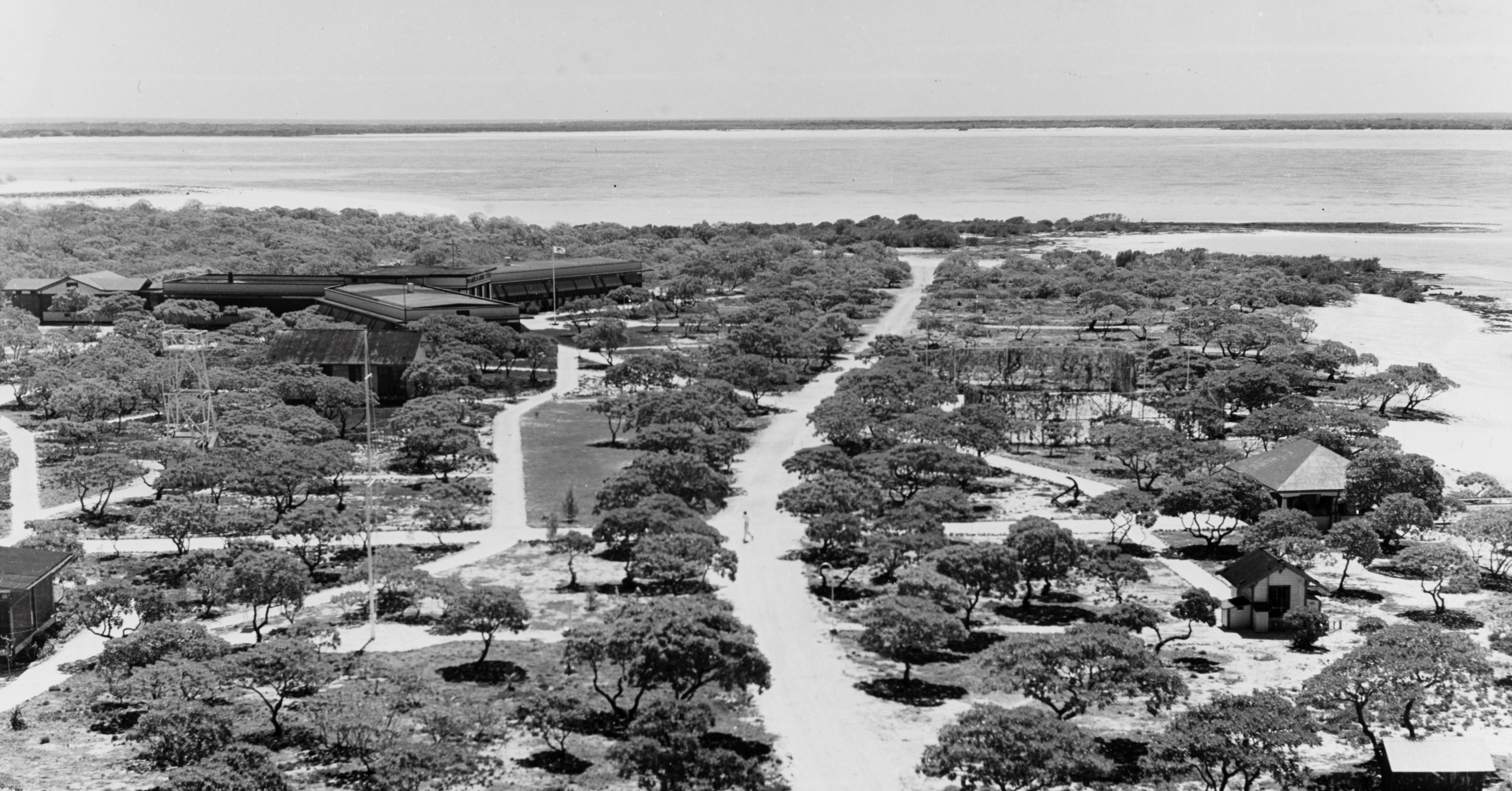
Aerial view of Pan American Airways Hotel and facilities on Peale Island at Wake Atoll. The hotel is on the left; the anchor from the Libelle shipwreck and the pergola leading to the "Clipper" seaplane dock is on the right.

By October 1936, Pan American Airways was ready to begin flights across the Pacific on its small fleet of three Martin M-130 "Flying Clippers". On October 11, the China Clipper landed at Wake on a press flight with ten journalists on board. A week later, PAA President Juan Trippe and a group of VIP passengers arrived at Wake on the Philippine Clipper (NC14715). On October 25, the Hawaii Clipper (NC14714) landed at Wake with the first paying airline passengers ever to cross the Pacific.

In 1937, Wake Island became a regular stop for PAA's international trans-Pacific passenger and airmail service, with two scheduled flights per week, one westbound from Midway and one eastbound from Guam. Pan Am also flew the Boeing 314 Clipper flying boats, in addition to the Martin M130.

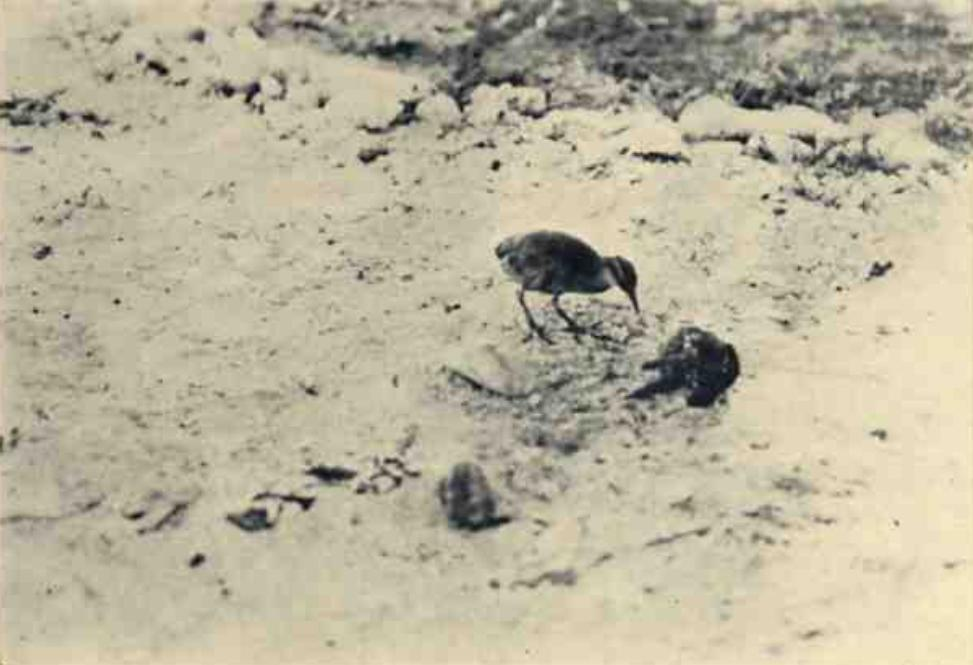
Observations by those visiting the Pan-Am hotel in the late 1930s provided some of the only observations of living Wake Island rails, a flightless bird that was native to the atoll but was extirpated during World War II.

Because bringing in fresh vegetables for its passengers was costly, and the atoll lacked natural soil, PAA was one of the earliest successful users of hydroponics to grow vegetables on Wake.

=== American military base ===
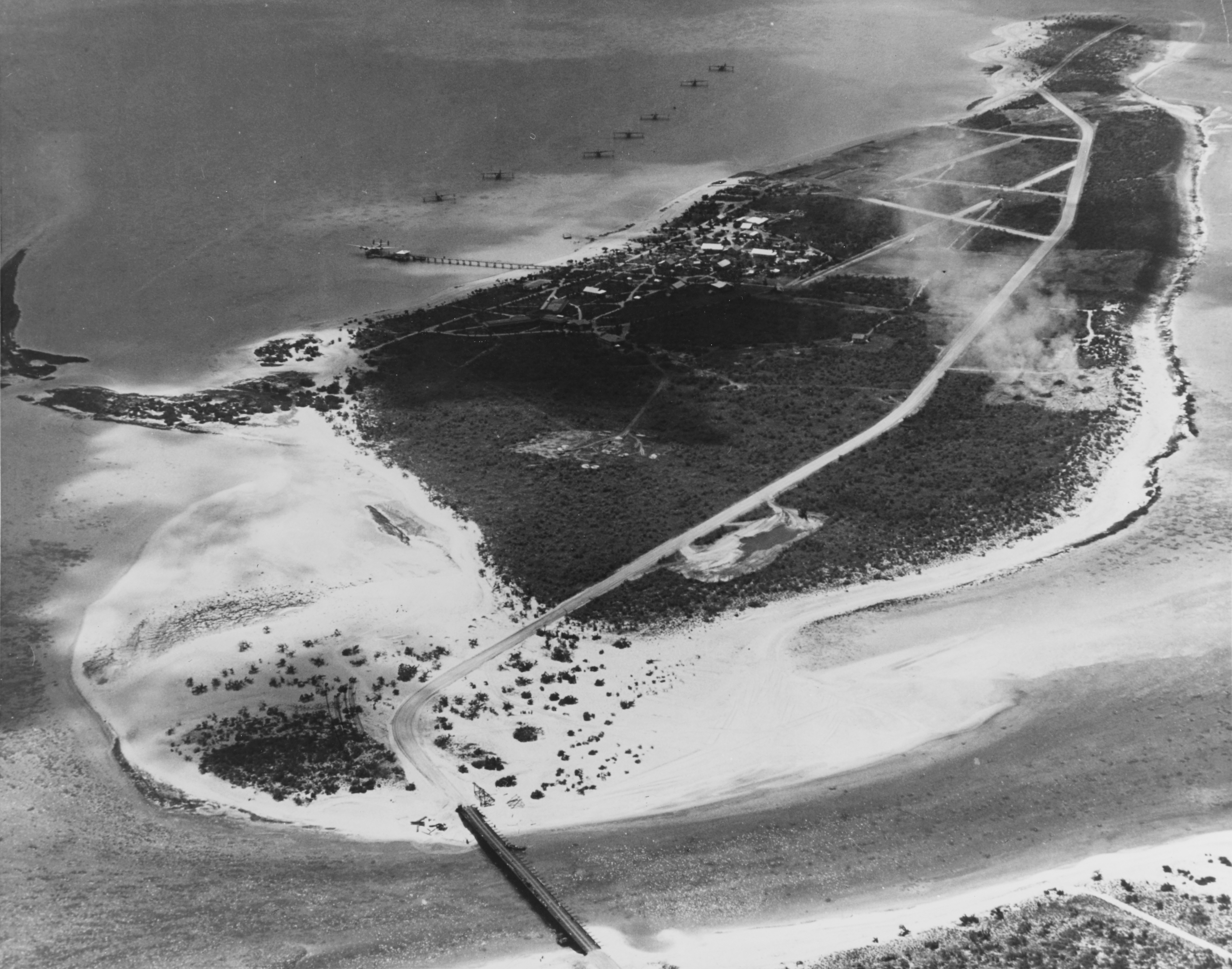
Peale islet in May 1941: The bridge across the channel goes to the rest of Wake. The Pan-American buildings, pier into the lagoon, and seaplanes are seen.

In January 1941, the United States Navy began constructing a military base on the atoll. On February 14, 1941, President Franklin D. Roosevelt issued Executive Order 8682 to create naval defense areas in the central Pacific territories. The proclamation established the "Wake Island Naval Defensive Sea Area", encompassing the territorial waters between the extreme high-water marks and the three-mile marine boundaries surrounding Wake. "Wake Island Naval Airspace Reservation" was also established to restrict access to the airspace over the naval defense sea area. Only U.S. government ships and aircraft were permitted to enter the naval defense areas at Wake Island unless authorized by the Secretary of the Navy.

Seven months later, on August 19, despite the fact that construction on the base was not yet finished, the first permanent military garrison arrived, consisting of elements of the U.S. Marine Corps' First Marine Defense Battalion, totaling 449 officers and men, commanded by Navy Cmdr. Winfield Scott Cunningham. Also on the island were 68 U.S. Naval personnel and about 1,221 civilian workers from the American firm Morrison-Knudsen Corp.

In November 1941, Marine Fighter Squadron 221 (VMF-211) embarked with 12 of its 24 F4F-3 Wildcats and 13 of its 29 pilots aboard USS Enterprise for transit to Wake Island. The Wildcats launched from the carrier and arriving at Wake on December 3.

== World War II ==
On December 7, 1941, (December 6 in Hawaii on the other side of the International Date Line), one of Pan-Am's Martin M-130s, the Philippine Clipper, flew in from Midway and landed at Wake to refuel before continuing on to Guam. The next morning, December 8, (December 7 in Hawaii) it took off, but the pilot was radioed by the Wake naval base about the Japanese surprise attack on Pearl Harbor that had just occurred. The Pan-Am flight returned to Wake, disembarked the passengers, and refueled, planning to do a marine search for Japanese ships. But while it was still on the ground, at least 27 Japanese Mitsubishi G3M "Nell" medium bombers flown from bases on Kwajalein in the Marshall Islands bombed Wake Island, destroying eight of the twelve Wildcat fighters on the ground, but leaving the Marine garrison's defensive emplacements largely intact.

The Philippine Clipper took some light damage during the raid, and two of its air crew were wounded. The pilot quickly made the decision to evacuate as many Pan-Am employees and passengers as possible, and the Clipper was quickly stripped of seats and spare weight. Two hours after the raid, the overloaded Clipper, carrying passengers and 26 Pan-Am employees, took three attempts to take off before climbing into the air. It left in such a hurry that 1 passenger, 1 Pan-Am employee, and 35 Guam staff were left behind. The Clipper made its way to Midway, and from there went to Pearl Harbor, and then back to the U.S.

Left on Wake were about 500 Marines and 1100 civilian contractors. The military base was still not completed, and work continued even during the Battle of Wake. The incomplete hangars and bunkers would make repairing damaged aircraft difficult in the coming battle.

=== Battle of Wake Island ===
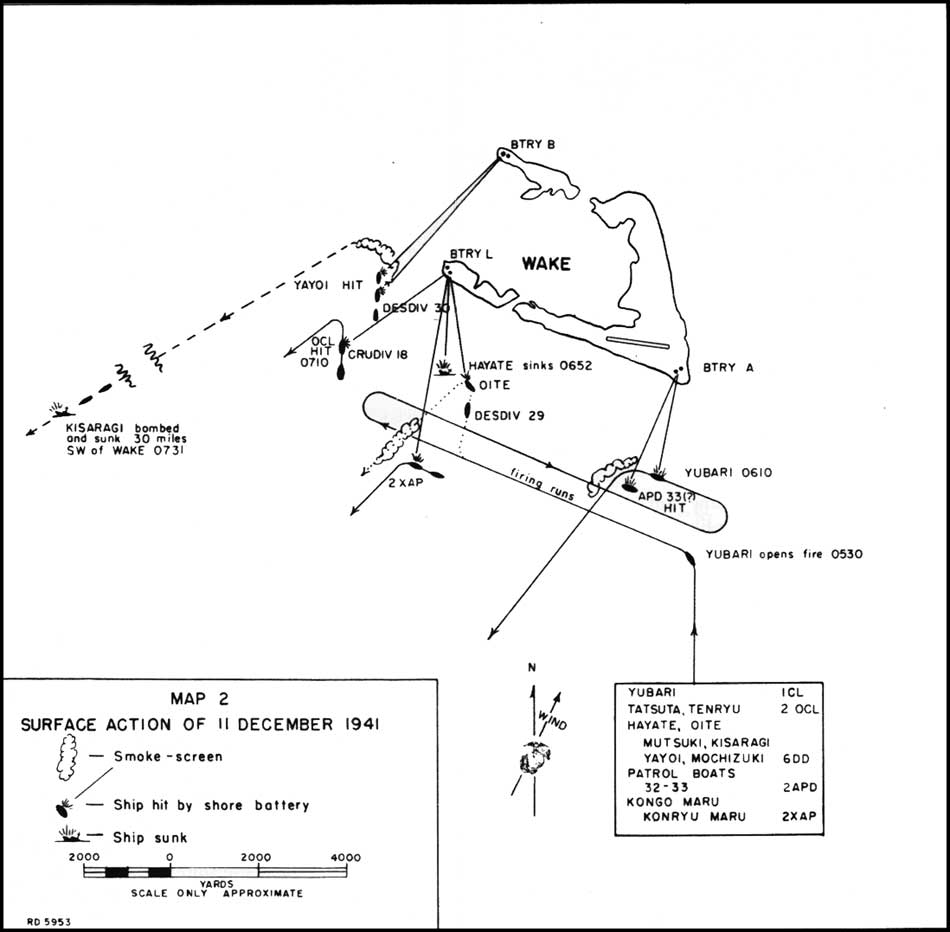
Diagram of the December 11 battle at Wake

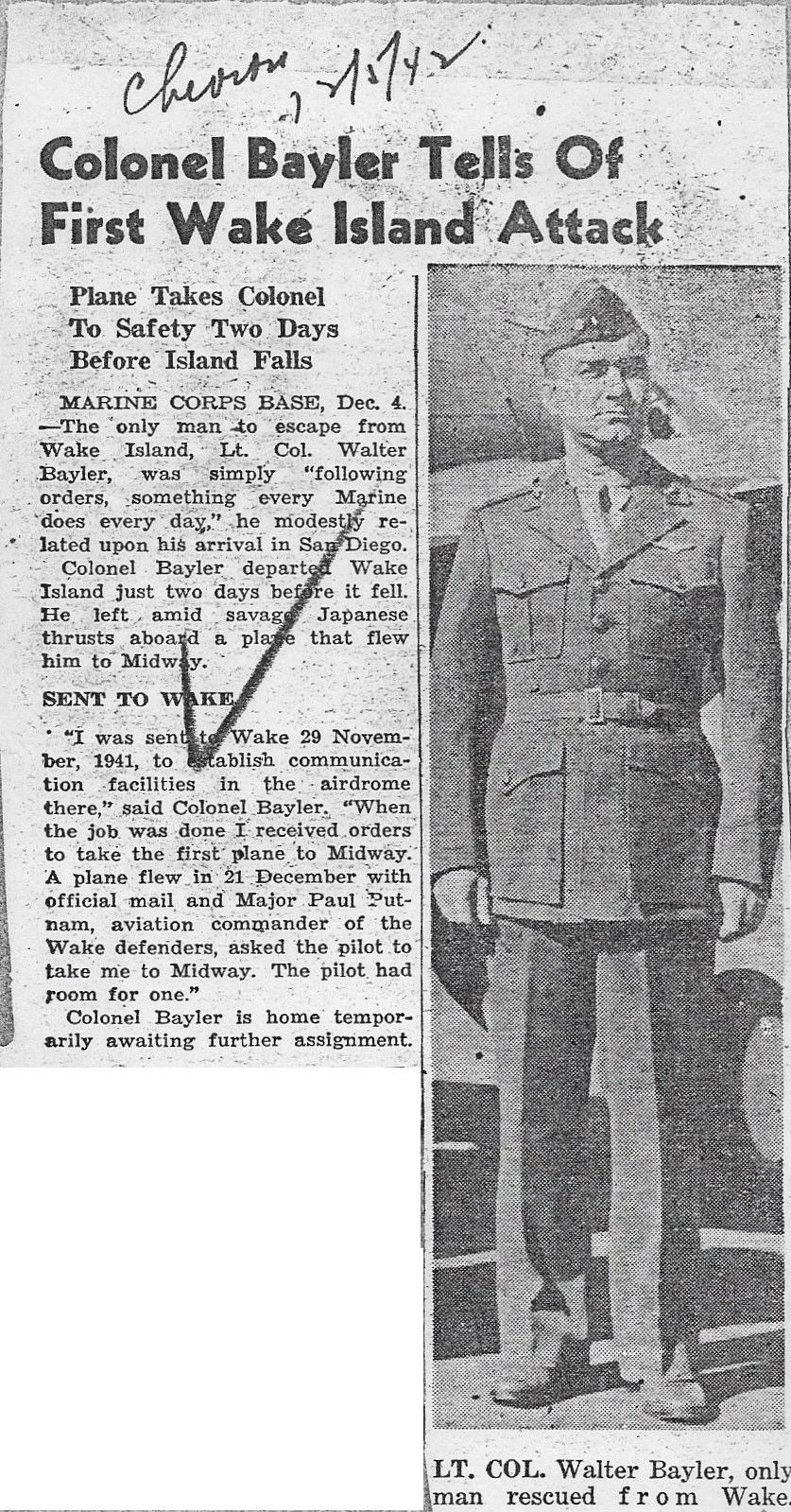
A clipping of an American newspaper article on Bayler

On December 9 and 10, there were more air raids, and two Japanese bombers were shot down. However, the bombing of Wilkes Island detonated an ammunition dump, the Wake hospital was destroyed, and many other buildings were damaged. On the night of December 10, the US submarine USS Triton engaged an enemy destroyer near Wake while on patrol; it fired torpedoes, but in the battle neither vessel was sunk. This was the first time a U.S. submarine launched its torpedoes in the Pacific war.

A Japanese amphibious landing force from Roi arrived on December 11, 1941. The American garrison, supplemented by a few civilian construction workers employed by Morrison-Knudsen Corp., repelled one Japanese landing attempt.

An American journalist reported that after the initial Japanese amphibious assault was beaten back with heavy losses on December 11, the American commander was asked by his superiors if he needed anything. Popular legend has it that Major James Devereux sent back the message, "Send us more Japs!" – a reply that became famous. After the war, when Major Devereux learned that he had been credited with sending such a message, he pointed out that he had not been the commander on Wake Island and denied sending it. "As far as I know, it wasn't sent at all. None of us was that much of a damn fool. We already had more Japs than we could handle."

In reality, Commander Winfield S. Cunningham, USN, was in charge of Wake Island, not Devereux. Cunningham had ordered that coded messages be sent during operations. A junior officer had added "send us" and "more Japs" to the beginning and end of a message to confuse Japanese code breakers. This was put together at Pearl Harbor and passed on as part of the message.

On December 12, in the early morning, a four-engined flying boat bombed Wake, but a Wildcat fighter aircraft was able to intercept and shot it down. Later in the day, Wake was bombed again by 26 Nell aircraft (G3M twin-engine bombers), one of which was shot down by anti-aircraft fire. An F4F Wildcat on patrol late in the day sank a Japanese submarine that was near Wake. The next air raid was on December 14, which included a bombing raid by several 4-engined flying boats, and later in the day, 30 Nells struck the atoll, destroying a Wildcat that was under repair. The island was bombed again on December 15, killing one civilian worker, again on December 16, and again on the 19th, although in that attack one was shot down by anti-aircraft fire and several more damaged.

Incongruously, in the middle of the battle on December 20, a PBY Catalina flying boat arrived with mail delivery. It left the same day with Major Walter L. J. Bayler on board because he was required on Midway; he was the last person to leave Wake Island before its loss.

On December 21, 49 aircraft from a Japanese carrier group attacked Wake, and the Japanese launched a final assault, overcoming American resistance. On the day the island fell, a US Naval force was one day away from resupplying the base, but was forced to turn back.

After the end of fighting, American and Japanese dead were buried on the island.

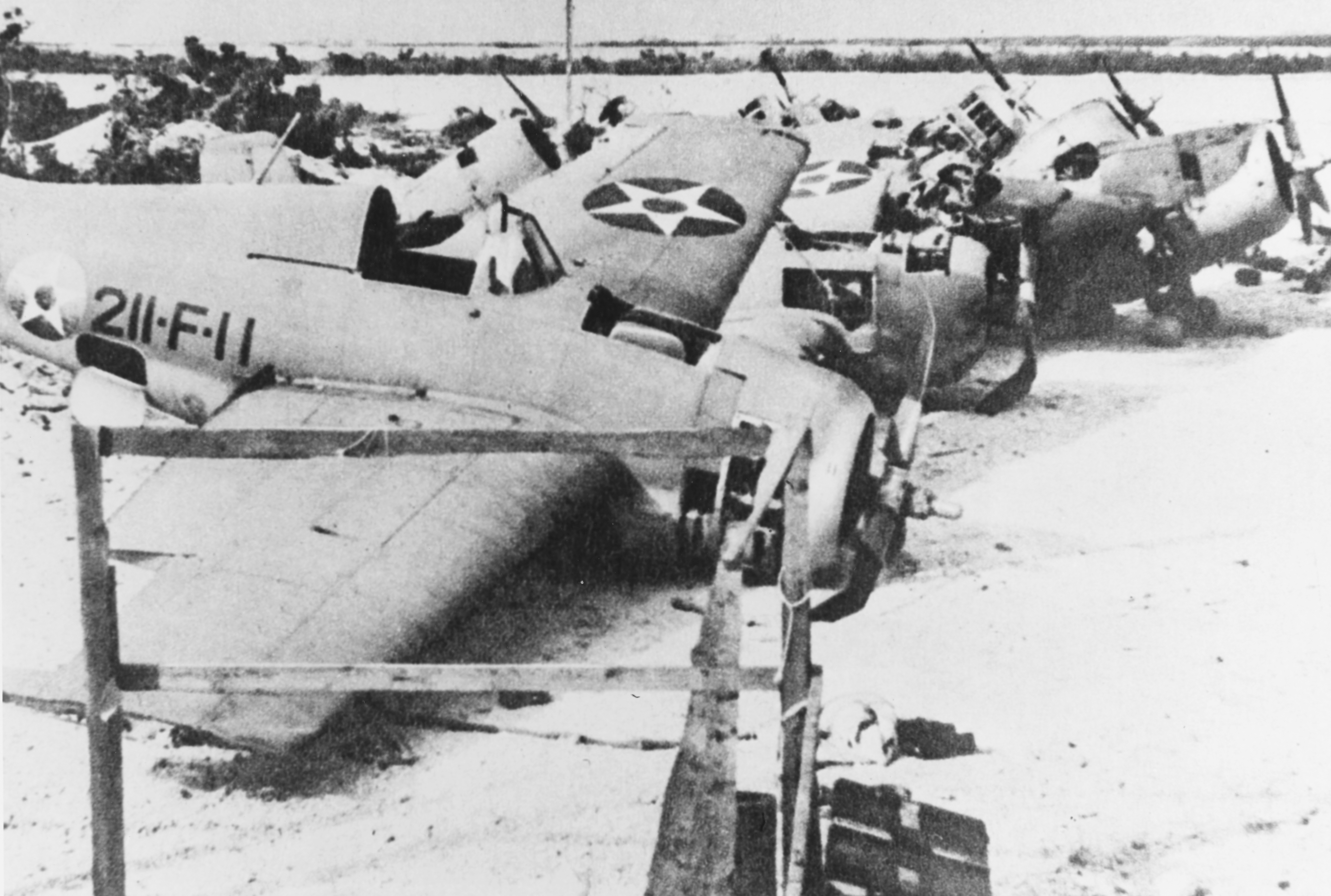
Wreckage of Wildcats on Wake after the battle

The Japanese took about 1,600 people prisoner: 460 American soldiers and 1,150 civilians. Three weeks later, most of the prisoners were transported to Japanese prisoner-of-war camps in Asia aboard the Japanese aircraft carrier Nita Maru (later renamed Chūyō). Some who were left behind were too badly wounded to move, and some were civilian contractors.

=== Japanese occupation ===
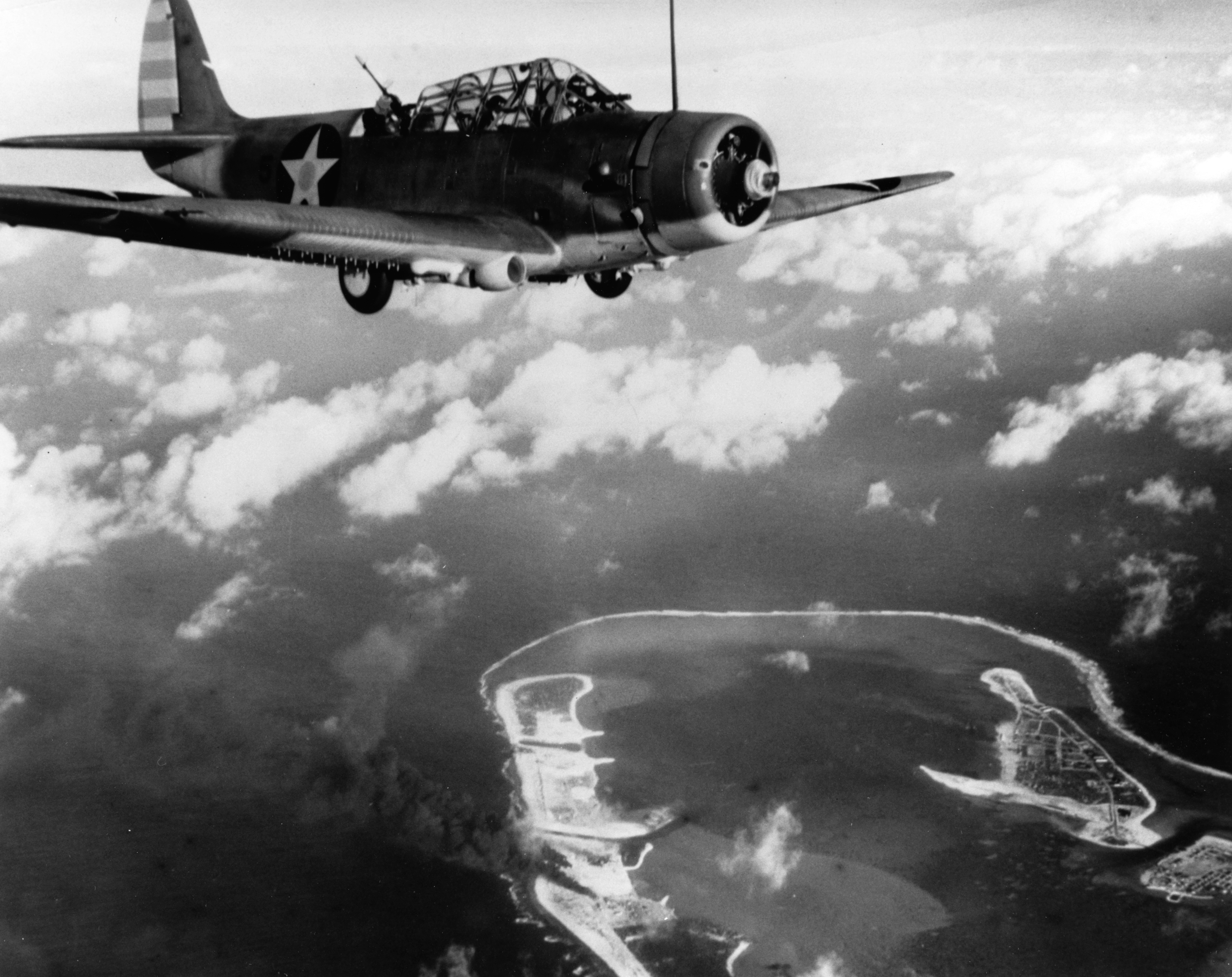
A US TBD-1 flies by Wake Island in February 1942.

The island's Japanese garrison was composed of the IJN 65th Guard Unit (2,000 men), Japan Navy Captain Shigematsu Sakaibara and the IJA units, which became the 13th Independent Mixed Regiment (1,939 men) under the command of Col. Shigeji Chikamori.

Fearing an imminent American attack, the Japanese reinforced Wake Island with more formidable defenses. The American captives were ordered to build a series of bunkers and fortifications on Wake. The Japanese brought in an 8-inch (200 mm) naval gun to fend off American ships. But instead of attacking, the U.S. Navy established a submarine blockade instead. The Japanese-occupied island (called Ōtorishima (大鳥島) or Big Bird Island by them for its birdlike shape) was bombed several times by American aircraft; one of these raids was the first mission for future United States President George H. W. Bush.

American aircraft also dropped leaflets and even small rubber rafts, hoping an American could escape from the island by sea.

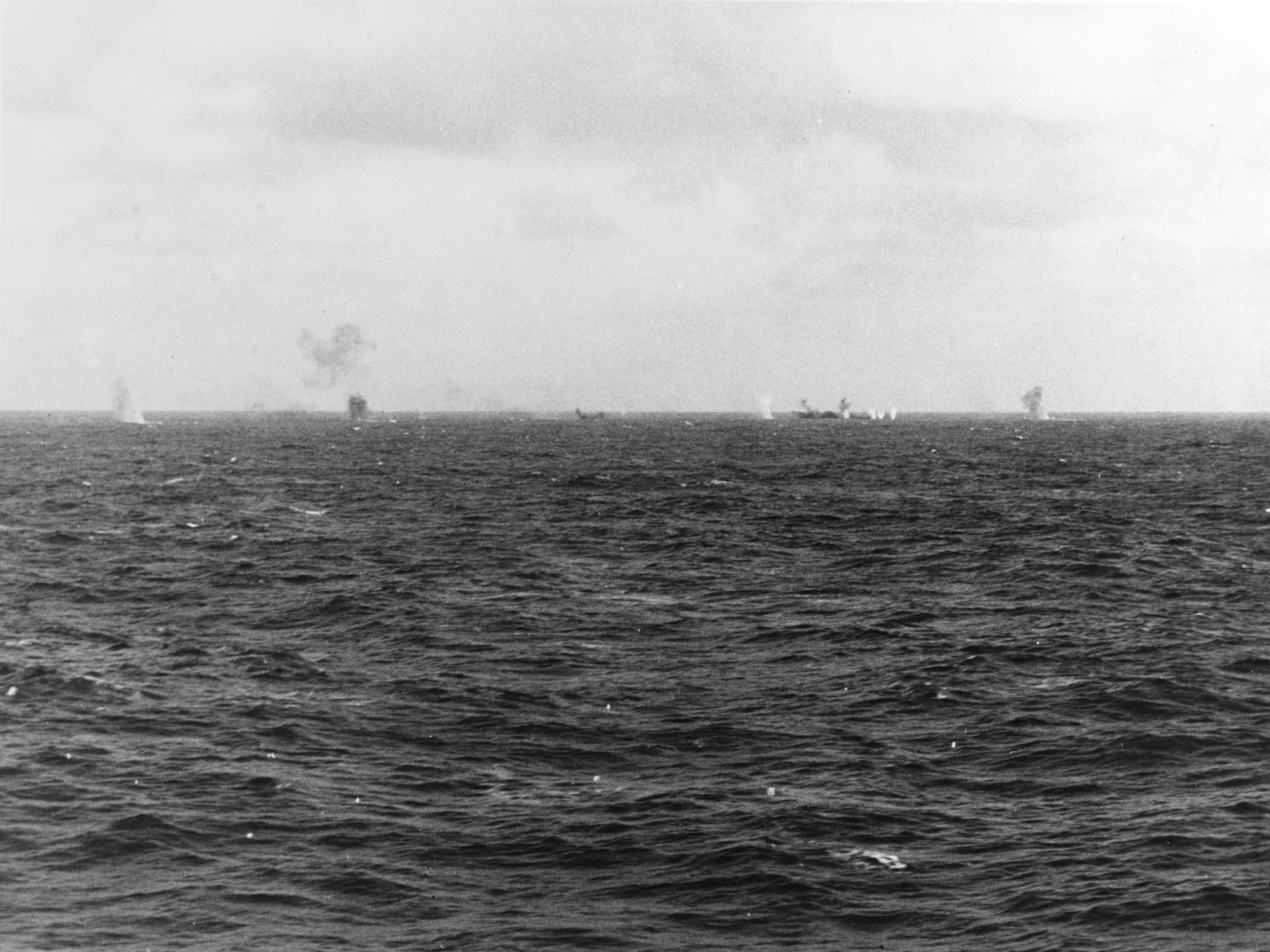
A Japanese patrol boat under fire from a US destroyer near Wake Island during the raid in February 1942

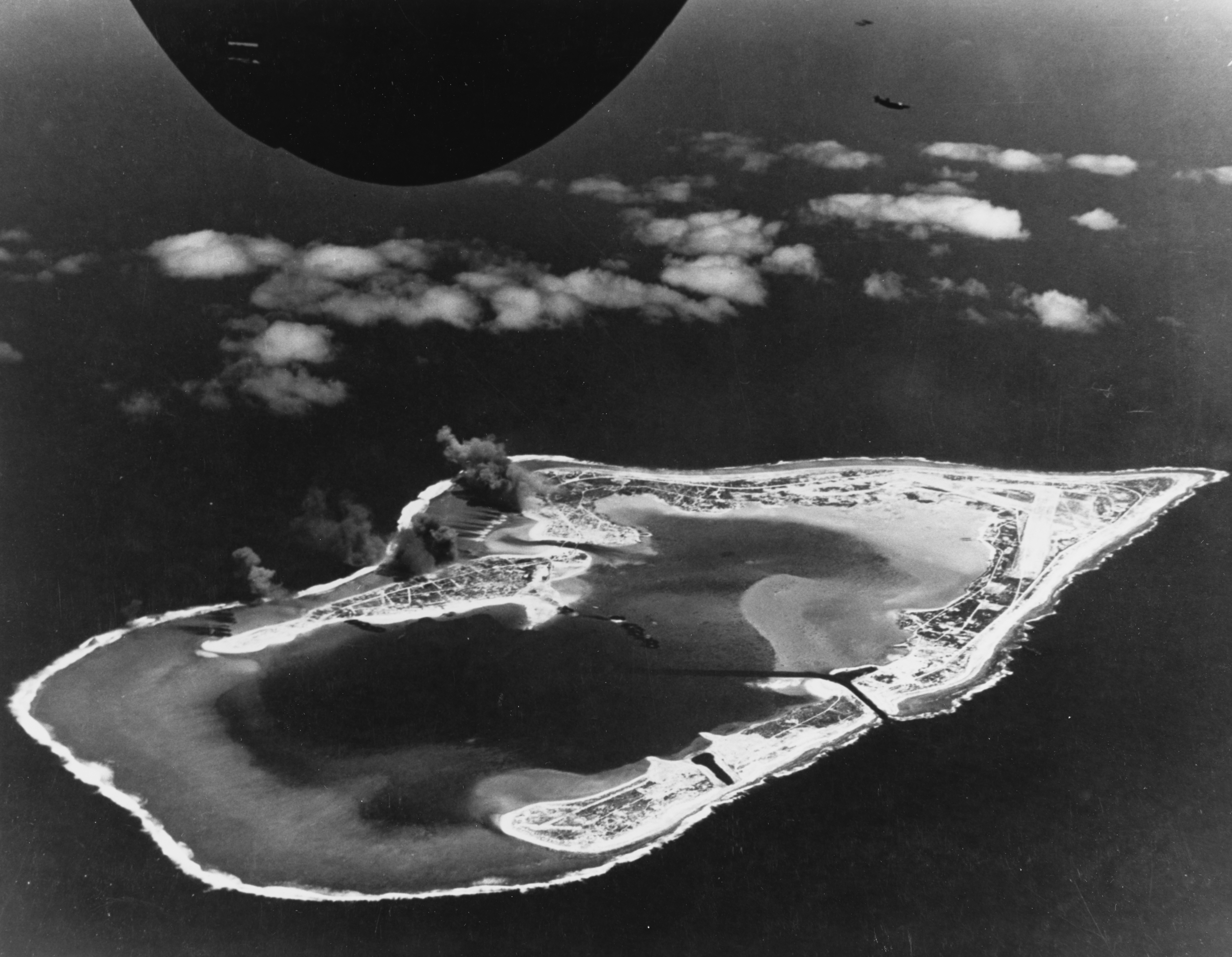
Wake bombed on March 23, 1944, by B-24

American air raids continued in order to reduce the danger of Wake being used by the Japanese as a launching point for a strike on Midway. From June 1942 to July 1943, many American B-24 raids and photographic recon missions were launched from Midway to Wake, often resulting in air battles between Japanese Zeros and bombers. In 1944, Wake Island was bombed by PB2Y Coronado flying boats operating from Midway in order to stop the Japanese garrison from supporting the battle for the Marshall Islands. Once the Americans took Kwajalein Atoll, American B-24s used it as a base to conduct even more raids, which continued until October 1944. After that, Wake was only bombed a few more times, usually by carrier strike groups that were heading west towards Japan.

=== Prisoners of war ===
On May 10, 1942, one prisoner was executed for breaking into a store and getting drunk, and in September 1942, 265 POWs were transported off the island, leaving 98 POWs. One was executed in July 1943.

After a successful American air raid on October 5, 1943, Commander Sakaibara ordered the execution of the remaining 97 POWs. They were taken to the northern end of the island, blindfolded and machine-gunned. One prisoner escaped, carving the message "98 US PW 5-10-43" on a large coral rock near where the victims had been hastily buried in a mass grave. This unknown American was soon recaptured and beheaded. The one that had escaped created an issue for the Japanese, who had already buried the bodies at the end of the runway under coral sand. They then had to dig up and count all the bodies, confirming that one was missing. This would not be the final resting place; near the end of the war, in August 1945, the bodies were again dug up and reburied at Peacock Point in a mass grave but with multiple wooden crosses. After the war, they were exhumed again and buried at the U.S. National Cemetery of the Pacific.

=== End of the war ===
In January 1944, the Japanese-held island to the south of Wake that had been resupplying the Wake garrison was captured, cutting Wake off from resupply. In May 1944, the Japanese garrison began rationing food, and the rationing became progressively stricter. To survive, the garrison engaged in fishing, growing vegetables, collecting bird eggs, and capturing rats. Sometimes tens of thousands of rats were killed in a single day to stave off starvation.

While the islands' sooty tern colony had received some protection as a source of eggs, the Wake Island rail was hunted to extinction by the starving soldiers. Ultimately, about three-quarters of the Japanese garrison perished, and the rest survived only by eating tern eggs, rats, and what scant number of vegetables they could grow in makeshift gardens among the coral rubble.

In June 1945, the Japanese hospital ship Takasago Maru was allowed to stop at Wake Island, and it departed with 974 patients. On the way to Wake, it was stopped by the USS Murray (DD-576) and on the way back from Wake it was stopped by the USS McDermut II (DD-677) to confirm it was carrying the patients. The condition was recorded first hand by the USS McDermut II, which reported that about 15% of the troops that the Japanese evacuated were extremely sick.

When the war ended in August 1945, about 300 POWs who had been evacuated from Wake early in the war were liberated from Hirahata Camp 12-B.

=== Surrender and trial ===
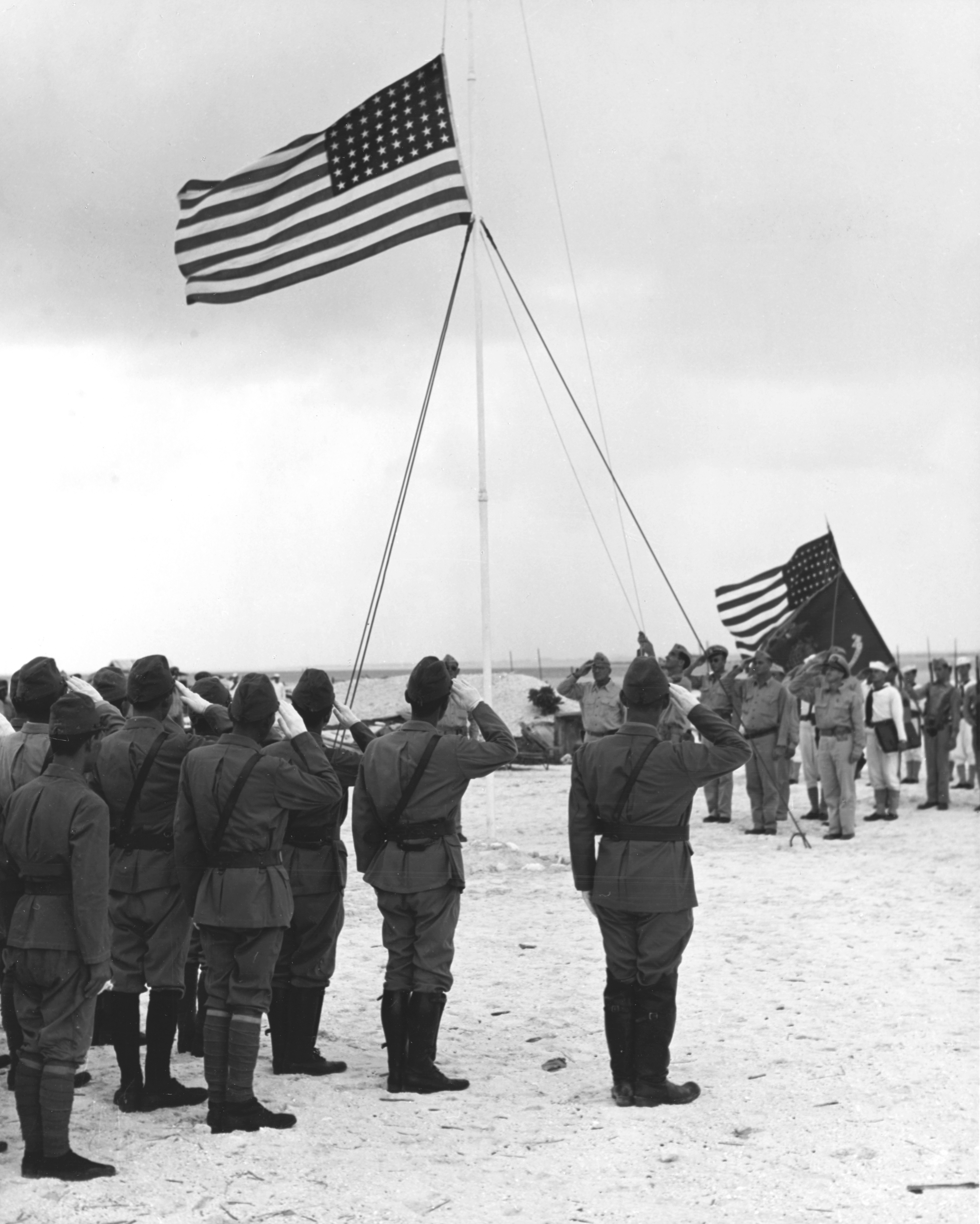
The formal surrender of the Japanese garrison on Wake Island, September 7, 1945. Island commander Admiral Shigematsu Sakaibara is the Japanese officer in the right-foreground.

On September 4, 1945, the Japanese garrison surrendered to a detachment of United States Marines under the command of Brigadier General Lawson H. M. Sanderson. The garrison, having previously received news that Imperial Japan's defeat was imminent, exhumed the mass grave. The bones were moved to the U.S. cemetery established on Peacock Point after the invasion. Wooden crosses were erected in preparation for the expected arrival of U.S. forces. At the handover of Wake, 2,200 Japanese surrendered; hundreds had died during bombing raids and from starvation, and many survivors were sick with tuberculosis.

During the initial interrogations, the Japanese claimed that an American bombing raid mostly killed the remaining 98 Americans on the island. However, some escaped and fought to the death after being cornered on the beach at the north end of Wake Island. Several Japanese officers in American custody committed suicide over the incident, leaving written statements that incriminated Sakaibara. Sakaibara and his subordinate, lieutenant commander Tachibana, were later sentenced to death after conviction for this and other war crimes. Sakaibara was executed by hanging in Guam on June 18, 1947, while Tachibana's sentence was commuted to life in prison. The remains of the murdered civilians were exhumed and reburied at Honolulu's National Memorial Cemetery of the Pacific at section G, commonly known as Punchbowl Crater.

Wake, the bodies of the American soldiers who had died during the battle for the island as well as those who had been murdered were eventually exhumed to try to make identifications. The task proved too difficult, and they were buried as a group with a memorial listing the names in 1953.

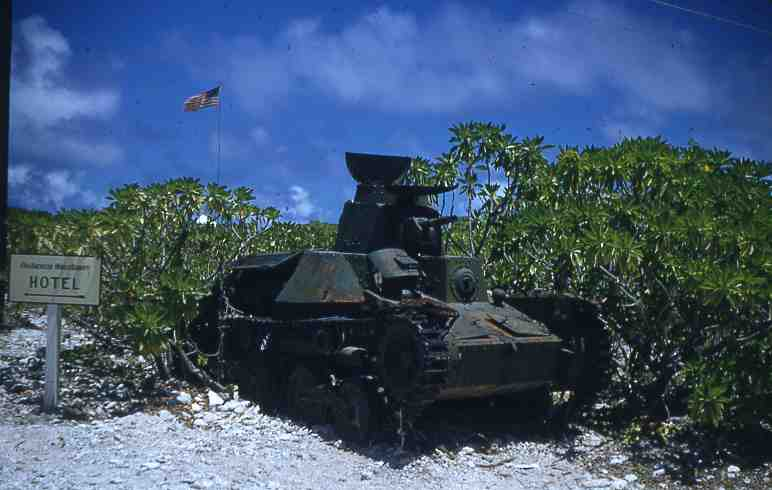
A derelict Japanese tank after World War II

=== Post-World War II military and commercial airfield ===
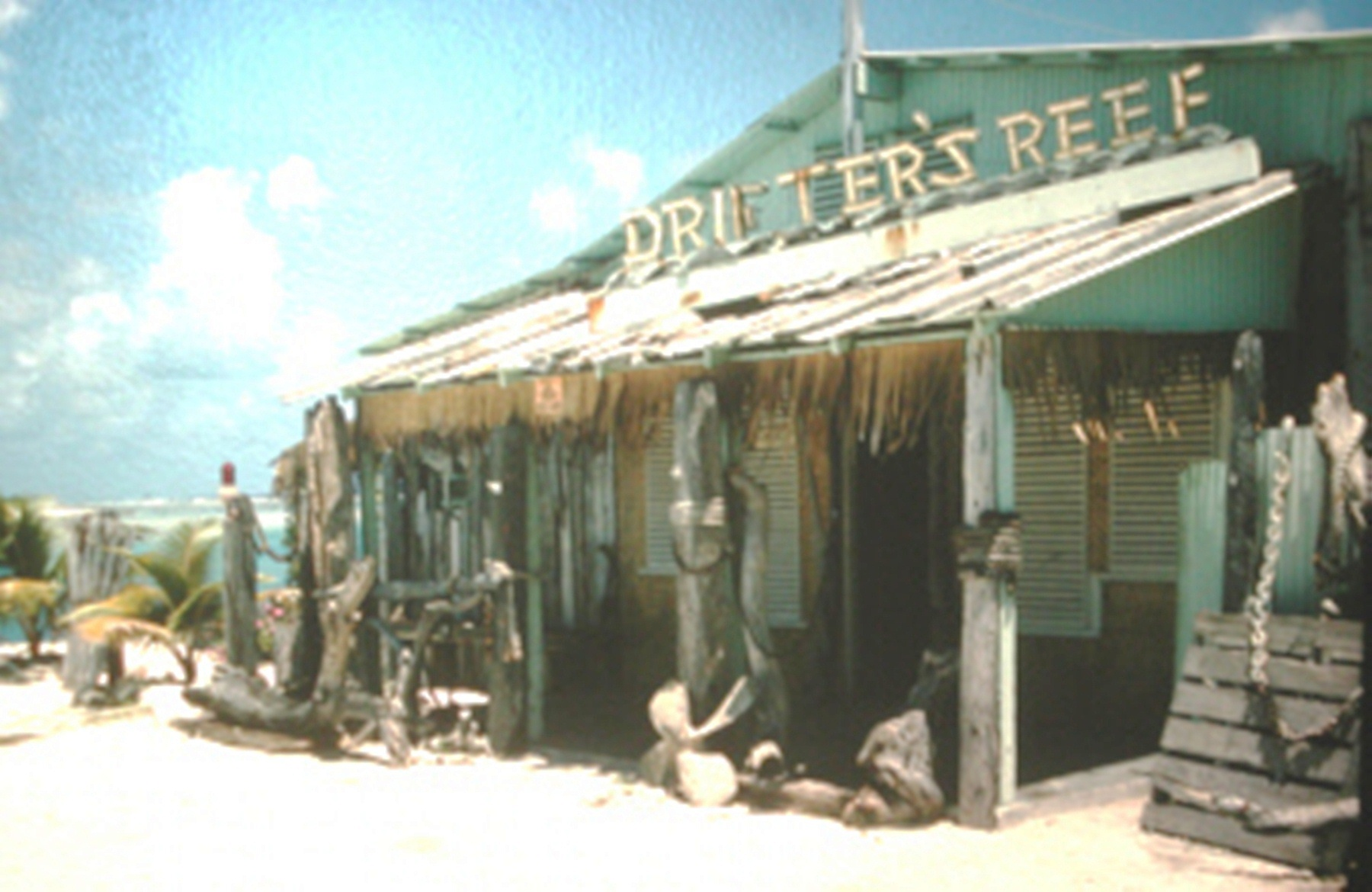
The original Drifter's Reef bar, built near the harbor area at Wake Island, opened its doors to aircrews, visitors and other "drifters" on November 8, 1949.

With the end of World War II and the increase in international air travel driven partly by wartime advances in aeronautics, Wake Island became a critical mid-Pacific base for the servicing and refueling of military and commercial aircraft. The United States Navy resumed control of the island, and in October 1945, 400 Seabees from the 85th Naval Construction Battalion arrived at Wake to clear the island of the effects of the war and to build basic facilities for a Naval Air Base, including a runway made of crushed coral. The base was completed in March 1946, and six months later, Pan Am resumed regular commercial passenger service. The era of the flying boats was nearly over, so Pan Am switched to longer-range, faster, and more profitable airplanes that could land on Wake's new coral runway. Other airlines that established transpacific routes through Wake included British Overseas Airways Corporation (BOAC), Japan Airlines, Philippine Airlines and Transocean Air Lines. Due to the substantial increase in the number of commercial flights, on July 1, 1947, the Navy transferred administration, operations, and maintenance of the facilities at Wake to the Civil Aeronautics Administration (CAA). In 1949, the CAA upgraded the runway by paving over the coral surface and extending its length to 7,000 feet. Previously Pan Am was still operating the airport at Wake.

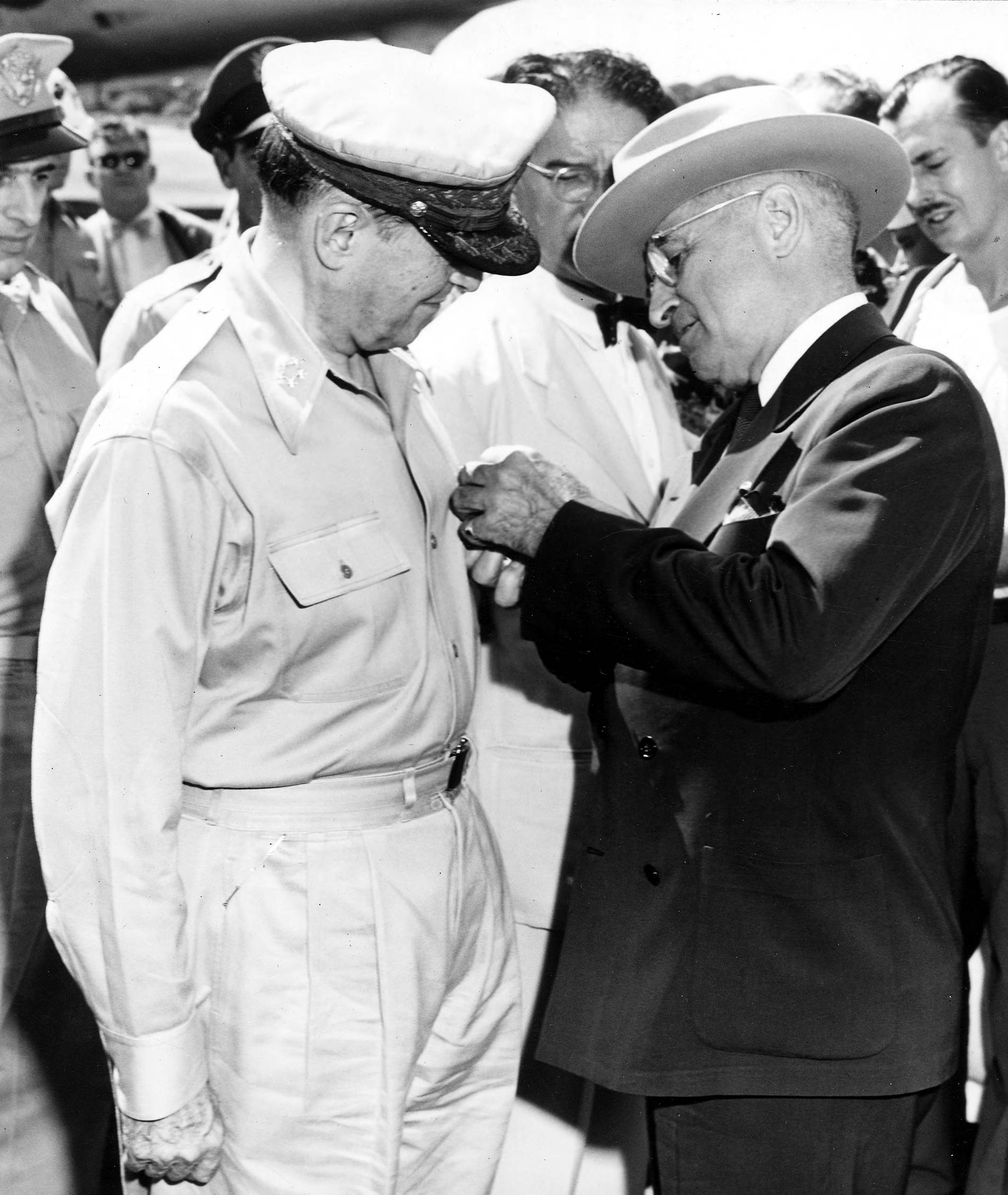
President Harry S. Truman awards the Distinguished Service Medal, Fourth Oak Leaf Cluster, to General Douglas MacArthur during the Wake Island Conference in 1950.

In July 1950, the Korean Airlift started, and the Military Air Transport Service (MATS) used the airfield and facilities at Wake as an essential mid-Pacific refueling stop for its mission of transporting men and supplies to the Korean War. By September, 120 military aircraft were landing at Wake per day. On October 15, U.S. President Harry S. Truman and General MacArthur met at the Wake Island Conference to discuss progress and war strategy for the Korean Peninsula. They chose to meet at Wake Island because of its proximity to Korea so that MacArthur would not have to be away from the war for long.

In September 1952, Typhoon Olive struck, causing 750 people to shelter in World War II bunkers as the island was battered with 150 mph winds. Damage was severe; it is estimated that 85% of the island's structures were demolished due to the storm. All of the homes and the island's hotel were destroyed. Additionally, the island's chapel and Quonset huts were destroyed. The island's LORAN station, operated by the United States Coast Guard, was also damaged. On September 18, 1952 water and power services were restored. The facilities on the island were fully restored in 1953. The total cost to repair damages caused by Olive amounted to $1.6 million (1952 USD; $13 million 2009 USD). Four injuries were reported, but no fatalities occurred. In 1953, the bridge between Peale and Wake Island was rebuilt.

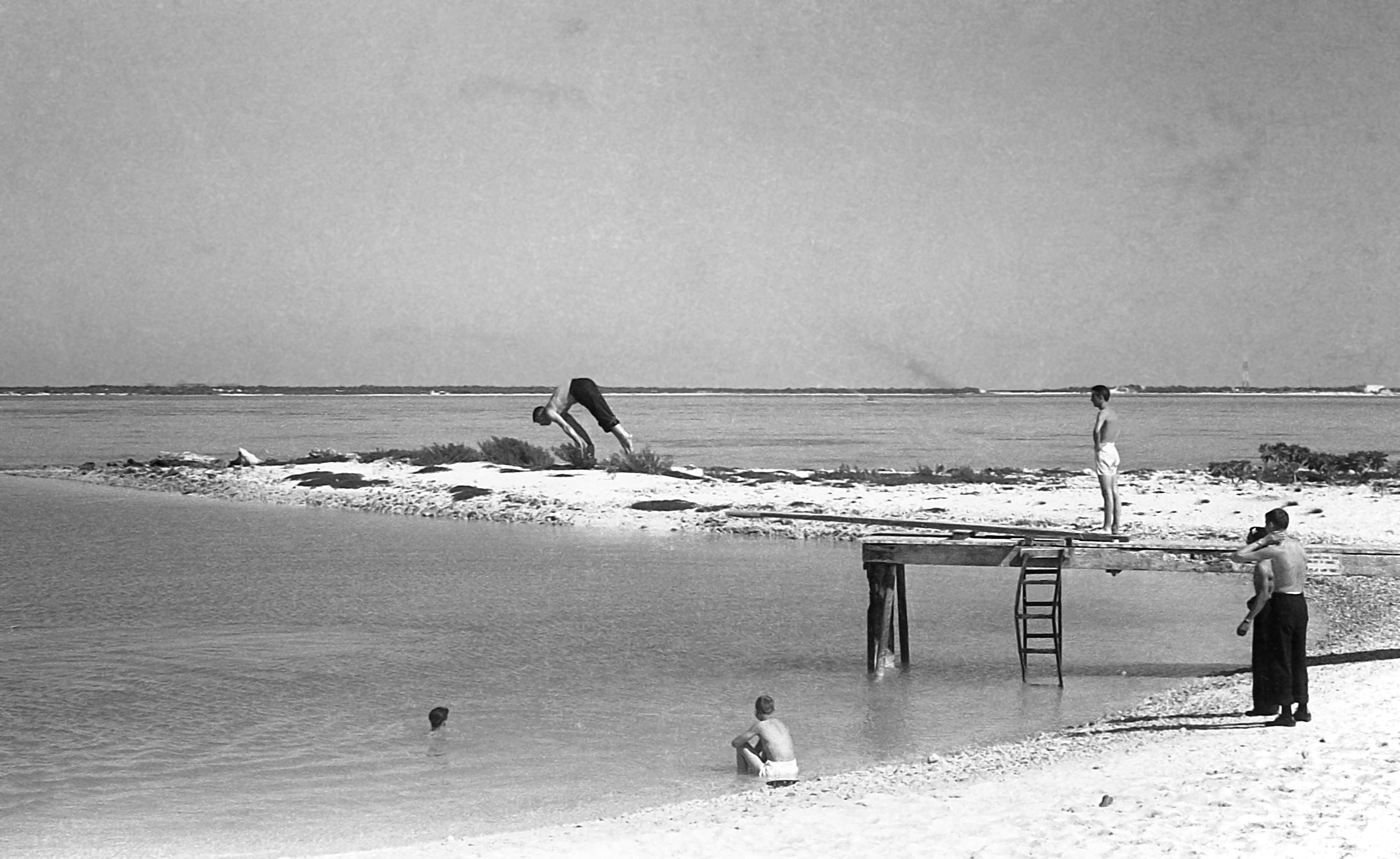
Off-duty sailors take a break in the Wake Island lagoon, 1954

The U.S. Coast Guard Loran station, which had a staff of about ten people, operated from 1950 to 1978, with facilities rebuilt on Peale Island by 1958.

==== Wake in the late 1950s ====
Sherry Waterman, a Transocean (and former American Airlines) flight attendant who was stationed on Wake, sketched the island as of the late 1950s as part of a memoir written soon after she stopped flying in 1959. She enjoyed her time there, but said others hated it intensely. The population was just less than 1000 people, of whom about 300 were Filipino. There were about 80 children, all under 14 as older children attended school elsewhere, and fewer than 100 women, almost all married.

- Over half the residents were connected to Pan Am and Transocean.
- Outside of the airlines, the biggest groups were those who worked for the Federal Aviation Agency, the Navy, Air Force, Standard Oil or others related to supplying the island.

Most flight attendants were unmarried women and lived in a residence called the Iron Girdle, because it was originally fenced with pierced steel planking. There was a population of short-legged dogs. War wreckage was still prevalent. There were a constant flow of transit passengers, including VIPs. There was a nine-hole (six at high tide) golf club, a motorcycle club, a flying club (with a single-engined plane that flew a circuit that never took them out of sight of Wake), an open-air movie theater, a tape-driven radio-station (WAKE) and a small library. Liquor and "exotic" goods like Kobe beef were inexpensive but fresh food difficult to obtain and the fresh water was rusty from distillers. There was no phone service and newspapers were hard to come by, increasing the sense of isolation. Ham radio operators were the main form of instant communication, and teletypes were for the use of the airlines and officials only. Aircraft noise was constant.

==== Missile Impact Location System ====
From 1958 through 1960, the United States installed the Missile Impact Location System (MILS) in the Navy-managed Pacific Missile Range. Later, the Air Force managed Western Range to localize the splashdowns of test missile nose cones. MILS was developed and installed by the same entities that had completed the first phase of the Atlantic and U.S. West Coast SOSUS systems. A MILS installation, consisting of both a target array for precision location and a broad ocean area system for good positions outside the target area, was installed at Wake as part of the system supporting Intercontinental Ballistic Missile (ICBM) tests. Other Pacific MILS shore terminals were at the Marine Corps Air Station Kaneohe Bay supporting Intermediate Range Ballistic Missile (IRBM) tests with impact areas northeast of Hawaii and the other ICBM test support systems at Midway Island and Eniwetok.

==== Tanker shipwreck and oil spill ====
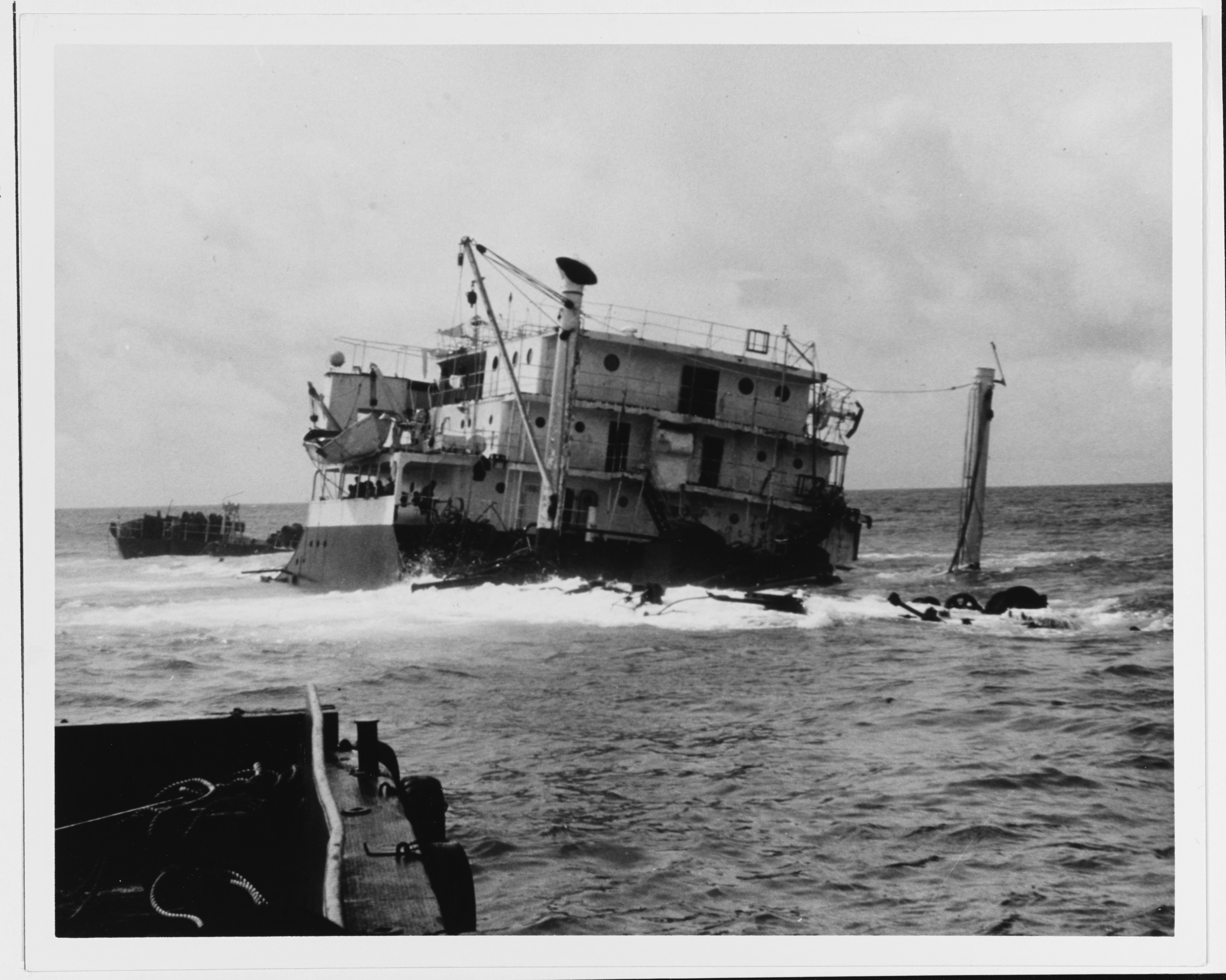
Wreck of the SS R.C. Stoner, 1967

On September 6, 1967, Standard Oil of California's 18,000-ton tanker SS R.C. Stoner was driven onto the reef at Wake Island by a strong southwesterly wind after the ship failed to moor to the two buoys near the harbor entrance. An estimated six million gallons of refined fuel oil – including 5.7 million gallons of aviation fuel, 168,000 gallons of diesel oil, and 138,600 gallons of bunker C fuel – spilled into the small boat harbor and along the southwestern coast of Wake Island to Peacock Point. The oil spill killed large numbers of fish; personnel from the FAA and crew members from the ship cleared the area closest to the spill of dead fish.

The U.S. Navy salvage team Harbor Clearance Unit Two and Pacific Fleet Salvage Officer Cmdr. John B. Orem flew to Wake to assess the situation. By September 13, the Navy tugs USS Mataco and USS Wandank, salvage ships USS Conserver and USS Grapple, tanker USS Noxubee, and USCGC Mallow, arrived from Honolulu, Guam and Subic Bay in the Philippines, to assist in the cleanup and removal of the vessel. The salvage team pumped and skimmed oil at the boat harbor, which they burned each evening in nearby pits. Recovery by the Navy salvage team of the R.C. Stoner and its remaining cargo, however, was hampered by strong winds and heavy seas.

On September 16, Super Typhoon Sarah made landfall on Wake Island at peak intensity with winds up to 145-knots, causing widespread damage. The storm's intensity significantly accelerated the cleanup effort by clearing the harbor and scouring the coast. However, oil remained embedded in the reef's flat crevices, impregnating the coral. The storm also had broken the wrecked vessel into three sections and, although delayed by rough seas and harassment by blacktip reef sharks, the salvage team used explosives to flatten and sink the remaining portions of the ship that were still above water.

=== U.S. military administration ===
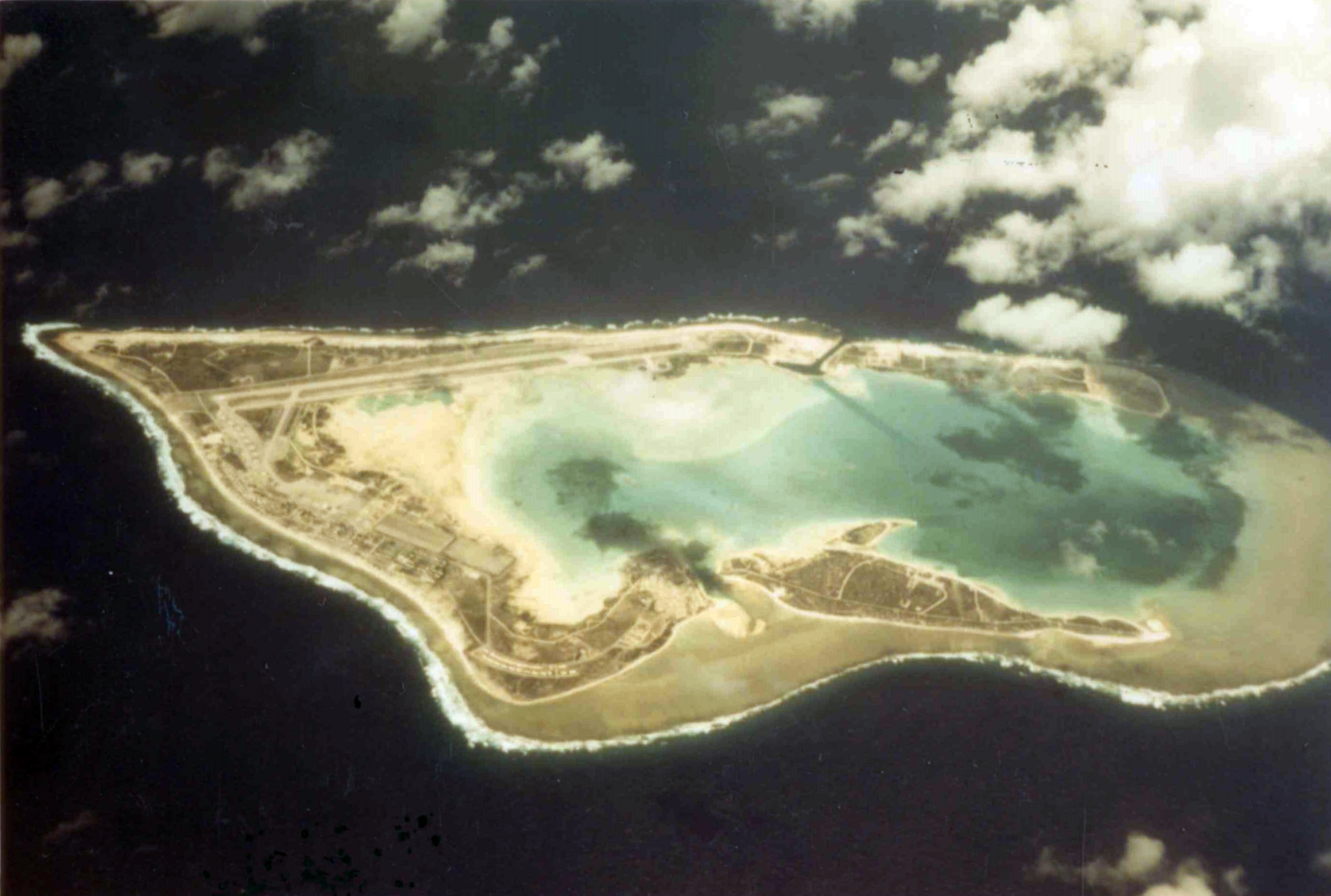
Wake Island, 1979

In the early 1970s, higher-efficiency jet aircraft with longer-range capabilities lessened the use of Wake Island Airfield as a refueling stop, and the number of commercial flights landing at Wake declined sharply. Pan Am had replaced many of its Boeing 707s with more efficient 747s, thus eliminating the need to continue weekly stops at Wake. Other airlines began to eliminate their scheduled flights into Wake. In June 1972, the last scheduled Pan Am passenger flight landed at Wake, and in July, Pan Am's last cargo flight departed the island, marking the end of the heyday of Wake Island's commercial aviation history. During this same period, the U.S. military had transitioned to longer-range C-5A and C-141 aircraft, leaving the C-130 as the only aircraft that would continue to use the island's airfield regularly. The steady decrease in air traffic control activities at Wake Island was apparent and was expected to continue.

On June 24, 1972, responsibility for the civil administration of Wake Island was transferred from the FAA to the United States Air Force under an agreement between the Secretary of the Interior and the Secretary of the Air Force. In July, the FAA turned over the administration of the island to the Military Airlift Command (MAC). However, legal ownership stayed with the Department of the Interior. The FAA continued maintaining air navigation facilities and providing air traffic control services. On December 27, the Chief of Staff of the Air Force (CSAF) General John D. Ryan directed MAC to phase out en-route support activity at Wake Island effective June 30, 1973. On July 1, 1973, all FAA activities ended, and the U.S. Air Force under Pacific Air Forces (PACAF), Detachment 4, 15th Air Base Wing assumed control of Wake Island.

In 1973, Wake Island was selected as a launch site for testing defensive systems against ICBMs under the U.S. Army's Project Have Mill. Air Force personnel on Wake and the Air Force Systems Command (AFSC) Space and Missile Systems Organization (SAMSO) provided support to the Army's Advanced Ballistic Missile Defense Agency (ABMDA). A missile launch complex was activated on Wake, and, from February 13 to June 22, 1974, seven Athena H missiles were launched from the island to the Roi-Namur Test Range at Kwajalein Atoll.

In 1973, Wake Island was claimed by what would become the Republic of the Marshall Islands, based on oral legends.

==== Vietnam War refugees: Operation New Life ====
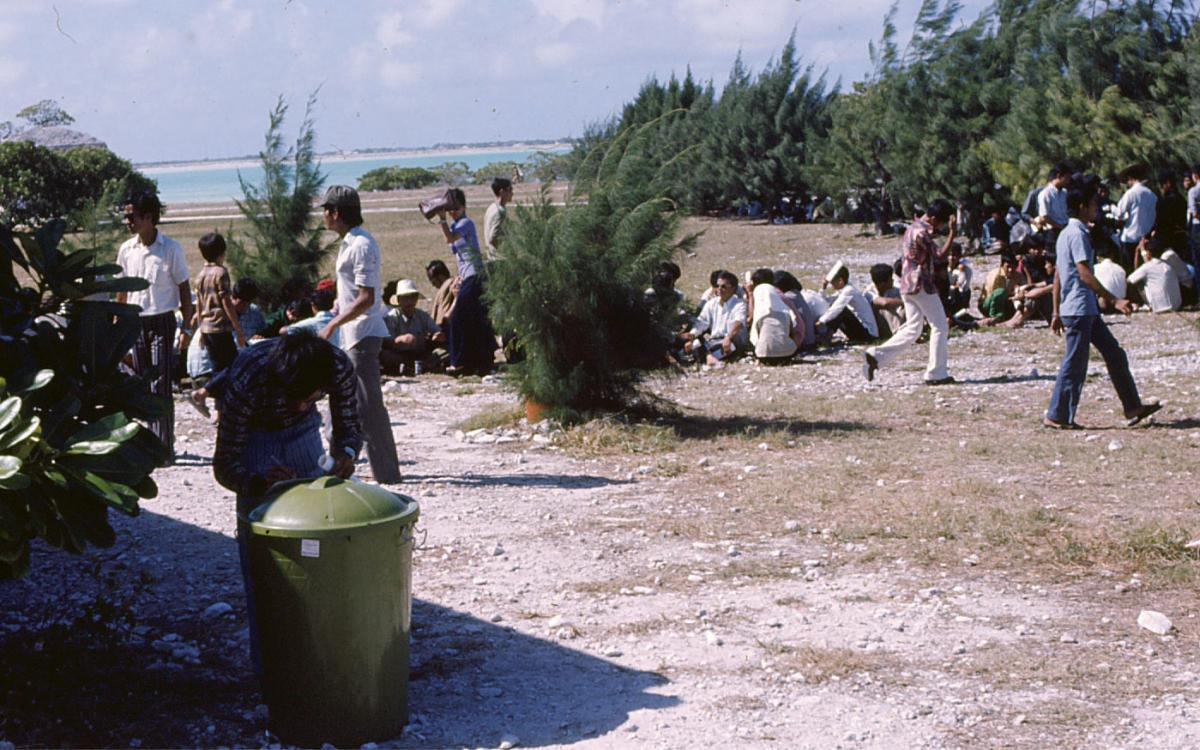
Vietnamese refugees on Wake Island await resettlement processing by U.S. Immigration and Naturalization Service personnel in May 1975.

In the spring of 1975, the population of Wake Island consisted of 251 military, government, and civilian contract personnel, whose primary mission was to maintain the airfield as a Mid-Pacific emergency runway. With the imminent fall of Saigon to North Vietnamese forces, President Gerald Ford ordered American forces to support Operation New Life, the evacuation of refugees from South Vietnam. The original plans included the Philippines' Subic Bay and Guam as refugee processing centers. Still, due to the high number of Vietnamese seeking evacuation, Wake Island was selected as an additional location.

The de facto flag of Wake Island was designed in 1976 by individuals stationed on the island to commemorate the United States Bicentennial. The three stars represent the three islands of the atoll, and the flag resembles the flag of the Philippines, as many workers on the island at the time were from the country.

In March 1975, Island Commander Major Bruce R. Hoon was contacted by PACAF and ordered to prepare Wake for its new mission as a refugee processing center where Vietnamese evacuees could be medically screened, interviewed, and transported to the United States or other resettlement countries. A 60-man civil engineering team was brought in to reopen boarded-up buildings and housing. Two complete MASH units arrived to set up field hospitals, and three Army field kitchens were deployed. A 60-man United States Air Force Security Police team, processing agents from the U.S. Immigration and Naturalization Service, and various other administrative and support personnel were also on Wake. Potable water, food, medical supplies, clothing, and other supplies were shipped in.

On April 26, 1975, the first C-141 carrying refugees arrived. The airlift to Wake continued at a rate of one C-141 every hour and 45 minutes, each aircraft with 283 refugees on board. At the peak of the mission, 8,700 Vietnamese refugees were on Wake. When the airlift ended on August 2, a total of about 15,000 refugees had been processed through Wake Island as part of Operation New Life.

==== Commemorative and memorial visits ====
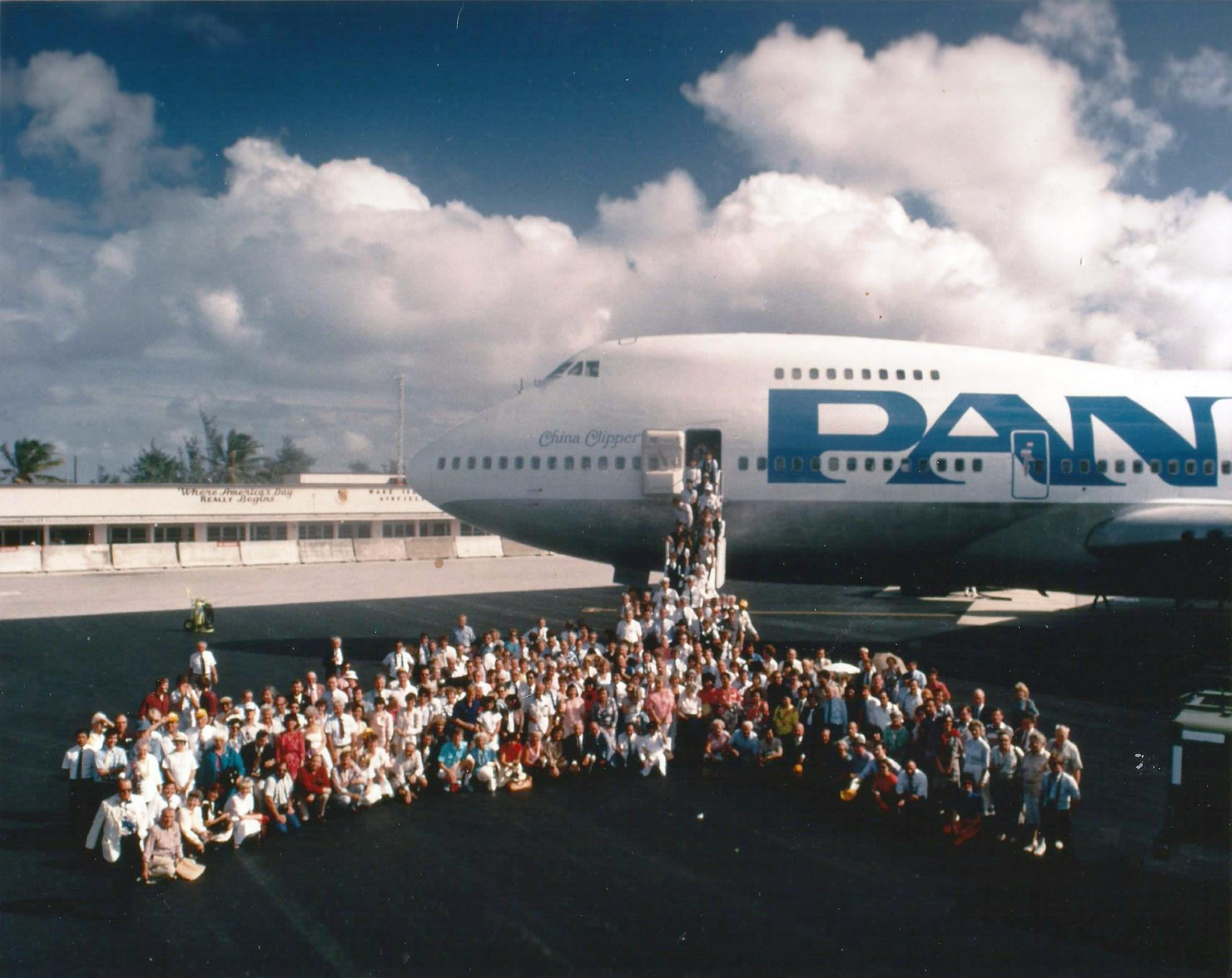
Passengers and crew of Pan Am's China Clipper II Boeing 747 at Wake Island during a 1985 trip across the Pacific to commemorate the 50th anniversary of the first China Clipper flight

In April 1981, a party of 19 Japanese, including 16 former Japanese soldiers who were at Wake during World War II, visited the island to pay respects for their war dead at the Japanese Shinto Shrine.

On November 3 and 4, 1985, a group of 167 former American prisoners of war (POWs) visited Wake with their wives and children. This was the first such visit by a group of former Wake Island POWs and their families.

On November 24, 1985, a Pan Am Boeing 747, renamed China Clipper II, came through Wake Island on a flight across the Pacific to commemorate the 50th anniversary of the inauguration of Pan American China Clipper Service to the Orient. Author James A. Michener and Lars Lindbergh, grandson of aviator Charles Lindbergh, were among the dignitaries on board the aircraft.

==== Army missile tests ====
Subsequently, the island has been used for strategic defense and operations during and after the Cold War, with Wake Island serving as a launch platform for military rockets involved in testing missile defense systems and atmospheric re-entry trials as part of the Ronald Reagan Ballistic Missile Defense Test Site. Wake's location allows for a safe launch and trajectory over the unpopulated ocean with open space for intercepts.

In 1987, Wake Island was selected as a missile launch site for a Strategic Defense Initiative (SDI) program named Project Starlab/Starbird. In 1989, the U.S. Army Strategic Defense Command (USASDC) constructed two launch pads on Peacock Point, as well as nearby support facilities, for the eight-ton, 60 feet (20 m), multi-stage Starbird test missiles. The program involved using electro-optical and laser systems mounted on the Starlab platform in the payload bay of an orbiting Space Shuttle to acquire, track, and target Starbird missiles launched from Cape Canaveral and Wake. After being impacted by mission scheduling delays caused by the explosion of the Space Shuttle Challenger, the program was canceled in late September 1990 to protect funding for another U.S. Army space-based missile defense program known as Brilliant Pebbles. Although no Starbird missiles were ever launched from Wake Island, the Starbird launch facilities at Wake were modified to support rocket launches for the Brilliant Pebbles program, with the first launch occurring on January 29, 1992. On October 16, a 30 feet (10 m) Castor-Orbus rocket was destroyed by ground controllers seven minutes after its launch from Wake. The program was canceled in 1993.

Missile testing activities continued with the Lightweight Exo-Atmospheric Projectile (LEAP) Test Program, another U.S. Army strategic defense project that included the launch of two Aerojet Super Chief HPB rockets from Wake Island. The first launch, on January 28, 1993, reached apogee at 240 miles (390 kilometers) and was a success. On February 11, the second launch reached apogee at 1.2 miles (1.9 kilometers) and was deemed a failure.

Due to the U.S. Army's continued use of the atoll for various missile testing programs, on October 1, 1994, the U.S. Army Space and Strategic Defense Command (USASSDC) assumed administrative command of Wake Island under a caretaker permit from the U.S. Air Force. The USASSDC had been operating on Wake since 1988 when the construction of the Starbird launch and support facilities started. Now under U.S. Army control, the island, which is located 690 miles (1,110 kilometers) north of Kwajalein Atoll, became a rocket launch site for the Kwajalein Missile Range known as the Wake Island Launch Center.

==== Operation Prompt Return ====
In July 1995, various units of the U.S. military established a camp on Wake Island to provide housing, food, medical care, and social activities for Chinese irregular immigrants as part of "Operation Prompt Return" (also known as "Joint Task Force Prompt Return"). The Chinese immigrants were discovered on July 3 on board MV Jung Sheng Number 8 when the 160-foot (49 m)-long vessel was interdicted by the U.S. Coast Guard south of Hawaii. Jung Sheng Number 8 had left Canton, China, en route to the United States on June 2 with 147 Chinese illegal immigrants, including 18 "enforcers", and 11 crew on board. On July 29, the Chinese were transported to Wake Island, where they were cared for by U.S. military personnel, and on August 7, they were safely repatriated to China by commercial air charter. From October 10 to November 21, 1996, military units assigned to "Operation Marathon Pacific" used facilities at Wake Island as a staging area for the repatriation of another group of more than 113 Chinese illegal immigrants who had been interdicted in the Atlantic Ocean near Bermuda aboard the human smuggling vessel Xing Da.

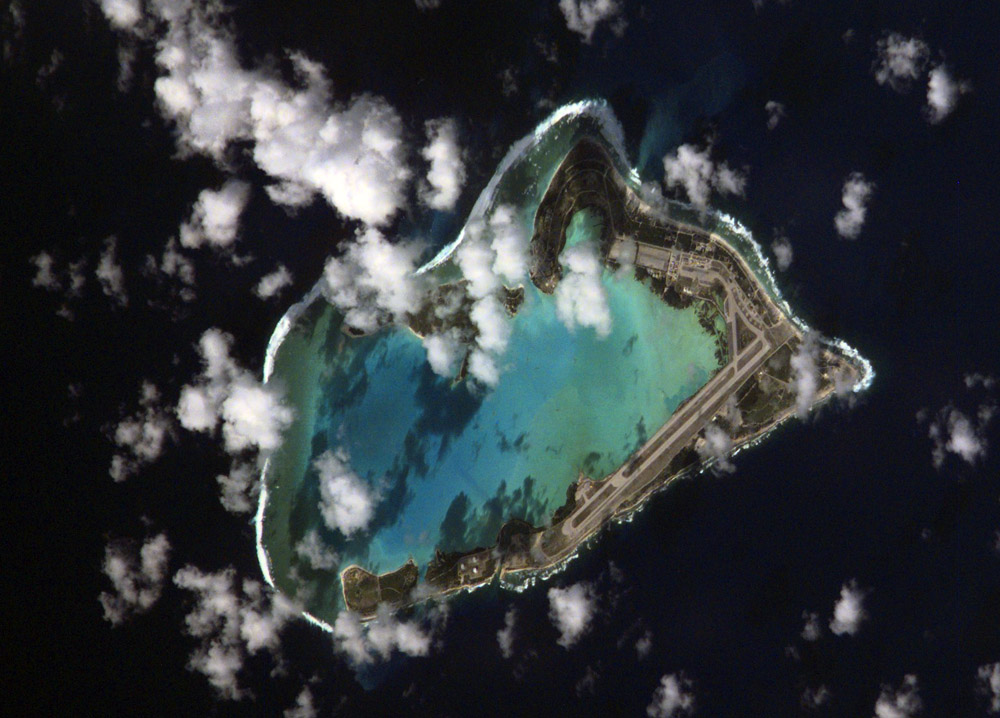
Wake Island as seen in March 2001 from the International Space Station

==== U.S. Air Force regains control ====
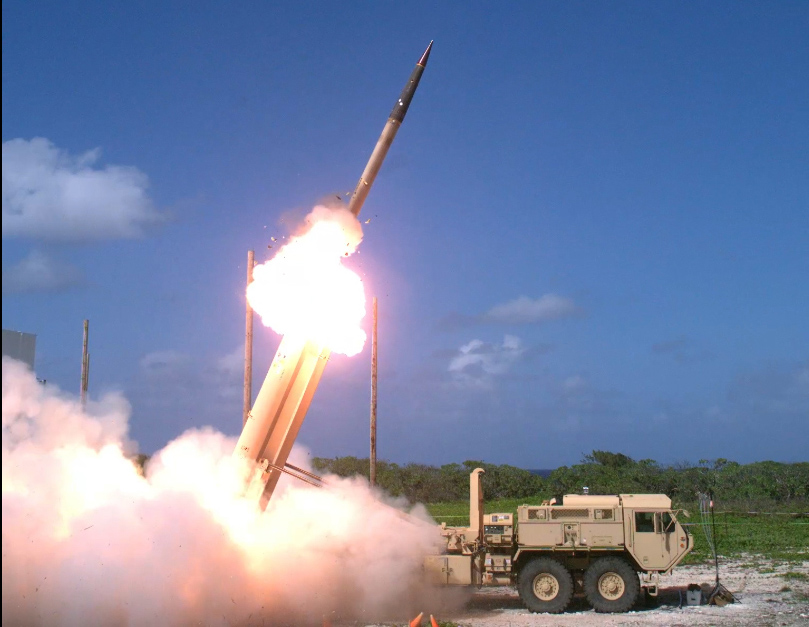
A Terminal High Altitude Area Defense (THAAD) interceptor is launched from a THAAD battery located on Wake Island, during Flight Test Operational (FTO)-02 Event 2a, conducted November 1, 2015.

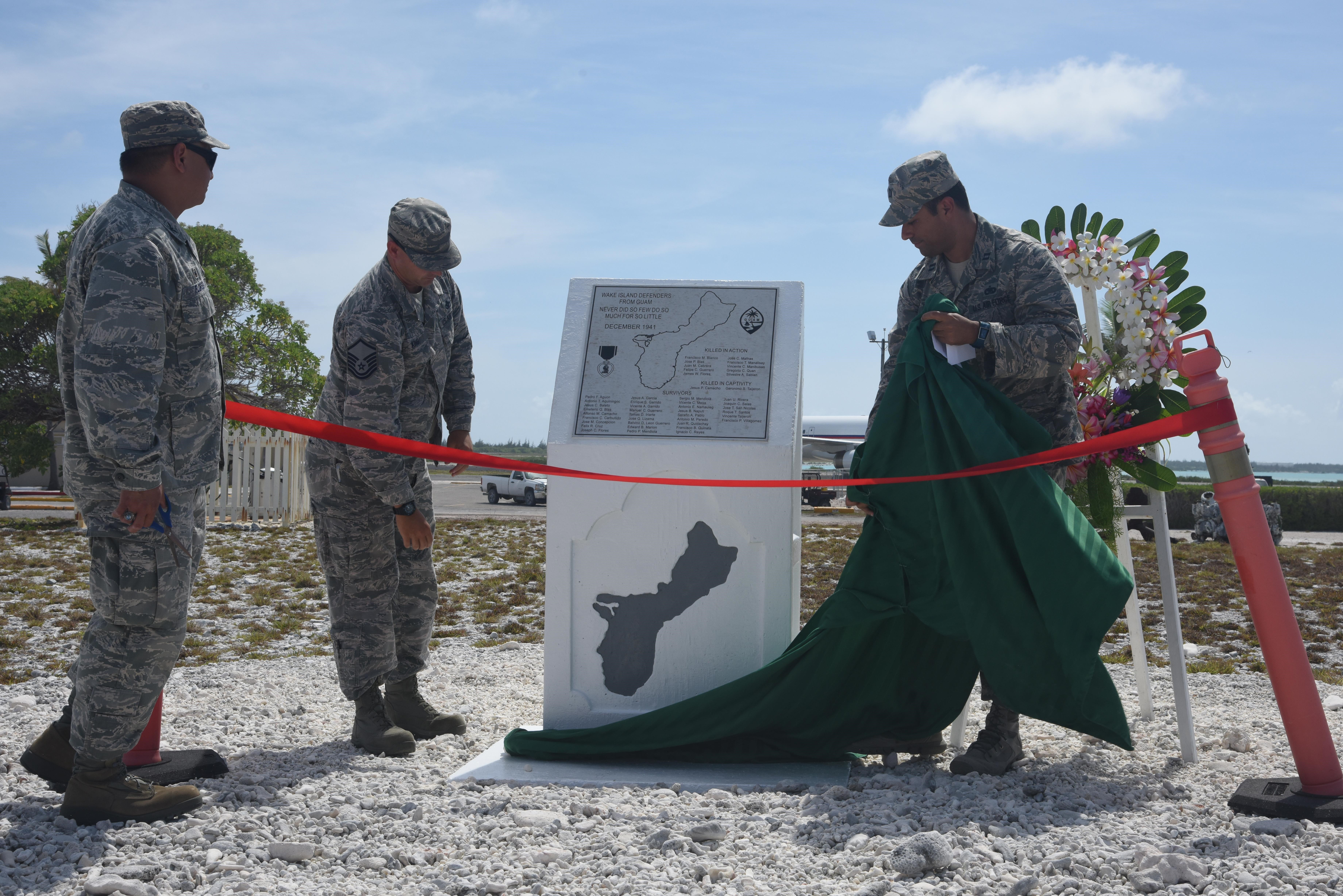
US Air Force Captain Allen Jaime, commander of Wake Island at the time, unveiled the new Guam Memorial on June 8, 2017. The memorial honors the 45 Chamorros from Guam who worked for Pan American Airlines and were on the island when the Japanese attacked on December 8, 1941. 10 of the men were killed during the attack, and the remaining 35 were sent to prison camps in Japan and China.

On October 1, 2002, administrative control and support of Wake Island was transferred from the U.S. Army to the U.S. Air Force's 15th Wing of PACAF based at Hickam Air Force Base in Hawaii. The 15th Wing had previously controlled Wake from July 1, 1973, to September 30, 1994. Although the Air Force was again in control, the Missile Defense Agency would continue operating the Wake Island Launch Center. The U.S. Army's Ronald Reagan Ballistic Missile Defense Test Site would maintain and operate the launch facilities and provide instrumentation, communications, flight and ground safety, security, and other support.

On August 31, 2006, Wake Island was hit by the Typhoon Ioke with sustained winds over 155 mph and gusts of 190; this caused damage to the wildlife and facilities on the atoll. There was considerable damage, but overall, it was less than feared on inspection. The runway was largely intact, but some electrical and waste-water systems had been damaged. The golf course at Heel Point and Golf clubhouse was also damaged by the Ioke Typhoon.

On January 6, 2009, President George W. Bush issued Executive Order 8836, establishing Pacific Remote Islands Marine National Monument to preserve the marine environments around Wake, Baker, Howland, and Jarvis Islands, Johnston Atoll, Kingman Reef and Palmyra Atoll. The proclamation assigned management of the nearby waters and submerged and emergent lands of the islands to the Department of the Interior and management of fishery-related activities in waters beyond 12 nautical miles from the islands' mean low water line to the National Oceanic and Atmospheric Administration (NOAA). On January 16, Secretary of the Interior Dirk Kempthorne issued Order Number 3284 which stated that the area at Wake Island assigned to the Department of Interior by Executive Order 8836 will be managed as a National Wildlife Refuge. Management of the emergent lands at Wake Island by the U.S. Fish and Wildlife Service, however, will not begin until the existing management agreement between the Secretary of the Air Force and the Secretary of the Interior is terminated.

The 611th Air Support Group (ASG), a U.S. Air Force unit based at Joint Base Elmendorf-Richardson in Anchorage, Alaska took over control of Wake Island from the 15th Wing on October 1, 2010. The 611th ASG was already providing support and management to various geographically remote Air Force sites within Alaska, and the addition of Wake Island provided the unit with more opportunities for outdoor projects during the winter months when projects in Alaska are minimal. The 611th ASG, a unit of the 11th Air Force, was renamed the Pacific Air Forces Regional Support Center.

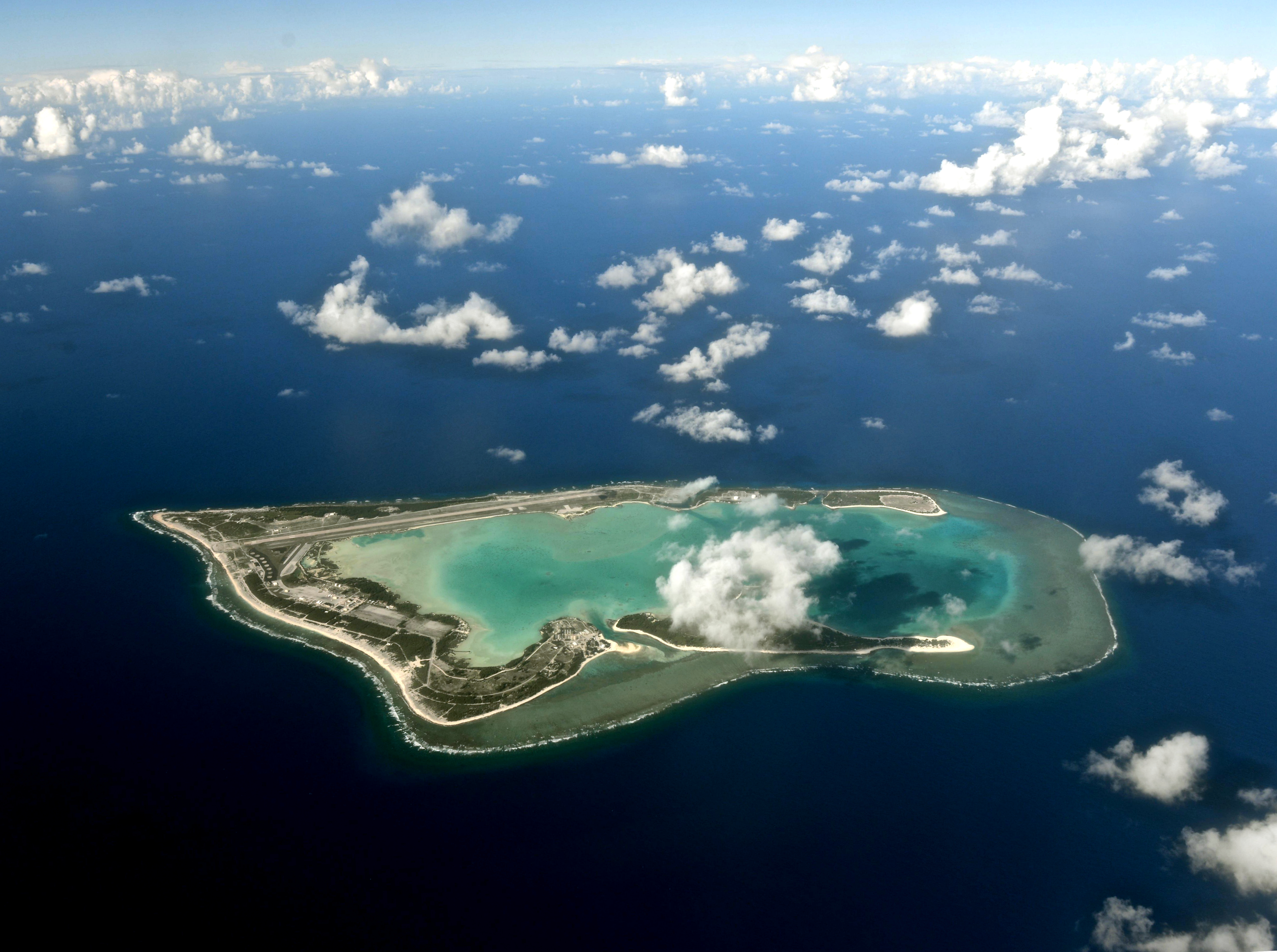
Wake Island in 2014

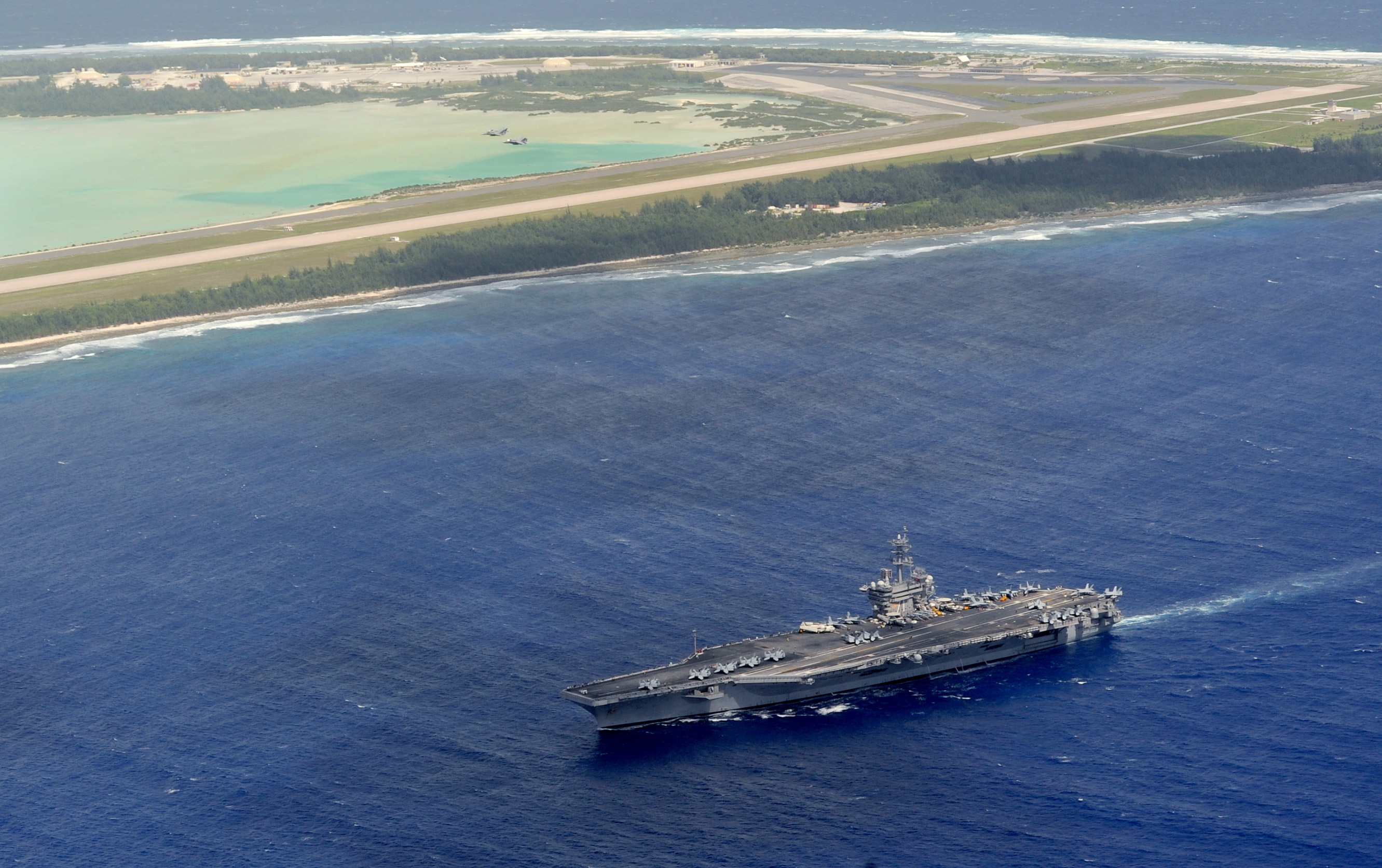
USS Theodore Roosevelt passes by Wake, 2017

On September 27, 2014, President Barack Obama issued Executive Order 9173 to expand the area of the Pacific Remote Islands Marine National Monument out to the full 200 nautical miles U.S. exclusive economic zone (EEZ) boundary for each island. By this proclamation, the area of the monument at Wake Island was increased from 15,085 to 167,336 mi^{2} (39,070 to 433,400 km^{2}). In 2014, 3300 tons of waste dumps was removed from the islands on barges.

On November 1, 2015, a complex $230 million U.S. military missile defense system test event, called Campaign Fierce Sentry Flight Test Operational-02 Event 2 (FTO-02 E2), was conducted at Wake Island and the surrounding ocean areas. The test involved a Terminal High Altitude Area Defense (THAAD) system built by Lockheed Martin, two AN/TPY-2 radar systems built by Raytheon, Lockheed's Command, Control, Battle Management, and Communications system, and USS John Paul Jones guided missile destroyer with its AN/SPY-1 radar. The objective was to test the ability of the Aegis Ballistic Missile Defense and THAAD Weapon Systems to defeat a raid of three near-simultaneous air and missile targets, consisting of one medium-range ballistic missile, one short-range ballistic missile and one cruise missile target. During the test, a THAAD system on Wake Island detected and destroyed a short-range target simulating a short-range ballistic missile launched by a C-17 transport plane. At the same time, the THAAD system and the destroyer launched missiles to intercept a medium-range ballistic missile launched by a second C-17.

In 2017, Thai contractors and armed forces personnel celebrated the Thai New Year or Songkran in April, and Thai King's Day was celebrated in December. Wake at one point had an estimated 2 million rats, and despite eradication efforts hunting rats at night is popular activity of the islanders.

In early 2024, the island experienced multiple high waves that inundated areas, and this damaged dormitories and a dining hall. This was not the only U.S. facility damaged; to the south at Roi-Namur inundation also caused damage.

== Geography ==
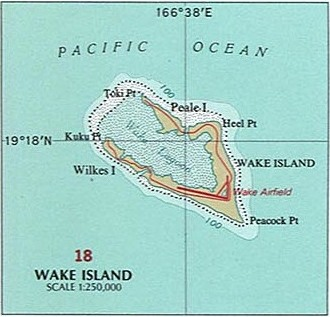
Wake Island map

Name	Acres	Hectares
Wake Islet	1,367.04	553.22
Wilkes Islet	197.44	79.90
Peale Islet	256.83	103.94
Wake Island (total of all three islets)	1,821.31	737.06
Lagoon (water)	1,480.00	600.00
Sand Flat	910.00	370.00

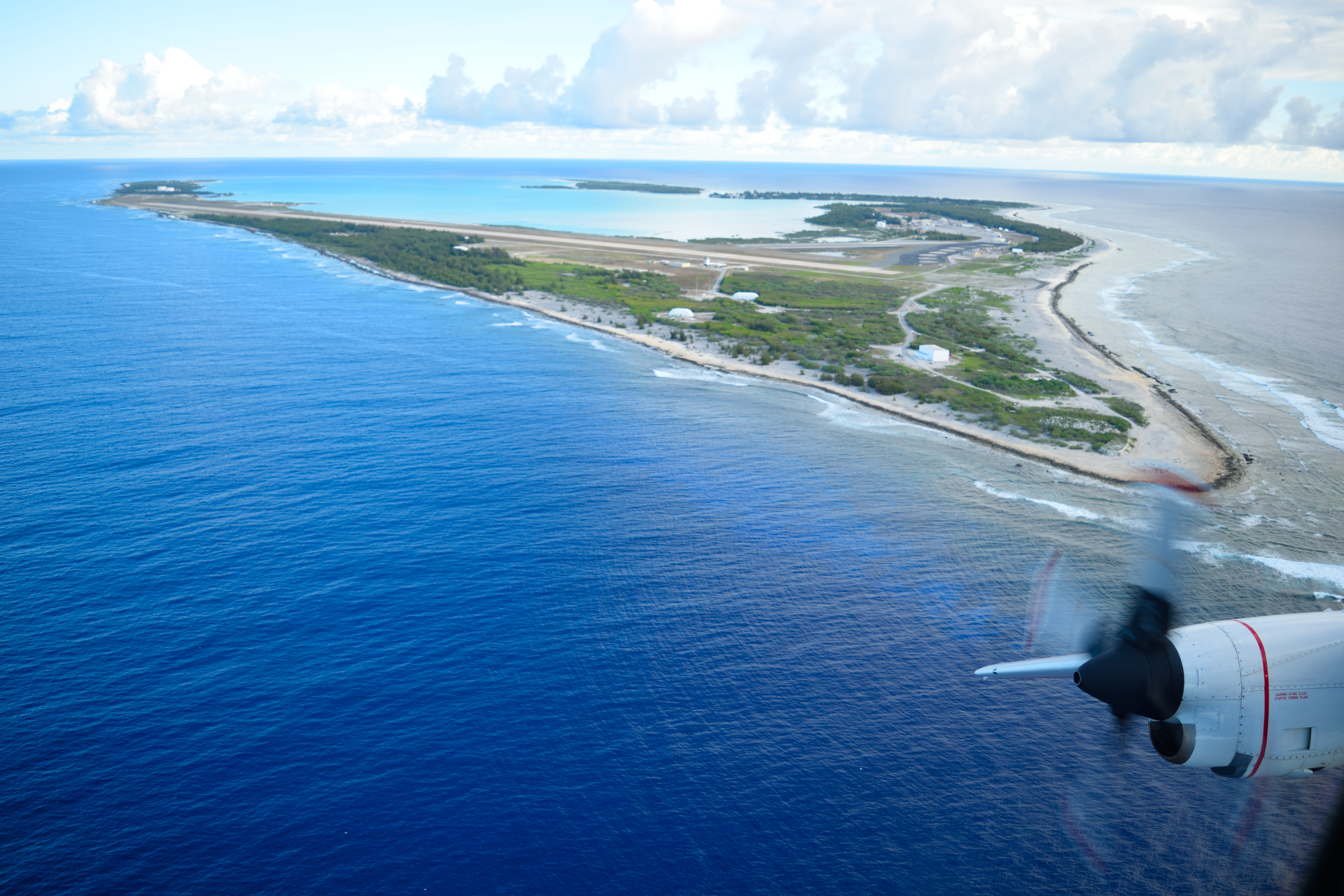
Looking west at Peacock Point, Wake Island in 2015

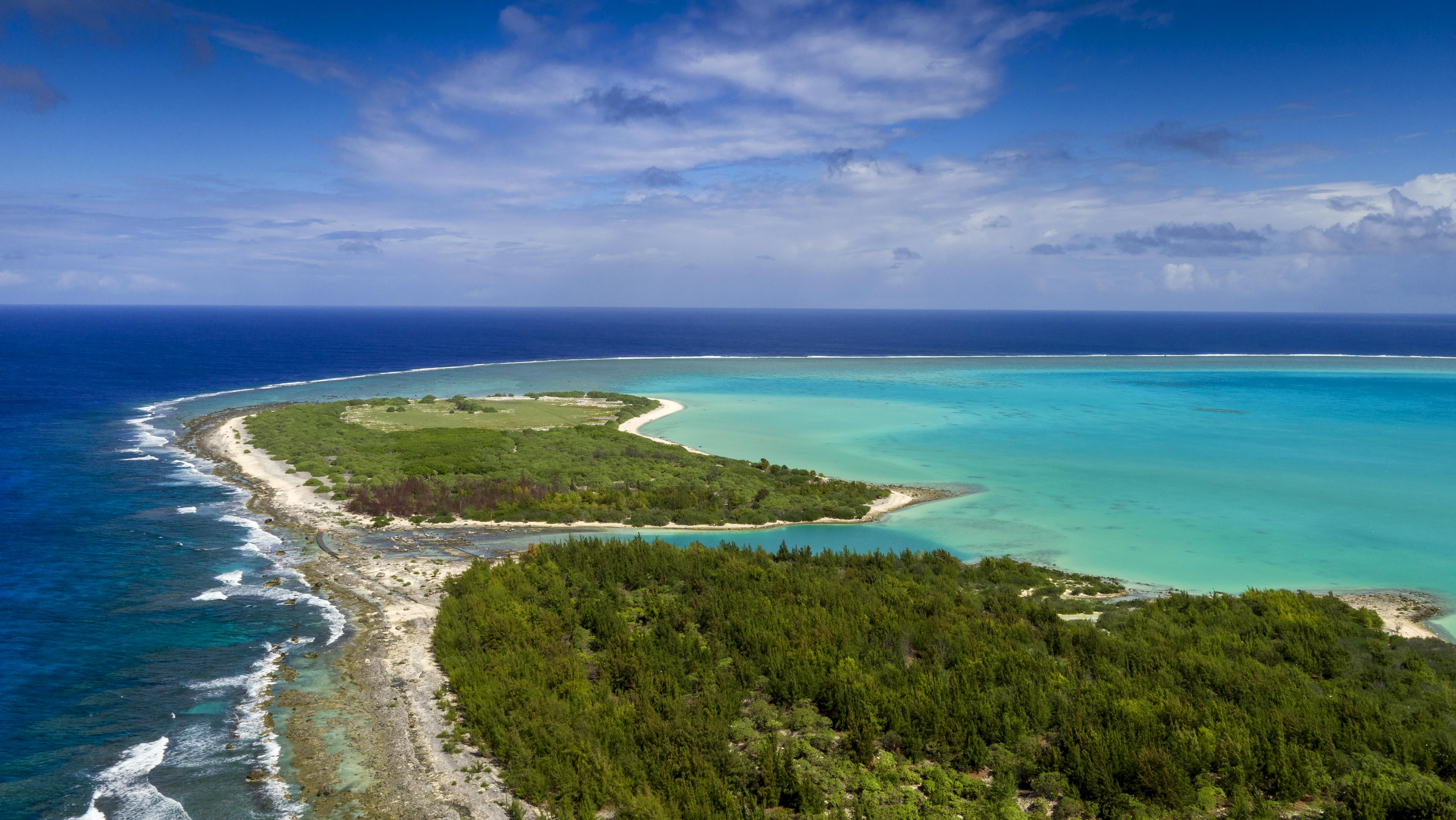
Looking North-west over Wilkes Island, which has almost been split by the old partially completed submarine channel

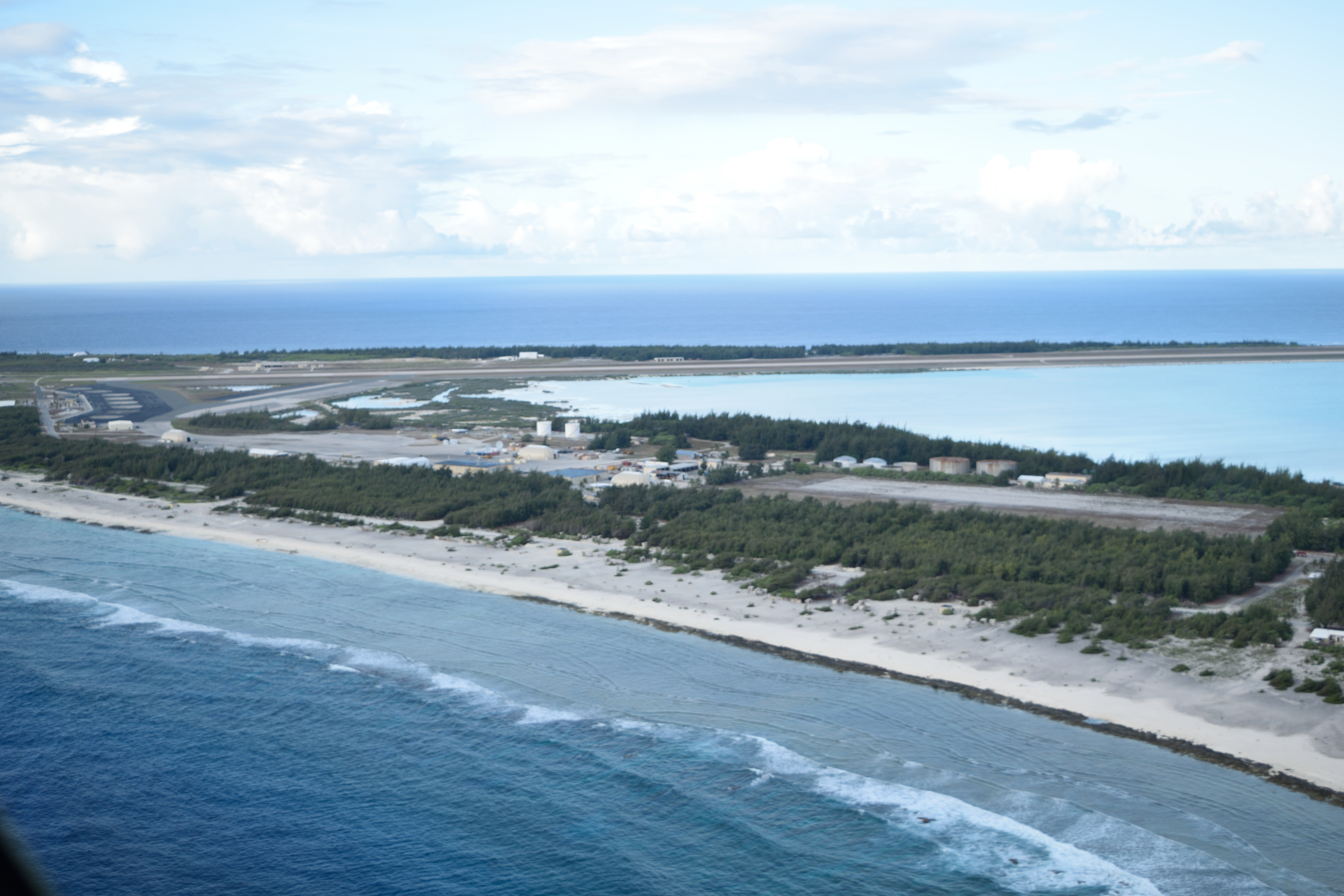
Looking southwest across eastern side of Wake Island

Although Wake Island is officially called an island in its singular form, it is geologically an atoll composed of three islets (Wake, Wilkes, and Peale islets). They enclose a shallow lagoon of 3.3 by 7.7 kilometers (2.1 by 4.8 miles), with average depth of around 1 meter (3.3 feet) and a maximum depth of 4.5 meters (15 feet). It is ringed by a sandy beach of around 80 meters (260 feet) wide with an offshore fringing reef. The atoll has an average elevation of about 3.6 meters (12 feet) and maximum elevation of 6.4 meters (21 feet), with a total land area of about 6.5 square kilometers (2.5 square miles).

The island is made of coral and sand, as it sits on a coral reef that grew on the top of a seamount made of the remnants of an old volcano. This is consistent with many islands in the Pacific, which are formed when waves erode extinct volcanoes until they reach the surface of the ocean and coral grows on it, forming an atoll (see also guyot). The island is covered in boulders that average 5–6 feet in diameter (1–2 meters) especially on the southern side of Wake and Wilkes islands.

Wake is located two-thirds of the way from Honolulu to Guam; Honolulu is 2,300 mi (3,700 km) to the east, and Guam 1,510 mi (2,430 km) to the west. Midway Atoll is 1,170 mi (1,880 km) to the northeast. The closest land is the uninhabited Bokak Atoll, 348 mi (560 km) away in the Marshall Islands to the southeast. The atoll is to the west of the International Date Line and in the Wake Island Time Zone (UTC+12), the easternmost time zone of the United States and almost one day ahead of the 50 states.

A shallow channel separates Wake and Peale, while Wilkes is connected to Wake by a causeway. The partially completed submarine channel, which has washed through Wilkes at times, almost splits the island in half.

The atoll has several named capes and points:

- Wilkes Island (Split islet on the south and west)
  - Kuku Point (Western Cape of Wilkes)
  - Wilkes Channel (a channel to the small port/harbor area on the south side of the island)
  - Submarine channel (an artificial channel for a partially completed World War II submarine harbor also called New Channel)
- Peale Island (on the north and west, separated from Wake by a narrow channel)
  - Toki Point (Western Cape of Peale)
  - Flipper Point (Tip of Peale Island land that extends into the lagoon pointing west)
- Wake Island (excluding the islets)
  - Heel Point (the north cape of Wake islet before it turns towards Peale)
  - Peacock Point (the Southern and eastern point of Wake Island)
  - Causeway crossing Wilkes Channel to Wilkes Island

=== Climate ===
Wake Island lies in the tropical zone but is subject to periodic temperate storms during the winter. Sea surface temperatures are warm all year long, reaching above 80 °F (27 °C) in summer and autumn. Typhoons occasionally pass over the island. Temperatures range between 65 °F (18 °C) and 95 °F (35 °C) and it gets about 40 inches of rain each year, with the rainy season running from July through October. The island lies in the northeast trade winds of the Pacific. The climate of Wake Island is classified as tropical savanna (Köppen Aw/As, Trewartha Asha).

Climate data for Wake Island, US (1991–2020 normals, extremes 1953–2004)
Month	Jan	Feb	Mar	Apr	May	Jun	Jul	Aug	Sep	Oct	Nov	Dec	Year
Record high °F (°C)	89 (32)	93 (34)	92 (33)	94 (34)	93 (34)	94 (34)	94 (34)	97 (36)	96 (36)	92 (33)	90 (32)	91 (33)	97 (36)
Mean daily maximum °F (°C)	83.2 (28.4)	83.3 (28.5)	84.0 (28.9)	85.4 (29.7)	86.8 (30.4)	88.8 (31.6)	89.1 (31.7)	89.4 (31.9)	89.1 (31.7)	88.1 (31.2)	86.0 (30.0)	84.4 (29.1)	86.5 (30.3)
Daily mean °F (°C)	78.7 (25.9)	78.3 (25.7)	78.7 (25.9)	80.0 (26.7)	81.4 (27.4)	83.3 (28.5)	83.4 (28.6)	83.7 (28.7)	83.4 (28.6)	82.8 (28.2)	81.3 (27.4)	79.9 (26.6)	81.2 (27.3)
Mean daily minimum °F (°C)	74.2 (23.4)	73.3 (22.9)	73.4 (23.0)	74.5 (23.6)	76.0 (24.4)	77.9 (25.5)	77.7 (25.4)	78.0 (25.6)	77.7 (25.4)	77.4 (25.2)	76.5 (24.7)	75.3 (24.1)	76.0 (24.4)
Record low °F (°C)	63 (17)	63 (17)	60 (16)	62 (17)	64 (18)	70 (21)	65 (18)	65 (18)	64 (18)	63 (17)	61 (16)	64 (18)	60 (16)
Average precipitation inches (mm)	1.64 (42)	1.48 (38)	2.07 (53)	1.50 (38)	2.03 (52)	1.78 (45)	4.10 (104)	4.38 (111)	5.91 (150)	5.18 (132)	2.39 (61)	2.14 (54)	34.60 (879)
Average precipitation days (≥ 0.01 mm)	9.6	8.6	11.9	13.2	13.2	13.5	18.0	18.4	19.6	18.4	14.4	13.4	172.2
Source 1: NOAA
Source 2: XMACIS2

==== Typhoons ====
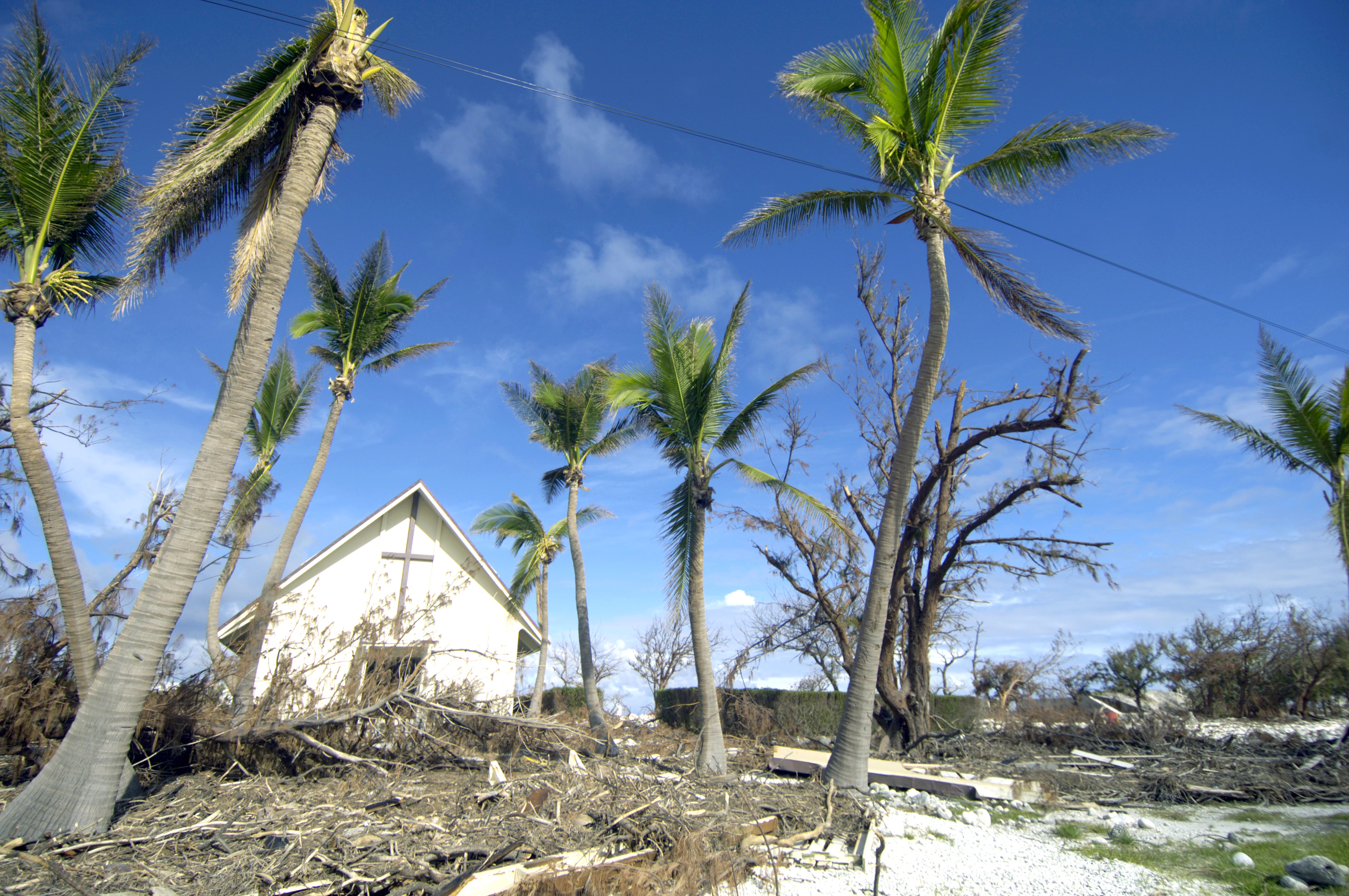
Damaged trees and debris left by Super Typhoon Ioke in 2006 at the Memorial Chapel on Wake Island

On October 19, 1940, an unnamed typhoon hit Wake Island with 120 knots (220 km/h) winds. This was the first recorded typhoon to hit the island since observations began in 1935.

Super Typhoon Olive impacted Wake on September 16, 1952, with wind speeds reaching 150 knots (280 km/h). Olive caused major flooding, destroyed approximately 85% of its structures, and caused US$1.6 million in damage.

On September 16, 1967, at 10:40 pm local time, the eye of Super Typhoon Sarah passed over the island. Sustained winds in the eyewall were 130 knots (240 km/h), from the north before the eye and the south afterward. All non-reinforced structures were demolished. There were no serious injuries, and most of the civilian population was evacuated after the storm.

On August 28, 2006, the United States Air Force evacuated all 188 residents and suspended all operations as Category 5 Super Typhoon Ioke headed toward Wake. By August 31 the southwestern eyewall of the storm passed over the island, with winds well over 185 miles per hour (298 km/h), driving a 20 ft (6 m) storm surge and waves directly into the lagoon inflicting major damage. A U.S. Air Force assessment and repair team returned to the island in September 2006 and restored limited function to the airfield and facilities leading ultimately to a full return to normal operations.

=== Ecology ===
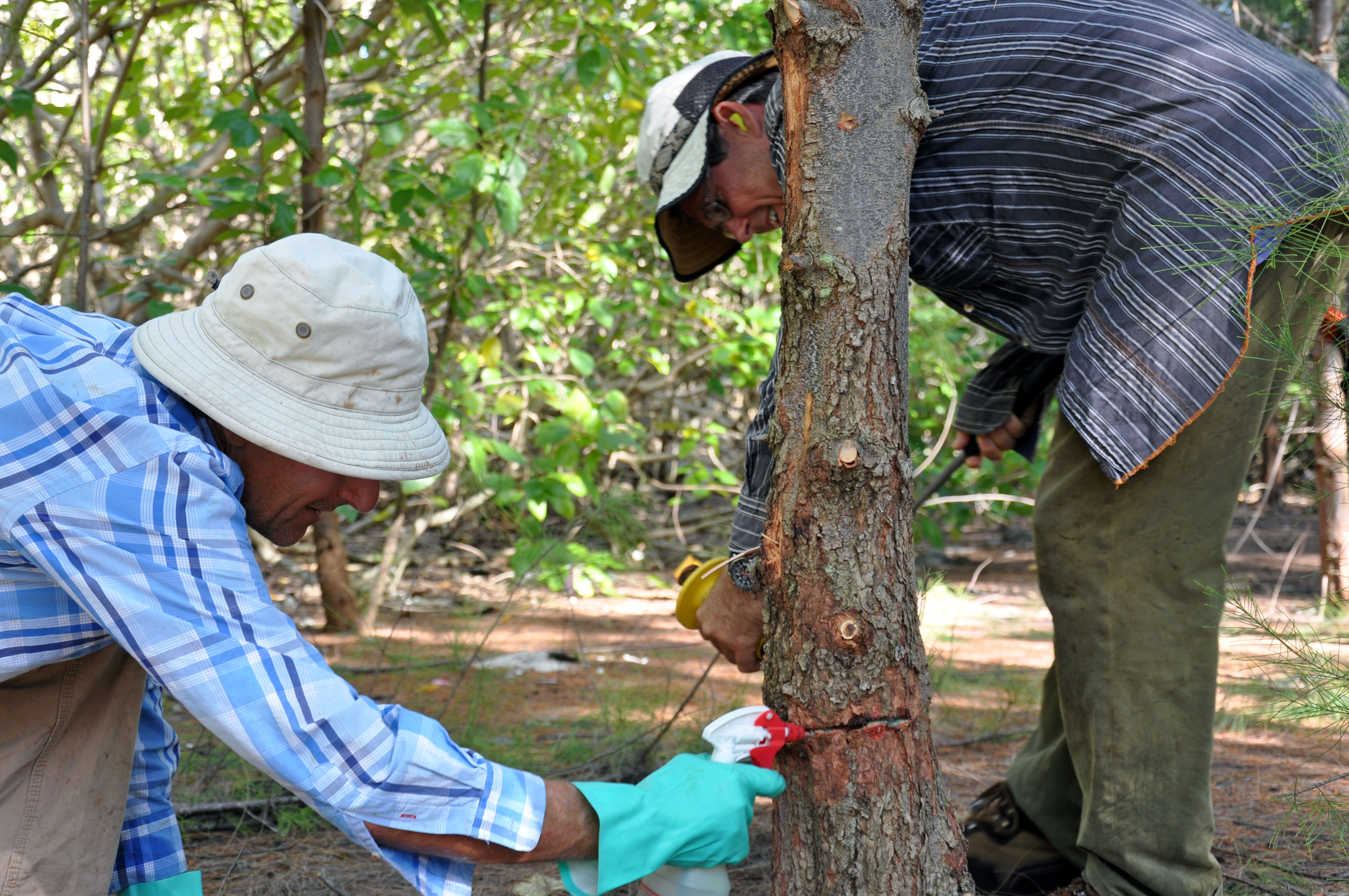
Ecologists on Wake Atoll spraying herbicide into the bark of an invasive ironwood tree, 2017

Wake Island is home to the Wake Atoll National Wildlife Refuge and is a unit of the Pacific Islands Heritage Marine National Monument.

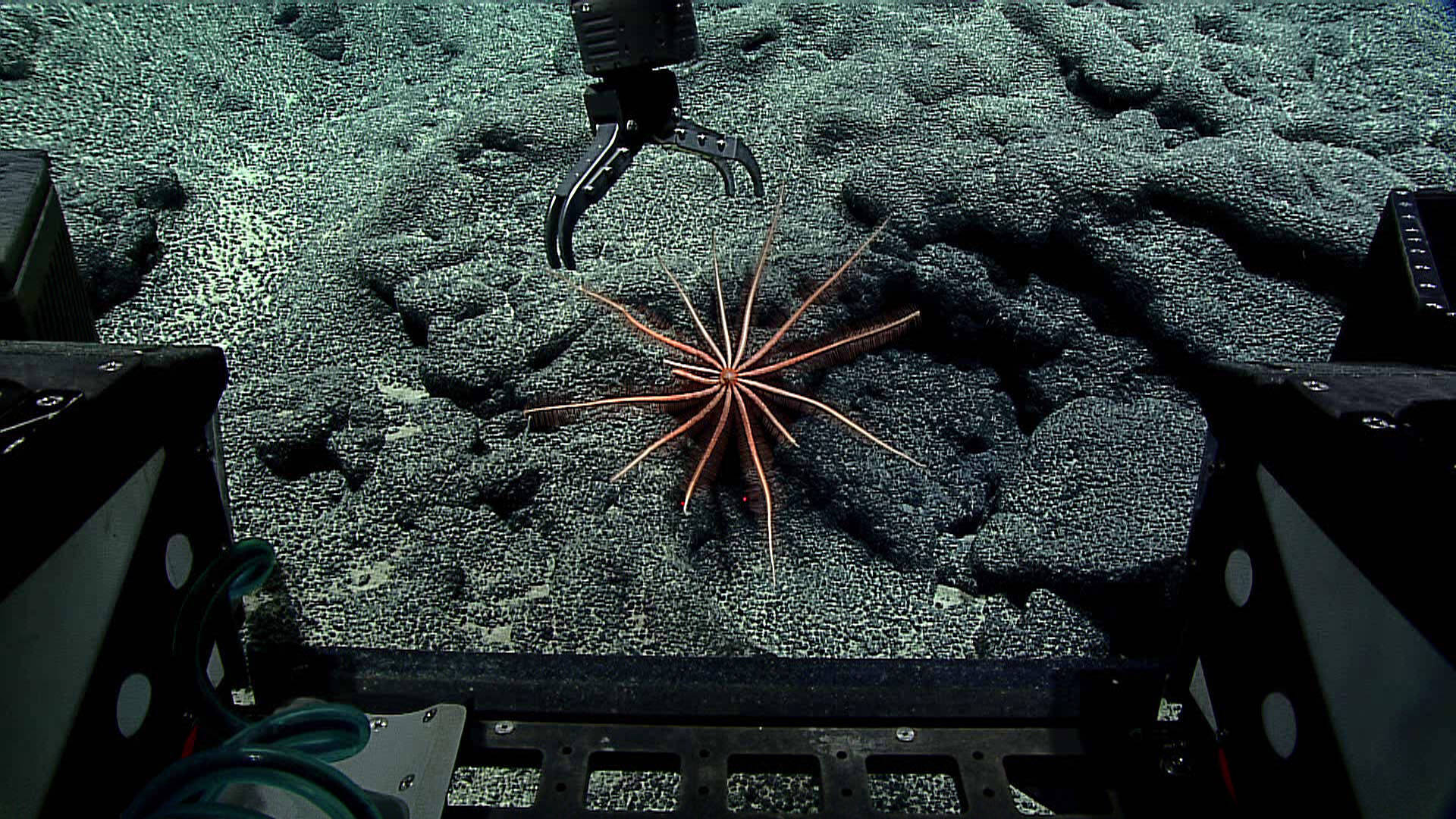
Brisinga panopla in the waters near Wake Island

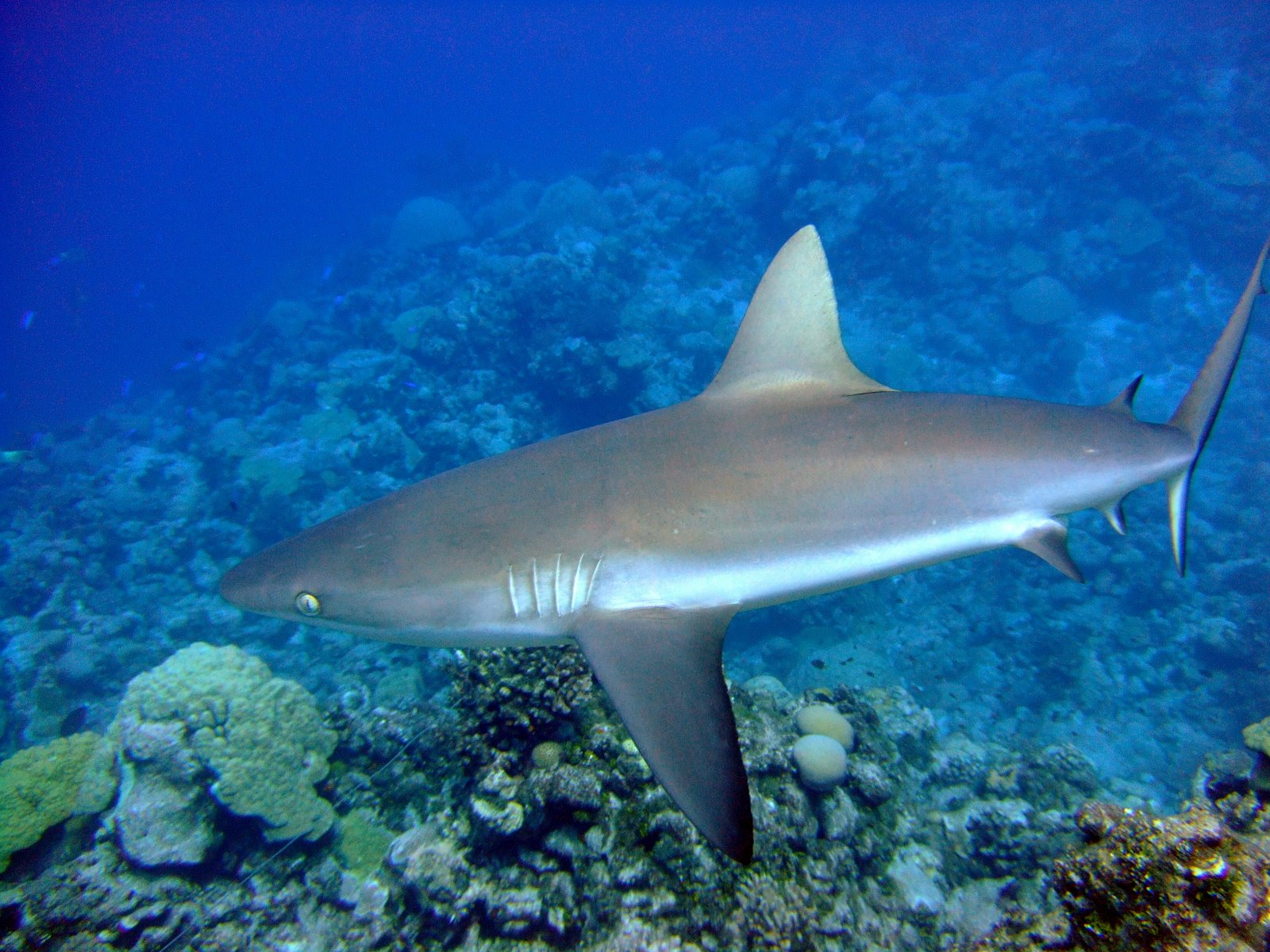
A Grey Reef shark in the waters near Wake

Native vegetation communities of Wake Island include scrub, grass, and wetlands. Tournefortia argentia (heliotrope tree) dominated scrublands exist in association with Scaevola taccada (beach cabbage), Cordia subcordata (sea trumpet), and Pisonia grandis. Grassland species include Dactyloctenium aegyptium and Tribulus cistoides. Wetlands are dominated by Sesuvium portulacastrum, and Pemphis acidula is found near intertidal lagoons.

The atoll, with its surrounding marine waters, has been recognized as an Important Bird Area (IBA) by BirdLife International for its sooty tern colony, with some 200,000 individual birds estimated in 1999. 56 bird species have been sighted on the atoll. Wilkes Island is largely designated as a bird refuge and includes a field mowed annually to attract sooty terns and other birds that might otherwise seek to nest on the mowed apron of the airfield runway.

Due to human use, several invasive species have become established on the atoll. Feral cats were introduced in the 1960s as pets and for pest control. Eradication efforts began in earnest in 1996 and were deemed successful in 2008. Two species of rat, Rattus exulans (Polynesian rat) and Rattus tanezumi (Asian house rat), have colonized the island. R. tanezumi populations were successfully eradicated by 2014, however, R. exulans persists. Casuarina equisetifolia (ironwood or coastal she-oak) was allegedly planted on Wake Island by Boy Scouts in the 1960s for use as a windbreak. It formed large mono-cultural forests that choked out native vegetation. Concerted efforts to kill the population began in 2017. Other introduced plant species include Cynodon dactylon (Bermuda grass) and Leucaena leucocephala (miracle tree). Non-native species of ants are also found on the atoll. Overall, the island is a mixture of tropical scrub brush and grass with trees; some of the trees are over 25 feet tall (over 7 meters).

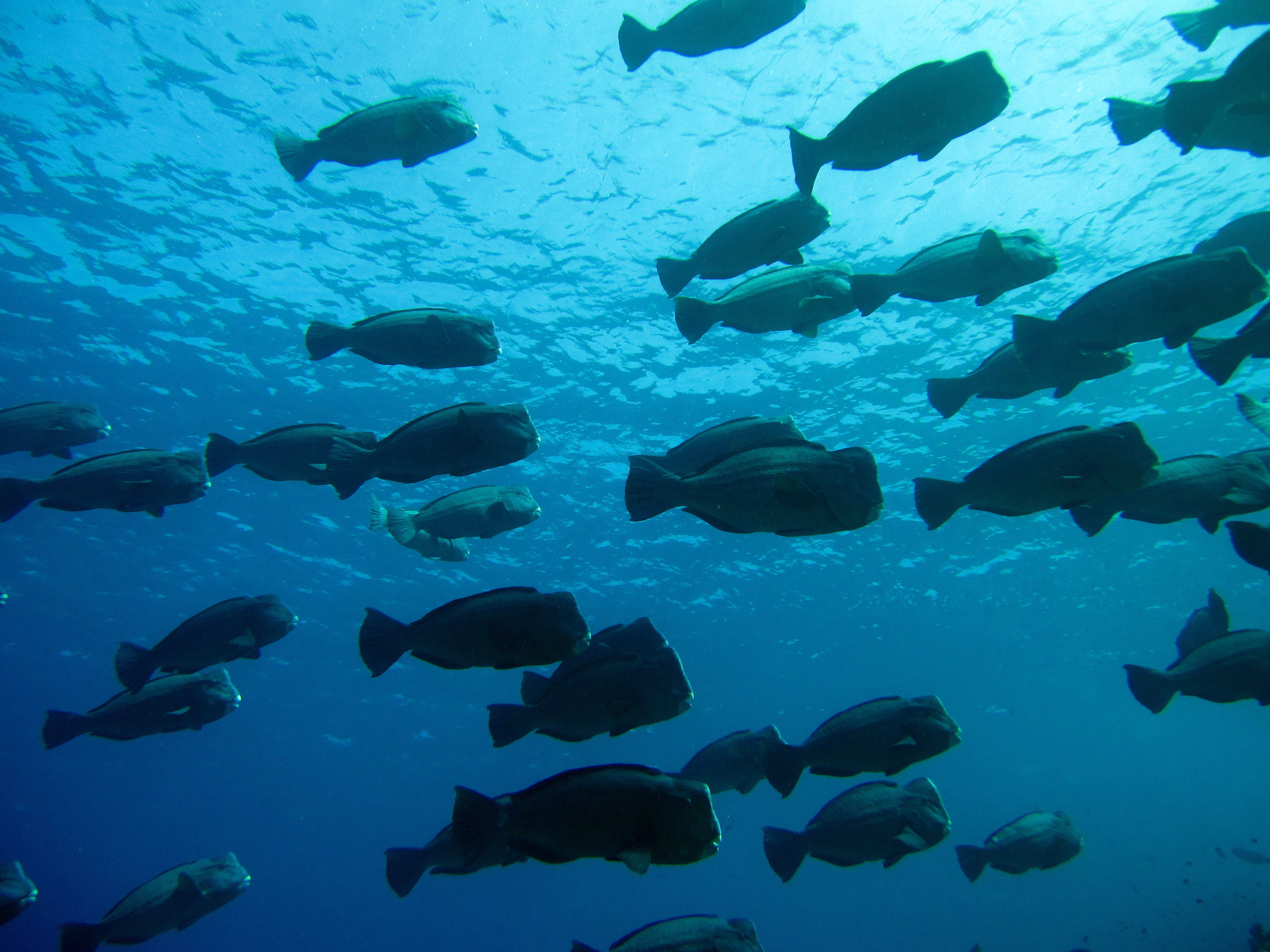
Wake's waters are home to one of the largest known populations of Bumphead Parrotfish.

The lagoon, surrounding reef, and the ocean are noted for their diverse collection of marine life. Wake waters have the largest known population of bumphead parrotfish (Bolbometopon muricatum). The coral reef that surrounds the island is home to at least 100 species of coral and over 320 species of fish. In the coral reef, there is a diverse collection of shark species, including grey reef, blacktip, and dusky sharks. The atoll is home to multiple species of land crabs, with Coenobita perlatus being especially abundant.

== Demographics ==
Historical population
Year	Pop.	±%
1936	~50	—
1941	1,738	—
1942	5,738	+230.1%
1943	4098?	—
1944	?	—
1945	400	—
1960	1,097	+174.3%
1970	1,647	+50.1%
1975	8700+	—
1980	302	—
1990	7	−97.7%
2000	3	−57.1%
2009	150	+4900.0%
2010	188	+25.3%
2015	94	−50.0%
2017	100	+6.4%

Wake Island has no permanent inhabitants, and access is restricted. However, as of 2017, there are approximately 100 Air Force personnel and American and Thai contractor residents at any given time. As of 2011, the billeting at the airfield supports 198 beds.

The start of habitation was in 1935, the staff of the Pan Am waypoint and hotel on Peale Island.

In 1941, over 500 troops and over 1200 contractors were on the island. At the surrender on December 24, 1,603 (not counting those that had died in the battle) were surrendered to the Japanese. There was also 45 people from Guam that had been employed at the Pan Am airport and hotel that were left there also, of those 10 died on Wake and 35 were sent to POW camps in Asia. During the war all but 98 civilians were taken off the island or died, so the main occupants became the Japanese garrison there. The Japanese garrison during the war was nearly 4000, as described earlier in this article. About 1000 of these were confirmed to have been taken away by hospital ship in June 1945.

There were 45 workers from Guam working to support the Pan Am airbase. During the battle for Wake Island, five were killed, and five more were wounded in the attacks on December 8, 1941. Afterward, the Wake Island commander asked if the workers would help defend the island, and they agreed. During the defense of the island, the five wounded workers were killed when the hospital was bombed. When the island fell to the Japanese forces, the 35 remaining were taken prisoner and sent to a Japanese POW camp in China, where two died and others were tortured. The 33 survivors were sent to Osaka, Japan, where they stayed until the end of the war. In 1988, the Guam workers were given veteran status and POW medals for their participation in the Battle of Wake Island.

In 1975, there were at one point 8,700 Vietnamese refugees on the atoll when it was used as a waypoint in Operation New Life.

In the early 21st century, many of the civilian contractors come from Thailand.

== Government ==
Map showing the Wake exclusive economic zone (left) in the United States. To the west is the CNMI and Guam, and to the right is Midway, the Hawaiian Islands, American Samoa, and some other islands/atolls of the US.

According to an agreement between the Department of the Interior and the Department of the Air Force, on June 24, 1972, the United States Air Force assumed responsibility for the civil administration of Wake Island.

The Secretary of the Air Force has delegated the civil administration authority at Wake Island to the General Counsel of the Air Force under U.S. federal law known as the Wake Island Code. The general counsel provides civil, legal, and judicial authority and can appoint one or more judges to serve on the Wake Island Court and the Wake Island Court of Appeals.

Certain authorities have been re-delegated by the general counsel to the Commander, Wake Island, a position currently held by Commander, Detachment 1, Pacific Air Forces Regional Support Center. The commander may issue permits or registrations, appoint peace officers, impose quarantines, issue traffic regulations, commission notaries public, direct evacuations and inspections and carry out other duties, powers, and functions as the agent of the general counsel on Wake.

Since Wake Island is an active Air Force airfield, the commander is also the senior officer in charge of all activities on the island.

The Empire of Japan administered the atoll from December 23, 1941, to September 4, 1945.

The U.S. administered the island from January 17, 1899, when it was both unclaimed and uninhabited.

== Transportation ==
=== Aviation ===
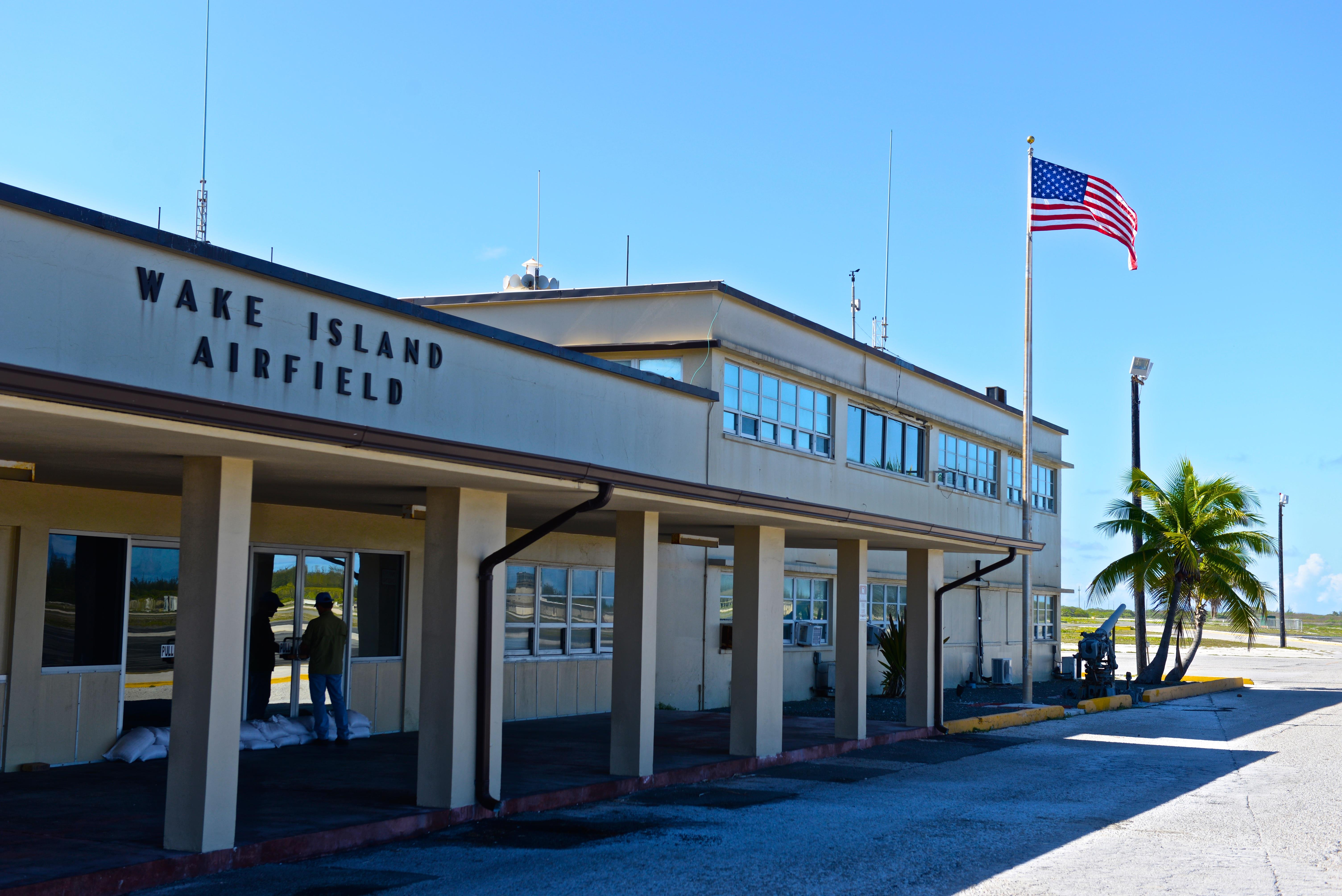
Wake Island Airport Terminal is listed as a national historic landmark of the US.

Air transportation facilities at Wake are operated by the United States Air Force at Wake Island Airfield in support of trans-Pacific military operations, western Pacific military contingency operations, and missile launch activities. The 9,850-foot-long (3,000-meter) runway on Wake is also available to provide military and commercial in-flight emergency services. Although there is only one flight scheduled every other week to transport passengers and cargo to Wake, approximately 600 aircraft per year use Wake Island Airfield.

In 2020, the runway and support facilities were modernized.

=== Ports ===
Although Wake Island is supplied by seagoing barges and ships, the island's only harbor between Wilkes and Wake is too narrow and shallow for seagoing vessels to enter. The Base Operations Support (BOS) contractor maintains three small landing barges for transferring material from ships moored offshore to the dockyard in the harbor. Hydrants also pump gasoline and JP-5 fuels to the storage tanks on Wilkes. The landing barges and recreational offshore sportfishing boats are docked in the marina. A submarine channel was planned for Wilkes Island but was just partially complete at the start of hostilities in World War II.

=== Roads ===
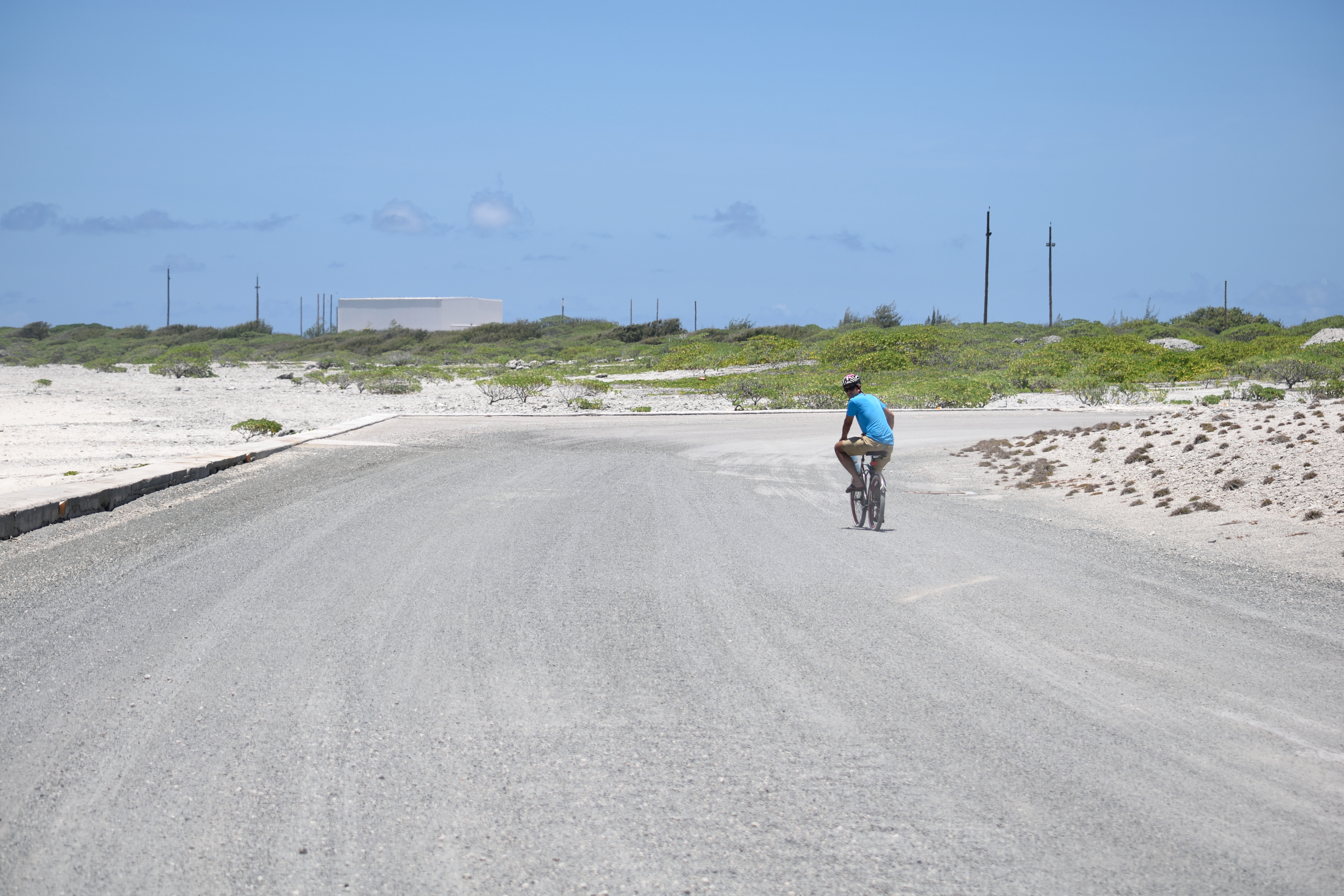
Road on Wake Island

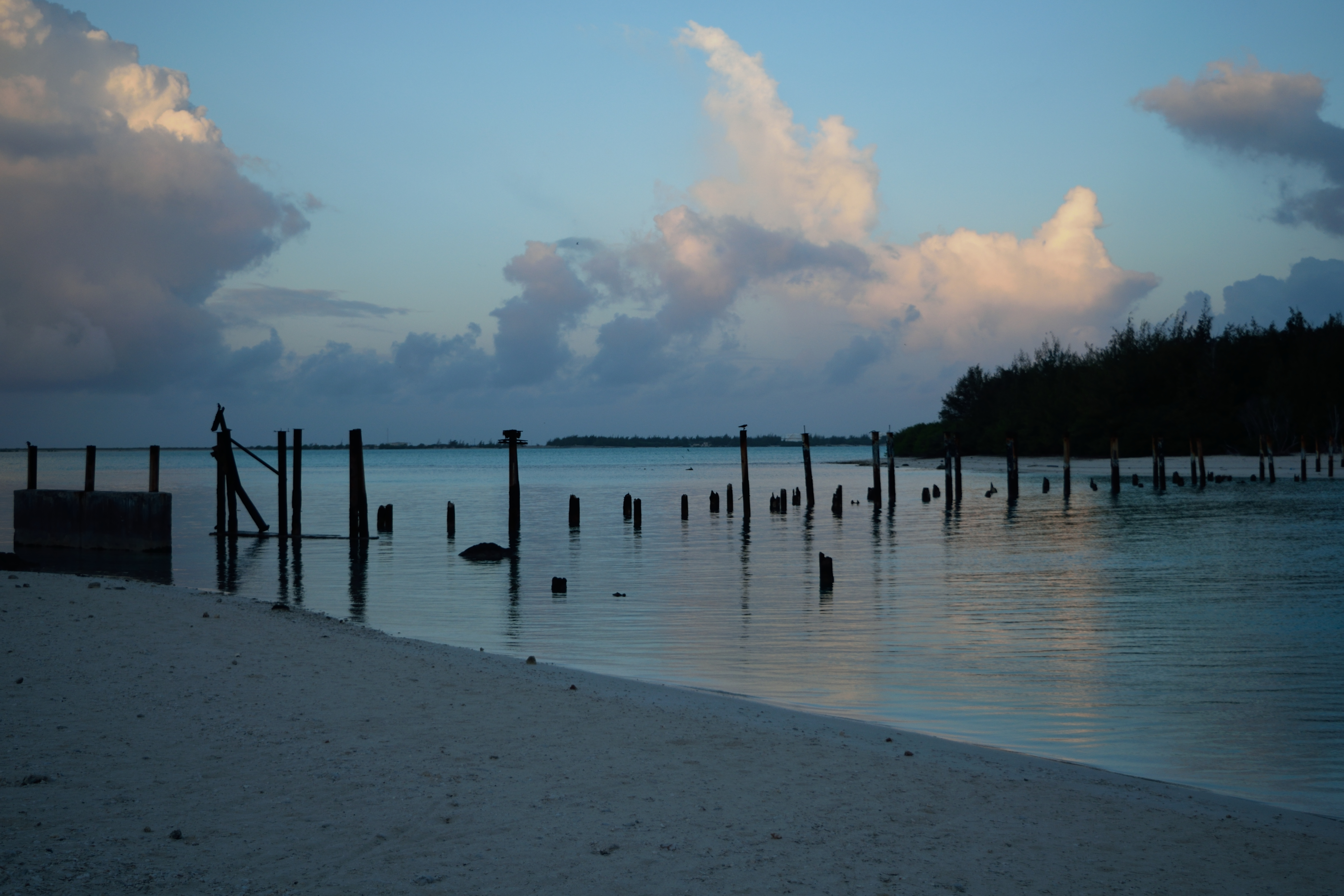
Remnants of the old bridge to Peale Island

Transportation on Wake Island is provided by contractors or government-owned vehicles. The primary road is a two-lane paved road extending the length of Wake Island to the causeway between Wake Island and Wilkes Island. A bridge connecting Wake and Peale Islands burned down in December 2002. The causeway was rehabilitated in 2003 and is capable of supporting heavy equipment. A combination of paved and coral gravel roads serves the marina area. Paved access to Wilkes Island ends at the petroleum tank farm, where a road constructed of crushed coral provides access to the western point of Wilkes Island. Near the unfinished WWII submarine channel, a portion of the road is flooded nearly every year by high seas. The launch sites are accessed from the main paved road on Wake Island by paved and coral roads. Generally, the road network is suitable for low-speed, light-duty use only. Wake Island's paved roadway network has been adequately maintained to move materials, services, and personnel from the airfield on the southern end to the personnel support area on the northern end. Modes of transportation include walking, bicycles, light utility carts, automobiles, vans, and larger trucks and equipment.

The main road that connects Wilkes and most of Wake Island is a crushed coral road about 30 feet (9.1 meters) wide that runs the perimeter. There used to be since World War II a 450-foot-long timber bridge between Wake and Peale. With the bridge gone, traversing between Wake and Peale is usually done by a kayak trip.

== Territorial claims ==
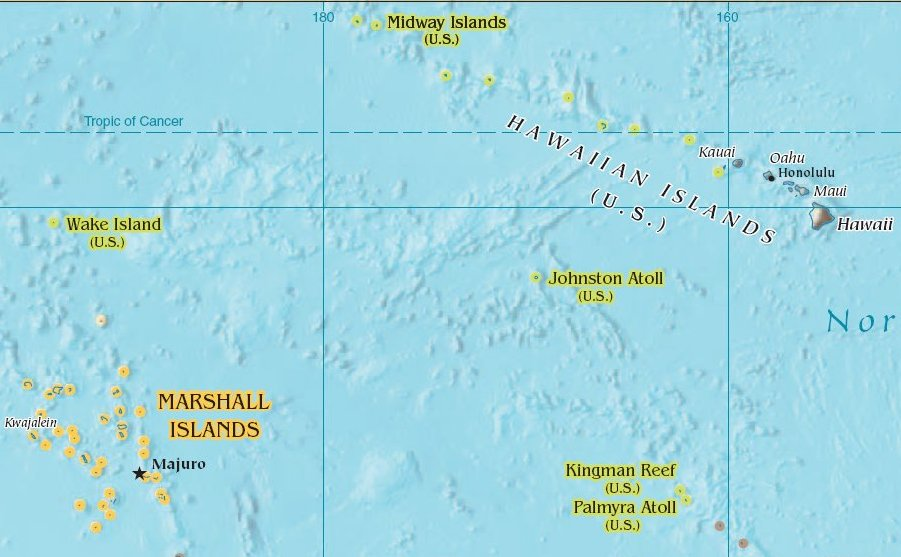
Map showing Pacific locations Midway, Wake, Marshall, and Hawaiian Islands

No one has lodged any complaints or counterclaims after 1899, although the US occasionally found Japanese bird hunters on the island and so formally asked the Japanese about this, but they reaffirmed that they were not claiming Wake with a diplomatic note. Japanese Minister Takahira Kogorō said in 1902 that the Japanese Government had "no claim whatever to make on the sovereignty of the island, but that if any subjects are found on the island the Imperial Government expects that they should be properly protected as long as they are engaged in peaceful occupations." (see also Root–Takahira Agreement) The island did not become an issue until World War II, the Japanese occupied the island from December 23, 1941, to September 4, 1945.

For 75 years, there were no claims on Wake until 1973, when a claim was made from the Congress of the Trust Territory of the Pacific. The Marshallese were people living on islands that Germany annexed in the late 19th century, taken in World War I, and under Japanese control until 1944, when the U.S. captured the islands. The U.S. was to administer the islands after World War II but the Congress of the Trust Territory of the Pacific Islands, which was established in 1964, attempted to make a change. In 1973, Marshallese in the Trust Territory of the Pacific claimed Wake Island, which they call Ānen Kio (new orthography) or Enen-kio (old orthography). In 1973, Marshallese lawmakers meeting in Saipan at the Congress of Micronesia, the legislative body for the Trust Territory of the Pacific Islands, asserted that "Enen-kio is and always has been the property of the people of the Marshall Islands". Their claim was based on oral legends and songs, passed down through generations, describing ancient Marshallese voyages to Wake to gather food and a sacred bird's wing bone used in traditional tattooing ceremonies. In 1990, legislation in the U.S. Congress proposed including Wake Island within the boundaries of the U.S. territory of Guam. In response, Marshallese President Amata Kabua reasserted his nation's claim to Wake, declaring that Enen-kio was a site of great importance to the traditional rituals of the Marshall Islands.

The self-declared Kingdom of EnenKio has also claimed Wake Island as a separate sovereign nation and has issued passports. The Kingdom of EnenKio is not recognized in any international forum as a sovereign state, nor does any internationally recognized state recognize it. The Kingdom of EnenKio is characterized as a scam by anti-fraud website Quatloos!. In 2000, Robert Moore, who claimed to be the head of state, was prevented by the U.S. Securities and Exchange Commission from fraudulently issuing bonds for the non-existent nation. On April 23, 1998, the Marshall Islands government notified all countries with which it has diplomatic ties that the claims of the Kingdom of EnenKio are fraudulent.

== U.S. National Historic Landmark and NRHP ==
- Wake Island
- U.S. National Register of Historic Places
- U.S. National Historic Landmark
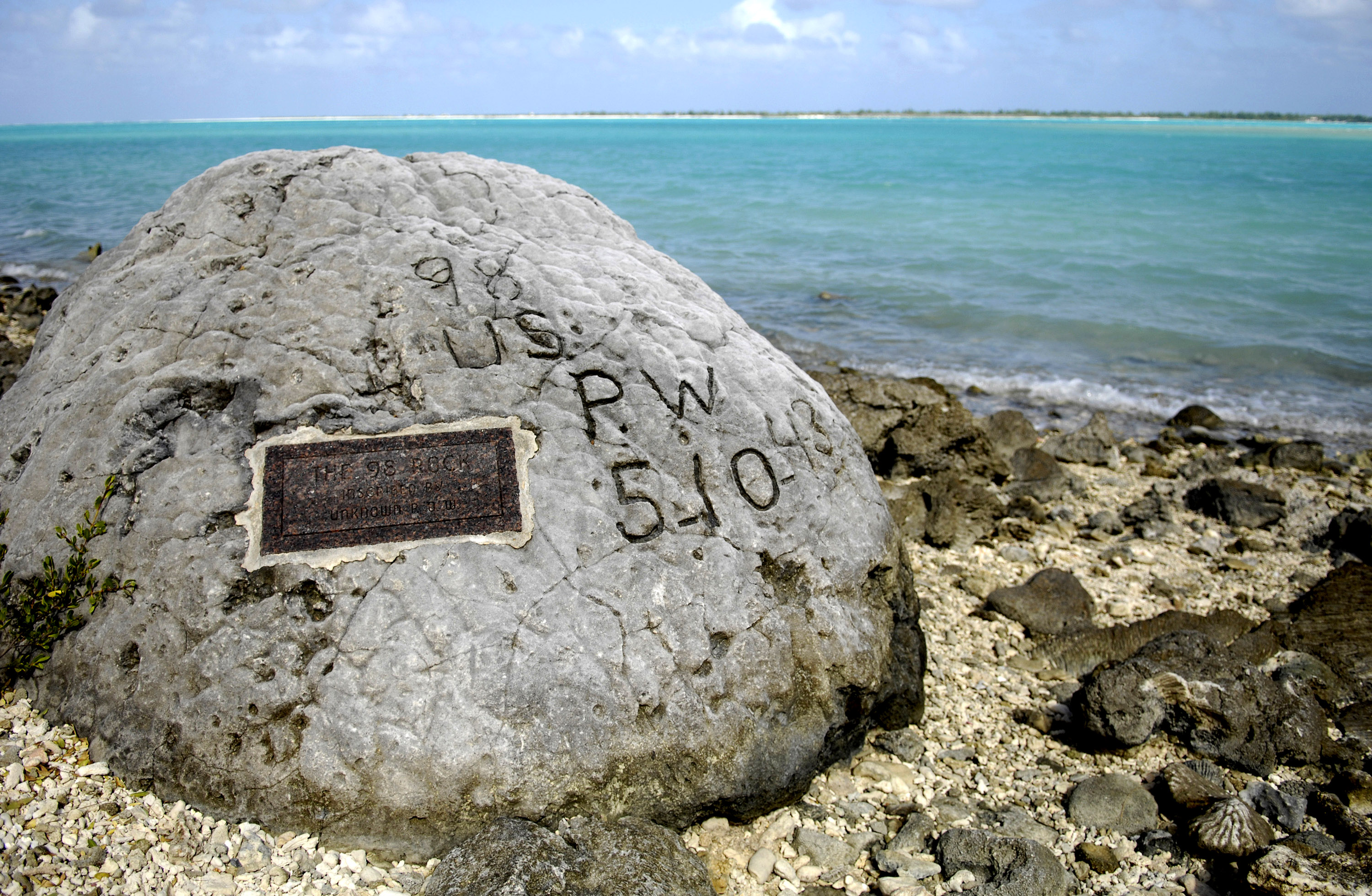
- The "98 Rock" on Wilkes Island was carved by a World War II American civilian POW before his execution by Japanese Admiral Shigematsu Sakaibara.
- Location: Pacific Ocean
- NRHP reference No.: 85002726

Significant dates
- Added to NRHP: September 16, 1985
- Designated NHL: September 16, 1985

In the early 1980s, the National Park Service evaluated Wake Island to determine if the World War II (WWII) cultural resources remaining on Wake, Wilkes, and Peale were of national historical significance. As a result of this survey, Wake Island was designated as a National Historic Landmark on September 16, 1985, helping preserve sites and artifacts on the atoll associated with World War II in the Pacific and the transpacific aviation era before the war. As a National Historic Landmark, Wake Island was also included in the National Register of Historic Places.

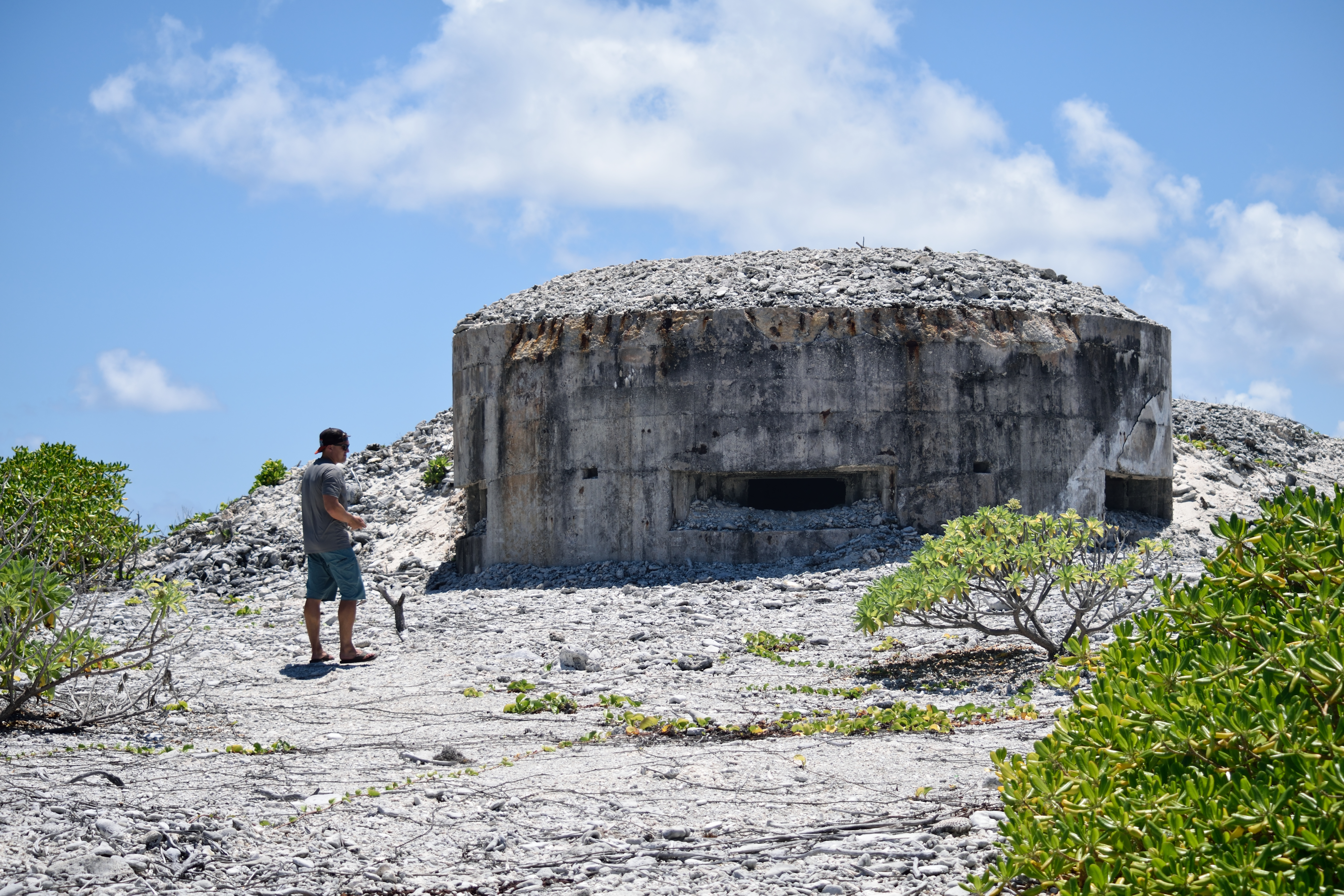
Pillbox bunker on the atoll

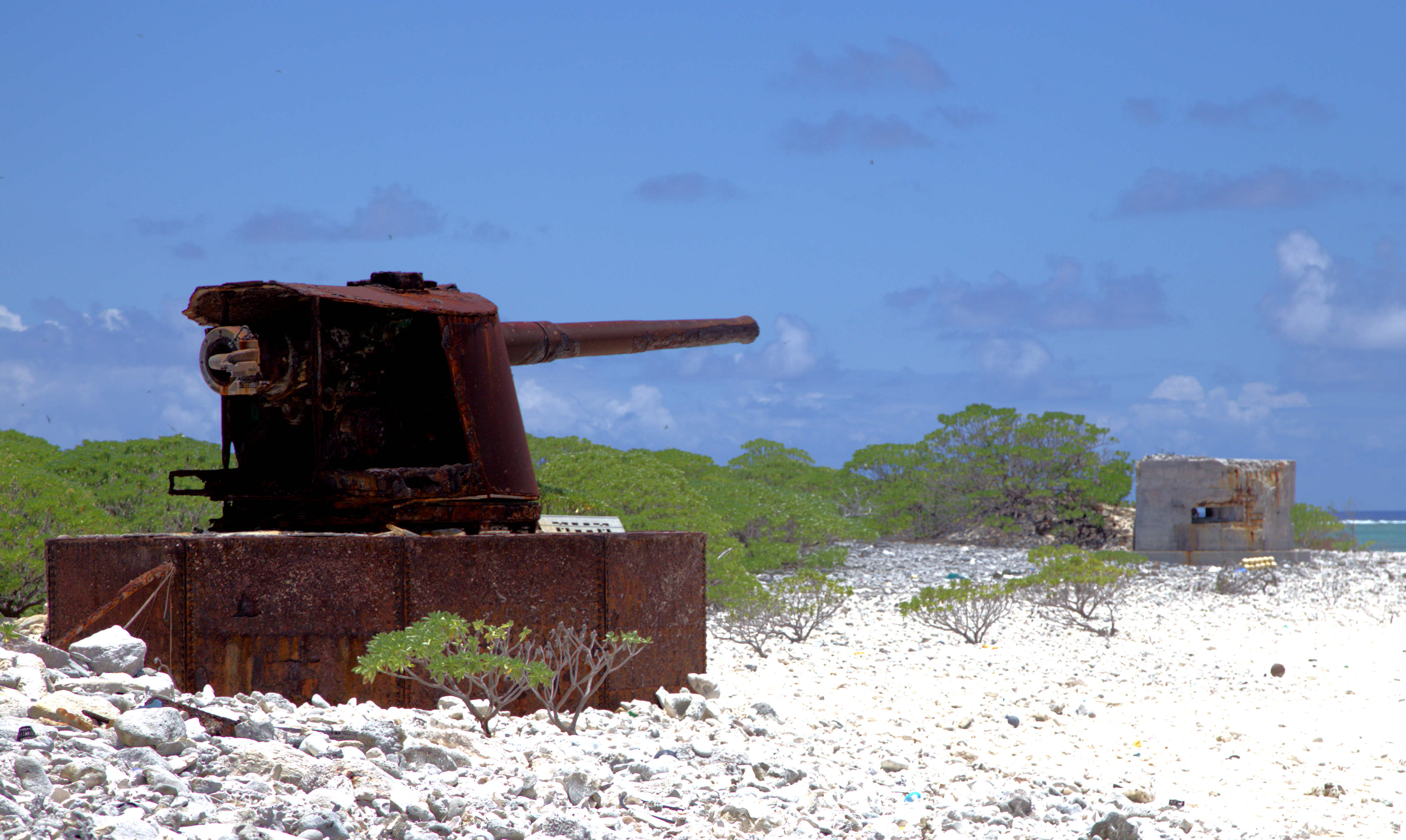
World War II gun emplacement in the 21st century

Historic items at the island include:

- Several old shipwrecks, including at least six vessels from World War II and the remains of several sailing vessels
- Bunkers and items from World War II US and Japanese military bases, such as pill boxes, bunkers, and gun emplacements
- Additional cultural items from prisoners of war, memorials, and other structures
- World War II aircraft underwater in the reefs

There is also danger of unexploded ordnance (UXO) on the atolls and submerged in reefs. The island was surveyed in 2010 for historical items and structures, and during that time, various UXOs were encountered and destroyed. One issue with many of the structures was that the salty sea air caused corrosion on the reinforced concrete buildings and gun emplacements.

In 2011, anthropological work discovered several more human remains on the island, at the site of the POW execution. The island was the initial burial site for American and Japanese dead from World War II. One of the issues with the human remains from the 1943 massacre was that they were buried, then dug up and reburied, then dug up again and reburied at Peacock Point in August 1945 in mass graves; those were exhumed yet again after the war and moved to the United States National Cemetery of the Pacific. At the national cemetery, both those who died during the battle for Wake or as POWs were interred and honored with a ceremony in 1953 in Hawaii.

There are many memorials to historic events on the island. Memorials and historical sites include the 98 rock, Nitro rock, Wake Defenders Memorial, Harry Morrison and Civilian Construction Memorial, Japanese Memorial, Historical Command Post, Historical Aircraft Revetments, 8" Peale Island Gun, Pan Am Hotel and seaplane base remains. The islands are also noted for nature, including about 40,000 birds of 12 different types. One of the noted locations is Drifter's Reef Bar for those stationed on the island.

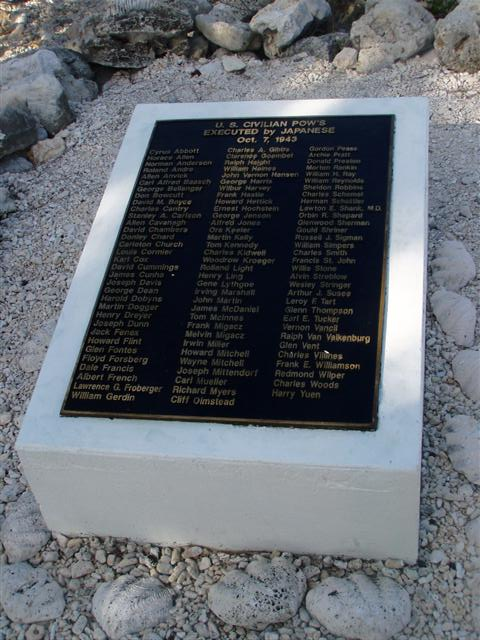
Civilian POW memorial

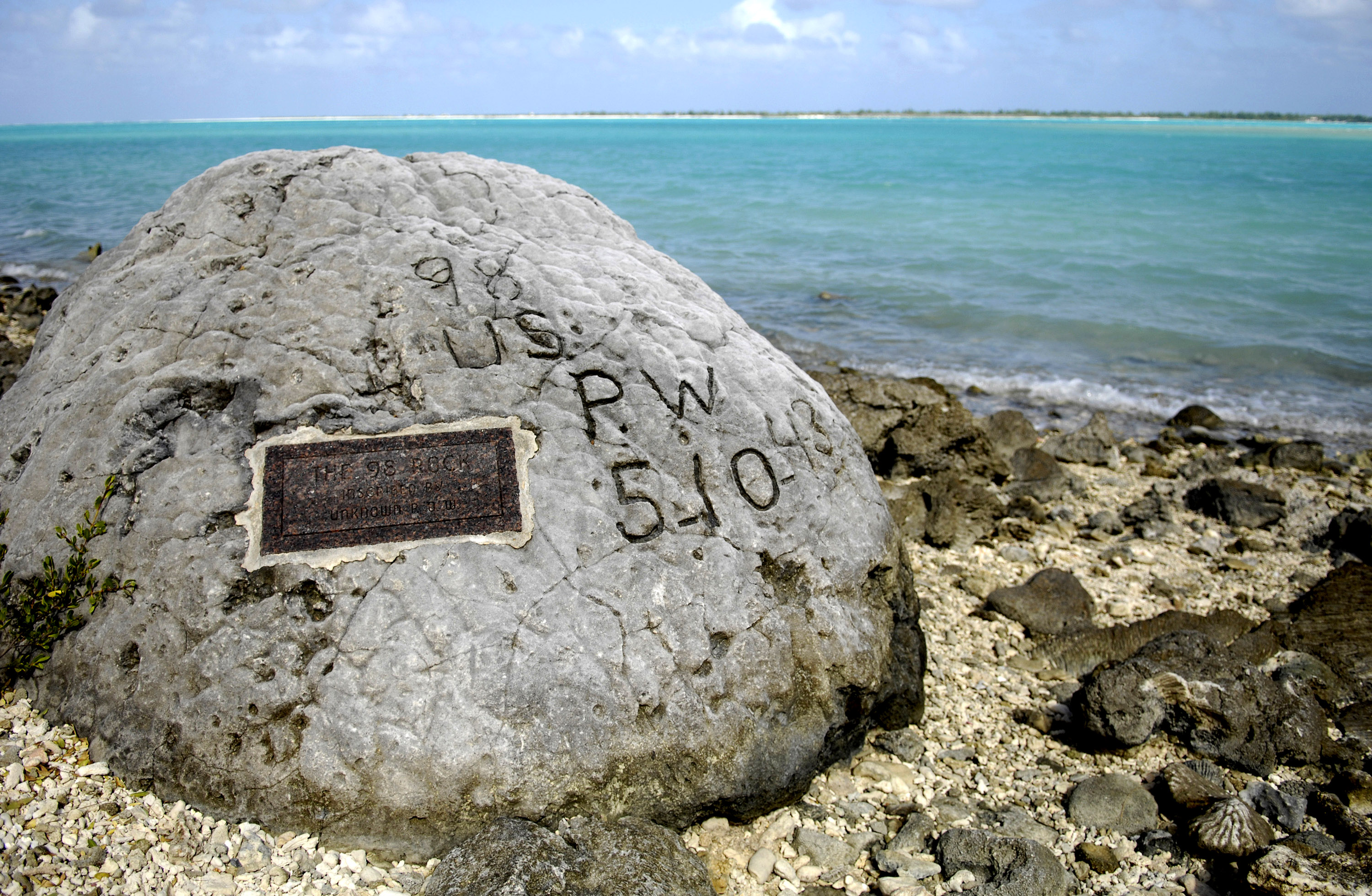
Rock inscribed by POW trying to record the POW massacre

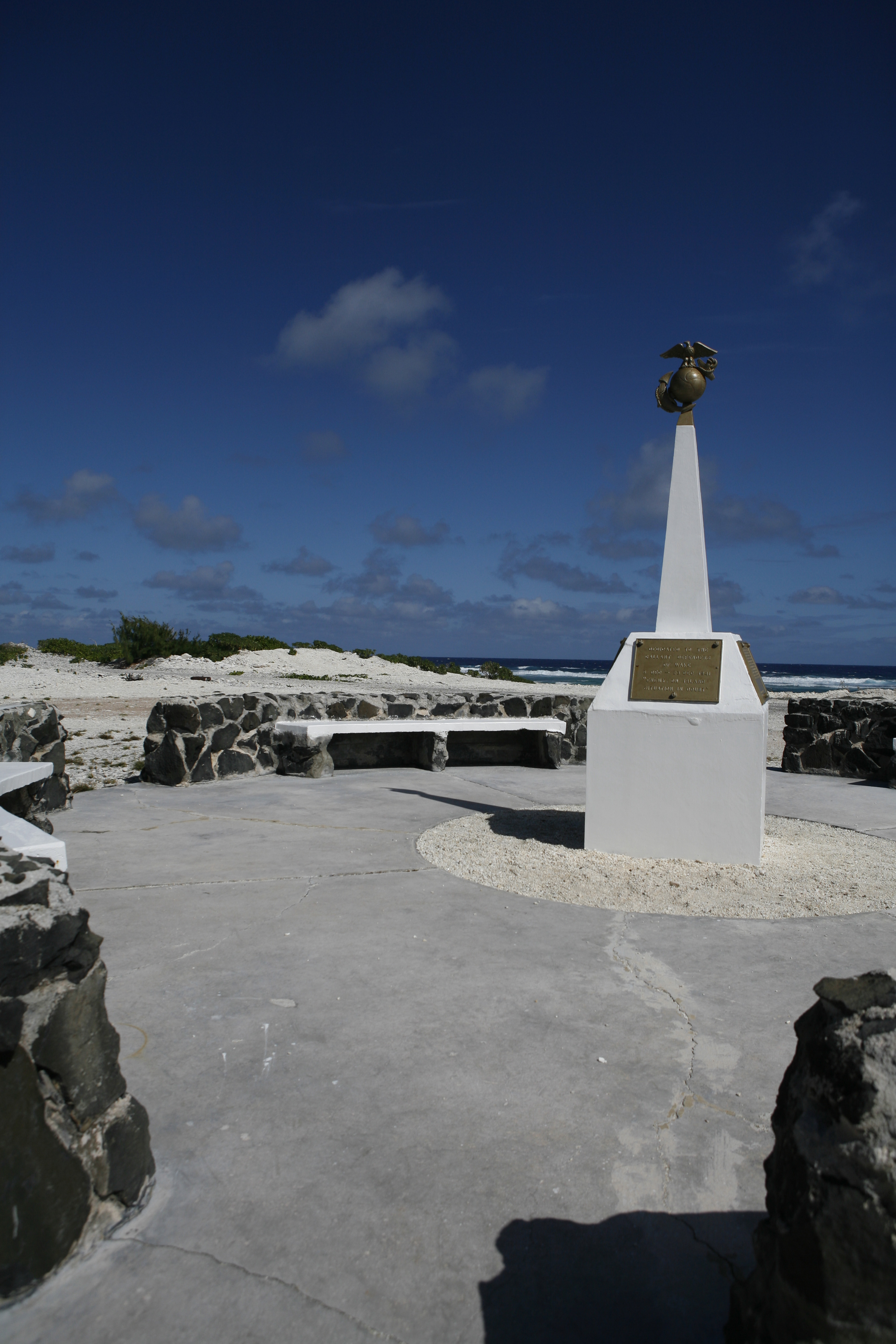
Memorial to the defenders of Wake in World War II

=== Shipwrecks ===
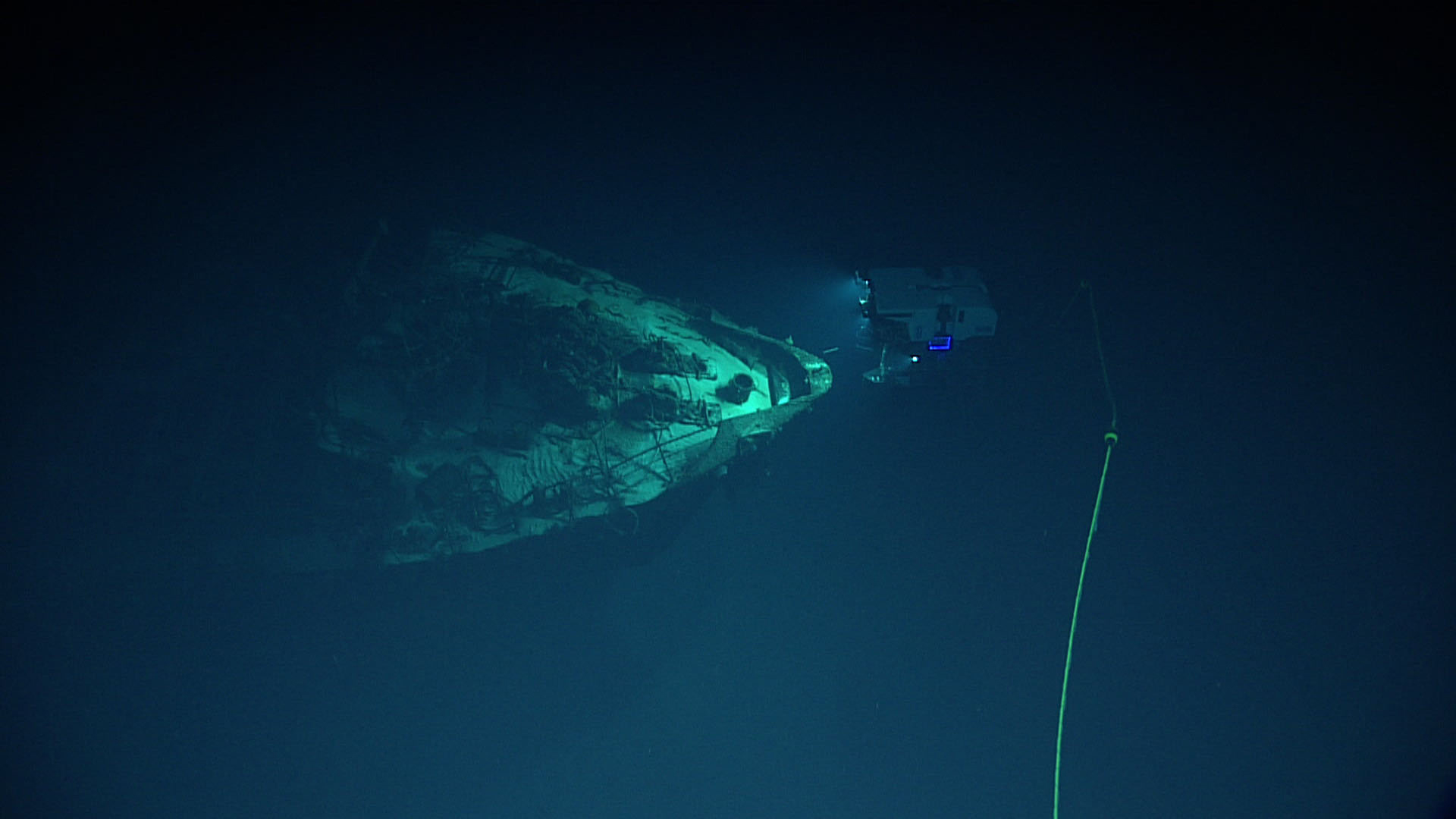
A sunken Japanese vessel near Wake atoll

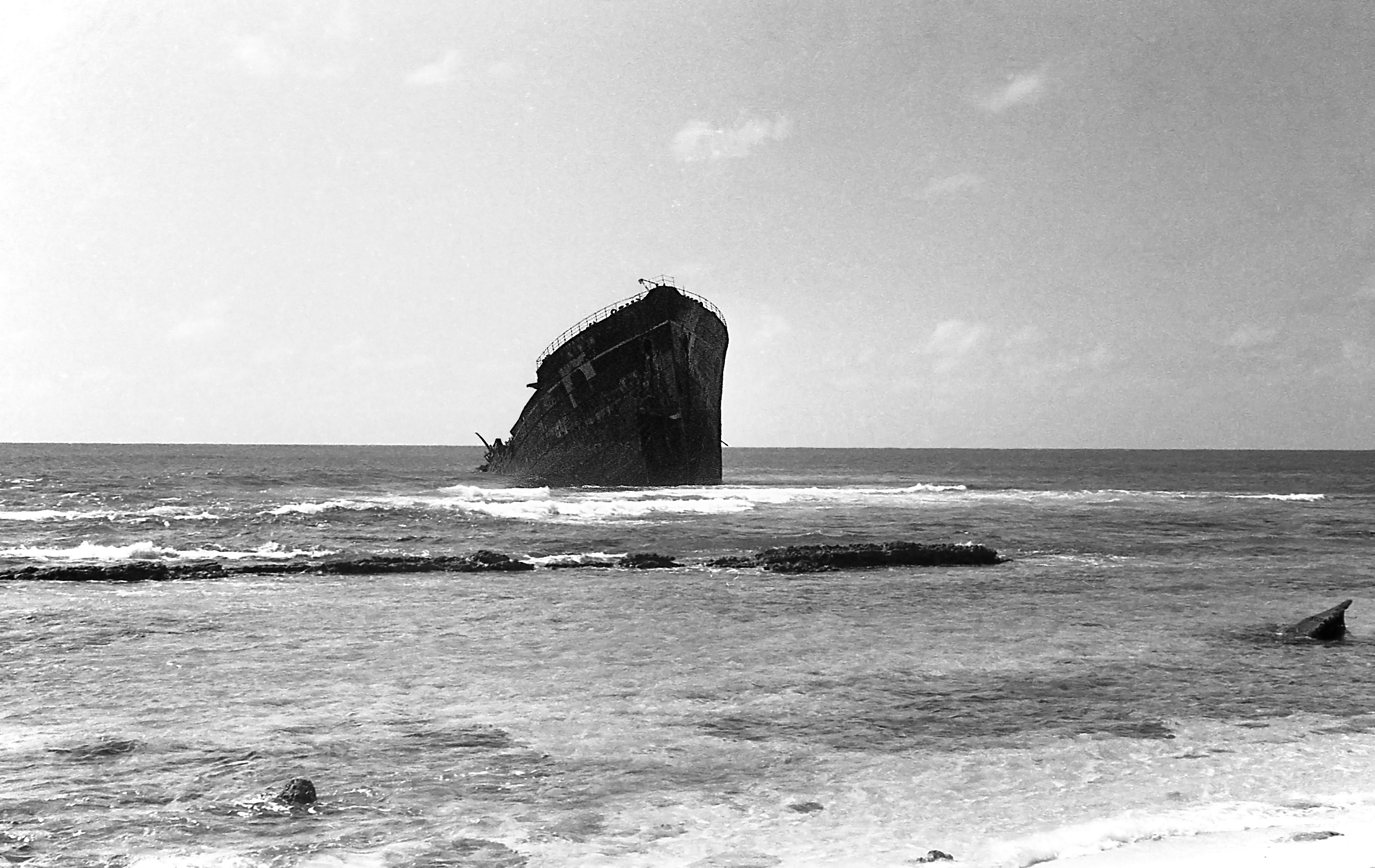
The Wreck of the Japanese Ship Suwa Maru, as seen in 1954

Shipwrecks on or very near Wake Atoll:

- 1866 Libelle
- August 31, 1870, the British tea clipper Dashing Wave
- December 8, 1941
  - Nisqually scow sunk in air attack
- December 11, 1941
  - Hayate, sunk by shore battery
  - Kisaragi sunk during attack by aircraft bomb
  - Japanese submarine sunk by aircraft near Wake
- December 23, 1941
  - Patrol Boat No. 32 (see No.31-class patrol boat)
  - Patrol Boat No. 33 (see No.31-class patrol boat)
- February 1942, three Japanese patrol boats were sunk, and a 4-engine patrol aircraft was shot down 5 miles east of Wake.
- Amaske Maru (sunk December 24, 1942)
- Suwa Maru (In March 1943, it was struck by a torpedo and grounded on the island, later destroyed)
- SS RC Stoner oil tanker, September 5, 1967 (ran aground)

In addition to shipwrecks, there are at least 21 World War II aircraft lost around Wake.

Another example of an air wreck is a USN Lockheed EC-130Q Hercules (156176) that crashed into the water 1.5 km (0.93 mi) from Wake on June 21, 1977, during its takeoff climb.

== See also ==
- USS Wake Island (US Ship named for Wake Island, commissioned during World War II)
