= Dynasty =

Sequence of rulers considered members of the same family

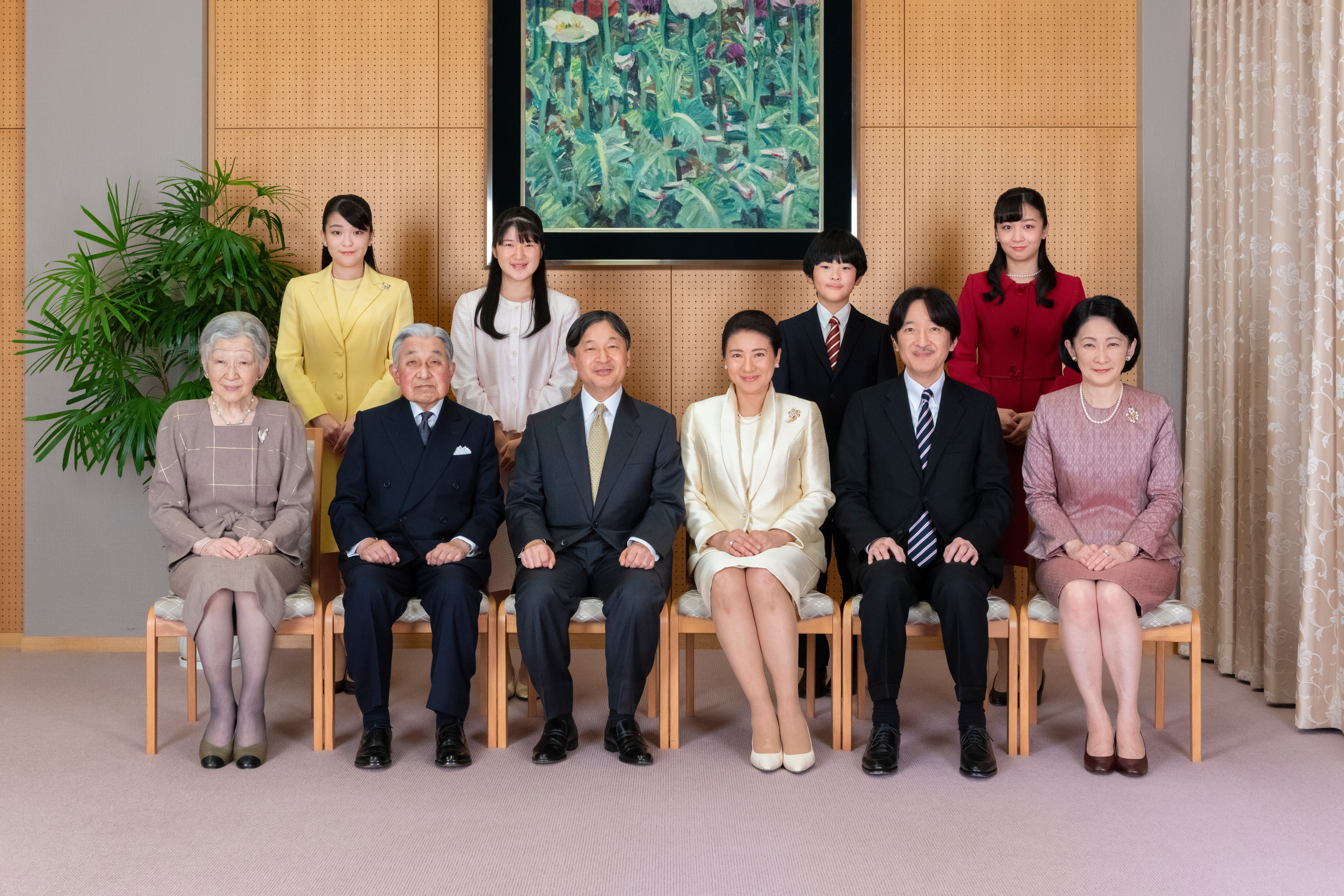
Family photograph of the Imperial House of Japan, the world's oldest continuous royal dynasty since at least the 5th century, with three generations (from left): Empress Michiko, Emperor Akihito, their son Emperor Naruhito and his consort Empress Masako, Crown Prince Akishino and Crown Princess Akishino, and behind them their children (2021)

A dynasty is a sequence of rulers from the same family. The term is typically used in the context of a monarchical system, but sometimes also appearing in republics. A "house" refers to a ruling royal or noble family.

== Terminology ==
The word "dynasty" (from the Greek: δυναστεία, dynasteía "power", "lordship", from dynástes "ruler") The Ancient Greek dynasteia referred to sovereignty in general, and was used to describe the rule of various petty rulers. Aristotle used it to refer to an oligarchical regime ruled by the best families. The historian Manetho used the term to refer to a series of kings.

The dynastic family or lineage may be known as a "noble house", which may be styled as "imperial", "royal", "princely", "ducal", "comital" or "baronial", depending upon the chief or present title borne by its members, but it is more often referred by adding the name afterwards, as in "House of Habsburg".

=== Dynast ===
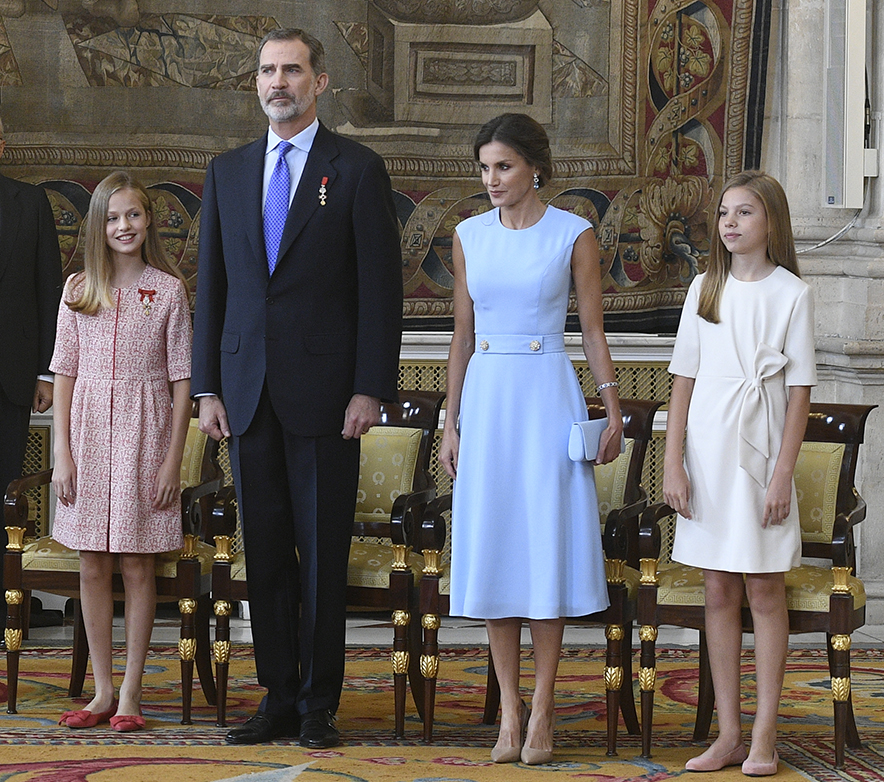
The Spanish royal family of the House of Bourbon dates its roots to the Capetian dynasty of the 9th century, thus making it the oldest still reigning dynasty in Europe (photograph of King Felipe VI, Queen Letizia, the Princess of Asturias and her younger sister Infanta Sofía, in 2019)

A ruler from a dynasty is sometimes referred to as a "dynast", but this term is also used to describe any member of a reigning family who retains a right to succeed to a throne.

The German aristocrat Prince Ernst August of Hanover, a male-line descendant of King George III, possesses no legal British name, titles or styles (although he is entitled to reclaim the former royal dukedom of Cumberland). He was born in the line of succession to the British throne and was bound by Britain's Royal Marriages Act 1772 until it was repealed when the Succession to the Crown Act 2013 took effect on 26 March 2015. Thus, he requested and obtained formal permission from Queen Elizabeth II to marry the Roman Catholic Princess Caroline of Monaco in 1999. Yet, a clause of the English Act of Settlement 1701 remained in effect at that time, stipulating that dynasts who marry Roman Catholics are considered "dead" for succession to the British throne. That exclusion, too, ceased to apply on 26 March 2015, with retroactive effect for those who had been dynasts before triggering it by marriage to a Roman Catholic.

=== Dynastic marriage ===
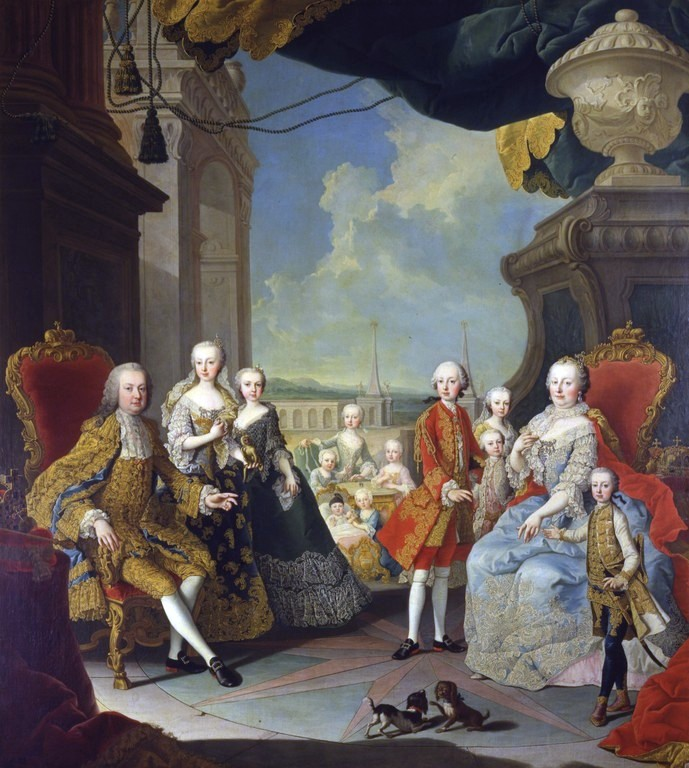
Family portrait of Empress Maria Theresa of the Habsburg dynasty, surrounded by her children who were married into various European dynasties. Marriage policy amongst dynasties led to the Pax Austriaca.

A "dynastic marriage" is one that complies with monarchical house law restrictions, so that the descendants are eligible to inherit the throne or other royal privileges. For example, the marriage of King Willem-Alexander of the Netherlands to Máxima Zorreguieta in 2002 was dynastic, making their eldest child, Princess Catharina-Amalia, the heir apparent to the Crown of the Netherlands. The marriage of his younger brother, Prince Friso of Orange-Nassau, in 2003 lacked government support and parliamentary approval. Thus, Prince Friso forfeited his place in the order of succession to the Dutch throne, and consequently lost his title as a "Prince of the Netherlands", and left his children without dynastic rights.

The Pragmatic Sanction of 1713 was an edict issued by Holy Roman Emperor Charles VI on 19 April 1713 to ensure that the Habsburg monarchy could be inherited by his daughter undivided (see agnatic-cognatic primogeniture). In 1736, Francis Stephen of Lorraine married Archduchess Maria Theresa of Austria, the sole heir of Emperor Charles VI. With the marriage of Maria Theresa, the only offspring of the House of Austria, she became together with her husband the founder of the new dynasty of the House of Habsburg-Lorraine. Since 1740 he was her co-regent in the Habsburg hereditary lands and from 1745 he was Holy Roman Emperor as Francis I, but was hardly involved in government affairs. Francis was as Duke of Lorraine the last non-Habsburg monarch of the Holy Roman Empire. The couple were the founders of the Habsburg-Lorraine dynasty, which ruled until 1918. Empress Maria Theresa of the Habsburg dynasty had her children married into various European dynasties. Habsburg marriage policy amongst European dynasties led to the Pax Austriaca.

Monarchies were based on the idea that power was best kept in families. Hereditary succession reduced the risk associated with a lack of a designated heir.

== Longevity ==
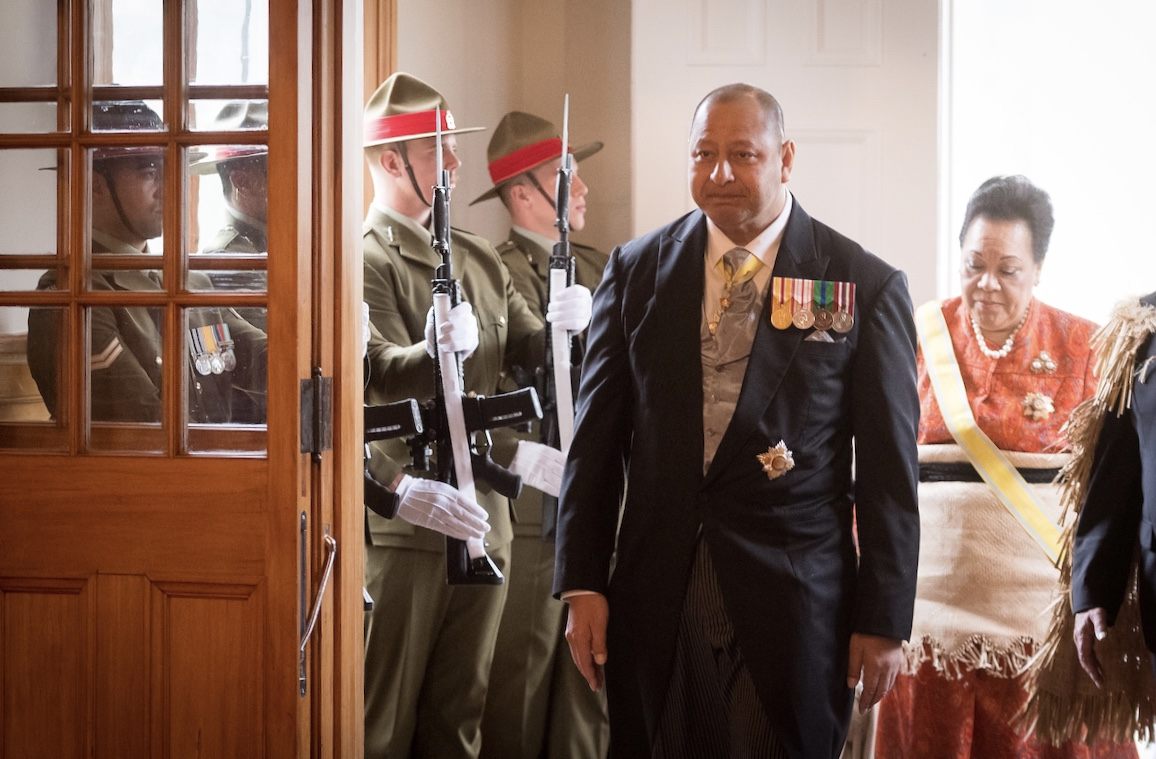
King Tupou VI of Tonga and Queen Nanasipau'u, head of one of the oldest still ruling royal dynasties in the world, dating back to c. 950 CE of the Tuʻi Tonga Empire

Dynasties lasting at least 200 years include the following.

Dynasty	Years ruled	Corrected length of rule	Notes
Pandya	c. 400 BCE – 1618 CE	c. 2018 years	Non-continuous; disappeared from historical record during Kalabhra dynasty rule from around 361–560 CE. Excluding the Kalabhra interlude, the Pandyas ruled for c. 1819 years.
Imperial House of Japan	c. 500 – present	c. 1,500+ years	Continuous, mostly ceremonial since 12th century; pre-500 CE emperors semi-legendary, exact start uncertain (Note: Emperor Jimmu is said to have founded the kingdom of Yamato in the year 660 BCE, but this is a much later tradition. In fact, the first Japanese written records date to the 8th century CE, over a thousand years later (see Kojiki and Nihon Shoki). The first attested emperor is Yūryaku, who lived c. 500 CE. He is attested in the Inariyama and Eta Funayama Swords, both made during reign of "the Great king Waka Takiru" (Wakatakeru). The first sword is dated to the "Year of the Metal Pig", which could mean 471 or 534.)
Wessex/England/United Kingdom	c. 520 – present	c. 1,500 years	Non-continuous; deposed in 1066, de facto interregnum 1649–1660; survived through marriages and cadet branches (Note: Cerdic of Wessex is ultimately the ancestor of all English and British monarchs, since Henry I's wife, Margaret, was a granddaughter of Edward the Exile (see Family tree of English monarchs).)
Guhila / Sisodia	c. 525 – 1971	c. 1,500 years	Agnatic dynasty of the Kingdom of Mewar; ceremonial after 1949
Chera	c. 200 BCE – 1100 CE	c. 1,300 years	Estimation; fragmented early records, gaps likely
Velir	c. 50–1300; 1400–1751; 1803–1948	c. 1,250 years	Non-continuous; independently ruling Malyaman branch ended in 1300 CE; surviving descendant Pari family ceremonial under British paramountcy (dynasty ruled for 1,746 years)
Tonga	c. 950 – present	c. 1,075 years	Estimation; title changed in 1865, now constitutional
Capetian	987–present	1,038 years	Continuous through cadet branches (e.g., Bourbon); active in Spain
Bagrationi	780–1801	c. 1,021 years	Georgian royal house; ended with Russian annexation
Silla	57 BCE – 935 CE	992 years	Korean kingdom; estimate for early start
Adaside	c. 1700 – 722 BCE	978 years	Neo-Assyrian period; estimation
Eastern Ganga	498–1434	c. 936 years	Odisha rulers; diminished after 1434
Baduspanids	665–1598	933 years	Rulers of Tabaristan
Chola	c. 300 BCE – 200 CE; 848–1279 CE	c. 929 years	Non-continuous; interregnum c. 200–848; early period semi-legendary
Borjigin	c. 1130–1930	c. 800 years	Continuous through cadet branches (e.g., Taichiud, Tughlugh-Timurids); rulers of the Mongol Empire and successor states
Zhou	1046–256 BCE	790 years	Nominal rule in later Warring States period; traditional dates
Abbasid	750–1258, 1261–1517	764 years	Non-continuous; caliphal rule, ceremonial after 1258
Rurikid	862–1598	736 years	Kievan Rus' to Tsardom of Russia
Sayfawa	c. 1085 – 1846	c. 761 years	Kanem–Bornu Empire; estimation
Grimaldi	1297–present	729 years	Reigning Princes of Monaco
Goguryeo	37 BCE – 668 CE	705 years	Korean kingdom; well documented
Solomon	1270–1975	705 years	Ethiopian emperors; restored in 1270
Bavand dynasty	651–1349	698 years	Rulers of Tabaristan
Kachhwaha	1128–1818	690 years	Jaipur rajputs; effective rule ended with British control
Bolkiah	c. 1360 – present	c. 665 years	Sultans of Brunei; estimation for early start
Ottoman	1299–1922	623 years	Sultans of the eponymous beylik, later empire
Vijaya	543 BCE – 66 CE	609 years	Sri Lankan kings; traditional dates
Ahom	1228–1826	598 years	Assamese kingdom
Oldenburg	1448–present	577 years	Danish/Norwegian monarchs; active in Denmark
Rathore	1243–1818	575 years	Marwar/Jodhpur rajputs; ended with British control
Bohkti	c. 1330 – 1855	c. 525 years	Kurdish principality; adjusted start date
Joseon and Korean Empire	1392–1910	518 years	Korean rulers
Habsburg	1278–1780	502 years	Agnatic line; all are extinct after the death of Maria Theresa.
Shang	1600–1046 BCE	496 years	Chinese royal rulers
Goryeo	918–1392	474 years	Korean kingdom
Arsacid	247 BCE – 224 CE	471 years	Parthian Empire
Nabhani	1154–1624	470 years	Omani imams
Han and Shu Han	202 BCE – 9 CE, 25–220 CE	448 years	Non-continuous; Chinese emperors
Árpád	858–1301	443 years	Kings of Hungary
Mataram	1586–present	c. 439 years	Indonesian sultans; estimation for continuity
Přemyslid	870–1306	c. 436 years	Czech dukes and kings of Bohemia
Sassanian	224–651	427 years	Persian Empire
Davidic	c. 1010–586 BCE	c. 424 years	Kingdom of Judah; traditional dates
Jafnid	220–638	418 years	Arab kingdom
Piast	960–1370	410 years	Dukes and kings of Poland
Argead	c. 700 – 309 BCE	c. 391 years	Macedonian kings; adjusted start
Copán	426–810	384 years	Maya city-state
Siri Sanga Bo	1220–1597	377 years	Kandy kingdom, Sri Lanka
Umayyad	661–750, 756–1031	364 years	Non-continuous; caliphs
Yuan and Northern Yuan	1271–1635	364 years	Mongol China
Komnenos	1057–1059, 1081–1185, 1204–1461	363 years	Byzantine emperors; non-continuous
Later Lê (Primitive and Revival Lê)	1428–1527, 1533–1789	355 years	Vietnamese emperors; non-continuous
Estridsen	1047–1375, 1387–1412	353 years	Kings of Denmark; non-continuous
Aryacakravarti	1277–1619	342 years	Jaffna kingdom
Lakhmid	c. 268–602	c. 334 years	Arab kingdom
Stuart	1371–1651, 1660–1714	334 years	Scottish/British monarchs; de jure continuous
Mughal	1526–1857	331 years	Mughal Empire; cadet branch of Timurid dynasty
Plantagenet	1154–1485	331 years	Kings of England
Jiménez	905–1234	329 years	Monarchs of Navarre and Aragon
Bendahara	1699–present	c. 326 years	Pahang/Malaysia sultans; estimation
Song	960–1279	319 years	Chinese emperors
Romanov	1613–1917	304 years	Tsars of Russia
Liao and Western Liao	916–1218	302 years	Khitan rulers
Later Jin and Qing	1616–1912	296 years	Jurchen/Manchu emperors of China
Ming and Southern Ming	1368–1662	294 years	Chinese emperors
Babenberg	962–1246	284 years	Dukes of Austria
Ptolemaic	305–30 BCE	275 years	Final (Hellenistic) dynasty of independent Egypt
Tang	618–690, 705–907	274 years	Chinese emperors; non-continuous
Fatimid	909–1171	262 years	Caliphs
Nasrid	1230–1492	262 years	Emirs of Granada
Rajasa	1222–1478	256 years	Javanese rulers
Thutmosid	c. 1550 – c. 1295 BCE	c. 255 years	Eighteenth Dynasty of Egyptian pharaohs
Dunkeld	1034–1286	252 years	Kings of Scotland
Karaman	1255-1501	246 years	Sultans of eponymous Turkish state
Bubastite	c. 945 – c. 715 BCE	c. 230 years	Twenty-second Dynasty of Egyptian pharaohs
Bubastite	c. 945 – c. 715 BCE	c. 230 years	Twenty-second Dynasty of Egyptian pharaohs
Achaemenid	550–330 BCE	220 years	Persian Empire; adjusted start
Bernadotte	1818–present	208 years	Swedish monarchs; Norwegian monarchs 1818–1905

== Extant sovereign dynasties ==
There are 43 sovereign states with a monarch as head of state, of which 41 are ruled by dynasties. (Note: Existing sovereign entities ruled by non-dynastic monarchs include: Principality of Andorra; Holy See (ruling the Vatican City State); Sovereign Military Hospitaller Order of Saint John of Jerusalem, of Rhodes and Malta) There are currently 26 sovereign dynasties.

Dynasty	Realm	Reigning monarch	Dynastic founder (Note: The founder of a dynasty need not necessarily equate to the first monarch of a particular realm. For example, while William I was the dynastic founder of the House of Orange-Nassau, which currently rules over the Kingdom of the Netherlands, he was never a monarch of the Kingdom of the Netherlands.)	Dynastic place of origin (Note: Not to be confused with dynastic seat.)
Windsor (Note: The House of Windsor is descended from the House of Saxe-Coburg and Gotha, which is a branch of the House of Wettin. The dynastic name was changed from "Saxe-Coburg and Gotha" to "Windsor" in 1917.) (Note: A sovereign state with Charles III as its monarch and head of state is known as a Commonwealth realm.)	Antigua and Barbuda	King Charles III	King-Emperor George V (Note: George V was formerly a member of the House of Saxe-Coburg and Gotha before 1917.)	Thuringia and Bavaria (in modern Germany)
Windsor	Commonwealth of Australia (Note: Including: Australian Antarctic Territory; Coral Sea Islands Territory; Territory of Ashmore and Cartier Islands; Christmas Island; Territory of Cocos (Keeling) Islands; Territory of Heard and McDonald Islands; Norfolk Island)	King Charles III	King-Emperor George V	Thuringia and Bavaria (in modern Germany)
Windsor	Bahamas	King Charles III	King-Emperor George V	Thuringia and Bavaria (in modern Germany)
Windsor	Belize	King Charles III	King-Emperor George V	Thuringia and Bavaria (in modern Germany)
Windsor	Canada	King Charles III	King-Emperor George V	Thuringia and Bavaria (in modern Germany)
Windsor	Grenada	King Charles III	King-Emperor George V	Thuringia and Bavaria (in modern Germany)
Windsor	Jamaica	King Charles III	King-Emperor George V	Thuringia and Bavaria (in modern Germany)
Windsor	New Zealand (Note: The Realm of New Zealand consists of: Cook Islands; New Zealand; Niue; Ross Dependency; Tokelau)	King Charles III	King-Emperor George V	Thuringia and Bavaria (in modern Germany)
Windsor	Papua New Guinea	King Charles III	King-Emperor George V	Thuringia and Bavaria (in modern Germany)
Windsor	Saint Kitts and Nevis	King Charles III	King-Emperor George V	Thuringia and Bavaria (in modern Germany)
Windsor	Saint Lucia	King Charles III	King-Emperor George V	Thuringia and Bavaria (in modern Germany)
Windsor	Saint Vincent and the Grenadines	King Charles III	King-Emperor George V	Thuringia and Bavaria (in modern Germany)
Windsor	Solomon Islands	King Charles III	King-Emperor George V	Thuringia and Bavaria (in modern Germany)
Windsor	Tuvalu	King Charles III	King-Emperor George V	Thuringia and Bavaria (in modern Germany)
Windsor	United Kingdom (Note: Including: Anguilla; Bailiwick of Guernsey (Crown dependency); Bailiwick of Jersey (Crown dependency); Bermuda; British Antarctic Territory; British Indian Ocean Territory; Cayman Islands; Falkland Islands; Gibraltar; Isle of Man (Crown dependency); Montserrat; Pitcairn, Henderson, Ducie and Oeno Islands; Saint Helena, Ascension and Tristan da Cunha; South Georgia and the South Sandwich Islands; Akrotiri and Dhekelia; Turks and Caicos Islands; British Virgin Islands; The crown dependencies of the Bailiwick of Guernsey, the Bailiwick of Jersey, and the Isle of Man are neither part of the United Kingdom nor British overseas territories.)	King Charles III	King-Emperor George V	Thuringia and Bavaria (in modern Germany)
Khalifa	Bahrain	King Hamad bin Isa Al Khalifa	Sheikh Khalifa bin Mohammed	Najd (in modern Saudi Arabia)
Belgium (Note: The House of Belgium is descended from the House of Saxe-Coburg and Gotha, which is a branch of the House of Wettin. The dynastic name was changed from "Saxe-Coburg and Gotha" to "Belgium" in 1920.)	Belgium	King Philippe	King Albert I (Note: Albert I was formerly a member of the House of Saxe-Coburg and Gotha before 1920.)	Thuringia and Bavaria (in modern Germany)
Wangchuck	Bhutan	Druk Gyalpo Jigme Khesar Namgyel Wangchuck	Druk Gyalpo Ugyen Wangchuck	Trongsa, Bhutan
Bolkiah	Brunei	Sultan Hassanal Bolkiah	Sultan Muhammad Shah	Tarim in Hadhramaut (Note: Claimed by the royal house, but the historicity is questionable.) (in modern Yemen)
Norodom (Note: The House of Norodom is a branch of the Varman dynasty.)	Cambodia	King Norodom Sihamoni	King Norodom Prohmbarirak	Cambodia
Glücksburg (Note: The House of Schleswig-Holstein-Sonderburg-Glücksburg is a branch of the House of Oldenburg.)	Denmark (Note: The Danish Realm consists of: Denmark; Faroe Islands; Greenland)	King Frederik X	Friedrich Wilhelm, Duke of Schleswig-Holstein-Sonderburg-Glücksburg	Glücksburg (in modern Germany)
Glücksburg	Norway (Note: Including: Bouvet Island; Jan Mayen; Peter I Island; Queen Maud Land; Svalbard)	Haakon VIII	Friedrich Wilhelm, Duke of Schleswig-Holstein-Sonderburg-Glücksburg	Glücksburg (in modern Germany)
Dlamini	Eswatini	King Mswati III	Chief Dlamini I	East Africa
Yamato (Note: The Imperial House of Japan, or Kōshitsu (皇室), is the world's oldest continuous dynasty. The dynasty has produced an unbroken succession of Japanese monarchs since the legendary founding year of 660 BCE.)	Japan	Emperor Naruhito	Emperor Jimmu (Note: Most historians regard Emperor Jimmu to have been a mythical ruler. Emperor Ōjin, traditionally considered the 15th emperor, is the first who is generally thought to have existed, while Emperor Kinmei, the 29th emperor according to traditional historiography, is the first monarch for whom verifiable regnal dates can be assigned.)	Nara (in modern Japan)
Hashim (Note: The House of Hashim is descended from Banu Qatada, which was a branch of the House of Ali.)	Jordan	King Abdullah II	King Hussein ibn Ali al-Hashimi	Hejaz (in modern Saudi Arabia)
Sabah	Kuwait	Emir Mishal Al-Ahmad Al-Jaber Al-Sabah	Sheikh Sabah I bin Jaber	Najd (in modern Saudi Arabia)
Moshesh	Lesotho	King Letsie III	Paramount Chief Moshoeshoe I	Lesotho
Liechtenstein	Liechtenstein	Prince Hans-Adam II	Prince Karl I	Lower Austria (in modern Austria)
Luxembourg-Nassau (Note: The House of Luxembourg-Nassau is descended from the House of Nassau-Weilburg, which is a branch of the House of Nassau and the House of Bourbon-Parma.)	Luxembourg	Grand Duke Guillaume V	Grand Duke Adolphe	Nassau (in modern Germany)
Temenggong (Note: The Temenggong dynasty is the ruling dynasty of Johor and a cadet branch of the Bendahara dynasty. The Sultan of Johor is the reigning Yang di-Pertuan Agong of Malaysia.)	Malaysia (Note: The throne of Malaysia rotates among the nine constituent monarchies of Malaysia, each ruled by a dynasty. The Yang di-Pertuan Agong is elected by the Conference of Rulers.)	Sultan Ibrahim III	Sultan Abu Bakar	Johor (in modern Malaysia)
Grimaldi	Monaco	Prince Albert II	François Grimaldi	Genoa (in modern Italy)
Alawi	Morocco	King Mohammed VI	Sultan Abul Amlak Sidi Muhammad as-Sharif ibn 'Ali	Tafilalt (in modern Morocco)
Orange-Nassau (Note: The House of Orange-Nassau is a branch of the House of Nassau. Additionally, Willem-Alexander is also linked to the House of Lippe through Beatrix of the Netherlands.)	Netherlands (Note: The Kingdom of the Netherlands consists of: Aruba; Curaçao; Netherlands; Sint Maarten)	King Willem-Alexander	Prince William I	Nassau (in modern Germany)
Busaid	Oman	Sultan Haitham bin Tariq	Sultan Ahmad bin Said al-Busaidi	Oman
Thani	Qatar	Emir Tamim bin Hamad Al Thani	Sheikh Thani bin Mohammed	Najd (in modern Saudi Arabia)
Saud	Saudi Arabia	King Salman bin Abdulaziz Al Saud	Emir Saud I	Diriyah (in modern Saudi Arabia)
Bourbon-Anjou (Note: The House of Bourbon-Anjou is a branch of the House of Bourbon.)	Spain	King Felipe VI	King Philip V	Bourbon-l'Archambault (in modern France)
Bernadotte	Sweden	King Carl XVI Gustaf	King Charles XIV John	Pau (in modern France)
Chakri	Thailand	King Vajiralongkorn	King Rama I	Phra Nakhon Si Ayutthaya (in modern Thailand)
Tupou	Tonga	King Tupou VI	King George Tupou I	Tonga
Nahyan (Note: The House of Nahyan is the ruling dynasty of the Emirate of Abu Dhabi. The Emir of Abu Dhabi is the incumbent President of the United Arab Emirates.)	United Arab Emirates (Note: The President of the United Arab Emirates is elected by the Federal Supreme Council. The office has been held by the Emir of Abu Dhabi since the formation of the United Arab Emirates in 1971.)	President Mohamed bin Zayed Al Nahyan	Sheikh Dhiyab bin Isa Al Nahyan	Liwa Oasis (in modern United Arab Emirates)

== Political families ==
A political family (also referred to as a political dynasty) is a family in which multiple members are involved in politics, particularly electoral politics. Members may be related by blood or marriage; often several generations or multiple siblings may be involved. Political families often enjoy significant advantages in electoral competition and cabinet appointments, though this varies both over time and across countries. In politics, power has been passed down in families throughout recorded history. This was a common feature of monarchies, but in recent times this phenomenon has also been observed in democratic republics. Political families often exercise a lot of political authority, and in many cases can affect participation in government processes.

=== Hereditary dictatorship ===
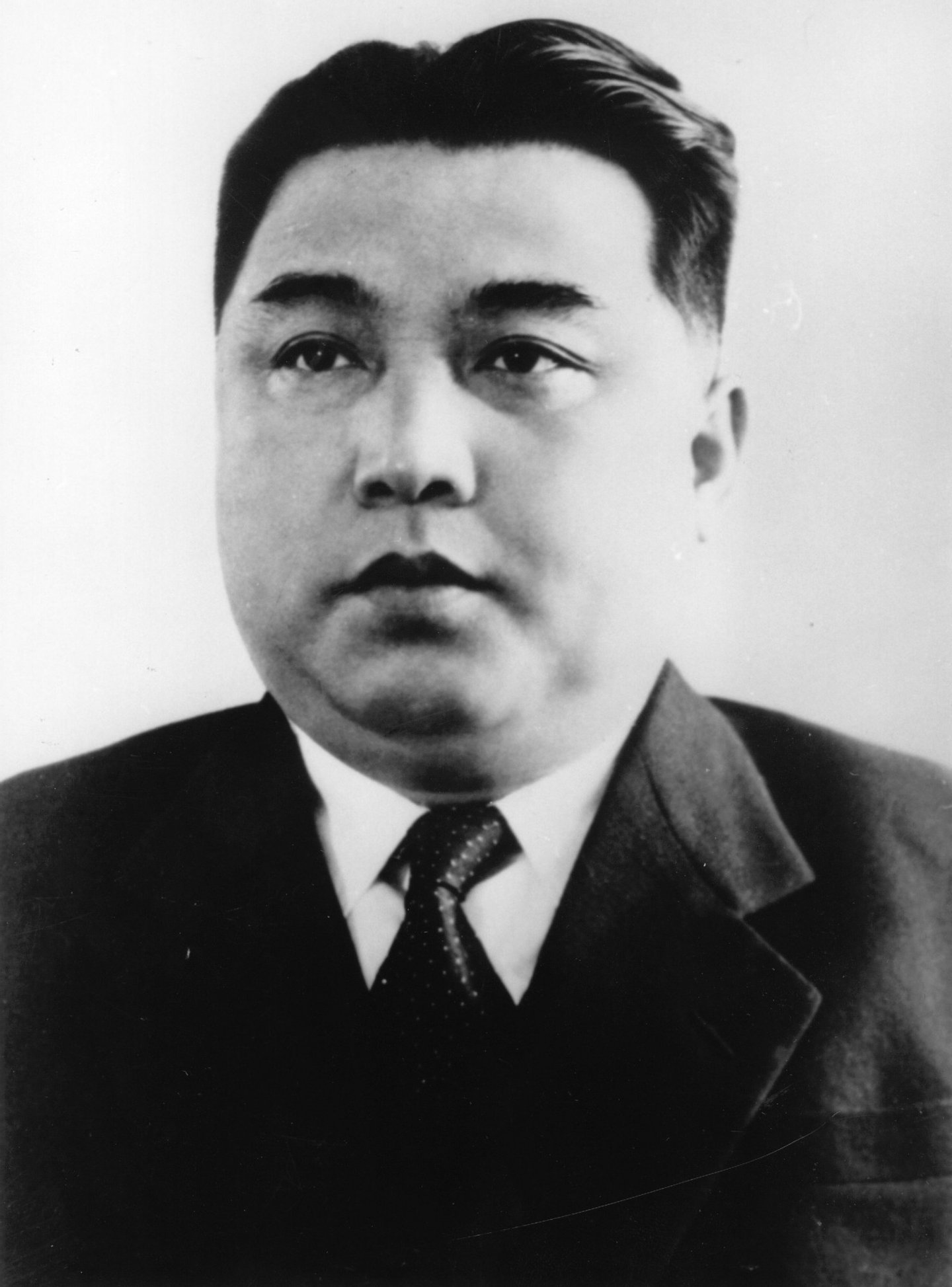
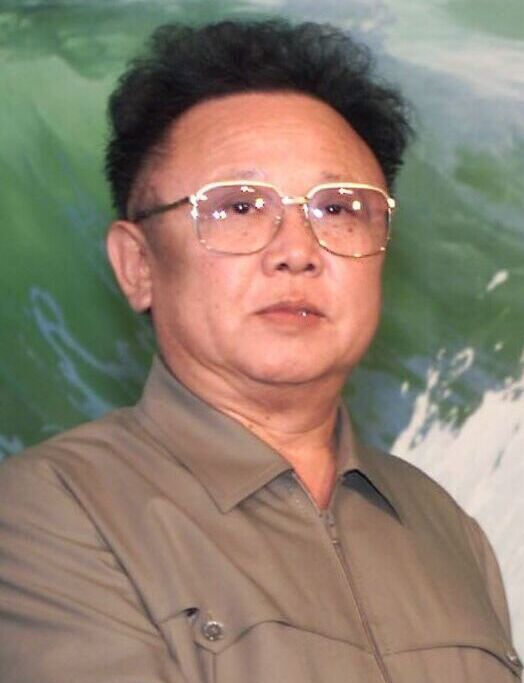
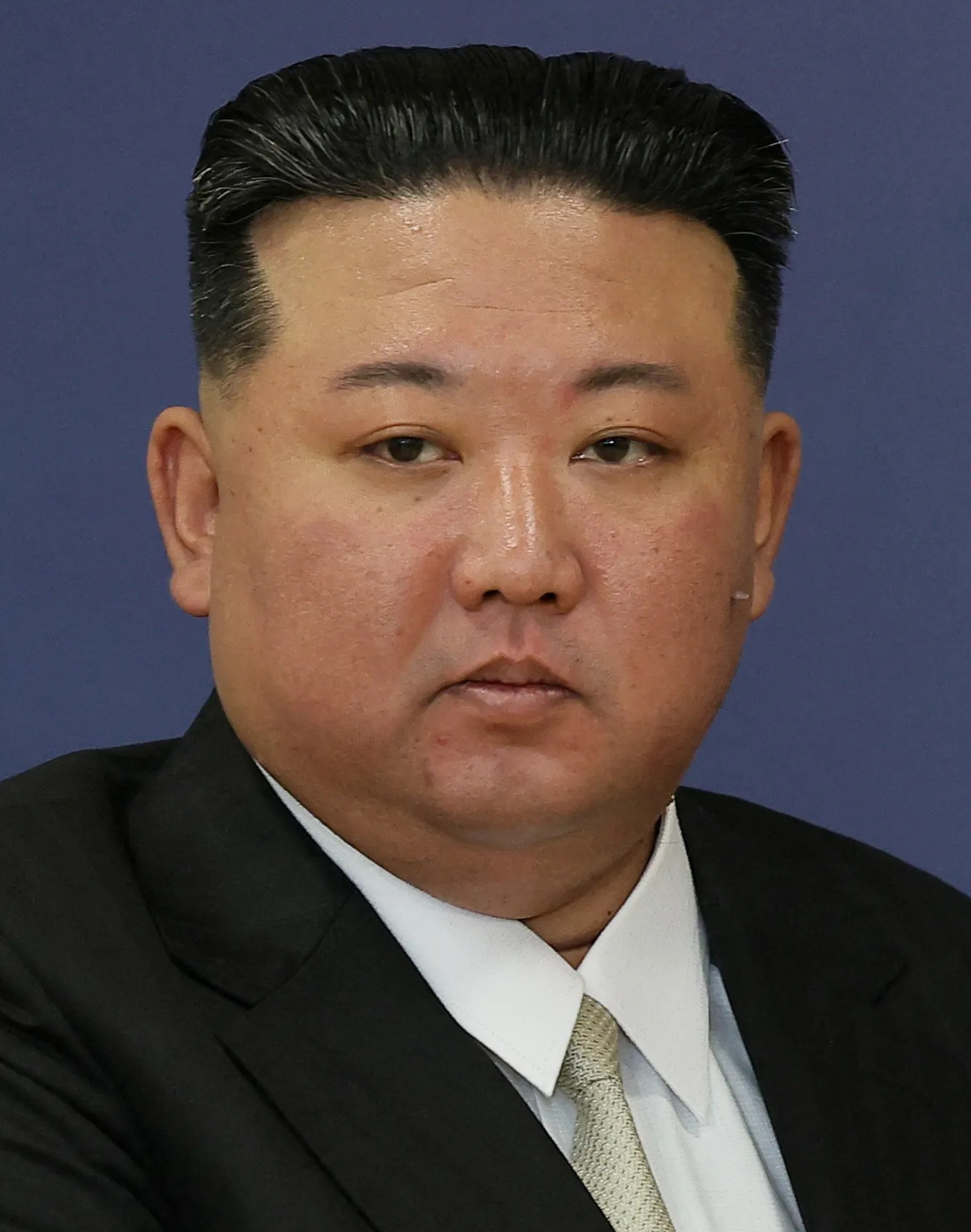
North Korea's three supreme leaders, from left to right: Kim Il Sung, Kim Jong Il, and Kim Jong Un. All three are members of the Kim family, which has ruled North Korea since 1948, for three generations.

Hereditary dictatorships are characterized by the dictator keeping political power within their family due to personal choice. The successor may be groomed during their lifetime, as was the case for Bashar al-Assad and his brother Bassel, or a member of their family may manoeuvre to take control of the dictatorship after the dictator's death, similar to the case of Ramfis Trujillo.

Current hereditary dictatorships
Dynasty	Regime	Dynastic founder	Current leader	Year founded (Note: Year authoritarian system began)	Length of rule
Kim family	North Korea	Kim Il Sung	Kim Jong Un	1946	78 years, 286 days
Gnassingbé family	Togo	Gnassingbé Eyadéma	Faure Gnassingbé	1967	59 years, 221 days
Bongo family	Gabon	Omar Bongo	Brice Oligui Nguema (Note: maternal cousin of Ali Bongo)	1967	58 years, 358 days
Nguema family	Equatorial Guinea	Francisco Macías Nguema	Teodoro Obiang Nguema Mbasogo	1968	58 years, 40 days
Gouled-Guelleh family	Djibouti	Hassan Gouled Aptidon	Ismaïl Omar Guelleh	1977	49 years, 147 days
Hun family	Cambodia	Hun Sen	Hun Manet	1985	41 years, 311 days
Déby family	Chad	Idriss Déby	Mahamat Déby	1991	35 years, 266 days
Aliyev family	Azerbaijan	Heydar Aliyev	Ilham Aliyev	1993	33 years, 150 days
Berdimuhamedow family	Turkmenistan	Gurbanguly Berdimuhamedow	Serdar Berdimuhamedow	2006	19 years, 335 days

Former hereditary dictatorships
Dynasty	Regime	Dynastic founder	Last leader	Year founded	Year ended	Length of rule
Cromwell family	Great Britain	Oliver Cromwell	Richard Cromwell	1653	1659	5 years, 150 days
López family	Paraguay	Carlos Antonio López	Francisco Solano López	1844	1870	25 years, 293 days
Rana family	Nepal	Jung Bahadur Rana	Mohan Shumsher Jung Bahadur Rana	1846	1951	105 years, 58 days
Meléndez–Quiñónez family	El Salvador	Carlos Meléndez	Alfonso Quiñónez Molina	1913	1927	14 years, 20 days
Chiang family (Note: Chiang Kai-shek position was briefly occupied by Li Zongren between 1949 and 1950, his son, Chiang Ching-kuo served as his premier in 1972 until his death in 1975, Chiang Ching-kuo would later took the presidency of Yen Chia-kan after both finished serving their terms as President and Premier)	Taiwan (Note: Taiwan between 1949 and 1988.)	Chiang Kai-shek	Chiang Ching-kuo	1928	1988	59 years, 95 days
Trujillo family	Dominican Republic	Rafael Trujillo	Ramfis Trujillo	1930	1961	31 years, 93 days
Somoza family	Nicaragua	Anastasio Somoza García	Anastasio Somoza Debayle	1936	1979	43 years, 39 days
Duvalier family	Haiti	François Duvalier	Jean-Claude Duvalier	1957	1986	28 years, 108 days
Castro family	Cuba	Fidel Castro	Raul Castro	1959	2021	62 years, 62 days
Arif family	Iraq	Abdul Salam Arif	Abdul Rahman Arif	1963	1968	5 years, 160 days
Assad family	Syria	Hafez al-Assad	Bashar al-Assad	1971	2024	53 years, 269 days
Bagaza-Buyoya family	Burundi	Jean-Baptiste Bagaza	Pierre Buyoya	1976	1993	16 years, 251 days
Kabila family	DR Congo	Laurent-Désiré Kabila	Joseph Kabila	1997	2019	21 years, 252 days

== See also ==
- Cadet branch
- Commonwealth realm
- Conquest dynasty
- Dynastic cycle
- Dynastic order
- Dynastic union
- Elective monarchy
- Family seat
- Heads of former ruling families
- Hereditary monarchy
- List of current constituent monarchs
- List of current monarchies
- List of current monarchs of sovereign states
- List of dynasties
- List of empires
- List of kingdoms and royal dynasties
- List of largest empires
- List of monarchies
- List of noble houses
- Non-sovereign monarchy
- Royal family
- Royal household
- Royal intermarriage
- Self-proclaimed monarchy
- Political family
