= Magnet.me =

AI-powered career network

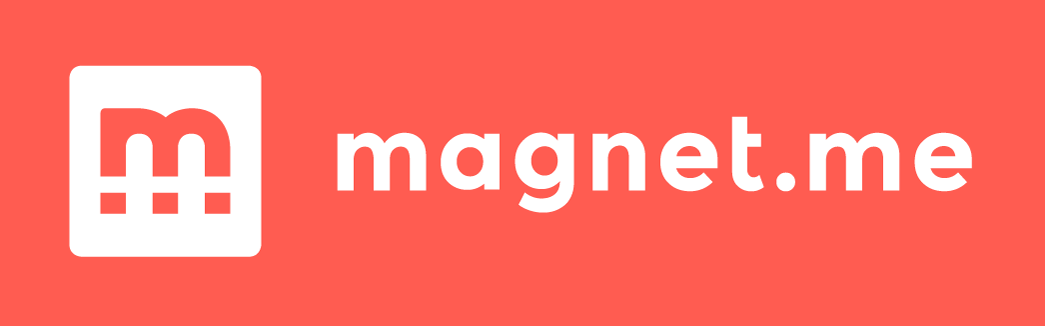
- Magnet.me Logo
- Company type: Scaleup
- Available in: Dutch, English
- Founded: 2012; 14 years ago
- Headquarters: Rotterdam, {{{location_country}}}
- Founders: Vincent Karremans; Freek Schouten; Huge de Ruiter; Laurens van Nues
- Products: AI-powered career network
- Services: Talent Community Management, Employer Branding, Talent Pooling, AI Matching, GDPR-Compliant Communication
- Website: magnet.me
- Current status: Active

Magnet.me is a Dutch technology company that operates an AI-powered career network connecting employers and talent in one platform. Candidates manage their own profiles and stay connected with employers they follow, while companies build and maintain lasting talent communities for future hiring. As of 2025, the network includes more than 400,000 professionals and 5,500 employers.

== History ==
Magnet.me was founded in 2012 by Vincent Karremans, Laurens van Nues, Freek Schouten en Hugo de Ruiter while studying at Erasmus University Rotterdam. The company was created to address two recurring challenges in early-career recruitment: for employers, the difficulty of reaching relevant talent; and for students and graduates, the struggle to find roles that truly matched their ambitions.

Initially focused on connecting students and recent graduates with employers, Magnet.me introduced an AI-driven matching system that helped candidates discover suitable opportunities and allowed companies to attract more relevant applicants while strengthening their employer branding. The platform quickly grew in the Netherlands and expanded its reach to a wider professional audience, developing into a network of more than 400,000 users.

Over time, Magnet.me evolved from a job-matching site into a relationship-based recruitment network. With the introduction of tools for employer branding, community building and data-compliant communication, the company repositioned itself as an AI-powered career network. Its mission now centres on redefining recruitment—from one-time transactions to long-term, continuous connections between employers and talent.

== Concept & features ==
Magnet.me connects employers and job seekerstalent in a shared, AI-powered network designed to make recruitment continuous rather than transactional. Employers can invite candidates from any touchpoint—such as career sites, events, referrals or applicant tracking systems—to join their talent community. Within this environment, they can communicate directly, share updates and opportunities, and maintain long-term relationships without losing data to privacy regulations.

The platform uses artificial intelligence to match open roles with relevant profiles, keep data current, and automatically re-engage potential hires. The system integrates with existing applicant tracking and CRM tools and can be implemented without complex technical setup. Employers can also expand their reach through Magnet.me’s broader network of more than 400,000 professionals.

From the candidate perspective, Magnet.me offers a personal and ongoing experience. Instead of applying to one-off vacancies, users build relationships with companies. From a single profile, they can manage all their connections, stay visible to relevant employers, and be the first to know when the right opportunity opens up. AI recommendations highlight roles aligned with their skills and interests, while the integrated career coach provides insight into fit, growth potential and application preparation.
