= Felix Austria =

Felix Austria may refer to:

- Latin: 'Bella gerant alii, tu felix Austria nube, lit. ''Let others wage war; you, happy Austria, marry'', a saying about the house of Habsburg; see Pax Austriaca
- Felix Austria (company), a food company
- Felix Austria!, a 2013 documentary; see Mark Orton
- Felix Austria (novel), a 2014 novel by Ukrainian writer Sofia Andrukhovych

== See also ==
- Name of Austria
