= List of oldest institutions in continuous operation =

This article contains a list of the oldest existing social institutions in continuous operation, by year of foundation, in the world. Inclusion in this list is determined by the date at which the entity met the traditional definition of an institution – may it be public, political, religious or educational – although it may have existed as a different kind of institution before that time. This definition limits the term "institution" to organisations with distinctive structural and legal features. It must also be still in operation, with continuity retained throughout its history, and so some institutions which were abolished at some point are excluded, despite resurrections (although these may be dealt with further down in this article). Some institutions re-emerge but with new foundations, and these too are omitted from the regular list.

== State institutions ==
- List of sovereign states by date of formation
  - List of current monarchies

== Religious institutions ==
- Major religious groups
  - Religious denomination

== Educational institutions ==
=== Schools ===
- The King's School, Canterbury, England, United Kingdom (597)

=== Universities ===
- University of Bologna, Bologna, Italy (1088; charter granted 1158)

=== Islamic seminaries ===
- University of al-Qarawiyyin, Fes, Morocco, founded as Islamic seminary in 859

=== Military academies ===
- Military Academy of Modena, Modena, Italy (1678)

== Commercial institutions ==
- List of oldest companies
  - List of oldest banks in continuous operation
  - List of the oldest newspapers
- Kongō Gumi, a construction company founded in 578 in Japan

== See also ==
- Institution
- Organization
- Organizational life cycle
