= List of former monarchies =

This is a list of former monarchies, i.e. monarchies which once existed but have since been abolished. (Note: entries in bold refer to groups of kingdoms)

== Ancient ==
Early Bronze Age

- Indus Valley (3300 BC-1300 BC)
- Ancient Egypt (3150 BC–30 BC)
- Kingdom of Kish (c. 2900 BC–2296 BC)
- Van Lang (2879 BC–258 BC)
- Minoan (c. 2700 BC–c. 1600 BC)
- Kingdom of Uruk (c. 2600 BC–2048 BC)
- Land of Punt (c. 2500 BC–980 BC)
- Kingdom of Ur (c. 2500 BC–1940 BC)
- Kingdom of Lagash (c. 2500 BC–2046 BC)
- Kingdom of Kerma (2500 BC–1500 BC)

Middle Bronze Age

- Amorite Kingdom (c. 2000 BC–1595 BC)
- Kingdom of Assyria (c. 2000 BC–605 BC)
- Kingdom of Larsa (1961 BC–1674 BC)
- Babylonia (1830 BC–732 BC)
- Mycenaean (c. 1900 BC–c. 1100 BC)

East Asian Bronze Age

- Gojoseon Kingdom (2333 BC–108 BC)
- Xia Kingdom (2070 BC–1600 BC)
- Shang Kingdom (c. 1600–1046 BC)

Late Bronze Age

- Mitanni Kingdom (c. 1500 BC–c. 1300 BC)
- Kingdom of Arzawa (c. 1500 BC–c. 1200 BC)
- Phoenicia (1200 BC–539 BC)

Iron Age

- Sindhu-Sauvīra (1300 BC- 518 BC)
- Magadha Kingdom (until 320 BC)
- Colchis (–164 BC)
- Kingdom of Phrygia (until 696 BC)
- Kingdom of Lydia (until 546 BC)
- Philistia (until 732 BC)
- Sabaean Kingdom (c. 1100 BC–275 AD)
- Zhou Kingdom (c. 1046–256 BC)
- United Kingdom of Israel and Judah (1030 BC–931 BC)
- Kingdom of Ammon (c. 1000 BC–332 BC)
- Kingdom of Israel (930 BC–720 BC)
- Kingdom of Judah (930 BC–586 BC)
- Kingdom of Edom (c. 900 BC–c. 600 BC)
- Kingdom of Urartu (858 BC–585 BC)

== Classical Antiquity ==
Asia

- Orintid Armenian Kingdom (c. 600 BC–335 BC)
- Bosporan Kingdom (c. 600 BC–443 AD)
- Pandyan Kingdom (c. 600 BC–1345 AD)
- Scythia (c. 600 BC–c. 100 BC)
- Kingdom of Tambapanni (543 BC–437 BC)
- Odrysian Kingdom (460 BC–46 AD)
- Kingdom of Anuradhapura (437 BC–1017 AD)
- Armenia (331 BC–428 AD)
- Caucasian Iberia (302 BC–580 AD)
- Dian Kingdom (c. 300 BC–109 BC)
- Kingdom of Pontus (291 BC–62 AD)
- Attalid kingdom (282 BC–133 BC)
- Kingdom of Au Lac (258 BC–207 BC)
- Greco-Bactrian Kingdom (256 BC–125 BC)
- Kingdom of Nanyue (204 BC–111 BC)
- Kingdom of Sophene (c. 200 BC–94 BC)
- Twipra Kingdom (c. 200 BC–1858 AD)
- Indo-Scythian Kingdom (200 BC–395 AD)
- Indo-Greek Kingdom (180 BC–10 AD)
- Nabataean kingdom (168 BC–106 AD)
- Commagene (163 BC–72 AD)
- Hasmonean Kingdom (140 BC–37 BC)
- Kingdom of Lazica (131 BC–697 AD)
- Himyarite Kingdom (110 BC–525 AD)
- Buyeo Kingdom (c. 100 BC–494 AD)
- Kuninda Kingdom (c. 100 BC–c. 200 AD)
- Silla Kingdom (57 BC–935 AD)
- Goguryeo Kingdom (37 BC–668 AD)
- Baekje Kingdom (18 BC–660 AD)
- Indo-Parthian Kingdom (12 BC–130 AD)
- Kingdom of Khotan (56–1006)
- Kingdom of Funan (c. 1–628)
- Langkasuka Kingdom (c. 100–1516)
- Tuyuhun Kingdom (285–670)
- **Sixteen Kingdoms (304–439)**
- Byzantine Empire (330–1204)
- Taruma Kingdom (358–669)
- Kamarupa (4th century – 12th century)
- Melayu Kingdom (4th century – 13th century)
- Deira (6th century)

Europe

- Athens (until 338 BC)
- Sparta (c. 900 BC–146 BC)
- Macedonian Kingdom (808 BC–146 BC)
- Roman Kingdom (c. 750 BC–c. 510 BC)
- Ancient Corinth (747 BC–146 BC)
- Ancient Thebes (c. 500 BC–335 BC)
- Kingdom of Mide (76–1171)
- Kingdom of Dacia (82 BC–106 AD)
- Roman Empire (31 BC – 476 AD)

Africa

- Kingdom of Kush (1070 BC–350 AD)
- Nok culture (1000 BC–300 AD)
- Kingdom of D'mt (c. 700 BC–c. 400 BC)
- Ancient Carthage (650 BC–146 BC)
- Ptolemaic Kingdom (305 BC–30 BC)
- Kingdom of Numidia (202 BC–46 BC)
- Kingdom of Aksum (100 AD–940 AD)

== Middle Ages ==
Asia

- Early Lý dynasty (544–602)
- Brahmin Dynasty of Sindh (632–711)
- Soomra Dynasty (1011–1333)
- Samma Dynasty (1333–1520)
- Kedah Kingdom (630–1136)
- Kingdom of Polonnaruwa (1055–1232)
- Sultanate of Ternate (1257–1914)
- Kingdom of Sunda (669–1579)
- Kingdom of Champa (7th century – 1832)
- Mataram kingdom (752–1045)
- Kingdom of Abkhazia (778–1008)
- Pagan Kingdom (849–1287)
- Kingdom of the Kartvels (888–1008)
- **Mon Kingdoms (9th–11th, 13th–16th, 18th centuries)**
- Kingdom of Tondo (900s–1589)
- Hubaekje (900–936)
- Hugoguryeo (c. 901–918)
- Bali Kingdom (914–1908)
- Dongdan Kingdom (926–936)
- Kingdom of Georgia (978–1223)
- Kingdom of Lori (979–1118)
- Kingdom of Butuan (possibly 1000–1600)
- Kingdom of Kakheti-Hereti (1020s–1104)
- Kediri (1045–1221)
- Armenian Kingdom of Cilicia (1080–1375)
- Kingdom of Jerusalem (1099–1291)
- Chutiya Kingdom (1187–1673)
- Jaffna Kingdom (1215–1619)
- Trần dynasty (1225–1400)
- Kingdom of Dambadeniya (1220–1345)
- Singhasari Kingdom (1222–1292)
- Ahom kingdom (1228–1826)
- Kingdom of Lan Xang (1353–1707)
- Sukhothai Kingdom (1238–1438)
- Majapahit Kingdom (1293–1527)
- Ottoman Empire (1299–1923)
- Kingdom of Singapura (1299–1398)
- Kingdom of Gampola (1341–1408)
- Ayutthaya Kingdom (1351–1767)
- Joseon Kingdom (1392–1897)
- Kingdom of Mysore (1399–1947)
- Garhwal Kingdom (c. 1400–1814)
- Malacca Sultanate (1400–1511)
- Kingdom of Kotte (1412–1597)
- Ryūkyū Kingdom (1429–1879)
- Kingdom of Imereti (1455–1810)
- Kingdom of Kakheti (1465–1762)
- Kingdom of Kartli (1466–1762)
- Taungoo dynasty (1510–1752)
- Le dynasty (1428–1789)
- Kingdom of Lan Na (1292–1775)
- Sultanate of Maldives (1153–1953, 1954–1968)
- Möng Mao Lông (1335–1444)

Europe

- Frankish Kingdom (3rd century – 10th century)
- First Kingdom of Burgundy (4th century)
- Kingdom of Galicia (Suebic Kingdom of Galicia) (**410–584**, 910–1833)
- Visigothic Kingdom (418–721)
- Kingdom of Kent (450–871)
- Kingdom of Gwynedd (460–1282)
- Kingdom of Sussex (477–825)
- Ostrogothic Kingdom (493–553)
- Kingdom of Ceredigion (5th century – early 10th century)
- Kingdom of Powys (5th century – 1160)
- Kingdom of Wessex (519–927)
- Kingdom of Essex (527–812)
- (Midlands) Kingdom of Mercia (527–919)
- Kingdom of Bernicia (6th century)
- Kingdom of the East Angles (6th century – 917)
- Northumbria (654–878)
- Kingdom of Asturias (718–925)
- Kingdom of Navarre (824–1620)
- West Frankish Kingdom (843–987)
- Kingdom of Scotland (**843–1707**, 1660–1707)
- Bagratuni Kingdom of Armenia (845–1045)
- Kingdom of Castile (850–1230)
- Kingdom of Jórvík (876–954)
- Kingdom of Provence (879–933)
- Kingdom of Alba (900–1286)
- Kingdom of León (910–1230)
- Kingdom of Croatia (**c. 925–1102**, 1527–1868)
- Kingdom of England (927–1649, 1660–1707)
- Kingdom of Burgundy-Arles (933–late Middle Ages)
- Kingdom of Deheubarth (950–1197)
- Kingdom of Viguera (970–1005)
- Kingdom of Hungary in the Middle Ages (1000–1570)
- Kingdom of Mann and the Isles (1079–1266)
- Kingdom of Poland (**1025–1385**, 1385–1569, 1917–1918)
- Kingdom of Aragon (1035–1707)
- Kingdom of Duklja (1053–1100)
- Kingdom of Cyprus (1192–1489)
- Kingdom of Sicily (1130–1816)
- Kingdom of Portugal (1139–1910)
- Kingdom of Galicia–Volhynia (Rus) (1199–1349)
- Kingdom of Thessalonica (1204–1224)
- Kingdom of Bohemia (1212–1918)
- Kingdom of Serbia (1217–1346)
- Kingdom of Valencia (1237–1707)
- Kingdom of Lithuania (**1251–1263**, 1918)
- Kingdom of Majorca (1262–1349)
- Kingdom of Albania (1272–1368)
- Kingdom of Naples (1285–1816)
- Kingdom of Bosnia (1377–1463)
- Kingdom of Poland (1025–1385, **1385–1569**, 1917–1918)

Africa

- Kingdom of Makuria (350 AD–1276, 1286–1317)
- Kanem Empire (c. 700 AD–1376)
- Kingdom of Nekor (710 AD–1019)
- Ghana Empire (c. 750 AD–c. 1235)
- Kingdom of Nri (1043–1911)
- Kingdom of Sine (1100–1969)
- Almohad Caliphate (1121–1269)
- Ethiopian Empire (1137–1974)
- Ayyubid Sultanate (1171–1341)
- Hafsid Kingdom (1229–1574)
- Mali Empire (c. 1230–c. 1600)
- Mamluk Sultanate (1250–1517)
- Mankessim Kingdom (1252–1873)
- Ifat Sultanate (1285–1415)
- Warsangali Sultanate (1218–1886)
- Ajuran Sultanate (13th century – 17th century)
- Songhai Empire (c. 1340–1591)
- Jolof Empire (c. 1350–1549)
- Bornu Empire (c. 1380–1893)
- Kingdom of Kongo (c. 1390–1914)
- Kingdom of Kaffa (c. 1390–1897)
- Adal Sultanate (c. 1415–1559)
- Benin Empire (c. 1440–1897)
- Kingdom of Mutapa (c. 1450–1698)
- Kingdom of Fez (1472–1554)
- Kingdom of Loango (15th century – 19th century)

Americas

- Kingdom of Nicoya (800–1524)
- Kingdom of Chimor (Chimu) (900–1470)
- K'iche' Kingdom of Q'umarkaj (13th century – 1524)
- Kingdom of Tlaxcallan
- Inca Empire (1197–1533)

== Early Modern ==
Asia

- Kalhora Dynasty (1701–1783)
- Kingdom of Sitawaka (1521–1594)
- Johor Sultanate (1528–1855)
- Kingdom of Middag (17th century)
- Kingdom of Kandy (1581–1815)
- Kingdom of Tungning (1662–1683)
- Qing Dynasty (1644–1912)
- Kingdom of Nepal (1768–2008)
- Kingdom of Maynila (1500s–1571)
- Kingdom of Kartli-Kakheti (1762–1800)
- Thonburi Kingdom (1767–1782)
- Kingdom of Luang Phrabang (1707–1947)
- Kingdom of Vientiane (1707–1828)
- Kingdom of Champasak (1707–1904)

Europe

- Eastern Hungarian Kingdom (1526–1571)
- Kingdom of Croatia (c. 925–1102, **1527–1868**)
- Royal Hungary (1570–1867)
- Kingdom of England (927–1707, **1660–1707**)
- Kingdom of Ireland (**1541–1651**, 1659–1801)
- Kingdom of Livonia (1570–1578)
- Kingdom of Ireland (1541–1651, **1659–1801**)
- Kingdom of Scotland (843–1707, **1660–1707**)
- Kingdom of Prussia (1701–1918)
- Kingdom of Great Britain (1707–1801)
- Kingdom of Sardinia (1720–1861)
- Kingdom of Finland (**1742**, 1918–1919)

Africa

- Kasanze Kingdom (c. 1500–1648)
- Kingdom of Koya (1505–1896)
- Denanke Kingdom (1514–1776)
- Kingdom of Baguirmi (1522–1897)
- Kingdom of Matamba (1530–19th century)
- Cayor Kingdom (1549–1879)
- Kingdom of Luba (1585–1889)
- Dendi Kingdom (1591–1901)
- Igala Kingdom (16th century–1901)
- Kingdom of Dahomey (c. 1600–1900)
- Kasanje Kingdom (1620–1910)
- Kuba Kingdom (1625–1900)
- Ouaddai Kingdom (1635–1912)
- Kénédougou Kingdom (c. 1650–1898)
- Geledi Sultanate (c. late 17th century–1910)
- Ashanti Empire (c. 1701–1957)

Oceania

- Kingdom of Hawaii (1795–1893)

Americas

- New Kingdom of Granada (16th century–1739)

== Modern ==
Europe

- United Kingdom of Great Britain and Ireland (1801–1922)
- Napoleonic Kingdom of Italy (1805-1814)
- Kingdom of Italy (1861–1946)
- Kingdom of France (972–1792)
- First French Empire (1804–1814, 1815)
- Restored Kingdom of France (1814–1815, 1815-1830)
- July Monarchy of France (1830-1848)
- Second French Empire (1851–1870)
- Kingdom of Bavaria (1806–1918)
- Kingdom of Saxony (1806–1918)
- Kingdom of Württemberg (1806–1918)
- Kingdom of Westphalia (1807–1813)
- Kingdom of Hanover (1814–1866)
- United Kingdom of Portugal, Brazil and the Algarves (1815–1822)
- Kingdom of the Two Sicilies (1816–1861)
- Kingdom of Greece (**1832–1924, 1935–1974**)
- Kingdom of Sicily (1130–1816)
- Kingdom of Romania (1881–1947)
- Kingdom of Serbia (1882–1918)
- Kingdom of Bulgaria (1908–1946)
- Kingdom of Montenegro (1910–1918)
- Poland Kingdom of Poland (1025–1385, 1385–1569, **1917–1918**)
- Kingdom of Lithuania (1251–1263, **1918**)
- Kingdom of Finland (1742, **1918–1919**)
- Kingdom of Yugoslavia (1918–1943)
- Kingdom of Iceland (1918–1944)
- Kingdom of Albania (1928–1939)
- Modern Kingdom of Hungary (1920–1946)
- Russian Empire (1721–1917)
- German Empire (1871–1918)
- Austria-Hungary (1867–1918)
- Kingdom of Portugal (1139–1910)

Asia

- Talpur Dynasty (1783–1843)
- Sublime State of Iran (1789–1925)
- Imperial State of Iran (1925–1979)
- Kingdom of Hejaz (1916–1925)
- Arab Kingdom of Syria (1920)
- Kingdom of Kurdistan (1922–1924)
- Kingdom of Afghanistan (1926–1973)
- Kingdom of Hejaz and Nejd (1926–1932)
- Kingdom of Iraq (1932–1958)
- Kingdom of Yemen (1918–1962)
- Tibet (1912–1951)
- Empire of Japan (1868–1947)
- Korean Empire (1897–1910)
- Kingdom of Laos (1953–1975)
- Kingdom of Sikkim (1642–1975)
- Kingdom of Nepal (1768–2008)
- Konbaung dynasty (1752–1885)
- Nguyen dynasty (1802–1945)
- Tay Son dynasty (1778–1802)

Africa

- Zulu Kingdom (1816–1897)
- Yeke Kingdom (c. 1856–1891)
- Kingdom of Egypt (1922–1953)
- Kingdom of Libya (1951–1969)
- Kingdom of Tunisia (1956–1957)
- Kingdom of Burundi (1962–1966)
- Ethiopian Empire (1270–1974)
- Sultanate of Zanzibar (1856–1964)
- Central African Empire (1976–1979)

Americas

- First Empire of Haiti (1804–1806)
- Kingdom of Haiti (1811–1820)
- United Kingdom of Portugal, Brazil and the Algarves (1815–1822)
- First Mexican Empire (1821–1823)
- Empire of Brazil (1822–1889)
- Second Empire of Haiti (1849–1859)
- Second Mexican Empire (1863–1867)

== See also ==
- List of current monarchies
- List of monarchies
- Abolition of monarchy
- List of empires
- List of medieval great powers
- List of largest empires
