= Scaleup company =

Profitable and scalable business in its growth phase

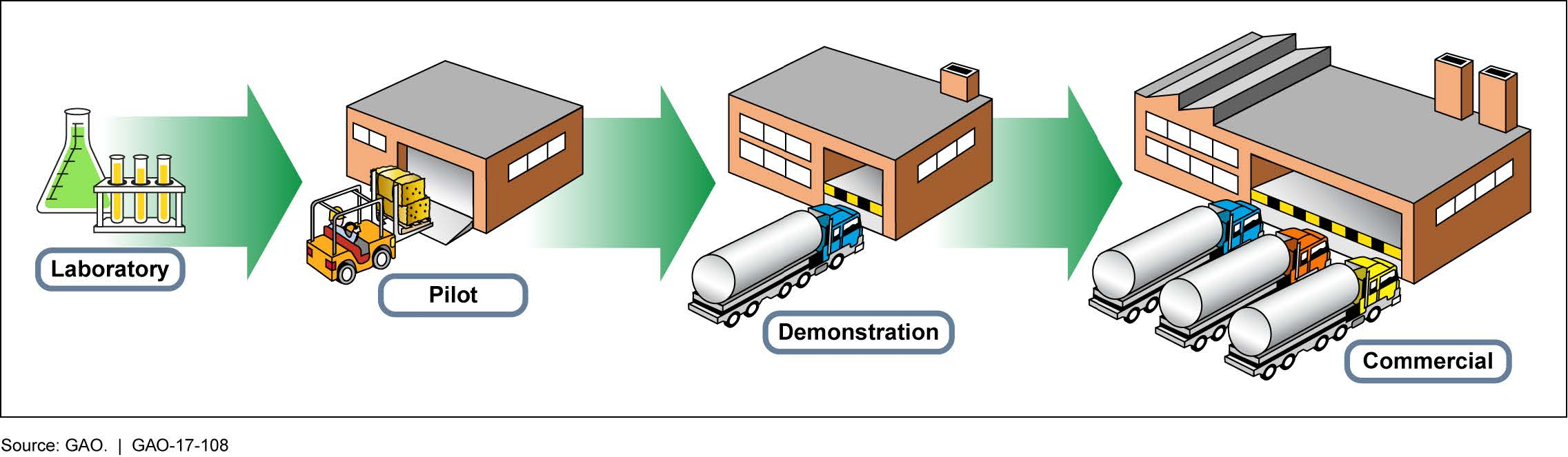
Sketch of how you can imagine a business that scales up

A scaleup company or just scaleup is a company that already has a profitable and scalable business model and grows above 20% in either turnover or number of employees over a three-year period. A scaleup can be identified as being in the "growth phase" life-cycle in the Millers and Friesen life cycle theorem, or the "Direction phase" in the Greiner growth curve.

== Concept ==
A key difference between a startup and a scaleup is the main challenges faced. While a startup's main challenge is to find a repeatable scalable business model, a scaleup's main challenge is growth of the already identified business model while maintaining operational controls.

It is reported that one out of ten venture capital-funded startups successfully transitions to this stage. A 2018 study showed that only 0.4 percent of all startups scale, reaching more than 10 million revenues within 5 years. The remainder stabilizes or grows at a much lower rate. A scaleup, once successful, obtains the unicorn status.

=== Evolution ===
One way of looking at the evolution of a startup into a scaleup is that scaleups evolve from startups as they cross the (so called) "growth chasm" that is, once they solve the startup challenges of market research, development, and identifying a repeatable, scalable business model. This can be identified by a significant sustained repetition of critical mass in a particular startup's most significant metric – generally, this metric is revenue, number of employees, number of active users, number of active customers, or effective reach, relative to funds raised. Once scaleup company employs at least 10 people, then it is considered within its growth phase life cycle.

== Importance of scaleups ==
The importance of scaleups and the rise of their terminology according to the World Economic Forum is that, although not all startups make it big, the ones that do greatly impact society by means of new technology, services and increased employment.

To aid this rise, instead of large startup incubators, policy makers are more and more focusing on scaleups since they are the ones that add value.

One commonly used definition of 'scaleup' is the OECD-Eurostat definition relating to 'gazelles' or High Growth Firms: "All enterprises with average annualised growth greater than 20% per annum, over a three year period should be considered as high-growth enterprises. Growth can be measured by the number of employees or by turnover."

Endeavor published a study reporting that scaleups create most of Southeast Asia's new jobs. Endeavor founder/CEO Linda Rottenberg published the scaleup petition to further elevate the movement around scaleups.
