= List of empires =

This is a navigational list of empires.

== Empires ==
Empire	Start year	End year	Duration (years)
Achaemenid Empire	550 BC	330 BC	220
Afsharid Iran	1736	1796	60
Akkadian Empire	2334 BC	2154 BC	180
Akwamu	c. 16th century	1730	229–130
United States of America (disputed)	1776	present	250
Angevin Empire	1154	1214	60
Aq Qoyunlu	1378	1508	130
Armenian Empire of Tigranes the Great	89 BC	55 BC	34
Asante Empire	1701	1902	201
Austria-Hungary	1867	1918	51
Austrian Empire	1804	1867	63
Avar Khaganate	567	822	255
Ayutthaya Kingdom	1351	1767	416
Aztec Empire	1428	1521	93
Old Babylonian Empire	1894 BC	1595 BC	299
Neo-Babylonian Empire	626 BC	539 BC	87
Bamana Empire	1712	1861	149
Belgian colonial empire	1908	1962	55
Kingdom of Benin	1180	1897	717
Empire of Brazil	1822	1889	67
British Empire	1583	1997/present	414/443
British Raj (Indian Empire)	1858	1947	89
Sultanate of Brunei (1368–1888)	1368	1888	520
Old Great Bulgaria	632	668	36
First Bulgarian Empire	681	1018	337
Second Bulgarian Empire	1185	1396	211
Byzantine Empire	330	1453	1123
Carolingian Empire	800	888	88
Carthaginian Empire	814 BC	146 BC	668
Central African Empire	1976	1979	3
Chenla	550	802	252
Chimor	900	1470	570
People's Republic of China (disputed)	1949	present	76
Chola Empire	848	1279	431
Athenian Empire	478 BC	404 BC	74
Danish colonial empire	1537	1953	416
Durrani Empire	1747	1843	96
Dutch colonial empire	1595	1962	367
Dzungar Khanate	1634	1758	124
Empire of Charles V	1519	1556	37
New Kingdom of Egypt	1570 BC	1069 BC	501
Elamite Empire	1210 BC	1100 BC	110
Ethiopian Empire	1270	1974	704
First French Empire	1804	1815	11
Second French Empire	1852	1870	18
French colonial empire	1534	1814	280
French colonial empire	1830	1980/present	150/196
Funan	50	550	500
Gallic Empire	260	274	14
Gaza Empire	1824	1897	73
German colonial empire	1884	1920	36
German Empire	1871	1918	47
German Empire (1848–1849)	1848	1849	1
Ghana Empire	830	1235	405
Ghaznavid Empire	977	1186	209
Goguryeo	37 BC	668	705
Goryeo	918	1392	474
Golden Horde	1225	1502	277
Grand Duchy of Lithuania	1236	1795	559
Empire of Great Fulo	1512	1776	264
Gupta Empire	240	579	339
Habsburg monarchy	1282	1918	636
First Empire of Haiti	1804	1806	2
Second Empire of Haiti	1849	1859	10
Han dynasty	202 BC	220 AD	422
Hephthalite Empire	440	560	120
Hittite Empire	1650 BC	1200 BC	450
Holy Roman Empire	800/962	1806	1006/844
Hoysala Kingdom	950	1346	396
Hunnic Empire	370	469	99
Iberian Union	1580	1640	60
Ife Empire	1000	1420	420
Ilkhanate	1256	1335	79
Inca Empire	1438	1572	134
Italian Empire	1882	1943	61
Empire of Japan	1868	1947	79
State of Japan	1947	present	79
Jin dynasty (266–420)	266	420	154
Jin dynasty (1115–1234)	1115	1234	119
Jolof Empire	1360	1549	189
Kaabu	1537	1867	330
Kanem–Bornu Empire	c. 700	1902	1202
Khmer Empire	802	1431	629
Khwarazmian Empire	1077	1231	154
Kingdom of Georgia	1008	1490	482
Kong Empire	1710	1898	188
Korean Empire	1897	1910	13
Kushan Empire	30	375	345
Kingdom of Kush	780 BC	350	1130
Latin Empire	1204	1261	57
Liao dynasty	916	1125	209
Macedonia	7th century BC	168 BC	532–433
Majapahit	1293	1527	234
Mali Empire	1235	1610	375
Maratha Confederacy	1674	1818	144
Massina Empire	1818	1867	49
Maurya Empire	321 BC	185 BC	136
Median Empire (disputed)	678 BC	550 BC	128
First Mexican Empire	1821	1823	2
Second Mexican Empire	1863	1867	4
Middle Assyrian Empire	1363 BC	912 BC	451
Ming dynasty	1368	1644	276
Mongol Empire	1206	1368	162
Great Moravia	833	907	74
Mughal Empire	1526	1857	331
Nanda Empire	345 BC	322 BC	23
Nazi Germany	1933	1945	12
Kingdom of Nepal	1768	2008	240
Neo-Assyrian Empire	911 BC	609 BC	302
Neo-Sumerian Empire	2112 BC	2004 BC	108
North Sea Empire	1013	1042	29
Empire of Nicaea	1204	1261	57
Odrysian kingdom	480 BC	30 BC	450
Omani Empire	1696	1856	158
Ostrogothic Kingdom	493	553	60
Ottoman Empire	1299	1922	623
Oyo Empire	1300	1836	536
Pagan kingdom	849	1297	448
Pala Empire	750	1161	411
Palmyrene Empire	270	273	3
Parthian Empire	247 BC	224	471
Kingdom of Pontus	281 BC	62	342
Portuguese Empire	1415	1999	584
Ptolemaic Kingdom	305 BC	30 BC	275
Purépecha Empire	1300	1530	230
Qara Khitai	1124	1218	94
Qing dynasty	1644	1912	268
Rattanakosin Kingdom (1782–1932)	1782	1932	150
Roman Empire	27 BC	395	422
Rozvi Empire	1683	1866	183
Russian Empire	1721	1917	196
Safavid Iran	1501	1736	235
Samo's Empire	631	658	27
Sasanian Empire	224	651	427
Samanid Empire	819	999	180
Seleucid Empire	312 BC	63 BC	249
Seljuk Empire	1037	1194	157
Serbian Empire	1346	1371	25
Shu Han	221	263	42
Shunga Empire	185 BC	73 BC	112
Sikh Empire	1799	1849	50
Singhasari	1222	1292	70
Song dynasty	960	1279	319
Songhai Empire	1464	1591	127
Soviet Union (disputed)	1922	1991	68
Spanish Empire	1492	1976	496
Sui dynasty	581	618	37
Sur Empire	1538	1555	17
Swedish Empire	1611	1721	110
Tang dynasty	618	907	289
Tây Sơn dynasty	1778	1802	24
Empire of Thessalonica	1224	1246	22
Tibetan Empire	618	842	224
Timurid Empire	1370	1507	137
Empire of Trebizond	1204	1461	257
Toltec Empire	674	1122	448
Tuʻi Tonga Empire	950	1865	915
Tukulor Empire	1849	1903	54
First Turkic Khaganate	552	603	51
Empire of Vietnam	1945 (March)	1945 (August)	0 (5 months)
Vijayanagara Empire	1336	1646	310
Wari Empire	600	1100	500
Wassoulou Empire	1878	1898	20
Western Chalukya Empire	975	1184	209
Western Roman Empire	395	476	81
Yuan dynasty	1271	1368	97
Zhou dynasty	1046 BC	256 BC	790

== See also ==
- Historic recurrence
- List of former sovereign states
- List of former monarchies
- List of medieval great powers
- Middle Eastern empires
- Political history of the world
