= List of current monarchies =

Absolute monarchies Semi-constitutional monarchies Parliamentary monarchies Commonwealth realms (parliamentary monarchies in personal union) Subnational monarchies

This is a list of current monarchies. As of 2026, there are 43 sovereign states in the world with a monarch as head of state. There are 13 in Asia, 12 in Europe, 9 in the Americas, 6 in Oceania, and 3 in Africa. (Note: In addition, Samoa is sometimes considered a de facto monarchy. The O le Ao o le Malo (head of state) of Samoa is similar to a constitutional monarch, but is now elected by the fono (legislature) for five years. Until the death of Malietoa Tanumafili II in 2007, the office was held for life. All office holders have been chosen from the matai (chiefs).)

== Types of monarchy ==
These are the approximate categories which present monarchies fall into:

- Commonwealth realms. King Charles III is the monarch of fifteen Commonwealth realms (Antigua and Barbuda, Australia, The Bahamas, Belize, Canada, Grenada, Jamaica, New Zealand, Papua New Guinea, Saint Kitts and Nevis, Saint Lucia, Saint Vincent and the Grenadines, Solomon Islands, Tuvalu, and the United Kingdom). They evolved out of the British Empire into fully independent states within the Commonwealth of Nations that retain the same King as head of state, unlike other Commonwealth countries that are either dependencies, republics or have a different royal house. All fifteen realms are constitutional monarchies and full democracies, where the King (or his representative) legally possesses vast prerogatives, but fulfills a largely ceremonial role.
- Other European constitutional monarchies. Andorra, Belgium, Denmark, Luxembourg, the Netherlands, Norway, Spain, and Sweden are fully democratic states in which the monarch has a limited, largely, or entirely ceremonial role.
  - Andorra is unique among all existing monarchies, as it is a diarchy, with the Co-Princeship being shared by the President of France and the Bishop of Urgell. This arrangement creates a unique situation among monarchies, as
    - neither Co-Prince is of Andorran descent,
    - one is elected by common citizens of a foreign country (France), but not by Andorrans as they cannot vote in the French Presidential Elections,
    - the other, the bishop of Urgell, is appointed by a foreign head of state, the Pope.
- European mixed monarchies. Liechtenstein and Monaco are constitutional monarchies in which the Prince retains many powers of an absolute monarch. For example, the 2003 Constitution referendum gives the Prince of Liechtenstein the power to veto any law that the Landtag (parliament) proposes and vice versa. The Prince can hire or dismiss any elective member or government employee from their post. However, unlike an absolute monarch, the people can call for a referendum to end the Prince's reign. The Prince of Monaco has similar powers: he cannot hire or dismiss any elective member or government employee from their post, but he can select the minister of state, government council and judges.
- Muslim monarchies. Absolute monarchs remain in Brunei, Oman and Saudi Arabia. The United Arab Emirates and Qatar are classified as mixed, meaning there are representative bodies of some kind, but the monarch retains most of his powers. Bahrain, Jordan, Kuwait, Malaysia and Morocco are constitutional monarchies, but their monarchs still retain more substantial powers than in European equivalents. In Malaysia, the King of Malaysia is restricted to acting on the advice of cabinet and the Prime Minister; making his role more akin to a traditional constitutional monarch.
- East and Southeast Asian constitutional monarchies. Bhutan, Cambodia, Japan, and Thailand have constitutional monarchies where the monarch has a limited or ceremonial role. Thailand changed from a traditional absolute monarchy into a constitutional one in 1932, while Bhutan changed in 2008. Cambodia had its own monarchy after independence from the French Colonial Empire, which was deposed after the Khmer Rouge came into power. The monarchy was subsequently restored in the peace agreement of 1993.
- Other sovereign monarchies. Four monarchies do not fit into one of the above groups by virtue of geography or class of monarchy: Tonga, Eswatini, Lesotho and Vatican City. Of these, Lesotho and Tonga are constitutional monarchies, while Eswatini and Vatican City are absolute monarchies.
  - Eswatini is increasingly being considered a diarchy. The King, or Ngwenyama, rules alongside his mother, the Ndlovukati, as dual heads of state originally designed to be checks on political power. The Ngwenyama, however, is considered the administrative head of state, while the Ndlovukati is considered the spiritual and national head of state, a position which has become largely symbolic in recent years.
  - The Pope is technically not a king, yet he functions as the absolute sovereign of Vatican City by virtue of his position as head of the Roman Catholic Church and Bishop of Rome; he is an elected rather than hereditary ruler. The Pope need not be a citizen of the territory prior to his election by the cardinals.
- Non-sovereign monarchies. A non-sovereign monarchy or subnational monarchy is one in which the head of the monarchical polity (whether a geographic territory or an ethnic group), and the polity itself, are subject to a sovereign state. The non-sovereign monarchies of Malaysia, Yogyakarta Sultanate in Indonesia, emirates of the United Arab Emirates, the Sultanate of Sulu, Afro-Bolivian monarchy, Order of Malta, Traditional Chieftaincies of Nigeria, and kingdoms of Uganda are examples of these.

== Lines of succession ==
Some of the extant sovereign monarchies have lines of succession that go back to the medieval period or antiquity:

- The Kings of Cambodia claim descent from Queen Soma (1st century), although the historiographical record is interrupted in the "Post-Angkor Period" (15th/16th centuries). A real unified Kingdom of Cambodia first came to existence in 802. The Monarchy in Cambodia was abolished between 1970 and 1993.
- There exist several suggestions on a possible line of succession in the Danish monarchy from the late 7th century and until Gorm the Old, but none of these suggestions have so far won universal acceptance. Most monarchs in Denmark since the 940s have been descendants of Gorm the Old's father Harthacnut and all monarchs in Denmark since 1047 have been descendants of titular Queen Estrid Svendsdatter. A formal law of succession was not adopted in Denmark until 1665.
- Japan, considered a constitutional monarchy under the Imperial House of Japan, is traditionally said to have originated with the mythical Emperor Jimmu. The first verifiable historiographical evidence begins with Emperor Kinmei in the 6th century. It is the oldest continuous hereditary monarchy in the world.
- The Monarchs of Norway by virtue of descent from Harald I Fairhair, who united the realm in 872. Harald as a member of the House of Yngling is given a partly legendary line of succession from earlier petty kings in historiographical tradition. Far from all Monarchs of Norway since the 930s have been descendants of Harald Fairhair: at least seven or eight Norwegian kings from the period c. 970 – 1859 were not descendants of Harald Fairhair.
- The Kingdom of Spain by descent from the Catholic Monarchs (via the House of Habsburg), ultimately combining the lines of succession of Castile and León and Aragon, realms established in the 10th to 11th centuries in the course of the Reconquista, via the Kingdom of Asturias claiming descent from the Visigothic Kingdom (which, originally ruled by the Thervingi Kings, had become elective in the 6th century). The Monarchy of Spain was abolished twice in the 19th and 20th centuries (1873–1874 and 1931–1939) and replaced by republics.
- The Monarchs of the United Kingdom and Commonwealth realms inherit the throne by virtue of descent from Sophia of Hanover, according to the Act of Settlement 1701. Sophia was the granddaughter of James VI and I who inherited and held in union the Kingdoms of England, Scotland and Ireland (Union of the Crowns) in 1603. Succession to the English throne originates with the House of Wessex, established in the 6th century; the Scottish throne with descent from Pictish kings who likewise enter the historical record around the 6th century.

== Current monarchies ==
| Monarchy | Official local name(s) | Title of Head of State | Monarch | Title of Head of Government | Type of monarchy | Succession | Current constitution |
|---|---|---|---|---|---|---|---|
| Andorra | In Catalan: Principat d'Andorra | Co-Princes | Josep-Lluís Serrano Pentinat Emmanuel Macron | Prime Minister | Parliamentary | Ex officio | 1993 |
| Antigua and Barbuda | In English: Antigua and Barbuda | King | Charles III | Prime Minister | Parliamentary | Hereditary | 1981 |
| Australia | In English: Commonwealth of Australia | King | Charles III | Prime Minister | Parliamentary | Hereditary | 1901 |
| The Bahamas | In English: Commonwealth of the Bahamas | King | Charles III | Prime Minister | Parliamentary | Hereditary | 1973 |
| Bahrain | In Arabic: Mamlakat al- Baḥrayn | King | Hamad bin Isa Al Khalifa | Prime Minister | Semi-constitutional | Hereditary | 2002 |
| Belgium | In Dutch: Koninkrijk België In French: Royaume de Belgique In German: Königreich Belgien | King (Note: Belgium is the only existing popular monarchy – a system in which the monarch's title is linked to the people rather than a state. The title of Belgian kings is not King of Belgium, but instead King of the Belgians. Another unique feature of the Belgian system is that the new monarch does not automatically assume the throne at the death or abdication of his predecessor; he only becomes monarch upon taking a constitutional oath.) | Philippe | Prime Minister | Parliamentary | Hereditary | 1831 |
| Belize | In English: Belize | King | Charles III | Prime Minister | Parliamentary | Hereditary | 1981 |
| Bhutan | In Dzongkha: Druk Gyal Khap | Dragon King | Jigme Khesar Namgyel Wangchuck | Prime Minister | Semi-constitutional (Note: Per Congress.gov, Bhutan is a constitutional monarchy with a parliamentary government.) | Hereditary | 2007 |
| Brunei | In Malay: Negara Brunei Darussalam | Sultan | Hassanal Bolkiah | Prime Minister | Absolute | Hereditary | 1959 |
| Cambodia | In Khmer: Preăh Réachéanachâk Kâmpŭchéa | King | Norodom Sihamoni | Prime Minister | Parliamentary | Hereditary and elective | 1993 |
| Canada | In English and French: Canada | King | Charles III | Prime Minister | Parliamentary | Hereditary | 1982 |
| Kingdom of Denmark | In Danish: Kongeriget Danmark In Faroese: Kongsríki Danmark In Greenlandic: Kunngeqarfik Danmarki | King | Frederik X | Prime Minister | Parliamentary | Hereditary | 1849 |
| Eswatini | In Swazi: Umbuso weSwatini In English: Kingdom of Eswatini | King Queen Mother | Mswati III Ntfombi | Prime Minister | Absolute | Hereditary and elective | 1968 |
| Grenada | In English: Grenada | King | Charles III | Prime Minister | Parliamentary | Hereditary | 1974 |
| Jamaica | In English: Jamaica | King | Charles III | Prime Minister | Parliamentary | Hereditary | 1962 |
| Japan | In Japanese: 日本国 (Nippon-koku/Nihon-koku) | Emperor | Naruhito | Prime Minister | Parliamentary | Hereditary | 1947 |
| Jordan | In Arabic: al-Mamlakah al-Urdunīyah al-Hāshimīyah | King | Abdullah II | Prime Minister | Semi-constitutional | Hereditary and elective | 1952 |
| Kuwait | In Arabic: Dawlat al-Kuwait | Emir | Mishal Al-Ahmad Al-Jaber Al-Sabah | Prime Minister | Semi-constitutional | Hereditary and elective | 1962 |
| Lesotho | In Sotho: Muso oa Lesotho In English: Kingdom of Lesotho | King | Letsie III | Prime Minister | Parliamentary | Hereditary and elective | 1993 |
| Liechtenstein | In German: Fürstentum Liechtenstein | Sovereign Prince | Hans-Adam II | Prime Minister | Semi-constitutional | Hereditary | 1862 |
| Luxembourg | In French: Grand-Duché de Luxembourg In German: Großherzogtum Luxemburg In Luxembourgish: Groussherzogtum Lëtzebuerg | Grand Duke | Guillaume V | Prime Minister | Parliamentary | Hereditary | 1868 |
| Malaysia | In Malay: Malaysia | Yang di-Pertuan Agong | Ibrahim Iskandar | Prime Minister | Parliamentary & Federal | Elective | 1957 |
| Monaco | In French: Principauté de Monaco In Monégasque: Principatu de Múnegu | Sovereign Prince | Albert II | Minister of State | Semi-constitutional | Hereditary | 1911 |
| Morocco | In Arabic: al-Mamlaka al-Maghribiyya In Berber: Tagldit n Lmɣrib | King | Mohammed VI | Prime Minister | Semi-constitutional | Hereditary | 2011 |
| Kingdom of the Netherlands | In Dutch: Koninkrijk der Nederlanden In West Frisian: Keninkryk fan de Nederlannen | King | Willem-Alexander | Prime Minister | Parliamentary | Hereditary | 1815 |
| New Zealand | In English: New Zealand In Māori: Aotearoa | King | Charles III | Prime Minister | Parliamentary | Hereditary | 1907 |
| Norway | In Bokmål: Kongeriket Norge In Nynorsk: Kongeriket Noreg In Northern Sami: Norgga gonagasriika | King | Haakon VIII | Prime Minister | Parliamentary | Hereditary | 1814 |
| Oman | In Arabic: Salṭanat ‘Umān | Sultan | Haitham bin Tariq | Sultan | Absolute | Hereditary | 1996 |
| Papua New Guinea | In English: Independent State of Papua New Guinea In Tok Pisin: Independen Stet bilong Papua Niugini In Hiri Motu: Papua Niu Gini | King | Charles III | Prime Minister | Parliamentary | Hereditary | 1975 |
| Qatar | In Arabic: Dawlat Qaṭar | Emir | Tamim bin Hamad Al Thani | Prime Minister | Semi-constitutional | Hereditary | 2004 |
| Saint Kitts and Nevis | In English: Federation of Saint Christopher and Nevis | King | Charles III | Prime Minister | Parliamentary | Hereditary | 1983 |
| Saint Lucia | In English: Saint Lucia | King | Charles III | Prime Minister | Parliamentary | Hereditary | 1979 |
| Saint Vincent and the Grenadines | In English: Saint Vincent and the Grenadines | King | Charles III | Prime Minister | Parliamentary | Hereditary | 1979 |
| Saudi Arabia | In Arabic: Al-Mamlakah al-Arabiyah as-Sa'ūdiyah | King | Salman | Prime Minister | Absolute | Hereditary and elective | 1992 (Note: Basic Law of Saudi Arabia) |
| Solomon Islands | In English: Solomon Islands | King | Charles III | Prime Minister | Parliamentary | Hereditary | 1978 |
| Spain | In Spanish: Reino de España | King | Felipe VI | President of the Government | Parliamentary | Hereditary | 1978 |
| Sweden | In Swedish: Konungariket Sverige | King | Carl XVI Gustaf | Prime Minister | Parliamentary | Hereditary | 1974 |
| Thailand | In Thai: Ratcha Anachak Thai | King | Rama X | Prime Minister | Parliamentary | Hereditary | 2017 |
| Tonga | In Tonga: Puleʻanga Fakatuʻi ʻo Tonga In English: Kingdom of Tonga | King | Tupou VI | Prime Minister | Semi-constitutional | Hereditary | 1970 |
| Tuvalu | In English: Tuvalu | King | Charles III | Prime Minister | Parliamentary | Hereditary | 1986 |
| United Arab Emirates | In Arabic: Dawlat al-ʾImārāt al-ʿArabiyyah al-Muttaḥidah | President | Mohamed bin Zayed Al Nahyan | Prime Minister | Semi-constitutional & Federal | Hereditary and elective | 1971 |
| United Kingdom | In English: United Kingdom of Great Britain and Northern Ireland In Welsh: Teyrnas Unedig Prydain Fawr a Gogledd Iwerddon In Irish: Ríocht Aontaithe na Breataine Móire agus Thuaisceart Éireann In Scots Gaelic: Rìoghachd Aonaichte Bhreatainn agus Èirinn a Tuath | King | Charles III | Prime Minister | Parliamentary | Hereditary | No codified constitution |
| Vatican City | In Latin: Status Civitatis Vaticanae In Italian: Stato della Città del Vaticano | Pope | Leo XIV | President of the Pontifical Commission | Absolute | Elective | 2023 |

In Wallis and Futuna, an overseas territory of France in the South Pacific, there are three chiefdoms, Uvea, Alo and Sigave, whose monarchs are chosen by local noble families. Similarly, Malaysia, which is itself monarchy, also consists of 13 states, 9 of which are monarchies in their own right. Additionally, one of those states, Negeri Sembilan, consists of a number of monarchial chiefdoms.

== See also ==
- Abolition of monarchy
- List of oldest institutions in continuous operation
- List of former monarchies
