= List of monarchies =

There are and have been throughout recorded history a great many monarchies in the world. Tribal kingship and Chiefdoms have been the most widespread form of social organisation from the Neolithic, and the predominance of monarchies has declined only with the rise of Republicanism in the modern era.

A monarchical form of government can be combined with many different kinds of political and economic systems, from absolute monarchy to constitutional monarchy and from a market economy to a planned economy. Some examples for certain forms of monarchy are:

Extant monarchies are listed in bold type.

== Antiquity ==
- Trigarta kingdom (c. BC – c. 1946)
- Egypt (c. 3500 BC – 30 BC)
- Monarchy of China (c. 2070 BC – 1912 AD; ended by revolution)
  - Chinese Empire (221 BC – 1912 AD)
- Minoan Crete (c. 2600 BC – 1200 BC)
- Akkadian Empire (c. 23rd century BC – c. 21st century BC)
- Babylon (1959 BC – c. 6th century BC; absorbed by Persian Empire)
- Mycenaean Greece (c. 1600 BC – c. 1100 BC)
- United Monarchy of Israel (c. 1050 BC- c. 930 BC); succeeded by the following two kingdoms:
  - Kingdom of Israel (c. 930 BC- 722 BC; conquered by Assyria)
  - Kingdom of Judah (c. 930 BC– 586 BC; conquered by Babylon)
- Athens (c. 1000 BC – 683 BC)
- Sparta (c. 1300 BC – 192 BC)
- Macedon (808 BC – 148 BC)
- Roman Kingdom (753 BC – 509 BC)
- Magadha (c. 600 BC – 26 BC)
- Persian Empire (c. 648 BC – 334 BC; became subnational monarchy of Kingdom of Macedon)
- Sinhalese monarchy (c. 543 BC – 1815 AD)
- Gojoseon (? – 108 BC)
- Kingdom of Armenia (321 BC – 428 AD)
- Persian Empire (323 BC – 1037 AD; became subnational monarchy of Sultanate of Seljuk)
- Laigin, founded c. 300 BC – 1632.
- Greco-Bactrian Kingdom (250 BC – 125 BC; became Kushan Empire)
- Indo-Greek Kingdom (180 BC – 10 AD)
- Hasmoneans (140 BC – 37 BC; succeeded by Herodian Dynasty)
- Herodian Dynasty (37 BC – 92 AD)
- Ulaid, c. 1st century BC – 1201
- Kushan Empire (105 BC – 270 AD; became Kidarite Kingdom)
- Silla (57 BC – 935 AD)
- Goguryeo (37 BC – 668 AD)
- Roman Empire (31 BC – 476 AD)
- Baekje (c. 18 BC – 660 AD)
- Funan (c. 1st century AD – c. 7th century; absorbed into Khmer Empire)
- Gangga Negara (c. 1st century – 1026)
- Indo-Parthian Kingdom (c. 1st century – c. 106)
- Västergötland (c. 1st century – c. 6th to 12th century; absorbed by Sweden)
- Aidhne (pre-1st century – 1543)
- Sri Ksetra (c. 1st century – 656)
- Kingdom of Axum (1st century – 960 AD)
- Cóiced Ol nEchmacht – pre 2nd century AD to c. 600.
- Kingship of Tara (? – 1022 AD)
- Chera Kingdom (c. 3rd century BC – 1102 AD; became Kingdom of Venad)
- Chola Kingdom (c. 3rd century BC – 1279 AD; absorbed into Pandyan Kingdom)
- Srivijaya (c. 3rd century AD – c. 1400; became Sultanate of Malacca)
- Sassanid Empire (226 – 651; a period of Persian Empire)
- Gupta Empire (240–550)
- **Wa (Japan)** (3rd to 5th century – 12th century)
- Byzantine Empire (324–1453; absorbed into Ottoman Empire)
- Uí Maine, Ireland, c. 357 – c. 1611.
- Kingdom of Osraige, c. 4th century – c. 1556.
- Kingdom of Uí Failghe, at least 4th century – 16th century.
- Kedah Kingdom (630–1136; became Kedah Sultanate)
- Kidarite Kingdom (c. 4th century – c. 5th century)
- Kingdom of Powys (c. 4th century – 1284; absorbed into England)
- Pictland (c. 4th century – 843; merged with Dál Riata to form Scotland)
- Kingdom of Gwynedd (c. 5th century – 1209; absorbed into Wales)
- Connacht (4th/5th century – 1478)
- Máenmag (pre 581 – 8th/9th century)
- Suebi (410–584)
- Tethbae (pre 5th – 11th century)
- Merovingians (410–751)
- Rheged (~420-638; annexed by Northumbria)
- Ailech (5th-century – 1185)
- Visigothic Kingdom (475–718)
- Ostrogothic Kingdom (489–553; absorbed into Byzantine Empire)
- Kingdom of Terengganu (c. 6th century – c. 15th century; became subnational monarchy of Malacca)
- Dál Riata (pre 6th century – 839; merged with Pictland to form Scotland)
- Pattani Kingdom (c. 500 – c. 11th century; became subnational monarchy of Srivijaya)
- Frankish Empire (509 – 843; became Holy Roman Empire)
- Kingdom of Mide (c. 530's – 1173)
- Chenla (550 – c. 715)
- Mercia (585 – 918; absorbed into England)
- Uí Fiachrach Muaidhe (c. 600 – c.1603)
- Frisian kingdom (around 600 – 734; destroyed by the Franks.)
- Brega (pre-604 – 1171)
- Cnogba (Knowth) (pre 634 – 10th century)
- Conaille Muirtheimne (pre 668 – after 1081)
- Kingdom of Breifne (6th century – 1605)
- Northumbria (654–954)
- Champa (c. 7th century – 1832)
- Sunda Kingdom (669–1579 centuries)
- Srivijaya (671–1025 centuries)
- First Bulgarian Empire (681 – 1018; absorbed into Byzantine Empire)
- Airgíalla (pre-697 AD – 1590)
- Deis Mumhain (pre 697 – c. 1244)
- Balhae Empire (698–926)

== Middle Ages and Renaissance ==
- Kingdom of the Canary Islands (1404-1450)
- Loch Gabhair (8th–11th centuries)
- Al-Andalus (711–1492; absorbed by Kingdom of Spain)
- **Kingdom of Denmark** (pre 714–1848; became constitutional monarchy)
- Kingdom of Asturias (718–924; absorbed by Kingdom of León)
- Mataram kingdom (732 –1016 AD)
- Maigh Seóla (pre-752 AD. – 1051)
- Umaill (pre-773 AD – c. 1603)
- **Sultanate of Morocco** (789–1957; became semi-constitutional monarchy)
- Khmer Empire (802–1431; became Khmer Kingdom)
- High Kings of Ireland (c. 800 – 1198)
- Kingdom of Ireland (1542–1800, United with the Kingdom of Great Britain to become the United Kingdom of Great Britain and Ireland)
- Kingdom of Navarre (824–1512; absorbed into Kingdom of Spain)
- Murcia (825–1243; became subnational monarchy of the Kingdom of Castile)
- Holy Roman Empire (843–1806; dissolved after defeat by Napoleon)
- Kingdom of France (843–1791; became constitutional monarchy)
- Unification of Japan (16th century)
- Kingdom of Scotland (843–1707; united with Kingdom of England to become Kingdom of Great Britain)
- Bagan Kingdom (849–1364)
- Kingdom of Dublin (853–1171)
- **Kingdom of Norway** (872–1814; became constitutional monarchy with the Swedish Sovereign as King)
- Kievan Rus' (882–1240)
- Kingdom of León (913 – c. 13th century; absorbed into Crown of Castile)
- Bali Kingdom (914–1908; )
- Goryeo Dynasty (918–1392; became Joseon Dynasty)
- Kingdom of Aragon (925–1162; became Crown of Aragon)
- Kingdom of Croatia (medieval) (925–1102)
- Kingdom of England (927–1707; united with Kingdom of Scotland to become Kingdom of Great Britain)
- Magh Luirg (c. 956 – c. 1585)
- **Kingdom of Sweden** (970–1866; became constitutional monarchy)
- Ma-i (Before AD 971-1339)
- Sultanate of Egypt (972–1517; became subnational monarchy of the Ottoman Empire)
- Kingdom of Castile (1037–1230; became Crown of Castile)
- Sultanate of Seljuk (A dynasty established in Iran 1037–1307)
- Kingdom of Nri (1043—1911)
- Síol Anmchadha (pre 1066 – after 1567)
- County of Edessa (1098–1144)
- Principality of Antioch (1098–1268)
- Kingdom of Jerusalem (1099–1187, 1192–1291)
- County of Tripoli (1102–1289)
- Kingdom of Venad (1102 – c. 1750)
- Thomond (1118–1543)
- Kingdom of Desmond (1118–1596)
- Kingdom of Portugal (1139–1910; ended by revolution)
- Crown of Aragon (1162–1479; became Kingdom of Spain)
- Vladimir-Suzdal (1125–1389; became Grand Principality of Moscow)
- Second Bulgarian Empire (1185–1396; absorbed into Ottoman Empire)
- **Shōgun** (c. 12th century – 19th century; rule on behalf of the imperial court)
- **Unification of Japan** (c. 16th century)
- Sultanate of Maldives (1153–1953, 1954–1968)
- Kingdom of Cyprus (1192–1489)
- Kingdom of Bohemia (1198–1806; with the dissolution of the Holy Roman Empire absorbed into Austrian Empire)
- Kingdom of Galicia–Volhynia (1199–1349; absorbed into Kingdom of Poland and Grand Duchy of Lithuania)
- Kingdom of Poland (1025–1031; 1076–1079; 1295–1296; 1300–1305; 1320–1795)
- Latin Empire (1204-1261; absorbed into Byzantine Empire)
- Despotate of Epirus (1204–1337, 1356–1479; absorbed into Byzantine empire and then Ottoman Empire respectively)
- Kingdom of Thessalonica (1204-1224; absorbed into Despotate of Epirus)
- Empire of Nicaea (1204–1261; reestablished the Byzantine Empire)
- Empire of Trebizond (1204–1461)
- Principality of Achaea (1205–1432)
- Duchy of Athens (1205–1458)
- Mongol Empire (1206–1368)
- Principality of Wales (1208–1283; absorbed by England)
- Serb Kingdom (1217–1395; regal title not succeeded)
- Singhasari (1222–1292)
- Empire of Thessalonica (1224–1246)
- Crown of Castile (1230–1479; became Kingdom of Spain)
- Aztec Empire (known to exist before 1233 Conquered by Spain 1521; Puppet monarchy through 1565)
- Sukhothai Kingdom (1238–1438; absorbed into Ayutthaya Kingdom)
- Lanna (1259–1939)
- **Principality of Andorra** (1278–1993; became constitutional monarchy)
- Majapahit (1292–1527)
- Ottoman Empire (1299–1922)
- Ajuran Empire (13th-17th)
- Sultanate of Gowa (14th century–1957)
- County of Cilli (1341–1456; absorbed by the Habsburgs)
- Serbian Empire (1345–1371; empire dissolved)
- Ayutthaya Kingdom (1350–1767; became Kingdom of Siam)
- Kingdom of Vidin (1356–1396; absorbed into the Ottoman Empire)
- Grand Principality of Moscow (1389–1547; became Tsardom of Russia)
- **Sultanate of Brunei** (c. 1363 century – 1959; became absolute monarchy with a constitution)
- 1st Kingdom of Ava (1364–1527)
- Kingdom of Bosnia (1377–1463)
- Joseon Dynasty (1392–1897; became Korean Empire 1897–1910, then Japanese occupation)
- Ashanti (c. 1400 – 1900; became subnational monarchy of Gold Coast)
- Sultanate of Malacca (1400–1511; ended with Portuguese occupation)
- **Kelantan** (1411–1499; became subnational monarchy of Malacca)
- **Sultanate of Sulu** (1412–1915; ceded temporal powers to the United States; became subnational monarchy of the Philippine Islands)
- Ryūkyū Kingdom (1429–1879; annexed to Japan)
- Khmer Kingdom (1431–1954; became Kingdom of Cambodia)
- **Kingdom of Spain** (1479–1812; became constitutional monarchy)
- Aceh Sultanate (1496–1903)
- Persia (1500–1935; became Kingdom of Iran)
- **Sultanate of Maguindanao** (1505 – 19th century; occupied by Spain)
- Bunyoro (c. 1520 – 1899; became subnational monarchy of the United Kingdom)
- Pegu Kingdom (1527–1531)
- **Sultanate of Johor** (1528–1946; became subnational monarchy of Malayan Union)
- **Sultanate of Perak** (1528–1874; became subnational monarchy of the United Kingdom)
- Maguindanao Sultanate (1205 – 19th century; annexed by Spain)
- Taungoo Kingdom (1531 – c. 1610)
- Tsardom of Russia (1576–1721; became Russian Empire)
- **Mataram Sultanate** (1584–1755; became Yogyakarta Sultanate and Surakarta Sunanate)
- 2nd Kingdom of Ava (1613–1752)

== Enlightenment and later ==
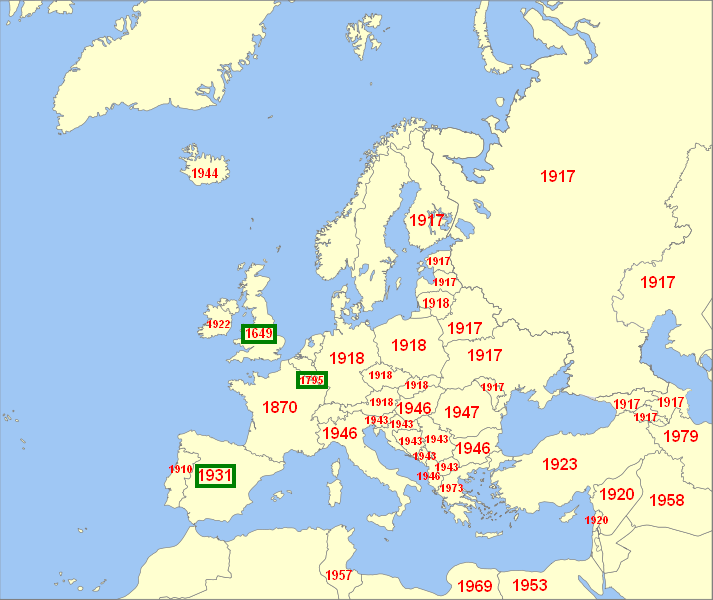
Dates of the latest abolitions of monarchies in Europe and the territories nearby. A green rectangle indicates that the monarchy was restored afterwards and is currently functioning. If a country has no date, it means that either it has never had a monarchical government (e.g. Switzerland) or it has been functioning throughout the country's modern history (e.g. Sweden, Denmark and Norway). Note that the dates do not necessarily mark the end of the national independent monarchy but the territory it covered (e.g. Ukraine).

=== Constitutional monarchies ===
A constitutional monarchy is a form of monarchical government established under a constitutional system which acknowledges an elected or hereditary monarch as head of state.

==== Unitary constitutional monarchies ====
Unitary constitutional monarchies are unitary states which are governed constitutionally as one single unit, with a single constitutionally created legislature.

- Kingdom of England (1660–1707; merged with Kingdom of Scotland to form the Kingdom of Great Britain)
- Kingdom of Prussia (1701–1918)
- Kingdom of Great Britain (1707–1800, became United Kingdom of Great Britain and Ireland)
- Kingdom of France (1791–1792), monarchy overthrown during the French Revolution; (1814–1815), monarchy deposed at the beginning of the Hundred Days; (1815–1830), monarchy overthrown during the July Revolution; (1830–1848), monarchy overthrown during the French Revolution of 1848
- United Kingdom of Great Britain and Ireland (1800–1921; became United Kingdom of Great Britain and Northern Ireland)
- Kingdom of Bohemia (1806–1918; dissolved after World War I)
- Kingdom of Hungary (1867–1918; part of Austro-Hungarian Empire)
- **Kingdom of Spain** (1812–1873; First Spanish Republic, 1873–1874; Restoration, 1874–1931; Second Spanish Republic, 1931–1939; Spanish Civil War, 1936–1939; dictatorship and regency under Franco, 1939–1975; Spanish transition to democracy 1975–1978, constitutional monarchy restored 1978–present)
- **Kingdom of Norway** (1814–present, Swedish Sovereign as King 1814–1905, independent in 1905)
- **Kingdom of the Netherlands** (1815–present)
- French Empire (1815 during the Hundred Days)
- First Mexican Empire (1821–1823); ended by forced abdication
- Kingdom of Portugal (1822–1910; ended by coup)
- Empire of Brazil (1822–1889; ended by coup)
- **Kingdom of Belgium** (1830–1980; became federal constitutional monarchy)
- Kingdom of Hawaii (1840–1894; ended by coup)
- Kingdom of Greece (1843–1924; republican interregnum; 1935–1974; ended by referendum)
- **Kingdom of Denmark** (1848–present)
- French Empire (1852–1870; became republic)
- Imperial State of Iran (1935–1979; ended by revolution)
- Kingdom of Italy (1861–1946; ended by referendum)
- **Principality of Liechtenstein** (1862–present)
- **Kingdom of Sweden** (1866–present)
- **Grand Duchy of Luxembourg** (1867–present)
- **Japan** (660 BC–present)
- Principality of Romania (1859–1881; transformed into a Kingdom)
- Second Mexican Empire (1864–1867); ended by execution
- Kingdom of Romania (1881–1947; ended by forced abdication)
- Principality of Serbia (1817–1882; transformed into a Kingdom)
- Kingdom of Serbia (1882–1918; merged into the Kingdom of Serbs, Croats and Slovenes)
- Principality of Frickgau (1802–1803; 364 Days under French, merged with Switzerland)
- Newfoundland (1907–1949)
- **New Zealand** (1907–present)
- Kingdom of Bulgaria (1908–1946; ended by referendum)
- Union of South Africa (1910–1961; ended by referendum)
- Princedom of Montenegro (1852–1910); transformed into a Kingdom
- Kingdom of Montenegro (1910–1918; merged into the Kingdom of Serbs, Croats and Slovenes)
- Kingdom of Serbs, Croats and Slovenes (1918–1929, transformed into Yugoslavia)
- Kingdom of Finland (1918; ended by parliamentary vote after The Apparent abdicated willingly before entering on the throne)
- **United Kingdom of Great Britain and Northern Ireland** (1921–present)
- **Kingdom of Jordan** (1921–present)
- Irish Free State (1922–1937)
- Kingdom of Egypt (1922–1953; ended by military coup)
- Kingdom of Yugoslavia (1929–1941; transformed into a Communist state in 1945)
- Kingdom of Iraq (1932–1958; Ended by coup)
- **Kingdom of Thailand** (1932–present)
- Ceylon (1948–1972)
- Kingdom of Laos (1949–1975, became socialist republic after the Laotian Civil War)
- Kingdom of Libya (1951–1969; become socialist republic)
- **Kingdom of Cambodia** (1953–1970; Khmer Republic, 1970–1975; Democratic Kampuchea, 1975–1979; People's Republic of Kampuchea, 1979–1989; State of Cambodia, 1989–1993; constitutional monarchy restored 1993–present)
- Kingdom of Tunisia (1956–1957; became republic)
- Ghana (1957–1960)
- Nigeria (1960–1963)
- Tanganyika (1961–1962)
- Sierra Leone (1961–1971)
- Trinidad and Tobago (1962–1976)
- Uganda (1962–1963)
- **Kingdom of Morocco** (1957–present)
- **Jamaica** (1962–present)
- Kenya (1963–1964)
- Malawi (1964–1966)
- Malta (1964–1974)
- The Gambia (1965–1970)
- Rhodesia (1965–1970)
- Guyana (1966–1970)
- Barbados (1966–2021)
- **Kingdom of Lesotho** (1966–present)
- Mauritius (1968–1992)
- Fiji (1970–1987)
- **The Bahamas** (1973–present)
- **Kingdom of Bahrain** (1971–1975; constitution abrogated; 2002–present)
- **Grenada** (1974–present)
- **Papua New Guinea** (1975–present)
- **Solomon Islands** (1978–present)
- **Tuvalu** (1978–present)
- **Saint Lucia** (1979–present)
- **Saint Vincent and the Grenadines** (1979–present)
- **Antigua and Barbuda** (1981–present)
- **Belize** (1981–present)
- **Saint Kitts and Nevis** (1983–present)
- Kingdom of Nepal (1990–2008; transformed into a republic)
- **Principality of Andorra** (1993–present)
- **Kingdom of Bhutan** (2008–present; unitary absolute monarchy from 1907 and transformed to constitutional monarchy in 2008)

==== Federal constitutional monarchies ====
Federal constitutional monarchies are federal states in which a number of federated entities are unified under a federal government and a single monarch, who acts as ceremonial head of state.

- United Kingdom of the Netherlands (1815–1830)
- **Canada** (1867–present)
- German Empire (1871–1918; dissolved after World War I and became the Weimar Republic)
- **Commonwealth of Australia** (1901–present)
- Pakistan (1947–1956)
- India (1947–1950)
- Federation of Malaya (1957–1963; became Malaysia)
- **Malaysia** (1963–present)
- **United Arab Emirates** (1971–present)
- **Kingdom of Belgium** (1980–present)
- **Saint Christopher ('Kitts') and Nevis** (1983–present)

==== Elective constitutional monarchies ====
- **Negeri Sembilan** (since 1873; within the British Empire (until 1957), the Federation of Malaya (1957–1963), and Malaysia (1963–present)
- Federation of Malaya (1957–1963, became Malaysia)
- **Malaysia** (1963–present)
- **Independent State of Samoa** (1962–present)
- **United Arab Emirates** (1971–present)

=== Absolute monarchies ===
An absolute monarchy is a monarchical form of government where the ruler has the power to rule his or her land or country and its citizens freely, with no laws or legally-organized direct opposition in force.

==== Unitary absolute monarchies ====
Unitary absolute monarchies are unitary states which are governed as one single unit by a single hereditary or elected leader. Some had or have a single legislature, which may or may not be constitutionally created.

- **Oman** (751–present)
- **Busoga** (c. prior to 18th century – 1961; became subnational monarchy of Uganda)
- **Wogodogo Monarchy** (c. 1690 – 1896; became subnational monarchy of France)
- **Emirate of Abu Dhabi** (c. 18th century – 1971; became subnational monarchy of the United Arab Emirates)
- **Buganda** (c. 18th century – 1961; became subnational monarchy of Uganda)
- **Emirate of Dubai** (c. 18th century – 1971; became subnational monarchy of the United Arab Emirates)
- **Negeri Sembilan** (c. 18th century – 1873; became subnational monarchy of the United Kingdom, currently a subnational elective monarchy within Malaysia)
- **Emirate of Ras al-Khaimah** (c. 18th century – 1972; became subnational monarchy of the United Arab Emirates)
- Russian Empire (1721–1917; ended by revolution)
- **Sultanate of Terengganu** (1724 – c. 19th century; became subnational monarchy of Siam)
- **Emirate of Sharjah** (c. 1727 – 1971; became subnational monarchy of the United Arab Emirates)
- 3rd Burmese Empire (c. 1760 – 1885)
- **Kingdom of Siam** (1768–1932; became constitutional monarchy, Kingdom of Thailand)
- Grand Duchy of Finland (1772–1809; became subnational monarchy of the Russian Empire)
- **Emirate of Umm al-Quwain** (1775–1971; became subnational monarchy of the United Arab Emirates)
- Kingdom of Nepal (1775–1990; became constitutional monarchy)
- **Kingdom of Bahrain** (1783–1971; became constitutional monarchy; 1975–2002; became constitutional monarchy)
- **Ankole** (c. 1800 – 1901; became subnational monarchy of Uganda)
- French Empire (1804–1814; became constitutional monarchy; brief restoration in 1815)
- Austrian Empire (1804–1867; became Austro-Hungarian Empire)
- Kingdom of Holland (1806–1810; client state of France; annexed by France)
- Kingdom of Hungary (1806–1867; became Austro-Hungarian Empire)
- **Principality of Liechtenstein** (1806–1862; became constitutional monarchy)
- Kingdom of Hawaii (1810–1840; became constitutional monarchy)
- Kingdom of Poland (1815–1865; within Russian Empire; absorbed by Russian Empire)
- Kingdom of Brazil (1816–1822; became constitutional monarchy)
- **Kingdom of Lesotho** (1818–1868; became subnational monarchy of the United Kingdom)
- **Emirate of Ajmān** (1820–1971; became subnational monarchy of the United Arab Emirates)
- **Qatar** (1825–present)
- Kingdom of Greece (1832–1843; became constitutional monarchy)
- Austro-Hungarian Empire (1867–1918; dissolved after World War I)
- **Kingdom of Bhutan** (1907–2008; absolute power voluntarily rescinded by king in 1969; became constitutional monarchy in 2008)
- **Kingdom of Saudi Arabia** (1932–present)
- **Kingdom of Cambodia** (1954–1970; Ended by military coup; kingdom restored as constitutional monarchy in 1993)
- **Sultanate of Brunei** (1959–present; constitution creates Sultan as absolute ruler)
- **Kingdom of Swaziland** (1968–present)
- Kingdom of Afghanistan (1926–1973; became the Republic of Afghanistan after a non-violent coup)
- Central African Empire (1976–1979; restated as a Republic after a non-violent coup with French aid)
- **Holy See (Vatican City)** (c. 756 AD, Pepin, father of Charlemagne granted the Pope control of area which became the Papal States – present; elective absolute monarchy)

== Subnational monarchies ==
A subnational monarchy is a territory governed by a hereditary leader, but which is subordinate to a higher national government, either monarchical or republican in form.

- **Sultanate of Kelantan** (c. 2nd century – present; within Funan, Khmer Empire, Srivijaya, Siam, British Empire, Federation of Malaya, and Malaysia)
- **Sultanate of Kedah** (c. 7th century – present; within Malacca, Siam, British Empire, Federation of Malaya, and Malaysia)
- **Sultanate of Pahang** (c. 8th century – present; within Srivijaya, Siam, Sultanate of Malacca, Aceh, Johor, the British Empire, the Federated Malay States, the Federation of Malaya, and Malaysia)
- **Principality of Perlis** (c. 8th century – present; within Kedah, Siam, the British Empire, the Malayan Union, and Malaysia)
- Kingdom of Bohemia (c. 9th century – 1806; within Holy Roman Empire; became constitutional monarchy)
- Kingdom of Germany (c. 11th century – 1806; within Holy Roman Empire; became Austrian Empire)
- **Luxembourg** (963 – 1867; within the Holy Roman Empire, Bohemia, the Netherlands, Austria, France and Belgium; became constitutional monarchy)
- Kingdom of Pattani (c. 11th century – 1909; within Srivijaya, Kingdom of Ayutthaya, Siam, dissolved between Thailand and Malaysia)
- Murcia (1243–1304; within the Kingdom of Castile, Kingdom of Aragon; absorbed into Castile)
- Principality of Sheikhan (c. 13th century – present; in present-day Iraq)
- Vaduz (1342 – 1806; within the Holy Roman Empire; became absolute monarchy of Liechtenstein)
- **Sultanate of Selangor** (1740–present; within the Netherlands, the British Empire, Federated Malay States, the Federation of Malaya, and Malaysia)
- **Sultanate of Yogyakarta** (1755–present; within Netherlands Indies, Japanese Empire, United States of Indonesia (1945–1951), and Republic of Indonesia
- **Sultanate of Terengganu** (c. 15th century – present; within Malacca, Siam, the British Empire, Federation of Malaya, and Malaysia)
- **Sultanate of Maguindanao** (1515-present; within Philippines)
- **Sultanate of Sulu** (1405–present; within Philippines)
- Grand Duchy of Finland (1809–1918; within Russian Empire; ended when The Grand Princely Throne became vacant at the Russian Revolution; became constitutional monarchy, Kingdom of Finland)
- **Barotseland** (1845–present); within Zambia
- **Māori Kingship** (1865–present; within Dominion of New Zealand)
- **Kingdom of Lesotho** (1868–1966); within the British Empire; became an independent constitutional monarchy)
- **Machame** (late 17th century-present; within Machame, Tanzania)
- **Afro-Bolivian Kingdom** (1823–present); within Bolivia
- Kingdom of Bavaria (1871–1918); held a privileged status (Reservatrechte) within the German Empire
- Kingdom of Saxony (1871–1918); held a privileged status (Reservatrechte) within the German Empire
- Kingdom of Württemberg (1871–1918); held a privileged status (Reservatrechte) within the German Empire
- **Negeri Sembilan** (1873–present; within the British Empire, the Federation of Malaya, and Malaysia)
- **Sultanates of Lanao** (c. 16th century – present; within Philippines)
- **Sultanate of Perak** (1511-present; within the British Empire, Federated Malay States, Federation of Malaya, and Malaysia)
- Principality of Bulgaria (1879–1908; within the Ottoman Empire; became constitutional monarchy)
- **Wogodogo Monarchy** (1896–present; within France and Burkina Faso)
- **Bunyoro** (1899–1966; within the British Empire, and Uganda; abolished; 1993–present; within Uganda)
- **Ashanti** (1900–present; within Ghana)
- **Ankole** (1901–1966; abolished; 1993–present; within Uganda)
- Kingdom of Egypt (1917–1922; within the British Empire, became constitutional monarchy)
- **Sultanate of Johor** (1946–present; within the Malayan Union, the Federation of Malaya, Malaysia)
- **Buganda** (1961–1966; abolished; 1993–present; within Uganda)
- **Busoga** (1961–1966; abolished; 1993–present; within Uganda)
- **Emirate of Abu Dhabi** (1971–present; within the United Arab Emirates)
- **Emirate of Ajmān** (1971–present; within the United Arab Emirates)
- **Emirate of Dubai** (1971–present; within the United Arab Emirates)
- **Emirate of Fujairah** (1971–present; within the United Arab Emirates)
- **Emirate of Sharjah** (1971–present; became subnational monarchy of the United Arab Emirates)
- **Emirate of Umm al-Quwain** (1981–present; within the United Arab Emirates)
- **Emirate of Ras al-Khaimah** (1973–present; within the United Arab Emirates)
- **Naso monarchy** within Panama

== Shared monarchies ==
A monarch may reign over multiple kingdoms, dominions or realms in various forms of political, dynastic, personal union or association.

- Between 925 and 1035 the Kingdom of Aragon shared a monarchy with the Kingdom of Navarre.
- From 1150 to 1319, the Kingdom of Aragon and the County of Barcelona (actually the Principality of Catalonia) formed a dynastical union named Crown of Aragon; from 1319 to 1479, the Crown was a federation of these two countries and the Kingdom of Valencia.
- The Kingdoms of León and Castile were united three times under the same monarch, first between 1037 and 1078, again from 1072 to 1157, and finally between 1230 and sometime in the 16th century.
- Between 1072 and 1095 León, Castile, and Galicia were united under a common monarch, whereafter Portugal separated under a different dynasty, and the others were absorbed by Spain.
- The Kalmar Union was a period between 1397 and 1536 in which Denmark, Norway and Sweden shared the same monarch as three independent countries. Norway and Denmark continued to share a monarchy from 1536 to 1814. Norway was then united under a common monarchy with Sweden from 1814 to 1905.
- From 1490 to c. 1740 Hungary and Bohemia (part of the Holy Roman Empire) shared a monarchy. These kingdoms shared a monarch from the Habsburgs who were Archdukes of Austria and Holy Roman Emperors. Briefly Naples and Sardinia in 1707, and Sicily in 1714 to their departure in 1735, 1720 and 1734, respectively. The Habsburgs declared themselves Emperors of Austria in 1804. The three countries remained in this situation until the union was ended in the aftermath of World War I, in 1918. The Austro-Hungarian Empire was the union of the Austrian Empire and the Kingdom of Hungary between 1867 and 1918 under a new constitution, the Austro-Hungarian Compromise of 1867, or Ausgleich.
- From 1541, King Henry VIII of England was declared King of Ireland, after being excommunicated by the pope and losing the title of Lord of Ireland. England and Ireland were joined in a personal union until 1603, when the James VI of Scotland became king of England and Ireland. All three crowns remained in personal union until 1707 when England and Scotland were united by the Acts of Union 1707 to become the Kingdom of Great Britain. The two crowns remained under personal union until the Acts of Union 1800 when the kingdoms became the United Kingdom of Great Britain and Ireland. This union lasted until Irish Independence in 1921 when with the departure of the 26 southern counties of Ireland, the UK officially became the United Kingdom of Great Britain and Northern Ireland.
- From 1580 to 1640, Portugal was under a united monarchy with Spain, in the period known as the Iberian Union.
- Between 1867 and 1890 Luxembourg and the Netherlands shared the same monarch.
- Charles III currently reigns as king over 15 sovereign Commonwealth realms, as well as the 14 British Overseas Territories and the three Crown Dependencies; in the crown dependency of the Isle of Man, Charles III is formally known as the Lord of Mann, and in the Channel Islands is formally known as the "King in right" and informally referred to as the Duke of Normandy.
- The King of France was also the co-prince of Andorra. After the abolition of the French monarchy the co-prince is now the president of the French Republic.

== See also ==
- List of former monarchies
- List of current monarchies
- List of current monarchs of sovereign states
- Non-sovereign Monarchy
