= Organizational life cycle =

Complete life cycle of an institution

The organizational life cycle is the life cycle of an organization from its creation to its termination. It also refers to the expected sequence of advancements experienced by an organization, as opposed to a randomized occurrence of events. The relevance of a biological life cycle relating to the growth of an organization, was discovered by organizational researchers many years ago. This was apparent as organizations had a distinct conception, periods of expansion and eventually, termination.

Sometimes the term business life cycle is used interchangeably with the organizational life cycle, while the two are different. The organizational life cycle is a more inclusive term for all kinds of organizations which includes even government organizations, but the business life cycle refers more specifically only to for-profit companies. Other than this, within the scope of business, the organizational life cycle and business life cycle can be distinguished by their primary focus. The organizational life cycle is primarily concerned with the internal development and evolution of the organization itself, while the business life cycle is primarily concerned with the external development and evolution of the business within its market environment. In other words, the organizational life cycle is an inward-looking process, while the business life cycle is an outward-looking process.

== Development ==
Comparisons between organisations and living organisms originated as early as 1890 by the economist Alfred Marshall who compared firms with trees in the forest, using the metaphor: "But here we may read a lesson from the young trees of the forest as they struggle upwards through the benumbing shade of their older rivals". Sixty years later, Kenneth Boulding presented the idea that organisations pass through a lifecycle similar to that of living organisms. Shortly after, Mason Haire was among the initial researchers who suggested that organisations may adhere to a certain path of uniformity in their course of expansion.

Subsequently, research has been done on the organizational life cycle for more than 120 years and can be found in various literature on organizations. Examples include the various stages in an organization's life cycle, phases of growth experienced by an organization during expansion and implications for these phases of growth. Review of the main organizational life cycle theories, with stages, main idea and authors is given in the table below.

Review of the life cycle stages in organizational literature
Life cycle stages	Main idea	Reference
Growth, competition, top position, stagnation, decline and (eventually) death	Growing trees in the forest as the analogy for the firm.	(Marshall, 1890)
Birth, growth, decline, death	Organisations follow the same lifecycle as living organisms.	(Boulding, 1950)
Born stage, growth - establishing of legitimacy, rapid growth -innovation and expansion, aging phase formalisation and control	Describes the dynamics of bureaucratic organisations.	(Downs, 1967)
Birth, youth-developing, stability and reputation, and maturity.	Organisation goes through stages in the lifecycle, and thus the crises which occur in every organisation could be predicted according to the stage.	(Lippitt and Schmitdt, 1967)
Informal "one-man- show", formalized bureaucracy, and diversified conglomerate	Organisational lifecycle is based on strategy and structure.	(Scott, 1971)
High-growth phase and low–growth (mature) phase	Researched how dividends fit in the lifecycle followed by the empirical evidence on dividend policy as it relates to the lifecycle theory. Value-maximizing firm should maintain a zero pay-out ratio at the initial stages and increase thepay-outs to 100% upon reaching maturity.	(Mueller,1972)
Creativity, direction, delegation, coordination, collaboration and alliances stage	The speed at which an organisation experiences phases of evolution and revolution is closely related to the market environment of its industry. Each phase is both an effect of the previous phase and a cause for the next phase.	(Greiner, 1972, 1998)
First stage of new agency, second stage of new agency	Based on organisational functional problems and how they can be applied to the analysis of complex public organisations. Problems provide criteria for identifying the functional effects of the efforts of an organisation both internally and as they contribute to the goals of larger systems.	(Lyden, 1975)
Primitive system stage, stable organisation stage and elaborative supportive structure stage	Organisational structures develops over timeframe of organisational growth.	(Katz and Kahn, 1978)
Courtship, infancy, go-go, adolescence, prime, stability, aristocracy, recrimination (early bureaucracy), bureaucracy and death.	Comparison of lifecycle of a company to lifecycle of living organism, with the crucial exception -company does not have to die, it can be rejuvenated. Organisations go through the normal struggles and difficulties accompanying each stage.	(Adizes,1979)
Initiation, innovation and institutionalization.	Features of the organisation that led to its success as an innovation in the short run were incompatible with requirements for survival in the longer run. These findings underscore the advantages of a biographical approach to organisational analysis.	(Kimberly,1979)
Entrepreneurial stage, collectively, formalization and elaboration of structure stage.	Changes that occur in organisations follow a predictable pattern that can be characterized by developmental stages. The stages are sequential, and changes target:cognitive orientations of organisation members, organisational structures and environment relation.	(Quinn and Cameron 1983)
Existence, survival, success, take-off and resource maturity	Small business growth depends on success factors as: business size, diversity, complexity, owner's management style and organisational goals.	(Lewis and Churchill 1983)
Birth, growth, maturity, revival and decline	Each stage would manifest integral complementariness among variables of environment, strategy, structure and decision making methods; Organisation growth and increasing environmental complexity would cause each stage to exhibit certain significant differences from all other stages along these four classes of variables	(Miller and Friesen 1984)
Inception, survival, growth, expansion and maturity.	Transition from one stage to the next requires change, it will be accompanied by some crisis or another. Proactivity of management can minimize those crisis.	(Scott and Bruce, 1986)
Growth, decline, death	Focus on causes and consequences of growth and decline processes in organisations has focused on the role of environmental, structure al, and individual factors.	(Whetten, 1987)
Entrepreneurial Stage, Collectivity Stage, Control Stage, Elaboration of Structure-Decline Stage	Focus is on two outcomes of formalization: administrative efficiency, and influence. Formalization (as efficiency) contribute to effectiveness early in an organisation's history. Later in the lifecycle, formalization (as influence) may contribute to organisational ineffectiveness and decline.	(Walsh and Dewar, 1987)
Conception, Investment, Incorporation, Investments, Incorporation, Experiments, Systematic production, Social network, Collaborative inquiry, Foundational community of inquiry, Liberating disciplines	Analogous to E. Erikson's (1959) theory of individual development. The main idea is to provide a new perspective on the problems of creating new organisations, changing bureaucratic organisations, and envisioning qualitatively different kinds of organising. Final phase enables rebirth by awareness of and skills for resolving gaps between mission, strategy and outcomes.	(Rooke & Torbert 1998; Sherman & Torbert 2000; Cacioppe and Edwards, 2005)
Existence, survival, success, renewal, decline	Resembling general Miller and Friesen viewpoint and 5 stages model, and developed a scale to classify organisations, and examines relationships between organisational lifecycle, competitive strategy, and performance.	(Lester, Parnell and Carraher, 2003)
The absorptive capacities: ignorance, awareness, knowledge, implementation. The tipping points: Market entry, operational improvement, people management, obtaining finance, formal systems, strategy.	As analogy to lifecycle stages they chose 6 tipping points with two dimensions (absorptive capacity and tipping point solutions) provide a framework within which to examine the growth needs of firms. Their reconceptualization of firm growth contrasts with the linear model described by the organismic metaphor and proposes that, over time, firms encounter tipping points which are the consequence of growth or of environmental changes. To navigate beyond the tipping point, the firm must have the capability to identify, acquire and apply new and requisite knowledge to resolve the new challenges and succeed in a competitive environment.	(Phelps, Adams, and Bessant, 2007)
Start-up, growth, maturity, and decline	Follow the framework of the resource-based theory to explain relations between managers and firm's resources. They use and explain synthesis of existing lifecycle research	(Sirmon, Hitt, Ireland&Gilbert, 2011)
Introduction, Growth, Maturity, Saturation, Recession	Synthesize earlier theoretical research in order to connect lifecycle with organisational structure management and transaction costs	(Gurianova, Gurianov and Mechtcheriakova, 2014)
Start-up phase, phases of expansion, maturity and subsequent diversification (or decline)	Lifecycle is unique configuration of variables related to organisation context, strategy, and structure. The number and nature of the stages varies extensively.	(Hanks, 2015)
Inception, High growth, Maturity	Author synthesize work of previous author to suggest usable model generic to all organisations	(Tam and Gray, 2016)

== Stages ==
Generally, there are five stages to an organization's life cycle

- Stage 1: Existence : Commonly known as the birth or entrepreneurial stage, "existence" signifies the start of an organization's expansion. The main importance is centered around the acknowledgement of having an adequate number of customers to keep the organization or business active.
- Stage 2: Survival : At this stage, organizations look to pursue growth, establish a framework and develop their capabilities. There is a focus on regularly setting targets for the organization, with the main aim being to generate sufficient revenue for survival and expansion. Some organizations enjoy adequate growth to be able to enter the next stage, whilst others are unsuccessful in achieving this and consequently fail to survive.
- Stage 3: Maturity : This stage signifies the organization entering a more formal hierarchy of management (hierarchical organization). A frequent problem encountered at this stage would be those associated with "Red Tape". Organizations look to safeguard their growth as opposed to focusing on expansion. Top and middle-level management specialize in different tasks, such as planning and routine work respectively.
- Stage 4: Renewal : Organizations experience a renewal in their structure of management, from a hierarchical to a matrix style, which encourages creativity and flexibility.
- Stage 5: Decline : This stage initiates the death of an organization. The decline is identified by the focus on political agenda and authority within an organization, whereby individuals start to become preoccupied with personal objectives, instead of focusing on the objectives of the organization itself. This slowly destroys the functionality and feasibility of the entire organization.

== Phases of growth ==
According to Larry Greiner, there are 5 phases of growth in an organization, each indicated by an evolutionary and subsequently, a revolutionary phase.

An evolutionary phase, refers to an extended duration of expansion enjoyed by the organization with no significant disruptions. In contrast, a revolutionary phase refers to a period of considerable disturbance within an organization.

=== Phase 1: creative expansion → leadership crisis ===
Creative expansion (evolutionary phase) leads to a leadership crisis (revolutionary phase). Initially, the organization enjoys expansion through the creativity and proactive nature of its founders. However, this leads to a crisis of leadership, as a more structured form of management is required. The founding members must either assume this role, or empower a competent manager to fulfill this if they are unable to.

=== Phase 2: directional expansion → autonomy crisis ===
Directional expansion (evolutionary phase) leads to a crisis of autonomy (revolutionary phase). As the organization experiences expansion through directive leadership, a more structured and functional management system is adopted. However, this leads to a crisis of autonomy. Greater delegation of authority to managers of lower levels is required, although at the reluctance of top-tier managers who do not wish to have their authority diluted.

=== Phase 3: expansion through delegation → control crisis ===
Expansion through delegation (evolutionary phase) leads to a crisis of control (revolutionary phase). As the organization expands from delegating more responsibilities to lower-level managers, top-tier directors start to lessen their involvement in the routine operations, reducing the communication between both levels. This eventually leads to a crisis of control, as lower-level managers become accustomed to working without the intrusion of top-level directors. This leads to a conflict of interest with the directors, who feel that they are losing control of the expanded organization.

=== Phase 4: expansion through coordination → red tape crisis ===
Expansion through coordination (evolutionary phase) leads to a crisis of red tape (revolutionary phase). As an organization expands from improving its coordination, such as through product group formation and authorized planning systems, a bureaucratic system develops. This eventually leads to a crisis of red tape, where many administrative obstacles reduce efficiency and innovation.

=== Phase 5: expansion through collaboration ===
At this stage, the organization seeks to overcome the barrier of red tape through adopting a more flexible and versatile matrix structure (matrix management). Educational courses are arranged for managers, to equip them with the skills of solving team disputes and to foster greater teamwork. Complex and formal systems are also made simpler, and there is an increased emphasis on the communication between managers, to solve crucial problems. Although Greiner identified expansion through collaboration as the evolutionary phase, he did not specifically identify the succeeding crisis (revolutionary phase), as there was little evidence due to most of the organizations still being in the collaboration phase. However, Greiner predicted that the crisis might involve the exhaustion of members in an organization, due to a strong requirement for innovation and teamwork.

== Implications for growth phases ==
There are certain implications for managers in organizations with regards to the phases of growth:

=== Recognizing one's position in the course of expansion ===
Top-tier managers should be aware of their organization's current stage, to be able to execute relevant solutions to the type of crisis faced. Managers should also not be tempted to surpass their current phase due to eagerness. This is because there may be vital experiences from each phase to be learned, that will be required to tackle future phases.

=== Recognizing the restricted variety of solutions ===
It becomes clear in each phase of revolution that there are only a specific number of solutions that can be applied. Managers should avoid repeating solutions, as this will prevent the evolution of a new phase of growth. It is also important to note that evolution is not a mechanical event, and organizations must actively seek out new solutions to the current crisis that are also suitable for the next stage of growth.

=== Recognizing that solutions result in crisis ===
Managers should realize that past actions are factors of future consequences. This would help managers in formulating solutions to cope with the crisis that develops in the future.

== Alternative model ==
While Greiner's model is conceptually attractive, the central problem is that it is not possible to operationalise or apply it to specific organizations in practical situations. This is because the five phases are conceptual and can not be measured. An alternative model has been proposed by Flamholtz. This models identifies seven different stages of organizational growth and uses corporate revenues as the way to define when each stage occurs (begins and ends).

The Seven stages of growth of a company's life cycle can be identified (all revenues in US dollars):

I.	New venture	up to $1 million
II.	Expansion	$1 million to $10 million
III.	Professionalization	$10 million to $100 million
IV.	Consolidation	$100 million to $500 million
V.	Diversification	$500 million to $1 billion
VI.	Integration	over $1 billion
VII.	Decline and revitalization	varies

These ranges are based upon manufacturing firms. An adjustment is made for the revenues of service and distribution firms. Revenues of service firms are multiplied by a factor of 3 to be the equivalent of manufacturing firms, and Revenues of distribution firms are multiplied by a factor of 2 to be the equivalent of manufacturing firms. These adjustments are made to account for the difference in cost of goods sold by manufacturing firms vis a vis service and distribution firms. A further explanation can be found in Flamholtz and Randle (2016).

== Limitations ==
According to the organizational life cycle models, growth in size leads to business issues that firms can solve by adopting only one possible organizational configuration, following a deterministic organizational approach. Recently, scholars challenged this view and propose conceiving of organizational life cycle as an evolutionary process, which calls for a variety of equifinal organizational solutions.

== See also ==
- Enterprise life cycle
- Small Business
- SME
- Tuckman's stages of group development, a subdividing of the early phases of organizational life cycle
- List of oldest institutions in continuous operation
