= Pax Austriaca =

Historiographical term

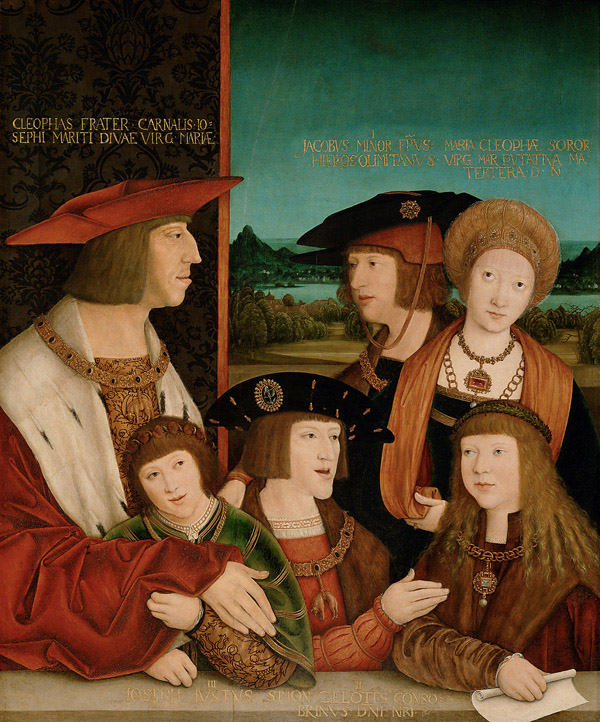
Family portrait of Emperor Maximilian I and his family; with his son Philip the Handsome, his wife Mary of Burgundy, his grandsons Ferdinand I and Charles V, and Louis II of Hungary (husband of his granddaughter Mary of Austria).

The term Pax Austriaca (Latin for 'Austrian Peace', modelled after Pax Romana), sometimes referred to as Pax Habsburgica, has been used by historians to describe the long-standing imperial vision and geopolitical strategy of the House of Habsburg, also known as the House of Austria. It encapsulates the Habsburg ambition to establish a stable, Catholic, and dynastically unified order across Europe under their leadership.

== History ==
The origins of this ideology are often traced to Archduke Frederick III, who became Holy Roman Emperor in 1452, the first Habsburg to hold that title. Frederick is associated with the enigmatic motto A.E.I.O.U. (Austriae est imperare orbi universo – "All the world is subject to Austria"), which symbolized an early articulation of universalist aspirations. Although his reign was marked more by consolidation than expansion, it laid the ideological foundation for Habsburg ascendancy.

Frederick's successor, Maximilian I, significantly advanced Habsburg influence through a strategy that became legendary: dynastic marriage. His famous dictum, "Bella gerunt alii, tu felix Austria nube" ("Let others wage war; you, happy Austria, marry"), reflected a deliberate policy of territorial expansion through inheritance alliances rather than military conquest. Through strategic unions, most notably with the Low Countries and later Spain, the Habsburgs came to control vast and diverse territories, forming one of the most extensive dynastic networks in European history.

Under Charles V, Habsburg ambitions reached their zenith. Ruling an empire that spanned Central Europe, Spain, the Low Countries, and vast overseas territories, Charles V made a concerted effort to impose a form of hegemonic peace in Europe grounded in dynastic unity and Catholic orthodoxy. However, these ambitions faced mounting resistance due to religious fragmentation, the rise of rival states, and internal administrative challenges. The outbreak of the Thirty Years' War ultimately shattered hopes for a unified Habsburg-led Europe, as prolonged religious and political conflict exposed the limits of imperial authority. This reality was formally confirmed by the Peace of Westphalia, which marked a decisive turning point in European history by ending the Habsburgs’ ambition to establish a single, universal Catholic empire. Instead, the treaties recognized the political independence of the various states within the Holy Roman Empire, granting them the right to govern their own affairs, including the choice of religion (cuius regio, eius religio), and thereby laying the foundations for a decentralized system of sovereign states.

Despite this, Austria remained the dominant force in Central Europe. The Austrian Empire and later Austria-Hungary continued to play a pivotal role as a major power, exerting significant political, military, and cultural influence across the region. As a multiethnic empire strategically positioned at the crossroads of Western, Central, and Eastern Europe, Austria acted as both a stabilizing force and a key arbiter in continental affairs. It was instrumental in shaping the post-Napoleonic order through its leadership at the Congress of Vienna, where statesman Klemens von Metternich championed a conservative balance of power aimed at preserving stability and preventing revolutionary upheaval. Throughout the 19th century, Austria’s influence extended over the German Confederation, Northeast Italy, and the Balkans, reinforcing its status as a central pillar of European diplomacy. Even as nationalist movements and external pressures gradually weakened its cohesion, Austria’s role as a major Central European power endured until the dissolution of Austria-Hungary at the end of World War I.
