= List of current non-sovereign monarchs =

This is a list of currently reigning constituent monarchs, including traditional rulers and governing constitutional monarchs. Each monarch reigns over a legally recognised dominion, but in most cases possess little or no sovereign governing power. Their titles, however, are recognised by the state. Entries are listed beside their respective dominion ("polity"), and are grouped by country.

== European monarchs ==
State	Polity	Monarch	Since	House	Succession	Refs
Guernsey	Sark	Christopher Beaumont	3 July 2016	Beaumont	Hereditary	
Ireland	Tory Island	vacant	19 October 2018	Kings of Tory	Elective	

== North American monarchs ==
State	Polity	Monarch	Since	House	Succession	Refs
Panama	Naso Tjër Di Comarca	Reynaldo Santana	02 Oct 2011	Santana	Elective and hereditary	
Trinidad and Tobago	Santa Rosa	Nona Aquan	12 Oct 2019	Aquan	Elective and hereditary	
Trinidad and Tobago	Moruga	Eric Lewis	21 Feb 2022	Lewis	Elective and hereditary	

== South American monarchs ==
State	Polity	Monarch	Since	House	Succession	Refs
Bolivia	Afro-Bolivians	Julio Pinedo	18 April 1992	Pinedo	Hereditary	

== Oceanian monarchs ==
State	Polity	Monarch	Since	House	Succession	Refs
American Samoa	Manu'a	Tu'i Manu'a vacant	6 July 1904		Elective and hereditary	
Fiji	Fiji	Tui Viti vacant			Elective and hereditary	
Indonesia	Kaimana	Rat Sran Rat Kaimana Umisi IX	2022	Aituarauw	Elective and hereditary	
Indonesia	Salawati	Herry Arfan	2019	Arfan	Elective and hereditary	
Indonesia	Sekar	Arief Rumagesan	2019	Rumagesan	Elective and hereditary	
Marshall Islands (Note: The government of the Marshall Islands recognises 12 chiefly domains, called mojen, each headed by one or several paramount chiefs. Each domain is represented in the Council of Iroij, an advisory body of traditional chiefs guaranteed by the Constitution.)	Kwajalein	Iroijlaplap Michael Kabua	19 September 2019	Kabua	Elective and hereditary	
Marshall Islands	North Ratak (Note: This domain covers the islands of Ailuk, Aur, Maloelap, Taongi, Utirik and Wotje in the Ratak Chain. Its ruling clan has also laid claim to nearby Wake Island, under the name Eneen-Kio.)	Iroijlaplap Remios Hermios	10 December 1998	Hermios	Elective and hereditary	
Federated States of Micronesia	Madolenihmw	Nahnmwarki Kerpet Ehpel (Note: This chief is normally referred to as the Isipahu.)	November 2008	Dipwinpahnmei (Note: The ruling line belongs specifically to the Inenkatau (or Upwutenmai) sept of the Dipwinpahnmei clan.)	Elective and hereditary	
Federated States of Micronesia	Sokehs	Nahnmwarki Herculano Kohler	1997	Sounkawad	Elective and hereditary	
Federated States of Micronesia	Uh	Nahnmwarki Welter John (Note: This chief is normally referred to as the Sangiro.)	30 September 1991	Lasialap (Note: The ruling line belongs specifically to the Sounpasedo sept of the Lasialap clan.)	Elective and hereditary	
New Caledonia	Kunié	High Chief vacant (Note: The position of High Chief of Kunié has been vacant since the death of Hilarion Vendégou in 2020.)	11 January 2020	Vao (Note: A Kanak dynasty.)	Hereditary	
New Caledonia	Maré	High Chief Dokucas Naisseline	6 June 2007	Naisseline (Note: The Naisseline family is a branch of the Netché, a tribe of Kanaks.)	Hereditary (Note: The throne of the grand chef on Maré Island is traditionally held by the chief of Guahma district, an hereditary position.)	
New Caledonia	Lifou	High Chief Evanes Boula	13 June 1999	Boula	Hereditary (Note: The throne of the grand chef on Lifou Island, which also rules Ouvéa, is traditionally held by the chief of Lössi district, an hereditary position.)	
New Zealand	Kīngitanga (Note: Commonly referred to as the "Māori King Movement". Its elected ariki nui is often called the "Māori King" due to his nationalistic influence over all Māori tribes as a symbol of unity. This title is not officially recognised by the government of New Zealand.)	Arikinui Nga wai hono i te po	5 September 2024	Te Wherowhero (Note: Te Wherowhero is the lineage of the first king. It belongs to the Waikato iwi, which is part of the Tainui confederation.)	Elective and hereditary (Note: The monarch is appointed for life by the chiefs of the tribes involved in the Kīngitanga movement. Traditionally, selection is limited to direct descendants of the first king: Pōtatau I, of the Waikato tribe. However, in principle inheritance is open to any lineage should the electing chiefs be in agreement.)	
New Zealand	Tūwharetoa	Arikinui Te Rangimaheu Te Heuheu Tūkino IX	September 2025	Te Heuheu	Hereditary	
Palau (Note: Palau is divided into 16 traditional polities. The 16-seat Council of Chiefs, made up of the traditional chiefs from each constituent state, is an advisory body to the President. The chiefs of Koror and Melekeok, the highest chiefs from Eoueldaob and Babeldaob respectively, are recognised as the two paramount chiefs of the nation.)	Koror	vacant		Ngerekldeu (Note: This is not the name of the ruling house or clan: it is the ritual name used by the successive chiefs from this lineage.)	Elective and Hereditary (Note: Chiefs are selected by the most senior women of the ruling clan.)	
Palau	Melekeok	Reklai Bao Ngirmang	1998	Ngetelngal	Elective and Hereditary	
Samoa (Note: There are four paramount chiefs in Samoa, each presiding over a royal lineage (Tama a 'Āiga) of past kings. Chiefs are afforded considerable power. The national parliament, the Fono, is composed exclusively of chiefly titleholders (matai). The office of head of state (the O le Ao o le Malo) is traditionally reserved for the paramount chiefs, although this is not required by the Constitution.)		Tui Ātua Tupua Tamasese Efi (Note: Tufuga Efi has held the chiefly title of Tui Atua Fa'asavali since 1 July 1983. He served as head of state from 2007 to 2017.)	November 1986	Sā Tupua	Elective and hereditary	
Samoa		Tuimalealiʻifano Vaʻaletoʻa Sualauvi II (Note: Vaʻaletoʻa Sualauvi II has been the head of state since 21 July 2017.)	July 1977	Sā Tuimalealiʻifano	Elective and hereditary	
Samoa		vacant (Note: The throne of the Mata'afa has been vacant since 1997; little other information is available.)	December 1997	Sā Mataʻafa	Elective and hereditary	
Samoa		Malietoa Moli II	16 August 2018	Sā Mālietoa	Elective and hereditary (Note: The lineage associated with this title consists of three branches: Sa Moli, Sa Talavou and Sa Natuitasina (also spelled Gatuitasina). As the succession law dictates, heirs of all three branches are equally entitled to hold the title, and accession of an heir to the title is subject to nomination and consensus from all three branches. The most recent titleholders have been from the Moli sept.)	
French Polynesia	Tahiti	Teriʻihinoiatua Joinville Hinoiariki Pomare XI	19 April 2023	Pōmare	Elective and hereditary	
Tuvalu (Note: Each island or atoll has a traditional high chief, the ulu-aliki, who is recognised by and plays an active ceremonial role in the national government. Thrones are primarily elective, but candidates are limited to members of a number of chiefly clans.)	Funafuti	Aliki Siaosi Finiki			Elective and hereditary (Note: Funafuti's traditional chieftaincy is limited to senior members of two chiefly clans: Te Aliki a Mua, and Te Aliki a Muli. By custom, succession rotates between the two lineages.)	
Tuvalu	Nanumanga	Aliki Talivai Sovola		Mouhala	Elective and hereditary	
Tuvalu	Nanumea	Aliki Iliala Lima			Elective and hereditary (Note: The high chief, or Pulefenua, is elected by a council of chiefs (the Fale Kaupule) from senior members of Nanumea's seven chiefly clans, all of which claim descent from the first settlers.)	
Tuvalu	Niutao	Aliki Iosefa Lagafaoa			Elective and hereditary	
Tuvalu	Nui	Aliki Falani Mekuli			Elective and hereditary	
Tuvalu	Nukufetau	Aliki Valoaga Fonotapu			Elective and hereditary	
Tuvalu	Nukulaelae	Aliki Aifou Tafia			Elective and hereditary	
Tuvalu	Vaitupu	Aliki Londoni Panapa			Elective and hereditary	
Wallis and Futuna	Alo	Tuʻi Lino Leleivai	29 November 2018	Lalolalo	Elective and hereditary (Note: The king is elected by a council of chiefs from the senior members of the kingdom's four chiefly clans.)	
Wallis and Futuna	Sigave	Tuʻi Eufenio Takala	5 March 2016	Vanai	Elective and hereditary (Note: The king is elected by a council of chiefs from the senior members of the kingdom's three chiefly clans: the Tamole, the Keletaona, and the Safoka.)	
Wallis and Futuna	Uvea	Tuʻi Felice Tominiko Halagahu (co-claimant)	16 April 2016	Takumasiva	Elective and hereditary (Note: The king is elected, traditionally for ten years, by a council of ministers from the senior members of the kingdom's royal clans. These clans correspond to the three districts of the island: Hahake, Hihifo, and Muʻa. The present king is of the Hihifo clan.)	
Wallis and Futuna	Uvea	Tuʻi Patalione Kanimoa (co-claimant)	17 April 2016	Takumasiva	Elective and hereditary	

=== Cook Islands ===
Each major atoll in the Cook Islands has a number of arikis, ceremonial high chiefs who together form the Are Ariki, a parliamentary advisory body with up to 24 seats. The only domains not listed below are those of Manuae, on which current information is inadequate, and Penrhyn, whose chiefly line is extinct. Styles and names are listed in their conventional local form. In addition to the generic title of ariki, which is worn at the end of one's name, each chiefly line carries its own unique style, which is placed at the beginning. Thus, if the chief's name is "Henry" and his title is "Ngamaru", he is styled "Ngamaru Henry Ariki".

State	Polity	Monarch	Since	House	Succession	Refs
Cook Islands	Aitutaki	Manarangi Tutai Ariki	2000	Vaipaepae o Pau	Hereditary	
Cook Islands	Aitutaki	Tamatoa Purua Ariki			Hereditary	
Cook Islands	Aitutaki	Vaeruarangi Teaukura Ariki			Hereditary	
Cook Islands	Atiu	Parua Mataio Kea Ariki		Nurau	Hereditary	
Cook Islands	Atiu	Rongomatane Ada Ariki (Note: Her full name is "Ada Teaupurepure Tetupu".)	1972	Paruarangi	Hereditary	
Cook Islands	Atiu	Ngamaru Tupuna Ariki	2021	Te Akatuira	Hereditary	
Cook Islands	Mangaia	Numangatini Tereapii Ariki	29 August 2020	Nga Ariki	Hereditary	
Cook Islands	Manihiki (Note: The two high chiefs on Manihiki also traditionally reign over neighbouring Rakahanga. They represent the populace of both islands in the area Ariki.)	Te Fakaheo Ariki (Note: The title is also often written as Whakaheo Ariki.)		Hukutahu (Note: Arikis of this line belong to either the Numatua or Tiangarotonga tribes.)	Hereditary	
Cook Islands	Manihiki	vacant (Note: The throne of Te Faingaitu Ariki (alternatively Whaingaitu) is vacant. It is apparently disputed between members of the eligible tribes, but no information is available on the claimants.)		Matangaro (Note: Arikis of this line belong to either the Heahiro or Mokopuwai tribes.)	Hereditary	
Cook Islands	Mauke	Tamuera Ariki (Note: Sources are unclear on the name of the current Tamuera Ariki (often written Samuela Ariki).)		Nurau	Hereditary	
Cook Islands	Mauke	Tararo Temaeva Ariki (Note: His name is sometimes written "Te Maeva" or simply "Maeva".)		Paruarangi	Hereditary	
Cook Islands	Mauke	Te Au Marae Ariki		Te Akatuira	Hereditary	
Cook Islands	Mitiaro	Tou Travel Ariki		Nurau	Hereditary	
Cook Islands	Mitiaro	Tetava Poitirere Ariki		Paruarangi	Hereditary	
Cook Islands	Mitiaro	Temaeu Teikamata Ariki	20 February 1985	Te Akatuira	Hereditary	
Cook Islands	Pukapuka	Aliki Makirai Henry	June 2022	Pukapuka	Hereditary	
Cook Islands	Rarotonga	Makea Vakatini Phillip Ngamatoa Ariki	20 July 2020	Te Au o Tonga	Hereditary	
Cook Islands	Rarotonga	George Taripo Karika Ariki	13 December 2018	Te Au o Tonga	Hereditary	
Cook Islands	Rarotonga	vacant (Note: The Makea Nui Ariki is one of three high chiefs in the Te Au o Tonga tribe on Rarotonga. The previous ariki died in 1994, and her successor has yet to be agreed upon. Several members of the tribe claim rightful inheritance of the title. Succession is traditionally limited to the Rangi Makea clan; the three other clans of the tribe (Sadaraka, Mere and Upokotokoa) are considered junior branches. Mere Maraea MacQuarrie, the youngest daughter of the last ariki, is the only known claimant from the Rangi Makea clan, and is apparently the contender most likely to be granted the title. Other contenders include Stanley Adam Hunt, Yolande Browne, and Matapo Oti Oti, all of whom claim descent from the earlier arikis. The first of these, Hunt, was "invested" with the Makea Nui title under the regnal name "Takaia Tutavake"; the ceremony, which took place 16 May 2009, was not recognised by the government.)	1994	Te Au o Tonga	Hereditary	
Cook Islands	Rarotonga	Pa Tapaeru Marie Ariki (Note: Her full regnal name is "Tapaeru Teariki Upokotini Marie", most commonly known as "Pa Marie".)	27 June 1990	Takitumu	Hereditary	
Cook Islands	Rarotonga	Kainuku Kapiriterangi Ariki	6 May 2006	Takitumu	Hereditary	
Cook Islands	Rarotonga	Tinomana Tokerau Ariki	21 Nov 2013	Puaikura (Note: There are three separate lineages eligible for the Puaikura Royalty, all of which descend from Tinomana Enuarurutini (c. 1820–1854) the King of Puaikura and one of his three wives. They are (in order of seniority): Te Pori a Pa, Oakirangi, and Akaiti a Rua. The current Tinomana Ariki revert to the first and only married wife "Te Pori a Pa line".)	Hereditary	

=== Others ===
In Fiji, which became a colony of the United Kingdom in 1874, the British monarchs were historically bestowed the title Tui Viti, which translates as "King of Fiji" or "Paramount Chief of Fiji". The last holder of the title (from 6 February 1952) was Queen Elizabeth II, of the House of Windsor. The state became a republic in 1987, abolishing the title by establishing a new constitution. The former Great Council of Chiefs, however, still recognised Elizabeth II as Tui Viti, as the nation's traditional queen and its supreme tribal chief, despite no longer holding a constitutional office. Consequently, while Fiji remains a republic, a monarch or paramount chief is still recognised by traditional tribal politics. The Queen made no official claim to the Tui Viti throne, although until at least 2002, she remained open to the possibility of a constitutional restoration of the monarchy.

Native chiefs in Fiji are considered members of the nobility. The House of Chiefs, consisting of about 70 chiefs of various rank determined by a loosely defined order of precedence, was modeled after the British House of Lords. Tongan chiefs, subordinate to a king, are also considered nobles and have therefore been excluded from the above list.

In American Samoa there are 14 paramount chiefs, with Manu'a traditionally subordinate to the Tu'i Manu'a, a title that is now considered purely historical; the last titleholder, Elisala, died 2 July 1909. The paramount chiefly titles are: on Tutuila, Faumuina, Lei'ato, Letuli, Fuimaono, Tuitele, Satele, Mauga, and in the Manu'a Islands, Laolagi, Aso'au, Lefiti, Sotoa, Galea'i, Misa and Tuiolosega.

== See also ==
- Ethnarch
- Heads of former ruling families
- Imperial, royal and noble ranks
- List of current monarchs of sovereign states
- List of current reigning monarchs by length of reign
- List of monarchies
- Lists of monarchs
- Traditional authority
- List of current sovereign monarchs
- List of longest reigning current monarchs
