= United States Department of Justice Tax Division =

Governing body in the US department of Justice

- Seal of the United States Department of Justice

Division overview
- Formed: 1934; 92 years ago
- Jurisdiction: Federal government of the United States
- Headquarters: Robert F. Kennedy Department of Justice Building; 950 Pennsylvania Avenue NW; Washington, D.C., United States
- Division executive: David A. Hubbert, Acting Assistant Attorney General
- Parent department: U.S. Department of Justice
- Website: justice.gov/tax

The United States Department of Justice Tax Division is a division of the United States Department of Justice. It is responsible for the prosecution of both civil and criminal cases arising under the Internal Revenue Code and other tax laws of the United States. The Division began operation in 1934, under United States attorney general Homer Stille Cummings, who charged it with primary responsibility for supervising all federal litigation involving internal revenue (following an executive order from President Franklin Delano Roosevelt).

== Responsibilities ==
The Tax Division works closely with public schools and corporations of the state and the Criminal Investigation Division and other units of the Internal Revenue Service to develop and coordinate federal tax policy. Among the Division's duties are:

- Participating in the President's Corporate Fraud Task Force
  - Working with the Securities and Exchange Commission to promote corporate integrity
  - Pursuing criminal tax investigations and prosecutions of corporate executives
- Handling criminal investigations and prosecutions of terrorist financing cases
- Fighting abusive and fraudulent tax promotions
  - Seeking civil injunctions against promoters of abusive tax schemes
  - Handling criminal prosecutions of major tax fraud promoters
  - Working with the Federal Trade Commission to combat internet fraud schemes
  - Using both civil and criminal tools to put tax fraud promoters out of business
- Enforcing IRS summonses for records of corporate tax shelters
- Attacking the use of foreign bank accounts to evade taxes
  - Enforcing IRS summonses for records of offshore credit card transactions
  - Initiating criminal investigations of suspects in offshore tax evasion cases
- Combating schemes that cheat the IRS through abuse of the bankruptcy system
- Enhancing policy coordination between the Tax Division and the IRS

=== Current programs ===
In August 2013, the Justice Department announced their Swiss bank program, which "provides Swiss banks an opportunity to come forward, cooperate, disclose their illegal conduct, and be eligible for non-prosecution agreements -- or in egregious cases, deferred prosecution agreements."

The offshore voluntary disclosure program is for individual taxpayers to come forward and pay owed taxes on undisclosed income. However, National Taxpayer Advocate Nina E. Olson advocated changes to this program to encourage account holders of accounts with small balances to come forward.

== Leadership ==
The current Acting Assistant Attorney General is David A. Hubbert, the division's incumbent Deputy Assistant Attorney General (DAAG) for Civil Trial Matters.

On February 4, 2020, President Donald Trump nominated Richard E. Zuckerman as Assistant Attorney General to head the Tax Division, a post that requires Senate confirmation. Zuckerman left the post on January 20, 2021. He was previously appointed Principal Deputy Assistant Attorney General and Deputy Assistant Attorney General for Criminal Matters of the Tax Division on December 18, 2017. He succeeded Caroline D. Ciraolo, former Acting Assistant Attorney General, who left the Tax Division in January 2017.

== Organization ==
The head of the Tax Division is an Assistant Attorney General, who is appointed by the President of the United States. The Assistant Attorney General is assisted by four Deputy Assistant Attorneys General, who are each career attorneys, who each oversee a different branch of the Tax Division's sections.

- Assistant Attorney General for Tax Division
  - Deputy Assistant Attorney General for Policy and Planning
    - Office of Legislation, Policy and Management
    - Office of Training and Career Development
    - Office of Management and Administration
  - Deputy Assistant Attorney General for Criminal Matters
    - Northern Criminal Enforcement Section
    - Southern Criminal Enforcement Section
    - Western Criminal Enforcement Section
    - Criminal Appeals and Tax Enforcement Policy Section
  - Deputy Assistant Attorney General for Review and Appellate
    - Civil Appellate Section
    - Office of Review
  - Deputy Assistant Attorney General for Civil Matters
    - Central Civil Trial Section
    - Eastern Civil Trial Section
    - Northern Civil Trial Section
    - Southern Civil Trial Section
    - Southwestern Civil Trial Section
    - Western Civil Trial Section
    - Court of Federal Claims Section
