= Promethians =

Promethian

In-universe information
- Home world: Phase World (Corkscrew Galaxy)
- Capital: Center
- Language: Promethian
- Currency: Credits

The Promethians are a fictional race of aliens featured in the Rifts role-playing game from Palladium Books. They reside in an intergalactic region of space known as the Three Galaxies, which is located in an extradimensional universe. Promethians first appeared in Rifts Dimension Book Two: Phase World, authored by C. J. Carella and published December 1994.

== Planetary government ==
The Promethians are the natives of a planet called Phase World, and are the undisputed masters and administrators of the transdimensional city of Center, a super-metropolis that stands thousands of feet high and covers many tens of miles in land area. The Promethians allow only the Draconid and Phantom races to co-exist outside of this massive arcology; the rest of the populace is not allowed to roam any part of Phase World's surface outside of Center – which holds over 600 million inhabitants from species throughout the Palladium Megaverse.

For reasons unknown, the Promethians do very little to restrict activities within Center itself; absolutely anything is allowed within the arcology, including but not limited to mass starvation, slavery, murder, and cannibalism. The only time that the Promethians show any interest in the goings-on of Center is when an enemy force tries to take control of the transdimensional spacegates and rifts, or when a conquering force attempts to take over Phase World altogether. On one occasion, the Promethians allowed a civil war to be waged for two years within Center's confines, killing over thirty million of its inhabitants; the Promethians' only course of action was to selectively apply a series of force fields to keep the fighting from reaching the spaceports or from breaking out of Center and spilling out onto the planet's surface. Furthermore, the Promethians are well known for selling their technology to any buyer that can afford it, friend or foe, and in similar fashion neither help nor hinder fugitives that manage to reach Center – or any bounty hunters and law enforcement agents that may be pursuing them.

It is strongly implied that the Promethians are concerned first and foremost about cosmic-level threats to the entire Megaverse, such as the effort to keep the Old Ones from waking, and that "little things" like world-spanning wars and "morality" are simply too much of a distraction from the importance of their universal mission.

== Powers and abilities ==
Promethians are a notable species in that they are always in a constant state of partial phase – unlike most characters in contemporary literature with the ability to phase – which serves to greatly reduce any damage dealt to them. Furthermore, by using the natural phase powers innate to their species, they can at times opt to completely phase themselves, eliminating any threat to their person by phasing out of sync with the dimension that they're in. This allows them to choose whether to walk through solid matter or to render themselves completely invisible and undetectable by all means, including magic.

The Promethians exist in two forms: namely, first- and second-stage Promethians. First-stage Promethians are 7 feet (2.1 m) to 10 feet (3.0 m) tall, are entirely "human" in the range of possible outlooks and alignments, and the natural phase abilities of their bodies renders any force or energies directed against them to cause no more than a point-for-point conversion to "Standard Damage Capacity" (termed S.D.C. in the Palladium game setting), no matter how powerful the originating force.

Those Promethians that manage to survive and pass the Test of Maturity are transformed into larger, more durable versions of their old selves that range from 15 feet (4.6 m) to 30 feet (9.1 m) in height. These creatures are immune to S.D.C. weapons; they each gain up to 2,400 points of what is termed "Mega Damage Capacity" (M.D.C.), and all attacks directed at them inflict only one-quarter damage, no matter how powerful the originating force. Second-stage Promethians make up the majority of the Promethians on the planet outside Center (actually, second-stage Promethians are found nowhere else in the Megaverse except on Phase World), and it is they who are the ones tasked with the universal mission of identifying and countering the greatest threats to the Megaverse. Second-stagers are also the ones who are possessed of "an alien way of thinking" and do not live by morals as most other sentient beings understand them; they are prepared to do whatever it takes to safeguard the Megaverse, even if their actions appear "evil" to outside observers.
