= Quatloo =

Quatloo may refer to:

- Quatloos.com, an internet fraud awareness website
- A currency used in the Star Trek episode "The Gamesters of Triskelion"
