= Monarchy =

Form of government ruled by a monarch, or a polity with this form of government

A monarchy is a hereditary form of government in which political power is legally passed on to the family members of the monarch, a head of state who rules for life. Different monarchs can have varying amounts of power, such as being entirely ceremonial, having the powers of executive or having absolute power. While monarchs gain their power via various hereditary succession laws, they can also gain their authority via election.

Monarchies have been a common form of government during some historical periods. Nearly half of all independent states at the start of the 19th century were monarchies. After reaching a peak in the middle of the 19th century, the proportion of monarchies in the world has steadily declined. Republics replaced many monarchies, notably at the end of World War I and World War II.

There are conventionally two types of monarchy: absolute monarchy and constitutional monarchy. Absolute monarchies, of which there are approximately twelve subnational ones, are governed as autocracies. Most of the modern monarchies are constitutional monarchies, retaining under a constitution unique legal and ceremonial roles for monarchs exercising limited or no political power, similar to heads of state in a parliamentary republic.

== Etymology ==
The word monarch first appeared in English in the mid-15th century as monark, meaning "a supreme governor for life, a sole or autocratic ruler of a state." It comes from the Old French monarche (14th century, Modern French monarque) and directly from the Late Latin monarcha, which in turn derives from the Greek monarkhēs, meaning "one who rules alone" (see monarchy). The term monarchy dates back to the mid-14th century, when it referred to a kingdom or territory ruled by a monarch, and by the late 14th century it also meant rule by a single person with supreme power. It comes from Old French monarchie (13th century), meaning "sovereignty" or "absolute power," which was borrowed from Late Latin monarchia and ultimately from Greek monarkhia, "absolute rule," literally "ruling of one," from monos ("alone") and arkhein ("to rule").

== History ==
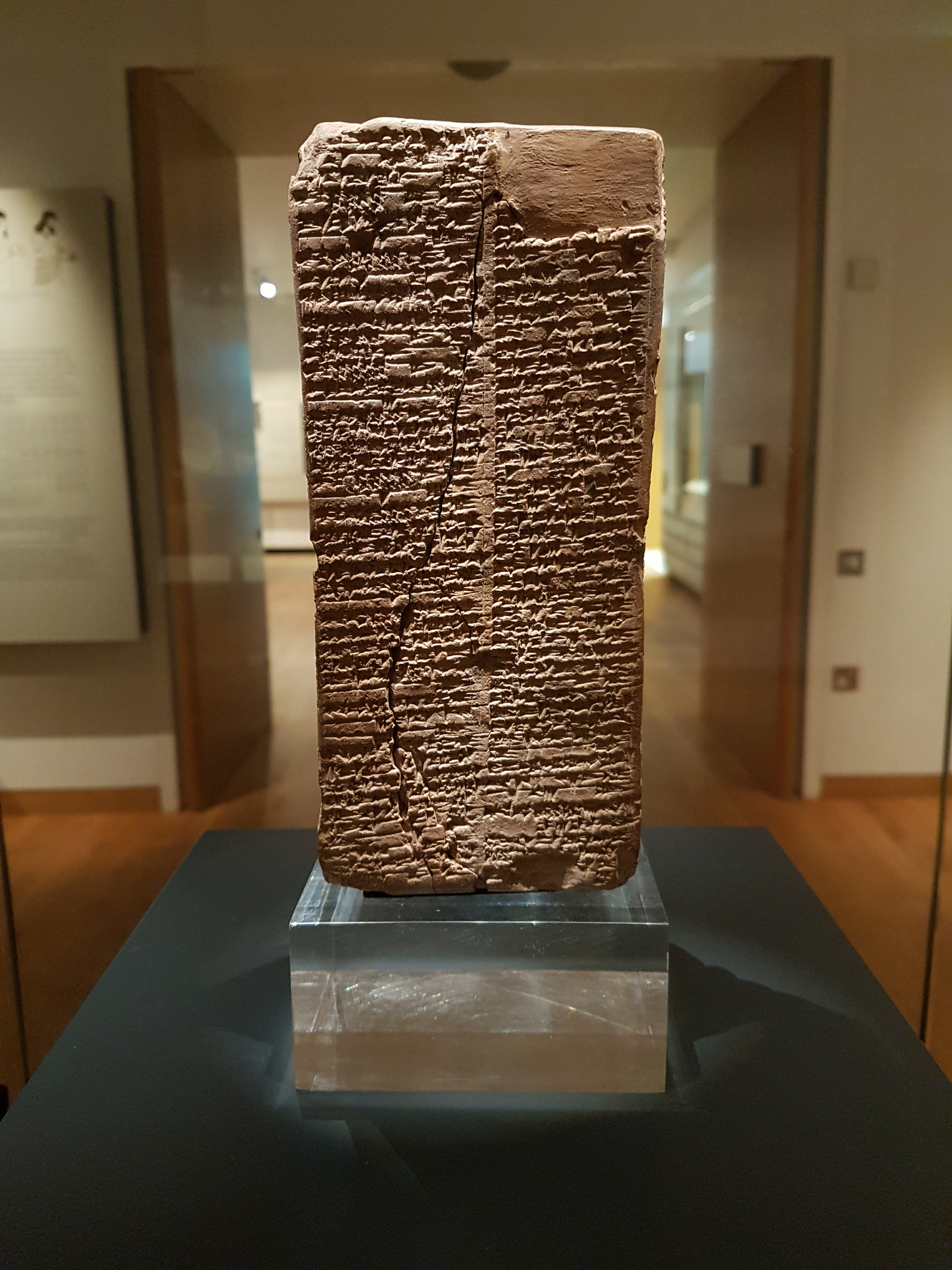
The Weld-Blundell Prism, inscribed with the Sumerian King List

The similar form of societal hierarchy known as chiefdom or tribal kingship is prehistoric. Chiefdoms provided the concept of state formation, which started with civilizations such as Mesopotamia, Ancient Egypt and the Indus Valley civilization. In some parts of the world, chiefdoms became monarchies. Some of the oldest recorded and evidenced monarchies were those of Narmer, Pharaoh of Ancient Egypt c. 3100 BCE, and Enmebaragesi, a Sumerian King of Kish c. 2600 BCE.

From the earliest records, monarchs could be directly hereditary, while others were elected from among eligible members. With the Egyptian, Chinese, Indian, Mesopotamian, Sudanic, reconstructed Proto-Indo-European religion, but not others, the monarch held sacral functions directly connected to sacrifice and was sometimes identified with having divine ancestry, possibly establishing a notion of the divine right of kings.

Polybius identified monarchy as one of three "benign" basic forms of government (monarchy, aristocracy, and democracy), opposed to the three "malignant" basic forms of government (tyranny, oligarchy, and ochlocracy). The monarch in classical antiquity is often identified as "king" or "ruler" (translating archon, basileus, rex, tyrannos, etc.) or as "queen" (basilinna, basilissa, basileia or basilis; regina). Polybius originally understood monarchy as a component of republics, but since antiquity monarchy has contrasted with forms of republic, where executive power is wielded by free citizens and their assemblies. The 4th-century BCE Hindu text Arthasastra laid out the ethics of monarchism. In antiquity, some monarchies were abolished in favor of such assemblies in Rome (Roman Republic, 509 BCE).

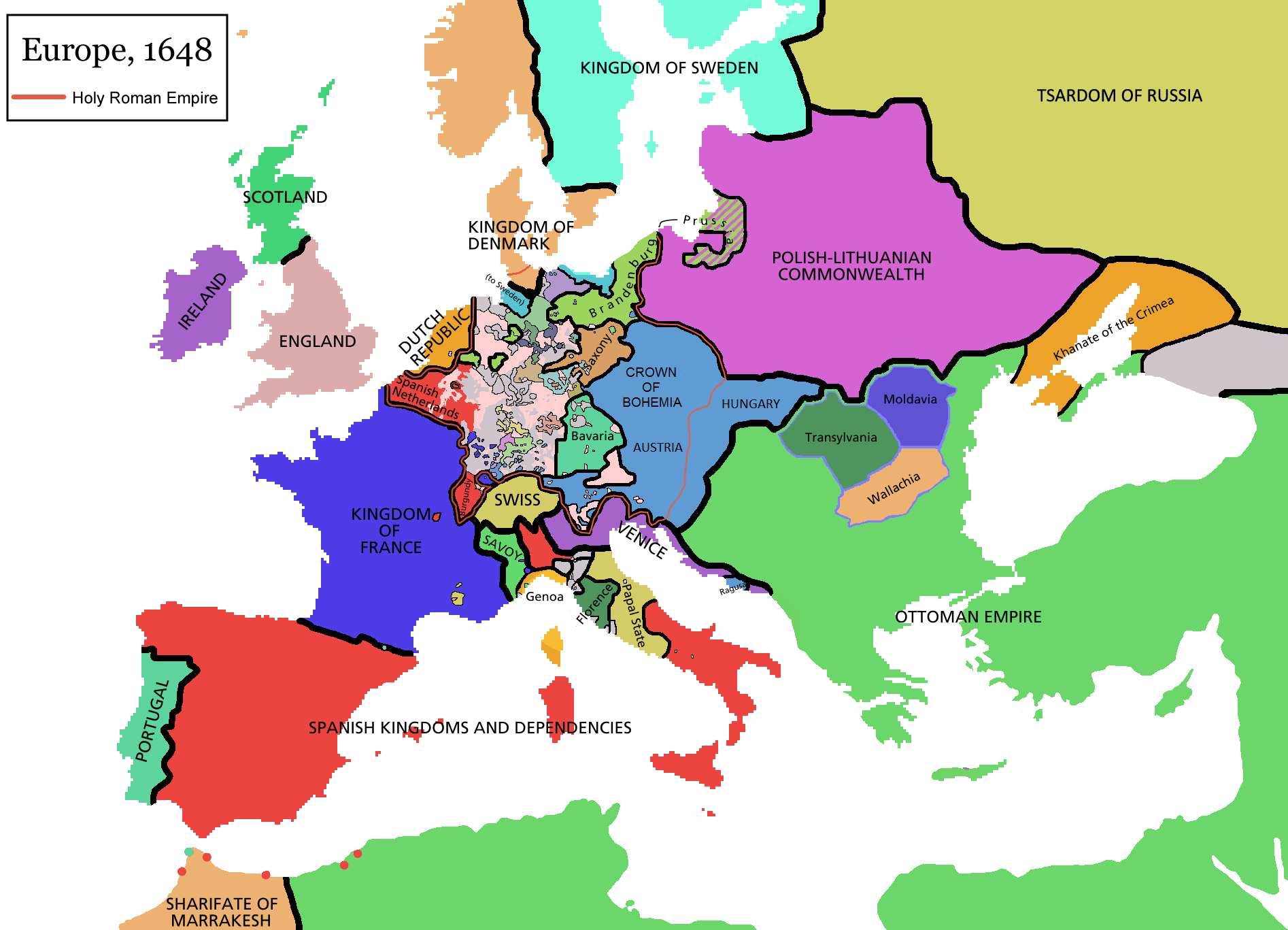
Map of monarchies and republics in Europe, 1648

By the 17th century, monarchy was challenged by evolving parliamentarism e.g. through regional assemblies (such as the Icelandic Commonwealth, the Swiss Landsgemeinde and later Tagsatzung, and the High Medieval communal movement linked to the rise of medieval town privileges) and by modern anti-monarchism e.g. of the temporary overthrow of the English monarchy by the Parliament of England in 1649, the American Revolution of 1776 and the French Revolution of 1789. One of many opponents of that trend was Elizabeth Dawbarn, whose anonymous Dialogue between Clara Neville and Louisa Mills, on Loyalty (1794) features "silly Louisa, who admires liberty, Tom Paine and the US, [who is] lectured by Clara on God's approval of monarchy" and on the influence women can exert on men.

Since then advocacy of the abolition of a monarchy or respectively of republics has been called republicanism, while the advocacy of monarchies is called monarchism. As such republics have become the opposing and alternative form of government to monarchy, despite some having seen infringements through lifelong or even hereditary heads of state, such as in North Korea. Historically there have also been monarchical republics, such as the Dutch Republic, and republican monarchies, such as the Polish-Lithuanian Commonwealth and Sweden during the Age of Liberty (1719–1772).

In 1848, there were a wave of revolutions which resulted in many monarchies being abolished.

Today forty-three sovereign nations in the world have a monarch, including fifteen Commonwealth realms that have Charles III as the head of state. Most modern monarchs are constitutional monarchs, who retain a unique legal and ceremonial role but exercise limited or no political power under a constitution. Many are so-called crowned republics, surviving particularly in small states.

In some nations, however, such as Morocco, Qatar, Liechtenstein, and Thailand, the hereditary monarch has more political influence than any other single source of authority in the state.

According to a 2020 study, monarchy arose as a system of governance because of an efficiency in governing large populations and expansive territories during periods when coordinating such populations was difficult. The authors argue that monarchy declined as an efficient regime type with innovations in communications and transportation technology, as the efficiency of monarchy relative to other regime types declined.

According to a 2023 study, monarchy has persisted as a regime type because it can accommodate demands for democratization better than other forms of autocratic rule: "Monarchies can democratize without destabilizing the leadership through transitioning to a democratic constitutional monarchy. The prospect of retaining the ruler appeals to opposition groups who value both democracy and stability, but it also has implications for their ability to organize and sustain mass protest."

== Characteristics and role ==
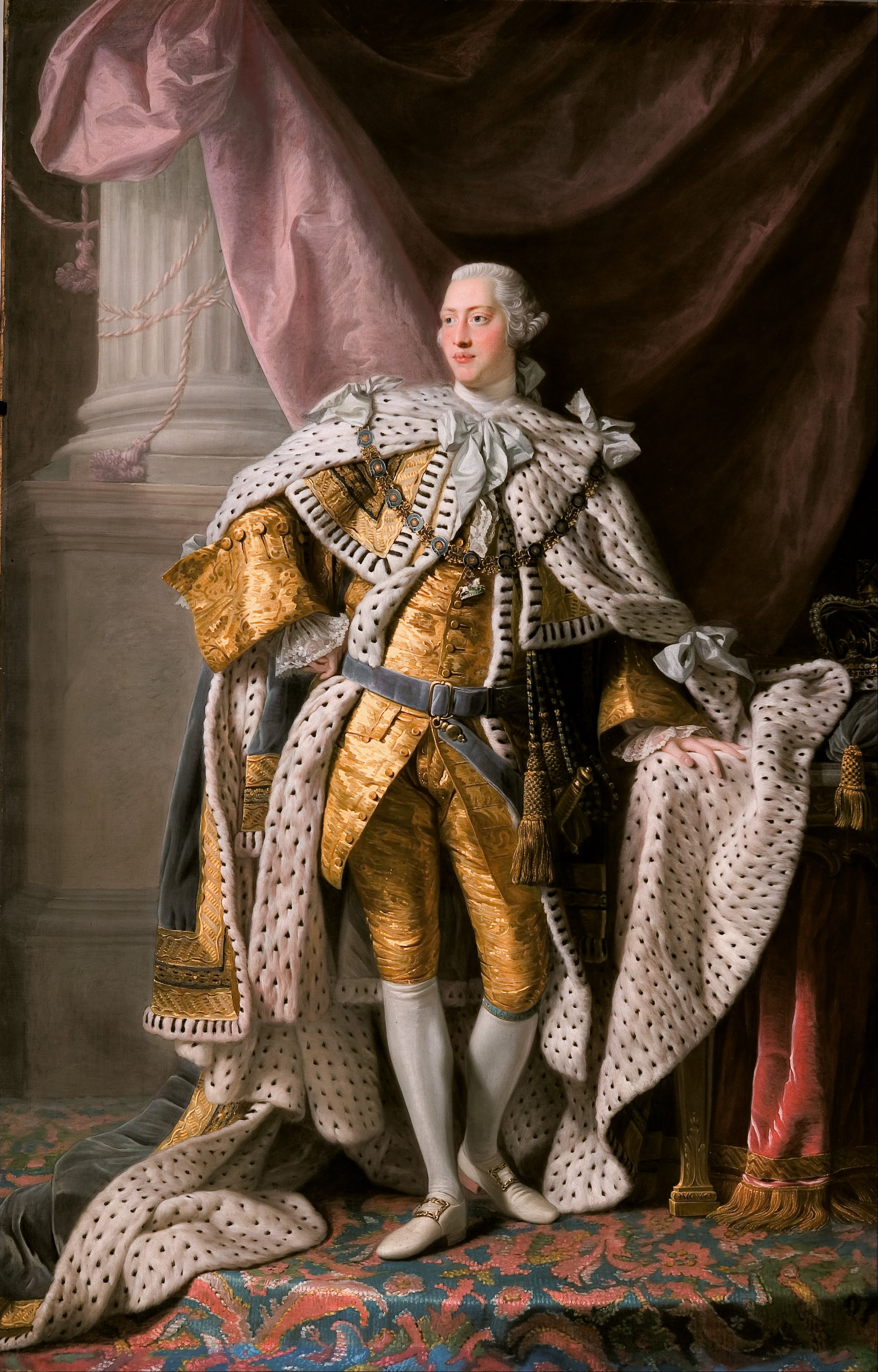
King George III of the United Kingdom, coronation portrait by Allan Ramsay, 1762

Monarchies are associated with hereditary reign, in which monarchs reign for life and the responsibilities and power of the position pass to their child or another member of their family when they die. Most monarchs, both historically and in the modern-day, have been born and brought up within a royal family, the centre of the royal household and court. Growing up in a royal family (called a dynasty when it continues for several generations), future monarchs are often trained for their expected future responsibilities as monarch.

Different systems of hereditary succession have been used, such as proximity of blood, primogeniture, and agnatic seniority (Salic law). While most monarchs in history have been male, many female monarchs also have reigned.

Some monarchies are not hereditary. In an elective monarchy, monarchs are elected or appointed by some body (an electoral college) for life or a defined period. Four elective monarchies exist today: Cambodia, Malaysia and the United Arab Emirates are 20th-century creations, while one (the papacy) is ancient.

A self-proclaimed monarchy is established when a person claims the monarchy without any historical ties to a previous dynasty. There are examples of republican leaders who have proclaimed themselves monarchs: Napoleon I of France declared himself Emperor of the French and ruled the First French Empire after having held the title of First Consul of the French Republic for five years from his seizing power in the coup of 18 Brumaire. President Jean-Bédel Bokassa of the Central African Republic declared himself Emperor of the Central African Empire in 1976. Yuan Shikai, the first formal President of the Republic of China, crowned himself Emperor of the short-lived "Empire of China" a few years after the Republic of China was founded.

=== Powers of the monarch ===
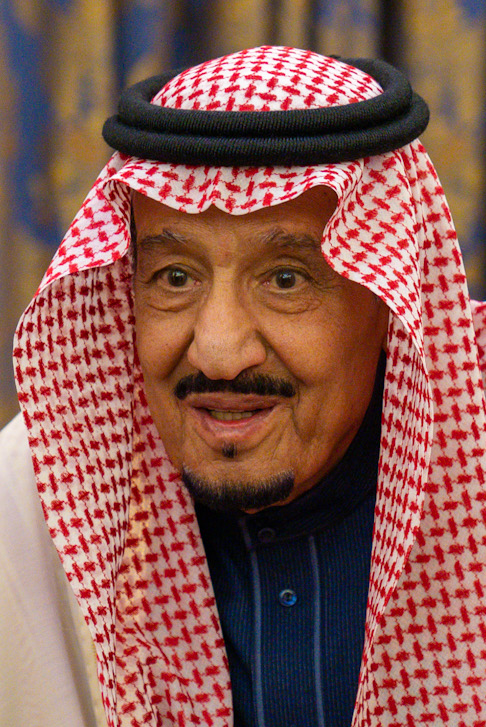
King Salman of Saudi Arabia is an absolute monarch.

- In an absolute monarchy, the monarch rules with absolute power over the state and government.
- In a constitutional monarchy, the monarch's power is subject to a constitution. In most current constitutional monarchies, the monarch is mainly a ceremonial figurehead symbol of national unity and state continuity.
  - Semi-constitutional monarchies exhibit fewer parliamentary powers or simply monarchs with more authority.

== Succession ==
=== Hereditary monarchies ===
Current European monarchies by succession method: Absolute primogeniture Male-preference cognatic primogeniture, to be changed to absolute primogeniture Male-preference cognatic primogeniture Agnatic primogeniture Elective

In a hereditary monarchy, the position of monarch is inherited according to a statutory or customary order of succession, usually within one royal family tracing its origin through a historical dynasty or bloodline. This usually means that the heir to the throne is known well in advance of becoming monarch to ensure a smooth succession.

Primogeniture, in which the eldest child of the monarch is first in line to become monarch, is the most common system in hereditary monarchy. The order of succession is usually affected by rules on gender. Historically "agnatic primogeniture" or "patrilineal primogeniture" was favored, that is inheritance according to seniority of birth among the sons of a monarch or head of family, with sons and their male issue inheriting before brothers and their male issue, to the total exclusion of females and descendants through females from succession. This complete exclusion of females from dynastic succession is commonly referred to as application of the Salic law. Another variation on agnatic primogeniture was the so-called semi-Salic law, or "agnatic-cognatic primogeniture", which allowed women to succeed only at the extinction of all the male descendants in the male line of the particular legislator.

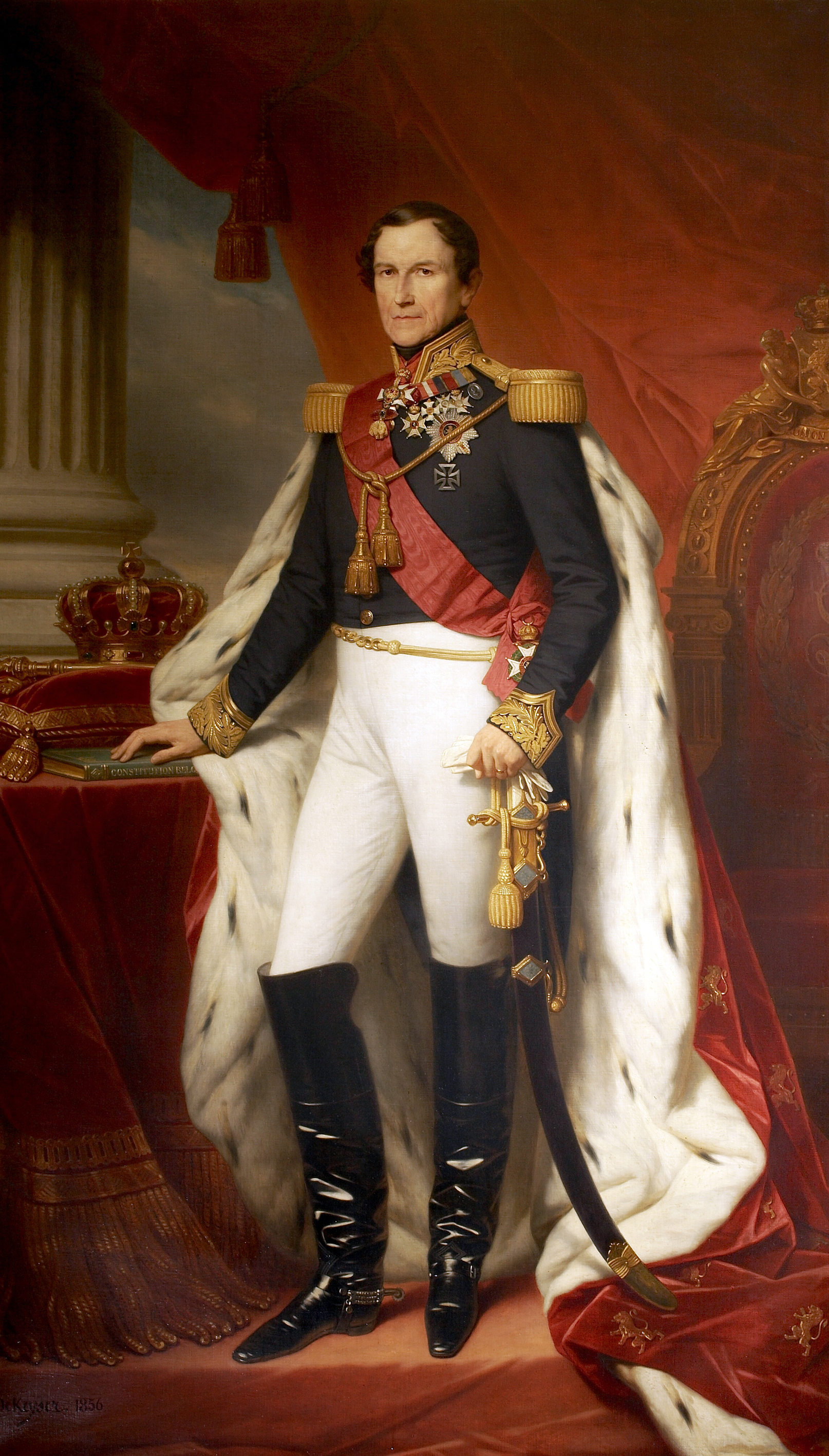
King Leopold I, an elected founder of the hereditary monarchy of Belgium

In 1980, Sweden became the first monarchy to declare equal (full cognatic) primogeniture, meaning that the eldest child of the monarch, whether female or male, ascends to the throne. Other kingdoms (such as the Netherlands in 1983, Norway in 1990, Belgium in 1991, Denmark in 2009, and Luxembourg in 2011) have since followed suit. The United Kingdom adopted absolute (equal) primogeniture (subject to the claims of existing heirs) on April 25, 2013, following agreement by the prime ministers of the sixteen Commonwealth Realms at the 22nd Commonwealth Heads of Government Meeting.

Other hereditary systems of succession included tanistry, which is semi-elective and gives weight to merit and Agnatic seniority. In some monarchies, such as Saudi Arabia, succession to the throne first passes to the monarch's next eldest brother, and only after that to the monarch's children (agnatic seniority). On June 21, 2017, King Salman of Saudi Arabia revolted against this style of monarchy and elected his son to inherit the throne.

=== Elective monarchies ===
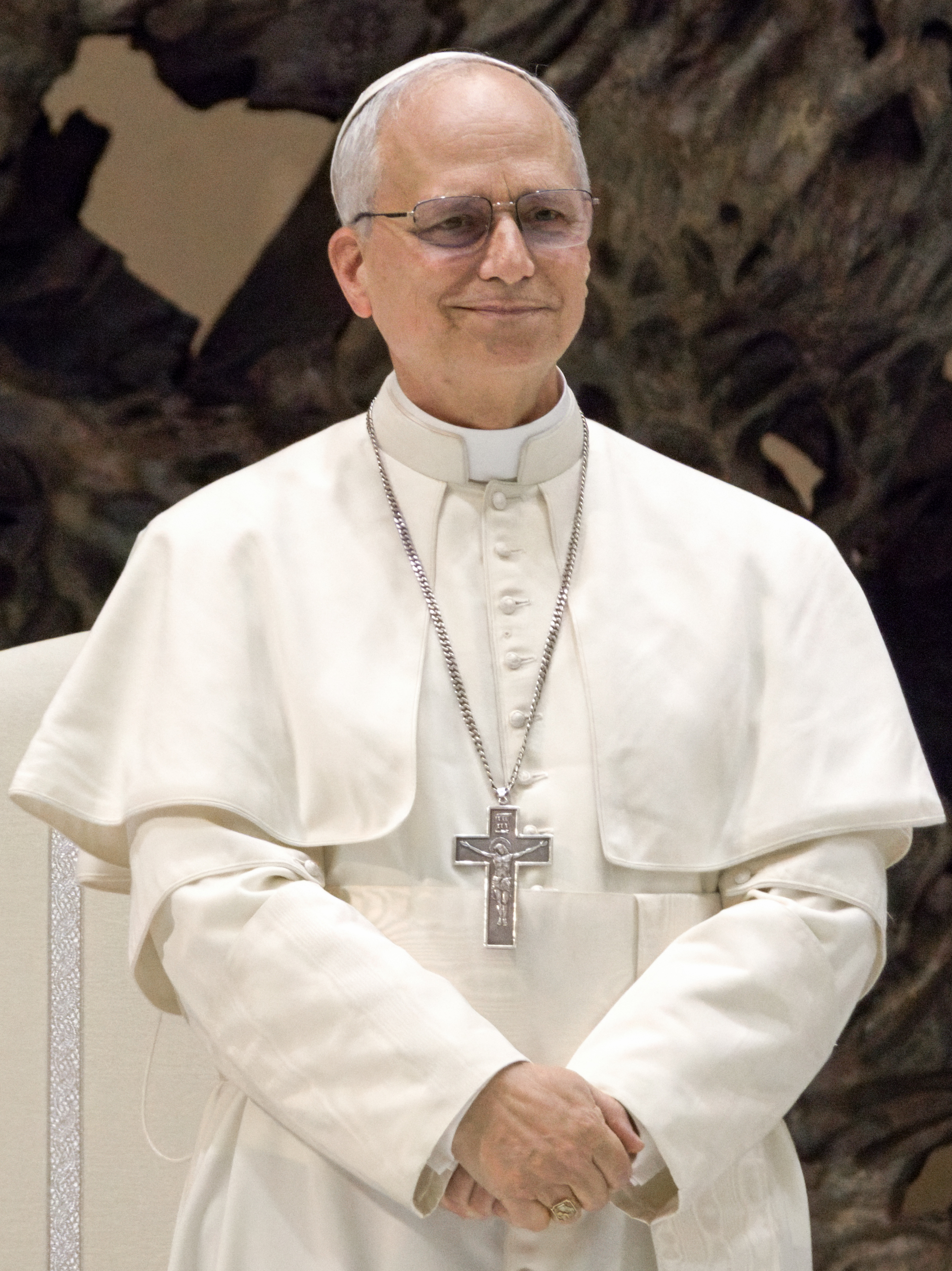
Pope Leo XIV, Sovereign of the Vatican City State

In an elective monarchy, monarchs are elected or appointed by somebody (an electoral college) for life or a defined period, but then reign like any other monarch. There is no popular vote involved in elective monarchies, as the elective body usually consists of a small number of eligible people. Historical examples of elective monarchy are the Holy Roman Emperors (chosen by prince-electors but often coming from the same dynasty) and the free election of kings of the Polish–Lithuanian Commonwealth. For example, Pepin the Short (father of Charlemagne) was elected King of the Franks by an assembly of Frankish leading men; nobleman Stanisław August Poniatowski of Poland was an elected king, as was Frederick I of Denmark. Gallic and Germanic peoples also had elective monarchies.

The Pope of the Roman Catholic Church (who rules as Sovereign of the Vatican City State) is elected for life by the College of Cardinals. In the Sovereign Military Order of Malta, the Prince and Grand Master is elected for life tenure by the Council Complete of State from within its members. In Malaysia, the federal king, called the Yang di-Pertuan Agong or Paramount Ruler, is elected for a five-year term from among and by the hereditary rulers (mostly sultans) of nine of the federation's constitutive states, all on the Malay peninsula. The United Arab Emirates also chooses its federal leaders from among emirs of the federated states. Furthermore, Andorra has a unique constitutional arrangement as one of its heads of state is the President of the French Republic in the form of a Co-Prince.

=== Usurpation ===
Another way monarchs have historically gained royal power is by seizing it, either by force or other illegitimate measures. Historically usurpation has usually happened via a coup or by fraudulently claiming be a descendant of a ruler that they may or may not be related to. According to Herodotus, this was done by someone impersonating Smerdis in order to seize the throne of Cyrus the Great after his death.

== Current monarchies ==
World's states colored by systems of government: Parliamentary systems: Head of government is elected or nominated by and accountable to the legislature. Constitutional monarchy with a ceremonial monarch Semi-constitutional monarchy: Monarch holds significant executive or legislative power but is still restricted by the constitution. Parliamentary republic with a ceremonial president Parliamentary republic with an executive president Presidential system: Head of government (president) is popularly elected and independent of the legislature. Presidential republic Theocratic presidential republic: Supreme leader is highest authority; popularly elected president still exists. Hybrid systems: Semi-presidential republic: Executive president is independent of the legislature; head of government is appointed by the president and is accountable to the legislature. Assembly-independent republic: Head of government (president or directory) is elected by the legislature, but is not accountable to it. Other systems: Islamic theocracy: Supreme leader holds unlimited political and religious power; state and faith are a single institution. Absolute monarchy: Monarch has unlimited power. One-party state: Power is constitutionally linked to a single political party. Provisional government: Current regime is temporary or transitional; no permanent constitution. Military junta: Committee of military leaders controls the government; constitutional provisions are suspended. Places without governments. Note: this chart represents the de jure systems of government, not the de facto degree of democracy.

Currently, there are several countries in the world with a monarch as head of state. They fall roughly into the following categories:

=== Commonwealth realms ===
King Charles III is, separately, monarch of fifteen Commonwealth realms (Antigua and Barbuda, the Commonwealth of Australia, the Commonwealth of the Bahamas, Belize, Canada, Grenada, Jamaica, New Zealand, the Independent State of Papua New Guinea, the Federation of Saint Christopher and Nevis, Saint Lucia, Saint Vincent and the Grenadines, the Solomon Islands, Tuvalu and the United Kingdom of Great Britain and Northern Ireland). They evolved out of the British Empire into fully independent states within the Commonwealth of Nations that retain the King as head of state.

=== Other European constitutional monarchies ===
The Principality of Andorra, the Kingdom of Belgium, the Kingdom of Denmark, the Grand Duchy of Luxembourg, the Kingdom of the Netherlands, the Kingdom of Norway, the Kingdom of Spain, and the Kingdom of Sweden are fully democratic states in which the monarch has a limited or largely ceremonial role.

Andorra is unique among all existing monarchies, as it is a diarchy, with the co-princes being shared by the president of France and the bishop of Urgell.

=== European semi-constitutional monarchies ===
A semi-constitutional monarchy is a monarchy where the monarch rules according to a democratic constitution but still retains substantial powers. The Principality of Liechtenstein and the Principality of Monaco are European semi-constitutional monarchies. For example, the 2003 Constitution referendum gave the Prince of Liechtenstein the power to veto any law that the Landtag (parliament) proposes, while the Landtag can veto any law that the Prince tries to pass. The prince can appoint or dismiss any elective member or government employee. The prince of Monaco has simpler powers; he cannot appoint or dismiss any elective member or government employee to or from his or her post, but he can elect the minister of state, government council and judges.

=== Monarchies in the Muslim world ===
The monarchies of the Kingdom of Bahrain, the Brunei Darussalam, the Hashemite Kingdom of Jordan, the State of Kuwait, Malaysia, the Kingdom of Morocco, the Sultanate of Oman, the State of Qatar, the Kingdom of Saudi Arabia, and the United Arab Emirates generally retain far more powers than their European or Commonwealth counterparts. Brunei, Oman, and Saudi Arabia are absolute monarchies; Bahrain, Kuwait, Qatar and United Arab Emirates are classified as mixed, meaning there are representative bodies but the monarch retains most of his powers. Jordan, Malaysia, and Morocco are constitutional monarchies.

=== East and Southeast Asian constitutional monarchies ===
The Kingdom of Bhutan, the Kingdom of Cambodia, the Kingdom of Thailand, and Japan are constitutional monarchies where the monarch has a limited or merely ceremonial role. Bhutan made the change in 2008. Cambodia had its own monarchy after independence from the French colonial empire, but it was deposed after the Khmer Rouge came into power. The monarchy was subsequently restored in the peace agreement of 1993. Thailand transitioned into a constitutional monarchy over the course of the 20th century. Japan has had a monarchy, an emperor, according to legend, since Emperor Jimmu (reigned 660–585 BCE), making it the world's oldest existing monarchy. After their defeat in the Second World War, Japan was forced into limiting the power of the Emperor, giving almost all of it to the National Diet.

=== Other monarchies ===
Eswatini is unique among these monarchies, often being considered a diarchy: the King, or Ngwenyama, rules alongside his mother, the Ndlovukati, as dual heads of state. This was originally intended to provide a check on political power. The Ngwenyama, however, is considered the administrative head of state, while the Ndlovukati is considered the spiritual and national head of state, a position which more or less has become symbolic in recent years.

The Pope is the absolute monarch of the Vatican City State (a separate entity from the Holy See) by virtue of his position as head of the Roman Catholic Church and Bishop of Rome; he is an elected rather than a hereditary ruler, and does not have to be a citizen of the territory prior to his election by the cardinals.

In Samoa, the position of head of state is described in Part III of the 1960 Samoan constitution. At the time the constitution was adopted, it was anticipated that future heads of state would be chosen from among the four Tama a 'Aiga "royal" paramount chiefs. However, this is not required by the constitution, and, for this reason, Samoa can be considered a parliamentary republic rather than a constitutional monarchy. However, each member of the Samoan parliament, except for the two seats reserved for non-Samoans, must be a matai, a member of the hereditary political system known as the Faʻamatai.

The ruling Kim family in North Korea (Kim Il Sung, Kim Jong Il and Kim Jong Un) has been described as a de facto absolute monarchy or a "hereditary dictatorship". In 2013, Clause 2 of Article 10 of the new edited Ten Fundamental Principles of the Korean Workers' Party states that the party and revolution must be carried "eternally" by the "Baekdu (Kim's) bloodline". This though does not mean it is a de jure absolute monarchy, as the country's official name is the Democratic People's Republic of Korea. The al-Assad family, which ruled Syria from 1971 to 2024, was similarly categorised as such.

== See also ==
- Absolute monarchy
- Abolition of monarchy
- Autocracy
- Criticism of monarchy
- Diarchy
- Empire
- Federal monarchy
- Hereditary monarchy
- List of current monarchies
- List of current monarchs of sovereign states
- List of current non-sovereign monarchs
- List of fictional monarchs
- List of monarchies
- List of monarchs by nickname
- List of usurpers
- Monarchism
- Order of succession
- Pretender
- Royal family
- Royal and noble ranks
- Universal monarchy
