= Dominion of Melchizedek =

Micronation

- Unrecognized micronation
- Claimed by: Mark Pedley
- Dates claimed: 1990 - present
- Area claimed: Various real and fictional locations in Pacific Ocean and Antarctica
- Type: Active

The Dominion of Melchizedek (DoM) is a micronation known for facilitating large scale banking fraud in many parts of the world during the 1990s and early 2000s.

== Origin and status ==
The Dominion of Melchizedek was unilaterally declared in 1990 by U.S. citizen Mark Pedley, possibly with his father, David Pedley. Mark Pedley also uses a number of pseudonyms, including "Tzemach Ben David Netzer Korem" and "Branch Vinedresser". It borrows its name from the biblical king and priest Melchizedek.

When created, the DoM first laid claim to the Colombian island of Malpelo, a small island 300 miles off the Pacific coast of Colombia. Later, it invented the Karitane Shoal in the South Pacific, which is supposedly completely submerged for part of the day; Clipperton Island, an overseas possession of France which lies 1,500 miles west of Nicaragua; and Taongi, otherwise known as Bokak Atoll, an uninhabited Micronesian atoll falling under the administration of the Government of the Marshall Islands. Representatives of the DoM were banned from entering the island of Rotuma after their involvement with dissident groups seeking to secede from Fiji, with whom they had signed agreements to lease land on the islands of Rotuma and its neighbour Solkope. It also claims the portion of Antarctica unclaimed by sovereign states, from 90 degrees to 150 degrees west, known as Marie Byrd Land.

It has been described as "non-existent" by the U.S. Securities and Exchange Commission, and as a "non-recognised sovereignty" by the U.S. Office of the Comptroller of the Currency. It appears on an EU list of fantasy passports issued by private individuals or organisations. Media reports have described it as a "virtual country", as a "ruse", and as a "phony country".

=== Marshall Islands statement ===
In response to one of DoM's territorial claims, the government of the Republic of the Marshall Islands issued the following statement in April 1998:

The Government of the Republic of the Marshall Islands condemns the claims and activities asserted by representatives of the "Kingdom of EnenKio" and the "Dominion of Melchizedek". The representatives making claims of separate sovereignty are not citizens of the Republic of the Marshall Islands and have no right to make claims on behalf of Marshallese landowners. Furthermore, these representatives are making fraudulent assertions that violate the Republic of the Marshall Islands's constitution. The area of land and ocean which the "Kingdom of EnenKio" asserts as a sovereign nation separate from the Marshall Islands and the area of land and ocean which the "Dominion of Melchizedek" is asserting control over are areas within the geographical and political boundaries of the Republic of the Marshall Islands.

— Ministry of Foreign Affairs, Republic of the Marshall Islands, Circular Note 01-98

=== Claims of recognition ===
On the DoM's official website, they claim a number of nations have recognized their sovereignty, with links to supporting documents. Upon closer examination, a number of these are merely correspondence acknowledging various requests made of these established states, or appear to be responses to offers of financial support. Of the entire list, only one appeared to be an actual verifiable recognition – a letter signed by President André Kolingba from the Central African Republic recognising it as "an Ecclesiastical Sovereignty". According to The Washington Post, the Central African Republic extended diplomatic recognition to the DoM in 1993, but the Post article went on to remark, "you get the feeling that the Central African Republic would recognize the State of Denial if it had a letterhead." An article in the Quatloos!, online anti-fraud site, noted that "Melchizedek has apparently obtained some sort of recognition from some smaller states ... all of which are notable for their corruption. Claims that the DoM has received recognition from any major government are purely lies." It is notable that the DoM's claimed documents of recognition have not been proven legitimate by their supposed countries of origin.

== Frauds linked to the Dominion of Melchizedek ==
Soon after its inception, the DoM started selling documents purporting to charter or licence companies. By the end of the 1990s, the DoM claimed that some 300 banking licenses had been sold. DoM apologists have suggested that there is no link between Melchizedek and the illegal activities conducted by "banks" it has "licensed"; however, John Shockey, a former special assistant in the office of the U.S. Comptroller of the Currency, has stated:

Melchizedek first came to my attention in June 1990, a few months after Mark Pedley was paroled from a 1986 conviction. Inquiries were received concerning bank names: Banco de Asia, Guardian Savings & Guaranty and Express Bank among others. Investigations that these entities had bank charters from the DOM and obtained through an entity named Consortium Finance Corporation headquartered in Lake Tahoe, California. Further investigation disclosed a principal alternately named John Hayden and Branch Vinedresser. Shortly thereafter the FBI took Branch Vinedresser into custody and revealed that he was Mark Pedley, who then was charged with violations of his parole.

In the same address Stockey also stated that: "The Dominion of Melchizedek is a fraud, a major fraud, and not a legitimate sovereign entity. Persons associated with the Dominion of Melchizedek have been indicted and convicted of a variety of crimes."

In 1991, in Washington, D.C, shell banks that were subsidiaries of a Melchizedekian company tried to secure loans from real banks based on fake DoM securities, but were closed down before they succeeded. One of the men involved, Steve Peterson, later pleaded guilty to fraud and theft charges in another case in Arizona after using a company chartered in DoM.

In Hong Kong, Gerhard Bacher used cheques issued by phoney Melchizedek banks to open accounts in legitimate Hong Kong banks; he was sentenced to 6 months in prison. In 1995, in the UK, an organisation that was making use of a DoM licensed bank was barred from doing business.

A so-called "60/40 Investment Programme" offered by Credit Bank International, run by Roger Rosemont and registered in the DoM, was a Ponzi scheme that convinced at least 1,400 people to invest over $4,000,000.

Companies with links to the DoM have been used in insurance fraud schemes. In Texas in 1996, after pleading guilty to insurance fraud, Jeffrey Reynolds was sentenced to 52 months in prison and ordered to repay $475,802 in premiums he had collected for bogus insurance policies. The companies he was using had been licensed in the DoM. Later in the same year, and also in Texas, Leon Hooten's New Zealand-registered companies were prevented from selling insurance when they were found to be capitalised with worthless assets issued by the DoM.

Businessman Rogério Cavaco Silva, brother of former President of Portugal Aníbal Cavaco Silva, was conned out of US$35,000 in 1996 which was supposed to guarantee a loan to complete a hotel in the Algarve. Six Portuguese perpetrators, who conned a total of 39 businesspeople (including Cavaco Silva) between 1996 and 1999, were sentenced in 2007 to several periods in prison, the longest of which was six years.

The DoM has also been involved in selling passports widely regarded as fraudulent, misrepresenting them as internationally recognised. In 1998, three individuals purporting to be officials of the DoM were arrested in the Philippines. The ringleader, John Gillespie, an Australian felon who was involved in the Fine Cotton horse substitution scam, eluded capture. The passport scam grossed an estimated US$1,000,000 from hundreds of individuals, with some paying up to $3,500 for these documents.

Across all the purported schemes DoM has been accused of involvement in, one source estimates that the total value of funds raised may exceed US$500 million.

== Principal figures ==
=== David Evan Pedley ===
After being convicted of several financial crimes in the 1970s, including stock fraud, David Pedley was incarcerated. He claimed the charges were false and the result of a "witch-hunt" against him. While incarcerated, he started a cattle business, which his son Mark operated for him in Los Angeles, California.

While in Mexican custody Pedley apparently died, though the circumstances are not clear. A closed casket funeral was held in Altadena, California in 1987. At the funeral, FBI agents approached the Pedley family and requested to fingerprint David Pedley's body. This request was denied by the family and allegedly some government regulators believed that Pedley was still alive.

Pedley is the co-author, with his son, of the Melchizedek Bible.

=== Mark Logan Pedley ===
Mark Logan Pedley (born 19 July 1953), later changed to Mark Wellington and also known as "Tzemach Ben David Netzer Korem" and "Branch Vinedresser" (a translation of his Hebrew name Tzemach Korem), is the son of David Pedley and was the Head of the House of Elders, Vice President, and Chief Justice of the Supreme Court of the DoM. Pedley is the co-author, with his father, of the Melchizedek Bible.

In 1983, Pedley was convicted of mail and interstate fraud relating to a land fraud in California and jailed for three years. Shortly after his release, he was again successfully prosecuted in 1986 for a $6 million currency fraud scheme that was operated in 1982–83; he was jailed for eight years and fined $25,000. Having been paroled in 1990, he set up the Dominion of Melchizedek. His parole was revoked in late 1991 due to a violation of his conditions, arising from his promotion of a fictitious country, and was returned to prison to serve the remainder of his sentence. In 1994, following his release, Pedley married Pearlasia Gamboa, who was made president of Melchizedek.

In 2010, under the name Tzemach David Netzer Korem, he was charged with, and later pleaded guilty to, share manipulation regarding ZNext Mining. ZNext Mining was investigated by a multi-agency taskforce as part of Operation Broken Trust, a US-wide operation in 2010 that targeted investment fraud. In 2011 he was sentenced to two years in prison; he was released in 2012.

=== Pearlasia Gamboa ===
Pearlasia Gamboa was president of the Dominion of Melchizedek. She is married to Mark Pedley.

She is a Filipino-American businesswoman who has been involved in controversial banking and investments. She was prevented from operating companies that were purporting to be banks in Indiana and California. The U.S. Securities and Exchange Commission sued Gamboa in 2009, alleging that she had used fictitious reports of gold mining operations to profit by fraudulently selling shares, siphoning off more than $1 million. A judgment was ordered against her in August 2010 totaling $1.8 million; a $650,000 fine for the ZNext corporation, and $1.18 million for Gamboa personally. Gamboa was also permanently barred from selling penny stocks. As of 2011 she had still not paid the fine and was attempting to have the decision overturned.

== See also ==
- List of micronations
- Joseon Cybernation, the first micronation that had been recognized verifiably by a UN member state
