= Kingdom of EnenKio =

Unrecognized micronation in Oceania

Flag of the Kingdom of EnenKio

The Kingdom of EnenKio is a claimed micronation near the Marshall Islands run by Robert Moore.

== Background ==
The Republic of the Marshall Islands has claimed Wake Island, which it calls "Ānen Kio" ("Enen-Kio" in older Marshallese orthography). In 1973, Marshallese lawmakers meeting in Saipan at the Congress of Micronesia, the legislative body for the Trust Territory of the Pacific Islands, asserted that "Enen-Kio is and always has been the property of the people of the Marshall Islands." Their claim was based on oral legends and songs as there was never an indigenous population on Wake Island. "EnenKio" means "Island of the orange flower" and comes from the Kio flower that is native to the island. The island has been controlled and administered by the United States since 1899.

== Claimed micronation ==
In 1994 Honolulu resident Robert Moore, claiming to act on behalf of Iroijlaplap Murjel Hermios, issued a statement that “the US has been given the boot out of Wake Island” and that Hermio had been restored to his "native rights" as the sovereign of an independent nation.

This self-declared "Kingdom of EnenKio" issued passports. The Kingdom of EnenKio is not recognized in any international forum as a sovereign state, nor does any internationally recognized state recognize it. In 1997 the Dominion of Melchizedek, a micronation engaged in financial fraud, reported that the two had entered into relations. The Kingdom of EnenKio is characterized as a scam by anti-fraud website Quatloos!

Moore was prevented by the U.S. Securities and Exchange Commission from fraudulently issuing ~1 billion USD in "Enenkio Gold War bonds" on his website for the non-existent nation and was charged with violating Sections 5(c), 17(a)(1), and 17(a)(3) of the Securities Act of 1933.

On 23 April 1998 the Marshall Islands government issued Circular Note 01-98, which vigorously denied the Kingdom of EnenKio and the Dominion of Melchizedek's claims, stating:

The Government of the Republic of the Marshall Islands condemns the claims and activities asserted by representatives of the "Kingdom of EnenKio" and the "Dominion of Melchizedek". The representatives making claims of separate sovereignty are not citizens of the Republic of the Marshall Islands and have no right to make claims on behalf of Marshallese landowners. Furthermore, these representatives are making fraudulent assertions that violate the Republic of the Marshall Islands' constitution. The area of land and ocean which the "Kingdom of EnenKio" asserts as a sovereign nation separate from the Marshall Islands and the area of land and ocean which the "Dominion of Melchizedek" is asserting control over are areas within the geographical and political boundaries of the Republic of the Marshall Islands.

The Government of the Republic of the Marshall Islands discourages all independent sovereign nations having diplomatic relations with the Republic from acknowledging any fraudulent claims made by representatives of the "Kingdom of EnenKio" and the "Dominion of Melchizedek".

— Ministry of Foreign Affairs, Republic of the Marshall Islands

== See also ==
- List of micronations
- Wake Island
