= Pearlasia Gamboa =

Filipino-American businesswoman

- Born: Elvira G. Gamboa; 1951 (age 73–74); Manila, the Philippines
- Occupation: Businesswoman
- Spouse(s): Rocky Austin (bf. 1993), Mark Logan Pedley (1994-present)
- Children: 3

Pearlasia Gamboa (born Elvira G. Gamboa) is a Filipino American business woman involved in controversial banking and investments, for which she has been successfully sued by the U.S. Securities and Exchange Commission and various state agencies. She was connected to the Dominion of Melchizedek, an unrecognized micronation that has been used as a front for fraudulent criminal activity.

== Personal life ==
Gamboa was born Elvira G. Gamboa, in 1951,^{a} in Manila. She was married to Rocky Austin, but later divorced prior to 1993 and as of 2011 lived in California. In 1994, she married Mark Logan Pedley, although there is some question as to whether this was legally registered. She has a daughter, Bernadette, and a son, Raymond, from her first marriage and she has a son, Hazemach, from her second.

== Career ==
In 1994 companies run by Gamboa, and which were purporting to be banks, were prevented from operating in Indiana and California.

=== Banking micronation ===
Gamboa was the president of the micronation known as the Dominion of Melchizedek, set up by her husband Mark Pedley. The micronation, which only exists in cyberspace, is a front for fraudulent criminal activity.

=== ZNext Mining ===
The U.S. Securities and Exchange Commission took her to civil court over a company she owned, ZNext Mining, in 2009, alleging that she had used fictitious reports of gold mining operations to profit by fraudulently selling shares, siphoning off more than $1 million. She maintained that any fraudulent manipulation of stock prices was carried out by her husband without her knowledge. After Gamboa failed to appear in federal court to contest the government's accusations, a default judgment was ordered against her in August 2010 totaling $1.8 million; a $650,000 fine for the ZNext corporation, and $1.18 million for Gamboa personally. Gamboa was also permanently barred from selling penny stocks. In 2011, she said she had not paid the fine and was attempting to have the decision overturned.

ZNext Mining was investigated by a multi-agency taskforce as part of Operation Broken Trust, a US-wide operation in 2010 that targeted investment fraud. Although her husband Mark Pedley was charged, under the name Tzemach David Netzer Korem, and pleaded guilty, Gamboa was not.

=== Use of aliases ===
Gamboa has operated under various pseudonyms, including Pearl Asian and Bae Katiguman, and Pearlasia.

== Notes ==
^a Gamboa's age was reported as 57 on 15 June 2009 and as 60 on 6 July 2011, which would mean she was born in 1951.
