= List of current reigning monarchs by length of reign =

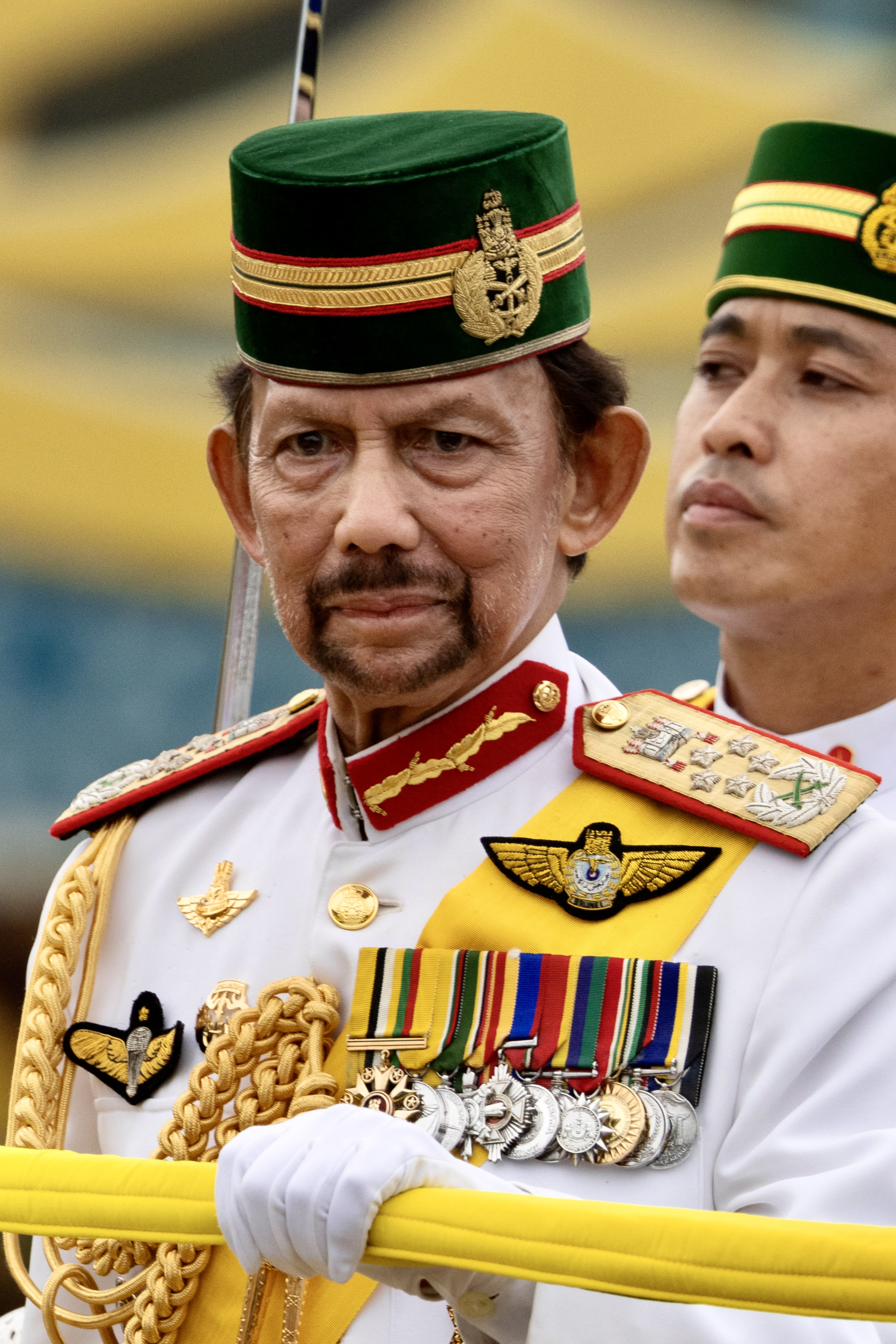
Hassanal Bolkiah, the longest-reigning existing monarch

This is a list of reigning monarchs sorted by length of service.

This list includes monarchs who do not reign over entire nations, such as Muhammad V of Kelantan, but does not include pretenders, such as Simeon II of Bulgaria; monarchs without physical territories such as the Prince and Grand Master of the Sovereign Military Order of Malta; constituent monarchs such as traditional African rulers; or monarchs whose position is unofficial, such as Tenzin Gyatso, 14th Dalai Lama.

Hassanal Bolkiah is the longest-reigning existing monarch, having been Sultan of Brunei since 5 October 1967. He became the longest-reigning monarch upon the death of Elizabeth II of the United Kingdom on 8 September 2022. Ntfombi, Queen Mother of Eswatini is the only female monarch in the world.

== List ==
Rank	Monarch	State	Country	Born	Current age	Acceded	Years reigned
Reigns as of 29 September 2026 T 15:53 (UTC)
1	Hassanal Bolkiah	Brunei		15 July 1946	80 years, 76 days	5 October 1967	58 years, 359 days
2	Sultan bin Mohamed Al-Qassimi III	Sharjah	United Arab Emirates	2 July 1939	87 years, 89 days	25 January 1972	54 years, 247 days
3	Carl XVI Gustaf	Sweden		30 April 1946	80 years, 152 days	15 September 1973	53 years, 14 days
4	Hamad bin Mohammed Al Sharqi	Fujairah	United Arab Emirates	22 February 1949	77 years, 219 days	18 September 1974	52 years, 11 days
5	Humaid bin Rashid Al Nuaimi III	Ajman	United Arab Emirates	1 January 1931	95 years, 271 days	6 September 1981	45 years, 23 days
6	Ntfombi	Eswatini (Note: The monarchy of Eswatini is a diarchy jointly headed by the Ngwenyama and the Ndlovukati.)		27 December 1949	76 years, 276 days	10 August 1983	43 years, 50 days
7	Mswati III	Eswatini		19 April 1968	58 years, 163 days	25 April 1986	40 years, 157 days
8	Hamengkubuwono X	Yogyakarta	Indonesia	2 April 1946	80 years, 180 days	7 March 1989	37 years, 206 days
9	Hans-Adam II	Liechtenstein		14 February 1945	81 years, 227 days	13 November 1989	36 years, 320 days
10	Letsie III	Lesotho		17 July 1963	63 years, 74 days	7 February 1996 (Note: Letsie III first reigned during 12 November 1990 – 25 January 1995, was deposed, then returned to the throne on 7 February 1996. Length-of-reign calculation includes both tenures.)	34 years, 305 days
11	Mizan Zainal Abidin	Terengganu	Malaysia	22 January 1962	64 years, 250 days	15 May 1998	28 years, 137 days
12	Abdullah II	Jordan		30 January 1962	64 years, 242 days	7 February 1999	27 years, 234 days
13	Hamad bin Isa Al Khalifa	Bahrain		28 January 1950	76 years, 244 days	6 March 1999	27 years, 207 days
14	Mohammed VI	Morocco		21 August 1963	63 years, 39 days	23 July 1999	27 years, 68 days
15	Syed Sirajuddin	Perlis	Malaysia	17 May 1943	83 years, 135 days	17 April 2000	26 years, 165 days
16	Sharafuddin Idris Shah	Selangor	Malaysia	24 December 1945	80 years, 279 days	22 November 2001	24 years, 311 days
17	Norodom Sihamoni	Cambodia		14 May 1953	73 years, 138 days	14 October 2004	21 years, 350 days
18	Albert II	Monaco		14 March 1958	68 years, 199 days	6 April 2005	21 years, 176 days
19	Mohammed bin Rashid Al Maktoum	Dubai	United Arab Emirates	15 July 1949	77 years, 76 days	4 January 2006	20 years, 268 days
20	Jigme Khesar Namgyel Wangchuck	Bhutan		21 February 1980	46 years, 220 days	9 December 2006	19 years, 294 days
21	Muhriz	Negeri Sembilan	Malaysia	14 January 1948	78 years, 258 days	29 December 2008	17 years, 274 days
22	Saud bin Rashid Al Mualla	Umm al-Quwain	United Arab Emirates	1 October 1952	73 years, 363 days	2 January 2009	17 years, 270 days
23	Ibrahim Iskandar	Johor	Malaysia (Note: Ibrahim Iskandar is also the currently-reigning Yang di-Pertuan Agong, and has reigned for 2 years, 241 days (since 31 January 2024).)	22 November 1958	67 years, 311 days	23 January 2010	16 years, 249 days
24	Muhammad V	Kelantan	Malaysia	6 October 1969	56 years, 358 days	13 September 2010	16 years, 16 days
25	Saud bin Saqr Al Qasimi	Ras al-Khaimah	United Arab Emirates	10 February 1956	70 years, 231 days	27 October 2010	15 years, 337 days
26	Tupou VI	Tonga		12 July 1959	67 years, 79 days	18 March 2012	14 years, 195 days
27	Willem-Alexander	Netherlands		27 April 1967	59 years, 155 days	30 April 2013	13 years, 152 days
28	Tamim bin Hamad Al Thani	Qatar		3 June 1980	46 years, 118 days	25 June 2013	13 years, 96 days
29	Philippe	Belgium		15 April 1960	66 years, 167 days	21 July 2013	13 years, 70 days
30	Nazrin Muizzuddin Shah	Perak	Malaysia	27 November 1956	69 years, 306 days	29 May 2014	12 years, 123 days
31	Felipe VI	Spain		30 January 1968	58 years, 242 days	19 June 2014	12 years, 102 days
32	Salman bin Abdulaziz Al Saud	Saudi Arabia		31 December 1935	90 years, 272 days	23 January 2015	11 years, 249 days
33	Paku Alam X	Pakualaman	Indonesia	15 December 1962	63 years, 288 days	1 July 2016	10 years, 90 days
34	Vajiralongkorn (Rama X)	Thailand		28 July 1952	74 years, 63 days	13 October 2016	9 years, 351 days
35	Emmanuel Macron	Andorra		21 December 1977	48 years, 282 days	14 May 2017	9 years, 138 days
36	Mahmud Sallehuddin	Kedah	Malaysia	30 April 1942	84 years, 152 days	11 September 2017	9 years, 18 days
37	Abdullah Sultan Ahmad Shah	Pahang	Malaysia	30 July 1959	67 years, 61 days	15 January 2019	7 years, 257 days
38	Naruhito	Japan		23 February 1960	66 years, 218 days	1 May 2019	7 years, 151 days
39	Haitham bin Tariq Al Said	Oman		11 October 1954	71 years, 353 days	11 January 2020	6 years, 261 days
40	Mohamed bin Zayed Al Nahyan	Abu Dhabi	United Arab Emirates	11 March 1961	65 years, 202 days	13 May 2022	4 years, 139 days
41	Charles III	Antigua and Barbuda		14 November 1948	77 years, 319 days	8 September 2022	4 years, 21 days
41	Charles III	Australia		14 November 1948	77 years, 319 days	8 September 2022	4 years, 21 days
41	Charles III	The Bahamas		14 November 1948	77 years, 319 days	8 September 2022	4 years, 21 days
41	Charles III	Belize		14 November 1948	77 years, 319 days	8 September 2022	4 years, 21 days
41	Charles III	Canada		14 November 1948	77 years, 319 days	8 September 2022	4 years, 21 days
41	Charles III	Grenada		14 November 1948	77 years, 319 days	8 September 2022	4 years, 21 days
41	Charles III	Jamaica		14 November 1948	77 years, 319 days	8 September 2022	4 years, 21 days
41	Charles III	New Zealand		14 November 1948	77 years, 319 days	8 September 2022	4 years, 21 days
41	Charles III	Papua New Guinea		14 November 1948	77 years, 319 days	8 September 2022	4 years, 21 days
41	Charles III	Saint Kitts and Nevis		14 November 1948	77 years, 319 days	8 September 2022	4 years, 21 days
41	Charles III	Saint Lucia		14 November 1948	77 years, 319 days	8 September 2022	4 years, 21 days
41	Charles III	Saint Vincent and the Grenadines		14 November 1948	77 years, 319 days	8 September 2022	4 years, 21 days
41	Charles III	Solomon Islands		14 November 1948	77 years, 319 days	8 September 2022	4 years, 21 days
41	Charles III	Tuvalu		14 November 1948	77 years, 319 days	8 September 2022	4 years, 21 days
41	Charles III	United Kingdom		14 November 1948	77 years, 319 days	8 September 2022	4 years, 21 days
42	Mishal Al-Ahmad Al-Jaber Al-Sabah	Kuwait		27 September 1940	86 years, 2 days	16 December 2023	2 years, 287 days
43	Frederik X	Denmark		26 May 1968	58 years, 126 days	14 January 2024	2 years, 258 days
44	Leo XIV	Vatican City		14 September 1955	71 years, 15 days	8 May 2025	1 year, 144 days
45	Josep-Lluís Serrano Pentinat	Andorra		19 March 1977	49 years, 194 days	31 May 2025	1 year, 121 days
46	Guillaume V	Luxembourg		11 November 1981	44 years, 322 days	3 October 2025	361 days
47	Haakon VIII	Norway		20 July 1973	53 years, 71 days	28 August 2026	32 days

== See also ==
- List of current monarchs of sovereign states
- List of current non-sovereign monarchs
- List of current heads of state and government
- List of current state leaders by date of assumption of office
- List of longest-reigning monarchs
- List of shortest-reigning monarchs
- List of state leaders by age
