= List of current monarchs of sovereign states =

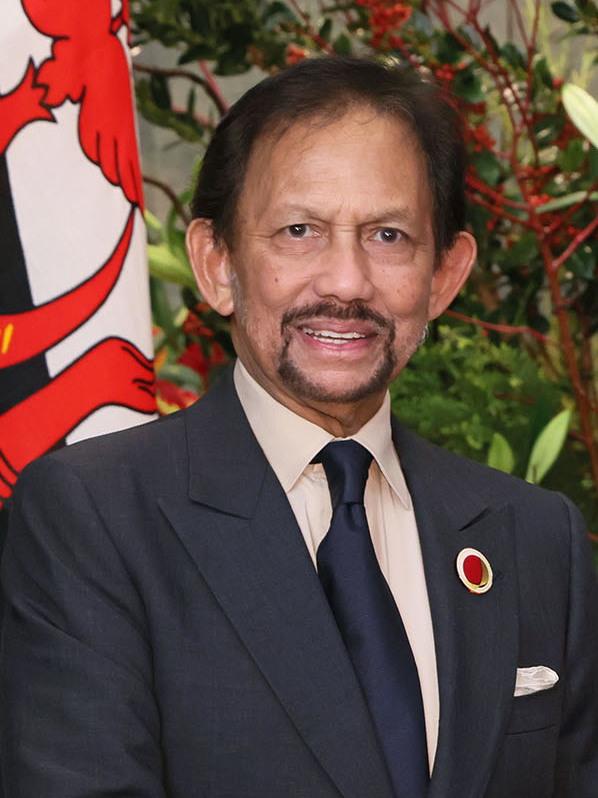
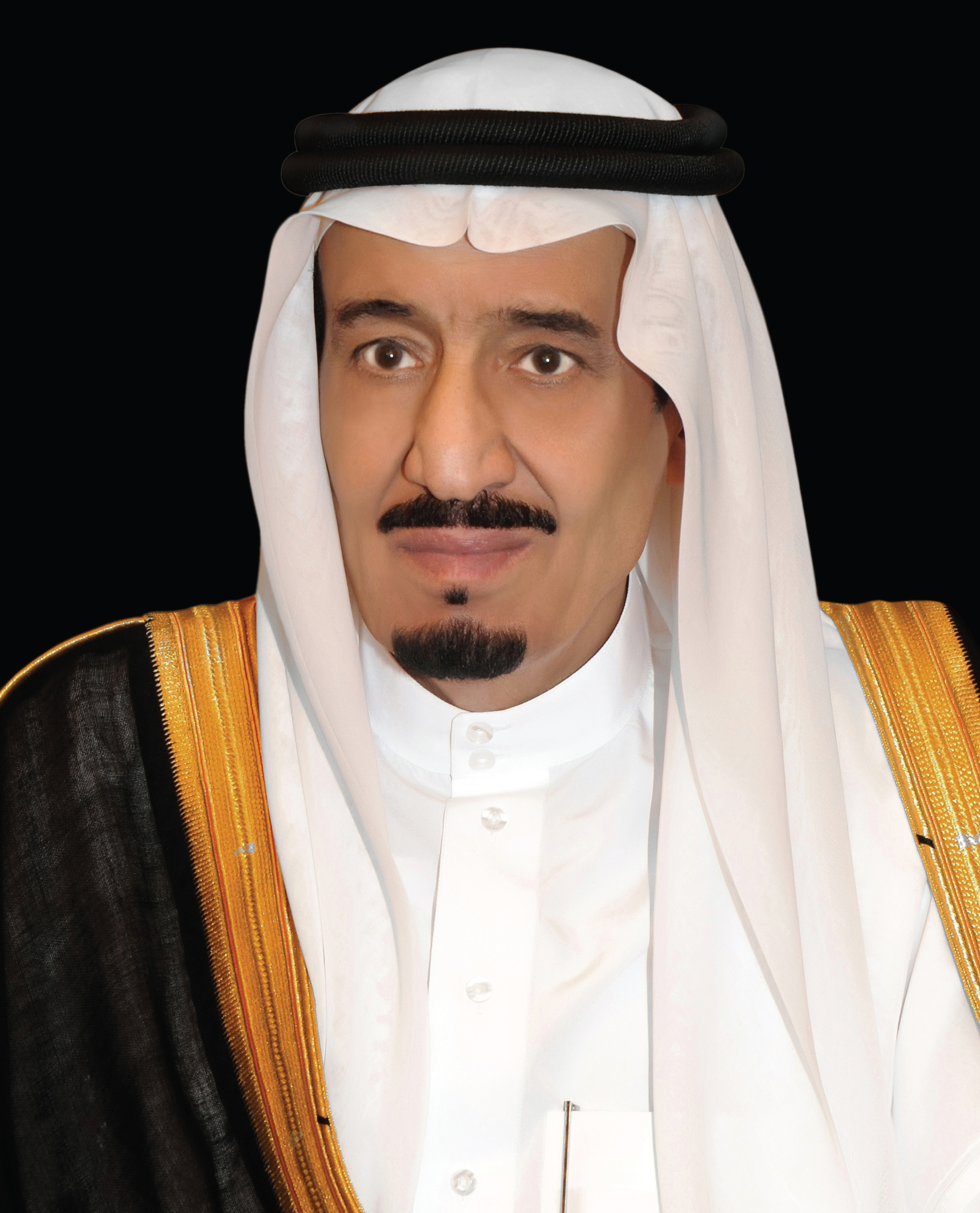
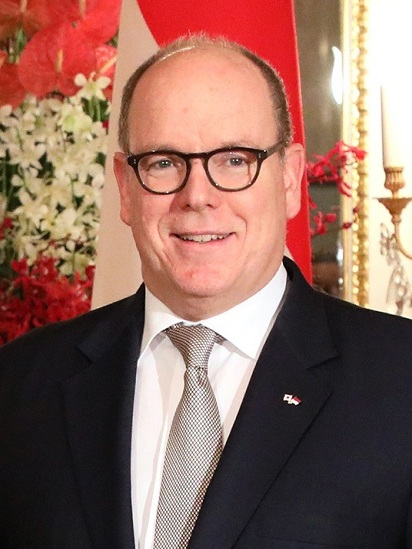
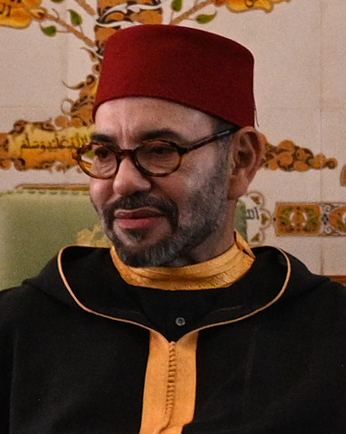
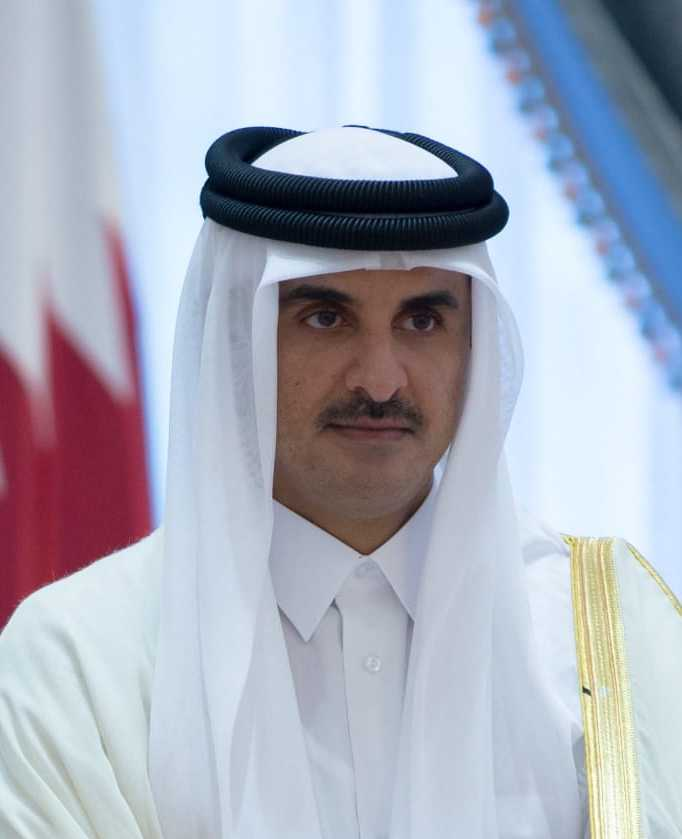
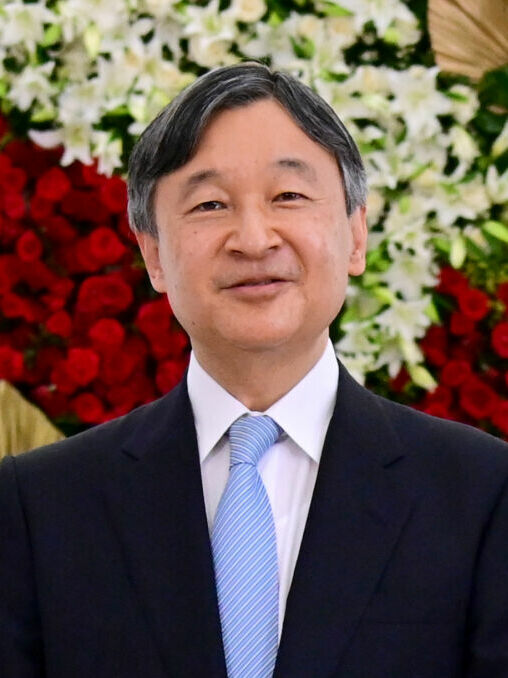
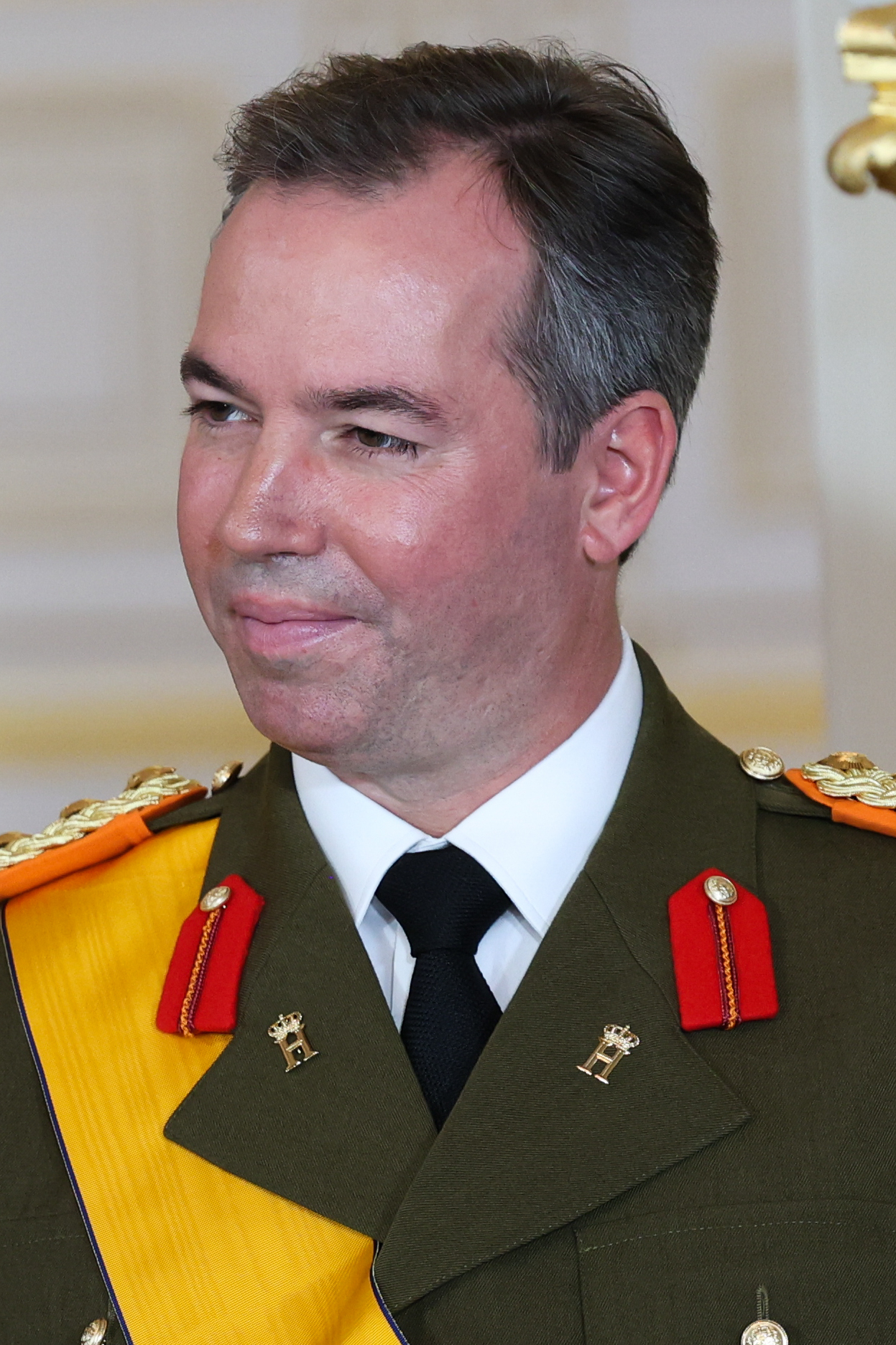
Monarchs of various countries:
- Examples of absolute monarchs (top row):
  - Hassanal Bolkiah, Sultan of Brunei
  - Salman, King of Saudi Arabia
  - Haitham bin Tariq, Sultan of Oman
- Examples of executive monarchs (middle row):
  - Albert II, Prince of Monaco
  - Mohammed VI, King of Morocco
  - Tamim bin Hamad Al Thani, Emir of Qatar
- Examples of ceremonial monarchs (bottom row):
  - Charles III, King of the United Kingdom and the other Commonwealth realms
  - Naruhito, Emperor of Japan
  - Guillaume V, Grand Duke of Luxembourg

A monarch is the head of a monarchy, a form of government in which a state is ruled by an individual who normally rules for life or until abdication, and typically inherits the throne by birth. Monarchs may be autocrats (as in all absolute monarchies) or may be ceremonial figureheads, exercising only limited or no reserve powers at all, with actual authority vested in a legislature and/or executive cabinet (as in many constitutional monarchies). In many cases, a monarch will also be linked with a state religion. Most states only have a single monarch at any given time, although a regent may rule when the monarch is a minor, not present, or otherwise incapable of ruling. Cases in which two monarchs rule simultaneously over a single state, as is the current situation in Andorra, are known as coregencies.

A variety of titles are applied in English; for example, "king" and "queen", "prince" and "princess", "grand duke" and "grand duchess", "emperor" and "empress". Although they will be addressed differently in their local languages, the names and titles in the list below have been styled using the common English equivalent. Roman numerals, used to distinguish related rulers with the same name, have been applied where typical.

In political and sociocultural studies, monarchies are normally associated with hereditary rule; most monarchs, in both historical and contemporary contexts, have been born and raised within a royal family. Succession has been defined using a variety of distinct formulae, such as proximity of blood, primogeniture, and agnatic seniority. Some monarchies, however, are not hereditary, and the ruler is instead determined through an elective process; a modern example is the throne of Malaysia. These systems defy the model concept of a monarchy, but are commonly considered as such because they retain certain associative characteristics. Many systems use a combination of hereditary and elective elements, where the election or nomination of a successor is restricted to members of a royal bloodline.

Entries below are listed beside their respective dominions, which are organised alphabetically. These monarchs reign as head of state in their respective sovereign states. Monarchs reigning over a constituent division, cultural or traditional polity are listed under constituent monarchs. For a list of former ruling families or abolished thrones, see: former ruling families.

== Monarchs by country ==
Title	Monarch	Portrait	Arms or emblem	Sovereign state(s)	Since (Length)	House	Type	Heir to the throne	Ref.
Co-Prince (Note: The Bishop of Urgell and the president of France each hold the position of co-prince of Andorra, but there is no personal title attached to the role.)	Josep-Lluís Serrano Pentinat			Andorra	31 May 2025 (1 year, 171 days)	—N/a	Ceremonial	Ex officio	
Co-Prince	Emmanuel Macron			Andorra	14 May 2017 (9 years, 188 days)	—N/a	Ceremonial	Ex officio	
King	Charles III (Note: Charles is currently King of the United Kingdom of Great Britain and Northern Ireland and fourteen other Commonwealth realms.)			Antigua and Barbuda	8 September 2022 (Note: Coronation took place 6 May 2023.) (4 years, 71 days)	Windsor (Note: Agnatically a member of the House of Glücksburg, a branch of the House of Oldenburg.)	Ceremonial	William, Prince of Wales	
King	Charles III			Australia	8 September 2022 (4 years, 71 days)	Windsor	Ceremonial	William, Prince of Wales	
King	Charles III			The Bahamas	8 September 2022 (4 years, 71 days)	Windsor	Ceremonial	William, Prince of Wales	
King	Charles III			Belize	8 September 2022 (4 years, 71 days)	Windsor	Ceremonial	William, Prince of Wales	
King	Charles III			Canada	8 September 2022 (4 years, 71 days)	Windsor	Ceremonial	William, Prince of Wales	
King	Charles III			Grenada	8 September 2022 (4 years, 71 days)	Windsor	Ceremonial	William, Prince of Wales	
King	Charles III			Jamaica	8 September 2022 (4 years, 71 days)	Windsor	Ceremonial	William, Prince of Wales	
King	Charles III			New Zealand	8 September 2022 (4 years, 71 days)	Windsor	Ceremonial	William, Prince of Wales	
King	Charles III			Papua New Guinea	8 September 2022 (4 years, 71 days)	Windsor	Ceremonial	William, Prince of Wales	
King	Charles III			Saint Kitts and Nevis	8 September 2022 (4 years, 71 days)	Windsor	Ceremonial	William, Prince of Wales	
King	Charles III			Saint Lucia	8 September 2022 (4 years, 71 days)	Windsor	Ceremonial	William, Prince of Wales	
King	Charles III			Saint Vincent and the Grenadines	8 September 2022 (4 years, 71 days)	Windsor	Ceremonial	William, Prince of Wales	
King	Charles III			Solomon Islands	8 September 2022 (4 years, 71 days)	Windsor	Ceremonial	William, Prince of Wales	
King	Charles III			Tuvalu	8 September 2022 (4 years, 71 days)	Windsor	Ceremonial	William, Prince of Wales	
King	Charles III			United Kingdom	8 September 2022 (4 years, 71 days)	Windsor	Ceremonial	William, Prince of Wales	
King	Hamad bin Isa Al Khalifa			Bahrain	6 March 1999 (Note: Hamad bin Isa reigned as Amir of the State of Bahrain until 14 February 2002, when he assumed the new title of King of Bahrain under a new Constitution.) (27 years, 257 days)	Al Khalifa (Note: A clan of the Utub tribe.)	Executive	Salman, Crown Prince of Bahrain	
King	Philippe			Belgium	21 July 2013 (13 years, 120 days)	Saxe-Coburg and Gotha (Note: The House of Saxe-Coburg and Gotha is a branch of the House of Wettin.)	Ceremonial	Elisabeth, Duchess of Brabant, Princess of Belgium (Note: The Belgian monarch does not automatically assume the throne at the death or abdication of their predecessor; they only become monarch upon taking a constitutional oath.)	
King (Note: Officially the Druk Gyalpo (འབྲུག་རྒྱལ་པོ་; lit. 'Dragon King'))	Jigme Khesar Namgyel Wangchuck			Bhutan	9 December 2006 (Note: Coronation took place 6 November 2008.) (19 years, 344 days)	Wangchuck	Executive	Jigme Namgyel	
Sultan	Hassanal Bolkiah			Brunei	5 October 1967 (Note: Coronation took place 1 August 1968.) (59 years, 44 days)	Bolkiah	Absolute	Al-Muhtadee Billah	
King	Norodom Sihamoni			Cambodia	14 October 2004 (Note: Coronation took place 29 October 2004.) (22 years, 35 days)	Norodom (Note: A branch of the Varman dynasty. The surname "Norodom" is used by the descendants of Norodom I.)	Ceremonial	Hereditary and elective (Note: The king is selected for life by the Royal Council of the Throne from amongst the male descendants of kings Ang Duong, Norodom, and Sisowath.)	
King	Frederik X			Denmark	14 January 2024 (2 years, 308 days)	Glücksburg (Note: Officially the House of Schleswig-Holstein-Sonderburg-Glücksburg, a branch of the House of Oldenburg.) (Note: Agnatically a member of the House of Monpezat, but officially a member of the House of Glücksburg through his mother Margrethe II.)	Ceremonial	Christian, Crown Prince of Denmark	
King (Note: The Monarchy of Eswatini is a diarchy jointly headed by the King and the Queen Mother.)	Mswati III			Eswatini	25 April 1986 (40 years, 207 days)	Dlamini	Absolute	Hereditary and elective (Note: Succession is subject to customary law, and does not follow primogeniture. A council of elders selects who among the reigning king's wives will be mother of the next king. This woman will succeed as queen mother upon her son's ascension to the throne, and will rule alongside him for the duration of his reign. The king's first two wives are considered ineligible.)	
Queen Mother	Ntfombi			Eswatini	10 August 1983 (43 years, 100 days)	Dlamini	Absolute	Hereditary and elective	
Emperor	Naruhito (Note: "Naruhito" is the current emperor's given name, but it is not his regnal name, and he is never referred to as this in Japanese. The era of Naruhito's reign bears the name "Reiwa", and according to custom he will be renamed "Emperor Reiwa" following his death.)			Japan	1 May 2019 (Note: The formal enthronement ceremony was held on 22 October 2019.) (7 years, 201 days)	Imperial House (Note: The Japanese emperor does not have a family name. The use of the name "Yamato" for the household derives from the ancient Yamato Court. It is used often as a name for the imperial dynasty, but has no official basis.)	Ceremonial	Fumihito, Crown Prince Akishino (Heir presumptive) (Note: Succession is based upon male primogeniture. However, Naruhito currently has no male children.)	
King	Abdullah II			Jordan	7 February 1999 (Note: Formally enthroned on 9 June 1999.) (27 years, 284 days)	Al Hāshim	Executive	Hereditary and elective (presumably Hussein bin Abdullah) (Note: Succession is based upon primogeniture. However, the reigning king may also select his successor from among eligible princes.)	
Emir	Mishal Al-Ahmad Al-Jaber Al-Sabah			Kuwait	16 December 2023 (Note: Formally enthroned on 20 December 2023 upon the invitation of Parliament.) (2 years, 337 days)	Al Sabah	Executive	Hereditary and elective (presumably Sabah Al-Khalid Al-Sabah) (Note: The heir is appointed by the reigning emir, and the nomination must also be approved by a majority of members in the National Assembly. The throne was traditionally alternated between the two main branches of the Al Sabah family – the Al Salem and Al Jaber – until 2006. The current emir is of the Al Jaber branch.)	
King	Letsie III			Lesotho	7 February 1996 (Note: Coronation took place 31 October 1997. Has previously reigned as king from 12 November 1990 until 25 January 1995.) (30 years, 284 days)	Moshesh	Ceremonial	Lerotholi Seeiso	
Prince	Hans-Adam II			Liechtenstein	13 November 1989 (Note: Formally enthroned on 15 August 1990. Prior to his accession, Hans-Adam had served as prince regent since 26 August 1984. On 15 August 2004, the prince formally appointed his son Alois, Hereditary Prince of Liechtenstein as regent, in preparation for his succession to the throne, but remained head of state in accordance with the constitution.) (37 years, 5 days)	Liechtenstein	Executive	Alois, Hereditary Prince of Liechtenstein (currently Prince Regent)	
Grand Duke	Guillaume V			Luxembourg	3 October 2025 (Note: Prior to formal enthronement, Guillaume had served as prince regent since 8 October 2024.) (1 year, 46 days)	Luxembourg-Nassau (Note: The royal family of Luxembourg are members of the House of Nassau-Weilburg, descended from the House of Nassau and the Parma branch of the House of Bourbon, a branch of the House of Capet.)	Ceremonial	Prince Charles of Luxembourg	
King (Note: Officially known in Malay as the "Yang di-Pertuan Agong", which roughly translates as "Supreme Head of State", and is rendered officially by government sources in English as "King".)	Ibrahim			Malaysia	31 January 2024 (Note: Elected on 27 October 2023. Term of office started on 31 January 2024.) (2 years, 291 days)	Temenggong	Ceremonial & Federal	Elective (presumably Nazrin Shah) (Note: The Yang di-Pertuan Agong is elected to a five-year term by and from amongst the nine hereditary rulers of the Malay states, who form the Council of Rulers. The position has to date been, by informal agreement, systematically rotated between the nine; the order was originally based on seniority.)	
Prince	Albert II			Monaco	6 April 2005 (Note: Albert II was formally enthroned as prince in a two-part ceremony, in accordance with tradition, on 12 July and 19 November 2005. He had previously served as regent from 31 March 2005 until his accession to the throne.) (21 years, 226 days)	Grimaldi	Executive	Jacques, Hereditary Prince of Monaco	
King	Mohammed VI			Morocco	23 July 1999 (Note: Formally enthroned on 30 July 1999.) (27 years, 118 days)	Alawi	Executive	Moulay Hassan, Crown Prince of Morocco	
King	Willem-Alexander			Netherlands	30 April 2013 (13 years, 202 days)	Orange-Nassau (Note: A branch of the House of Nassau, and agnatically a member of the House of Amsberg.)	Ceremonial	Catharina-Amalia, Princess of Orange	
King	Haakon VIII			Norway	28 August 2026 (Note: Haakon had previously served as regent from 17 August 2026 until his accession to the throne. He took the required constitutional oath before the Storting on 1 September.) (82 days)	Glücksburg	Ceremonial	Ingrid Alexandra, Crown Princess of Norway	
Sultan	Haitham bin Tariq			Oman	11 January 2020 (6 years, 311 days)	Al Said	Absolute	Theyazin bin Haitham	
Emir	Tamim bin Hamad Al Thani			Qatar	25 June 2013 (13 years, 146 days)	Al Thani	Executive	Abdullah bin Hamad	
King	Salman			Saudi Arabia	23 January 2015 (11 years, 299 days)	Al Saud	Absolute	Mohammed bin Salman (Note: Succession is determined by consensus within the House of Saud as to who will be Crown Prince. This consensus may change depending on the Crown Prince's actions:)	
King	Felipe VI			Spain	19 June 2014 (12 years, 152 days)	Bourbon-Anjou (Note: A branch of the House of Bourbon.)	Ceremonial	Leonor, Princess of Asturias (Heir presumptive) (Note: Succession is based upon male primogeniture. However, Felipe VI currently has no male children.)	
King	Carl XVI Gustaf			Sweden	15 September 1973 (Note: Formally enthroned on 19 September 1973.) (53 years, 64 days)	Bernadotte	Ceremonial	Victoria, Crown Princess of Sweden	
King	Rama X, Vajiralongkorn (Note: He is also styled Rama X.)			Thailand	13 October 2016 (Note: Vajiralongkorn was proclaimed King on 1 December 2016 with retroactive effect to the date of his father's death. The coronation took place from 4 – 6 May 2019.) (10 years, 36 days)	Chakri	Ceremonial	Dipangkorn Rasmijoti (Heir presumptive)	
King	Tupou VI			Tonga	18 March 2012 (14 years, 245 days)	Tupou (Note: A line of the Tuʻi Kanokupolu dynasty.)	Executive	Tupoutoʻa ʻUlukalala	
President	Mohamed bin Zayed Al Nahyan			United Arab Emirates	14 May 2022 (4 years, 188 days)	Al Nahyan (Note: The Al Nahyan are a branch of the Al Falahi, a clan of the Yas tribe.)	Executive & Federal (Note: The Prime Minister is the head of the government. However, with the consent of the Supreme Council, the office is appointed by the President, who retains considerable power.)	Hereditary and elective (presumably Khaled bin Mohamed Al Nahyan) (Note: According to the Constitution, the President of the United Arab Emirates is elected by the Federal Supreme Council from among the individual rulers of the seven emirates. However, by informal agreement the Presidency is always passed to the head of the Al Nahyan clan, the Sheikh of Abu Dhabi (see constituent monarchs), which makes it a de facto hereditary position. In addition, the appointed Prime Minister has always been the head of the Al Maktoum clan and Sheikh of Dubai.)	
Pope	Leo XIV (Note: Formerly Cardinal Robert Francis Prevost of the United States and Peru. Reigns as Sovereign of the Vatican City State, by virtue of being Bishop of Rome.)			Vatican City (Holy See)	8 May 2025 (1 year, 194 days)	—N/a	Absolute	Elective	

== See also ==
- List of current reigning monarchs by length of reign
- List of current non-sovereign monarchs
- List of current heads of state and government
- Heads of former ruling families
- List of monarchies
- List of current heirs apparent
- List of current consorts of sovereigns
- Records of heads of state
