= Corporate Fraud Task Force =

U.S. federal task force

The Corporate Fraud Task Force was a United States Federal Government-wide task force formed by President George W. Bush in the wake of corporate accounting scandals that shook investor confidence. Task Force establishment occurred through delegated legislation with the issuance of Executive Order 13271 of July 9, 2002, ‘‘Establishment of the Corporate Fraud Task Force’’.

President Bush had remarked in the address announcing the creation of CFTF that...

‘‘We will use the full weight of the law to expose and root out corruption,’’ Bush said on July 9, 2002.‘‘My administration will do everything in our power to end the days of cooking the books, shading the truth and breaking our laws.’’

According to CNN at the time:

‘‘Bush's speech was designed in part to refute critics who have called him too cozy with Corporate America -- particularly Democrats who, in a congressional election year, seem unlikely to cut him much slack, especially after raising questions about his own past business dealings.’’

‘‘The speech, which the administration had been advertising for weeks in advance, came a day after the president held an impromptu news conference and was forced to defend his sale of stock in Harken Energy 12 years ago.’’

== Membership ==
The following Department officials were standing members of the President's Corporate Fraud Task Force:

- Director of the Federal Bureau of Investigation
- Assistant Attorney General Criminal Division
- Assistant Attorney General Tax Division
- United States Attorney for the Central District of California
- United States Attorney for the Northern District of California
- United States Attorney for the Northern District of Illinois
- United States Attorney for the Eastern District of New York
- United States Attorney for the Southern District of New York
- United States Attorney for the Eastern District of Pennsylvania
- United States Attorney for the Southern District of Texas

The following agency officials made up the membership in the interagency group also within the President's Corporate Fraud Task Force:

- The Secretary of Labor
- The Department of Housing and Urban Development
- The Secretary of the Treasury
  - The Comptroller of the Currency
  - The Director of Office of Thrift Supervision
  - The Special Inspector General for the Troubled Asset Relief Program (TARP)
- The Chairman of the Commodities Futures Trading Commission
- The Chairman of the Federal Communications Commission
- The Chairman of the Federal Energy Regulatory Commission
- The Chairman of the Securities and Exchange Commission
- The Chairman of the Federal Reserve Board
- The Chief Inspector of the United States Postal Inspection Service
- The Director of the Federal Housing Finance Agency

== Termination ==
The Corporate Fraud Task Force was terminated on November 17, 2009 by President Barack Obama with the issuance of Executive Order 13519, entitled ‘‘Establishment of the Financial Fraud Enforcement Task Force’’.
