= Ioueldaob =

Region of Palau

Ioueldaob (sometimes spelled Eoueldaob) is a region in the Republic of Palau located south of the island of Babeldaob. It includes the islands within the State of Koror, the states of Peleliu and Angaur. It is a traditional division between the northern and the southern islands. Ioueldaob literally means "lower sea", while Babeldaob means "upper sea".

== List of States in the Region ==
- Koror
- Peleliu
- Angaur
