= Fictional currency =

Media of exchange found in narratives with imaginative elements

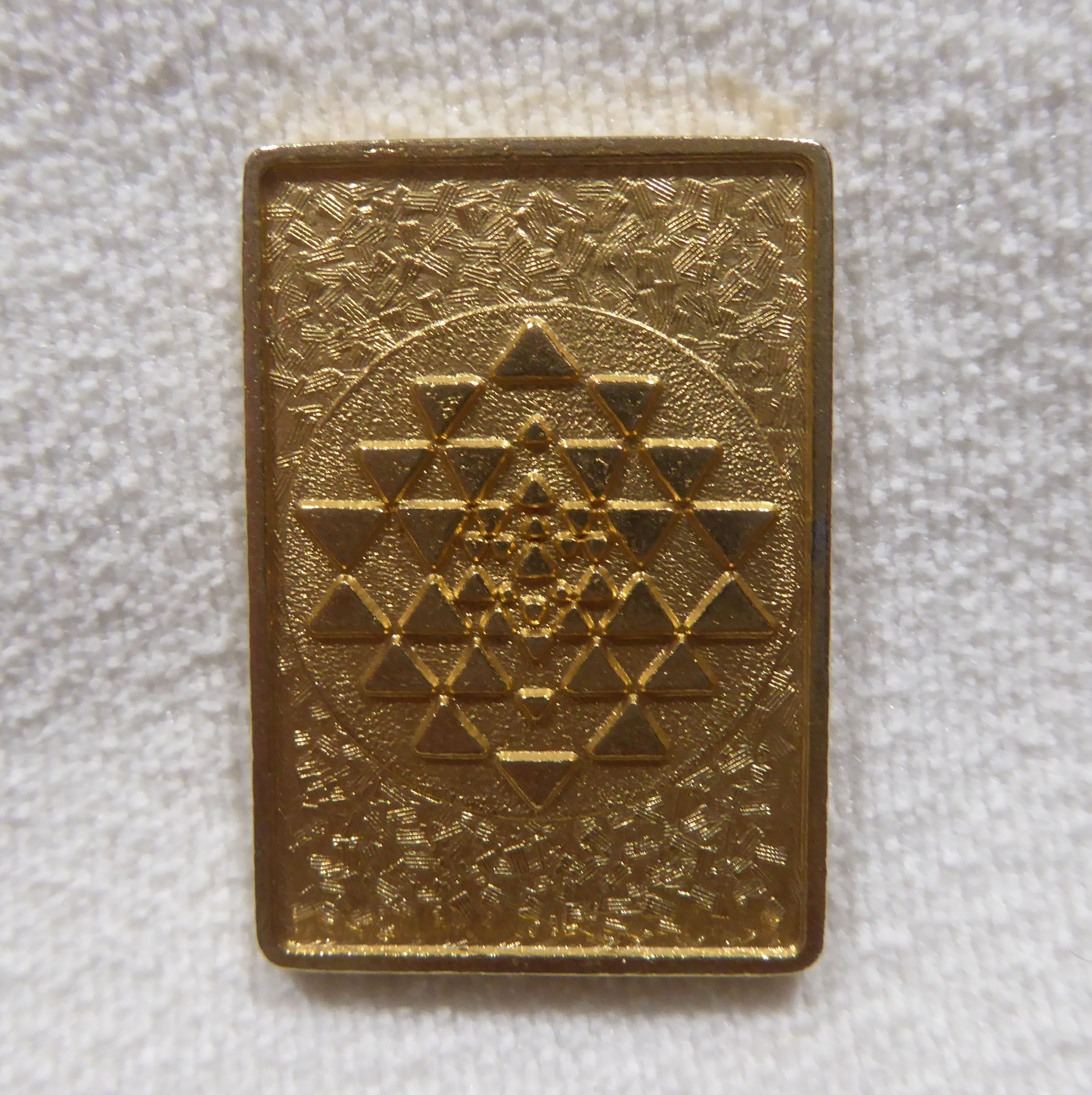
A "cubit", a fictional currency on the Battlestar Galactica sci-fi TV series.

A fictional currency is some form of system of money defined, depicted, or alluded to, in works of fiction, such as novels, films or video games. The names of units of such currency are sometimes based on extant or historic currencies (e.g. "Altairian dollars" or "Earth yen") while other names, such as "Kalganids" in Asimov's Foundation series, may be wholly invented. A particularly common type, especially in science fiction, is electronically managed "credits". In some works of fiction, exchange media other than money are used. These are not currency as such, but rather nonstandard media of exchange used to avoid the difficulties of ensuring "double coincidence of wants" in a barter system.

== Concept and creation ==
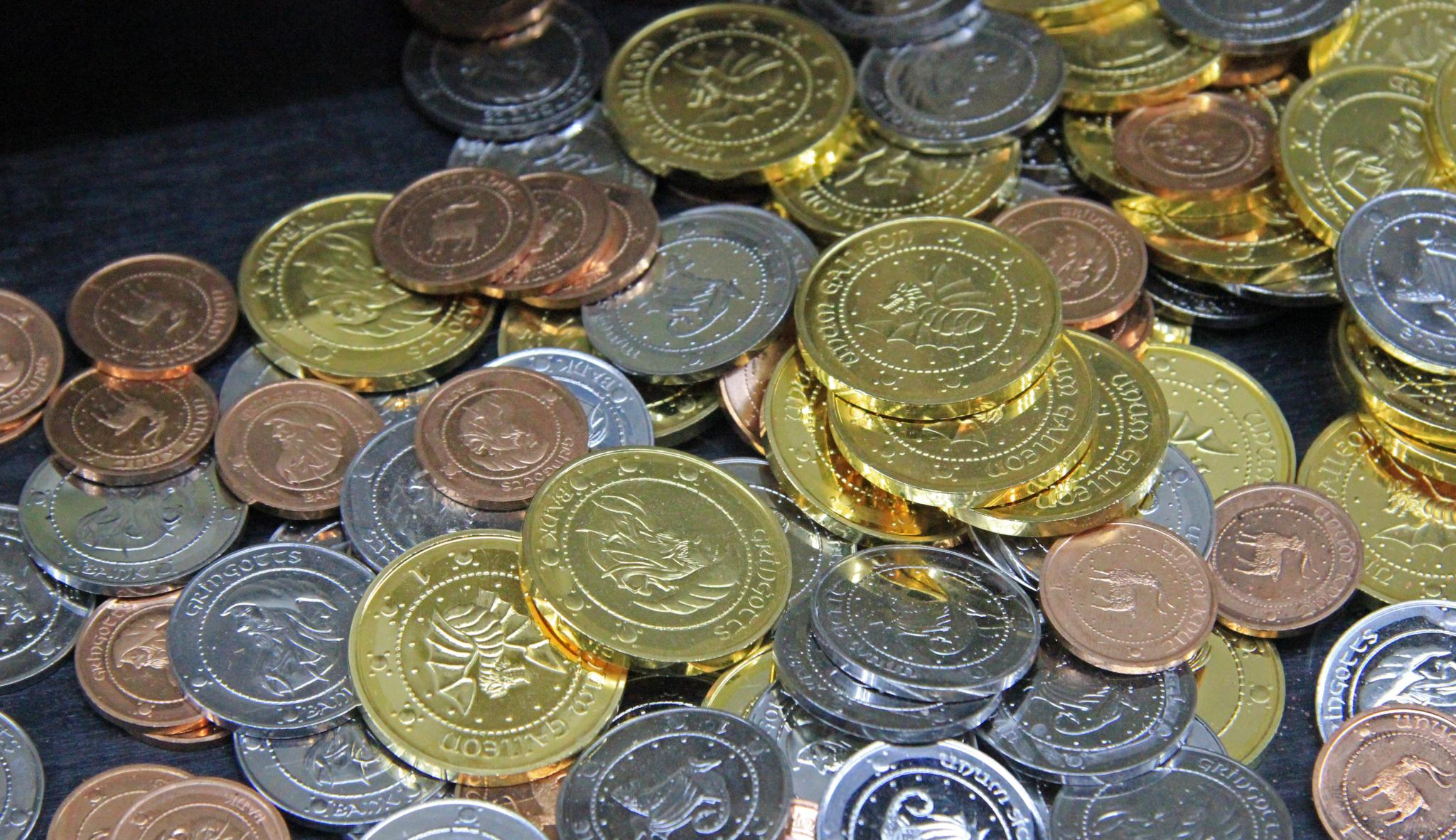
Coin props depicting a fictional wizarding currency in the Harry Potter fantasy films.

Authors doing worldbuilding and creating imaginary societies have to take care when naming fictional currencies because of the associations between currency names and countries; recognizable names for currencies of the future (e.g. dollar or yen) may be used to imply how history has progressed, but would appear out of place in an entirely alien civilization. Historical fiction may need research. Writers need not explain the exact value of their fictional currencies or provide an exchange rate to modern money; they may rely on the intuitive grasp of their readers, for instance that one currency unit is probably of little value, but that millions of units will be worth a lot.

Currencies in science fiction face particular problems due to futuristic technology allowing matter replication and hence forgery. Authors have proposed currencies that are incapable of replication such as the non-replicable "latinum" used by the Ferengi in the Star Trek universe, or the currency in Pandora's Millions by George O. Smith, which is booby-trapped to explode if scanned by a replicating machine. Money in fantasy fiction faces analogous challenges from the use of magic; in the Harry Potter series by J. K. Rowling, magically created currency is time-limited, while in Ursula K. Le Guin's fictional realm of Earthsea, the world's equilibrium is unbalanced when something is created from nothing.

In the Demon Princes pentalogy by Jack Vance the currency "SVU" or Standard Value Unit was described as being employed on most major settled worlds and as having a value equivalent to one hour of unskilled labor in standardized conditions. Its printed notes were verifiable by scanning with a device called a "fake meter", the function of which comprised a critical theme of the second book in the series, The Killing Machine. The protagonist undermines the system and prints 10 billion SVU undetectable by the fake meter, thus setting the stage for three books to follow.

The long-term value of currency is an issue in works featuring journeys through time or the lapse of very long periods (for instance due to the deep sleep or cryopreservation of the protagonists). In some cases, compound interest may swell small amounts into a fortune, as happens in the Hitchhiker's Guide to the Galaxy by Douglas Adams, When the Sleeper Wakes by H. G. Wells, and the Futurama episode "A Fishful of Dollars". In other stories, inflation reduces the value of money, as in The Age of the Pussyfoot by Frederik Pohl. Other plot factors can affect the worth of currency: for instance, in The Moon Metal by Garrett P. Serviss the world's currency standard must be switched from gold to a mysterious new chemical, "artemisium", after the discovery of vast mineral deposits in the Antarctic devalues all known precious metals.

While modern fiat currencies lack intrinsic worth, some fictional currencies are designed to be valuable in their own right. Intrinsically valuable currencies are used in the Frank Herbert's Dune universe; the Dragonlance world of Krynn where steel coins are the primary currency and are more valuable than gold by weight; and the Apprentice Adept series by Piers Anthony. The space opera Consider Phlebas by Iain M. Banks features coins convertible for chemical elements, land, or computers. In utopian fiction, a money-free economy may still need a unit of exchange: in The Great Explosion by Eric Frank Russell, the Gands use favor-exchange based on "obs" (obligations).

== Trends in depictions ==
The use of "credits" is particularly common in futuristic settings, so much so that Sam Humphries has pointed it out as a cliché: "In any science-fiction movie, anywhere in the galaxy, currency is referred to as 'credits.'" Credits are frequently envisioned as a form of electronic money.

In science fiction set in the near future, modern currency names are often used. The selection of familiar currencies such as the dollar or yen, particularly in the far future, may be used to make suggestions about the way history unfolded; however, it would seem strange for aliens to use a recognizable currency.

== See also ==
- Quatloos.com, anti-fraud website named after a fictional currency
- Virtual economy
