= Operation Broken Trust =

Operation Broken Trust, the largest investment fraud sweep by the Federal government of the United States, was conducted between August 16 and December 1, 2010. The stated purpose of the operation was to "root out and expose" investment scams within the U.S. and to educate the public. It was announced that the operation involved 343 criminal cases with damages of $8.3 billion and 189 civil cases with damages of $2.1 billion; more than 120,000 victims were affected.

== Financial Fraud Enforcement Task Force ==
The inter-agency task force was set up by President Barack Obama in November 2009 to supersede President George W Bush's Corporate Fraud Task Force. At the December 6, 2010, press conference, participating agencies were represented by Attorney General Eric Holder for the United States Department of Justice, Federal Bureau of Investigation (FBI) Executive Assistant Director Shawn Henry, U.S. Securities and Exchange Commission (SEC) Director of Enforcement Robert Khuzami, U.S. Postal Inspection Service (USPIS) Chief Postal Inspector Guy Cottrell, Deputy Chief Rick Raven of the Internal Revenue Service Criminal Investigation (IRS-CI), and Acting Director of Enforcement Vince McGonagle of the U.S. Commodity Futures Trading Commission (CFTC). Other participating agencies included the U.S. Secret Service and the National Association of Attorneys General.

== Scope of the investigation ==
On December 6, 2010, the Task Force went public announcing that it had examined scams targeting individual investors, not complex corporate fraud issues. In each case individual investors entrusted their money to individuals who presented "investment opportunities" promising superior returns. These investments were either fictitious or different from those claimed, and often involved Ponzi schemes. Affinity fraud was directed at the savings of trusting but often uninformed people. Scams included fraud in commodities, real estate, foreign exchanges, business opportunities, and market manipulation (such as pump and dump). Khuzami explained that "fraud by well-known companies or high-profile executives gets the biggest headlines, but other scams are equally devastating to hard working families and retirees", and stressed that law enforcement will "pursue fraud in whatever form."

Operation Broken Trust included cases that were investigated already during the Bush administration or before the formation of the task force, and many were well on the way to completion before the sweep began. Also, the mixing of criminal cases and civil cases led to overlap and double counting in the number of defendants, victims, and losses.

== Reaction ==
Reactions to Holder's announcement about Operation Broken Trust were framed by the apparent lack of governmental efforts of prosecuting individuals who may bear responsibility for the 2008 financial crisis, specifically since nobody at Lehman, Merrill Lynch, Citigroup, and Goldman Sachs (other than Fabrice Tourre) has been charged criminally. Thus it was criticized as allocating resources to the wrong arena, described as a "sideshow", and going for the "little fish". It was opined that rather than focusing on small-time operators, the government should prosecute individuals for their role in the 2008 financial crisis even if guilty verdicts were not assured; court proceedings would allow for transparency, serve as a deterrent, and provide lessons on how to prevent future grand scale fraud.

== Results ==
At the time of the announcement on December 6, 2012 eighty-seven defendants had received prison sentences that in some cases exceeded 20 years. Particular prosecutions include Palm Polo Holdings Ltd, which was found not guilty after being charged with violations of the Clean Water Act. A former army captain was convicted of Honest Services fraud for taking bribes in Iraq.
