= Quatloos.com =

Anti-fraud website

Quatloos!
- Cyber Museum of Scams & Frauds
- Website type: Finance
- Available in: English
- Founded: 1997
- Founder: Jay Adkisson
- Website: http://quatloosia.blogspot.com/

Quatloos.com is an anti-fraud website maintained by a non-profit corporation, Financial and Tax Fraud Education Associates, Inc. It evolved out of a basic educational website on the topic created in 1997 by Jay Adkisson, an attorney, stockbroker, and author on asset protection law, who is a partner at Adkisson PLLC and a contributor on wealth preservation topics to Forbes.com, who has testified as an expert witness before the US Senate Finance Committee.

Forbes selected it as one of its "Best of The Web" sites in 2000. In 2003, it was featured in PC Magazine's "Site of the Week" series, and was included in their 2004 feature on the top 100 undiscovered web sites, where it was recommended as a good place to learn about scams and fraud. In the 2000s it was cited as an authoritative source for scams in the financial media, and by government organizations, and had reportedly been frequented by employees of the US Justice and Treasury departments, as well as those of the US federal courts.

In 2010, the blog was moved from its original domain at Quatloos.com to a blogspot page. The updates and activity on the site lessened over the next decade, with its final post in December 2022.

== Etymology ==
The term quatloos appears in an episode of Star Trek, although it may have been in use prior to this; it was the name of a currency used for betting in the episode "The Gamesters of Triskelion." It was chosen for the site as it has come to mean a "fictional currency," appropriate for a site that fights fraudulent money scams.
