= Flèche faîtière =

Carved rooftop structure on Kanak houses in New Caledonia

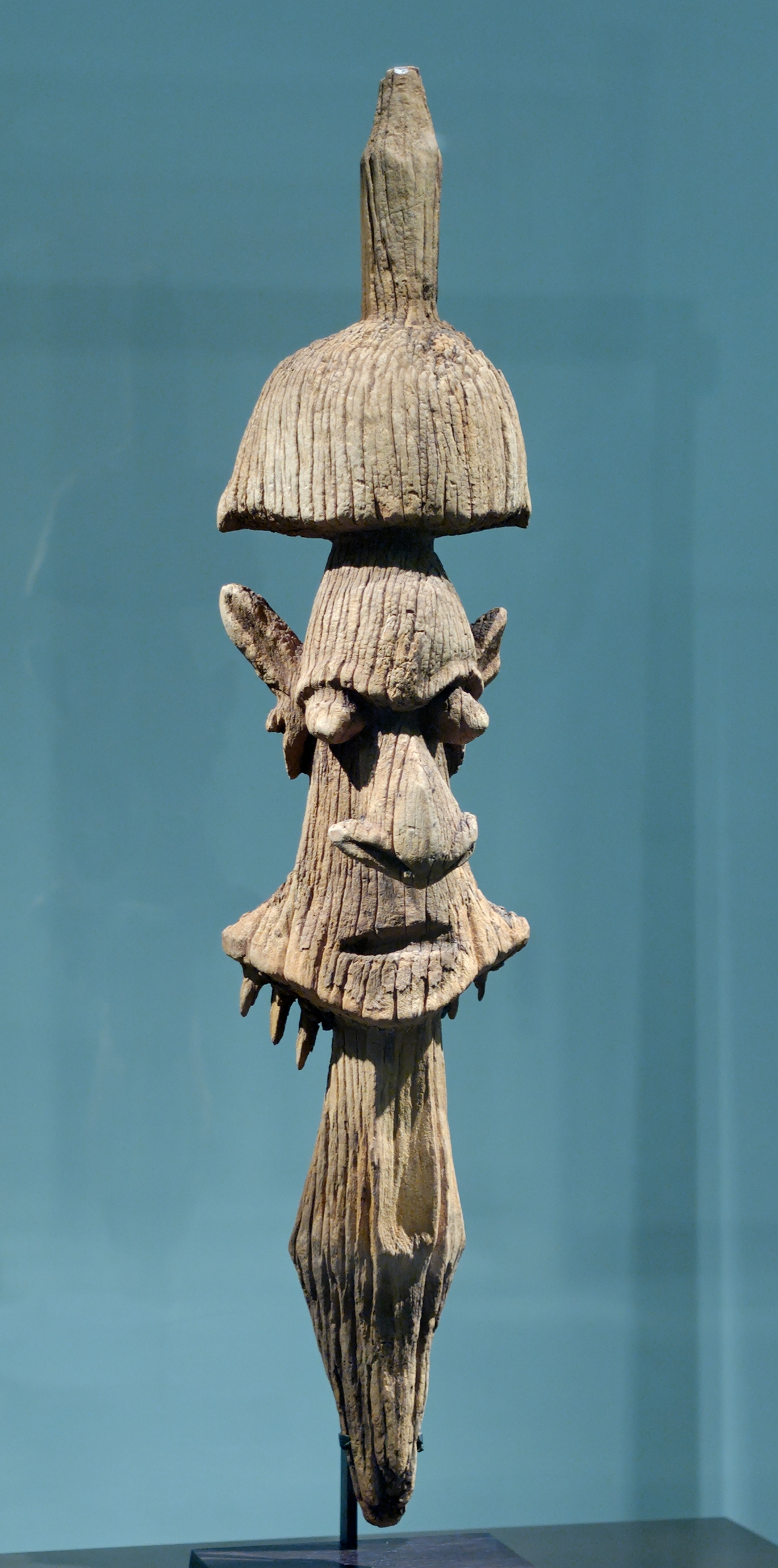
Fragment of a roof finial of a large clan house, a sculpture of the Kanak people made of Houp wood, 18th century

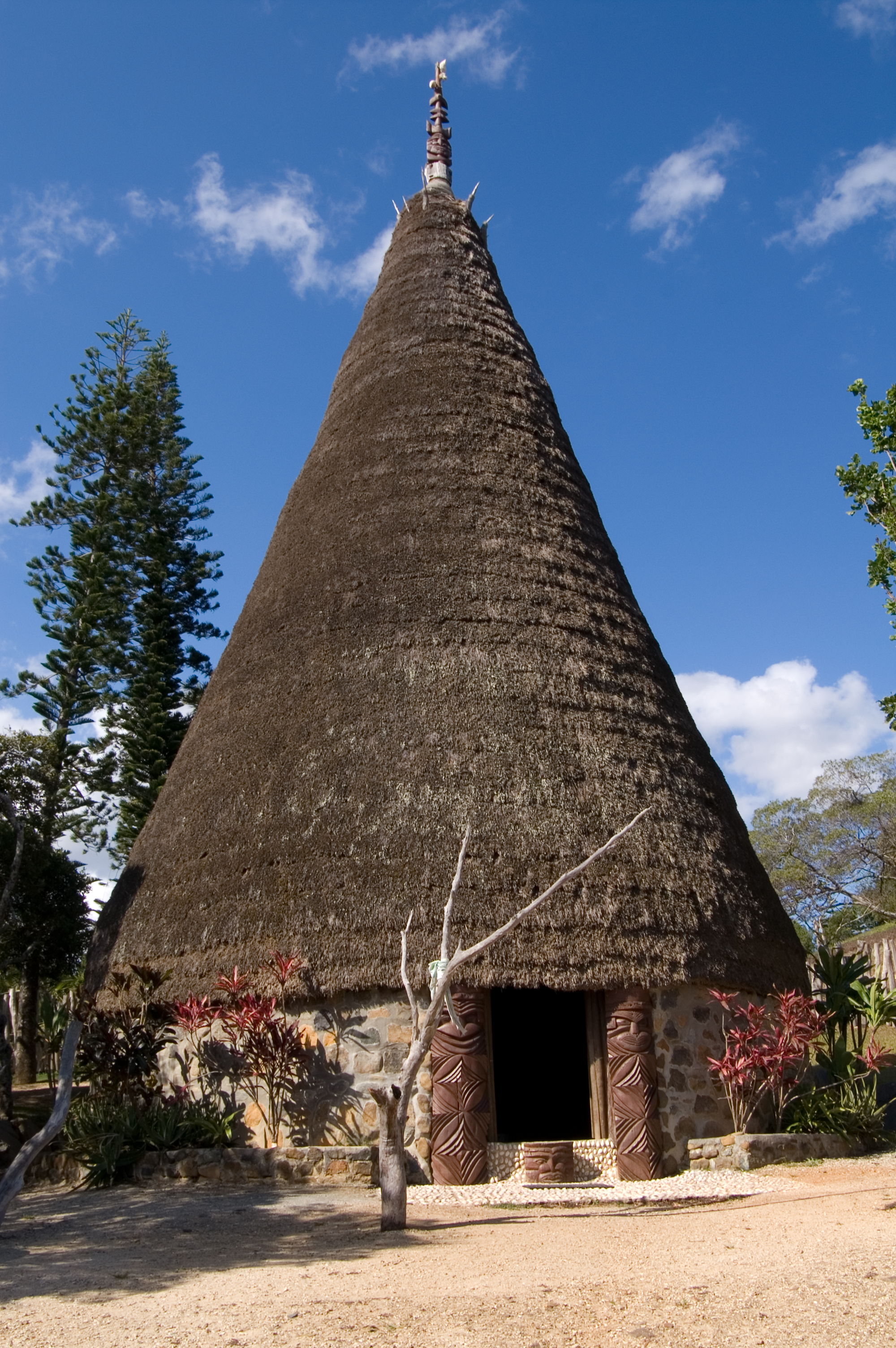
A flèche faîtière on a Kanak house at the Jean-Marie Tjibaou Cultural Centre, Nouméa, New Caledonia.

A flèche faîtière (French pronunciation: [flɛʃ fɛtjɛʁ]) is a French term that describes a carved rooftop spear, spire or finial that adorns houses of Melanesians in New Caledonia (the Kanak), particularly those of their chiefs. The ceremonial carving is the home of ancestral spirits and is characterized by three major components. The ancestor is symbolized by a flat, crowned face in the centre of the spear. The ancestor's voice is symbolized by a long, rounded pole that is run through by conch shells. The symbolic connection of the clan, through the chief, is a base, which is planted into the case's central pole. Sharply pointed wood pieces fan out from either end of the central area, symbolically preventing bad spirits from being able to reach the ancestor. It evokes, beyond a particular ancestor, the community of ancestors. The flèche faîtière was depicted on a 2007 New Caledonian stamp.

== Etymology ==
Flèche is a general architectural term for "spire". It is used to define a small but tall post that is fixed at the crossing of the nave and transepts in cathedrals and large churches. Flèche faîtière means "carved roof top spear", which adorns the grande case or the "Great Hut" of the Chief of a Kanak clan.

== Symbolism ==
The flèche faîtière is wood sculpture that represents the spirit of Kanak culture, which resembles a small totem pole. As it represented the power of the clan Chiefs of Kanaks over their subjects, it was adopted as part of the flag of the Kanaks by the organization leading the independent movement in New Caledonia. The Grand Huts also known as grande case (chief's hut) are decorated with a flèche faîtière as a filial, representing the ancestral spirits, symbolic of transition between the world of the dead and the world of the living.

The arrow or the spear normally has a needle at the end to insert threaded shells from bottom to top; one of the shells contains arrangements to ensure protection of the house and the country. During wars enemies attacked this symbolic finial. After the death of a Kanak chief, over whose Great House the flèche faîtière is fixed, it is removed and his family takes it to their home. Though it was allowed to be used again as a sign of respect, it is normally kept at burial grounds of noted citizens or at the mounds of abandoned grand houses.

== Flag ==
Cultural flag of the Kanak community, showing a flèche faîtière (a spear–like wooden totem monument placed atop traditional dwellings).

The flèche faîtière also adorns the official flag of the Kanak people. As it represented the power of the Chiefs over their subjects, it was adopted as part of the flag of the Kanaks by the organization leading the independent movement in New Caledonia. The flag of Kanaky is set in three colours namely, green for earth and flora, red for blood and sacrifice of people and blue signifying sea and sky. The solar disk with the hut inscribed, with the ridge pole in black, which is the symbolic flèche faîtière, is set in the middle of the flag. The flag representing the indigenous movement of the Kanak people was endorsed by the territorial congress to be flown alongside the national flag of France, and the Prime Minister of France was set to hoist the Kanak flag during his visit to New Caledonia in July 2010. The indigenous Kanak flag and the French tricolour were hoisted above the high commission in Nouméa, the capital of New Caledonia. It is one of the few countries to have two national flags. However, there is a strong move now to evolve a new flag for New Caledonia, which would represent elements of the "Tricolor and the Kanak flags as a common destiny".

== Notable examples ==
The Mwa Ka is located in a landscaped square opposite the Musée de Nouvelle-Calédonie and has a 12-metre pole, topped with flèche faîtière; its carvings represent the eight customary regions of New Caledonia. The Jean-Marie Tjibaou Cultural Centre has numerous huts with flèche faîtière.

== See also ==
- Kanak people
- New Caledonia
- Noumea
