= Bougna =

Traditional feast dish in New Caledonia

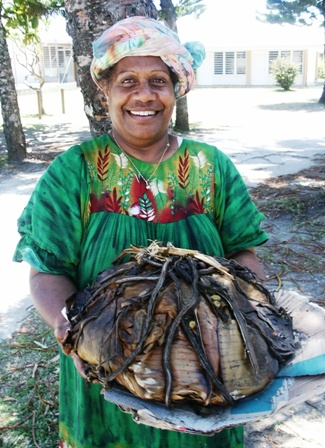
A Kanak woman with bougna

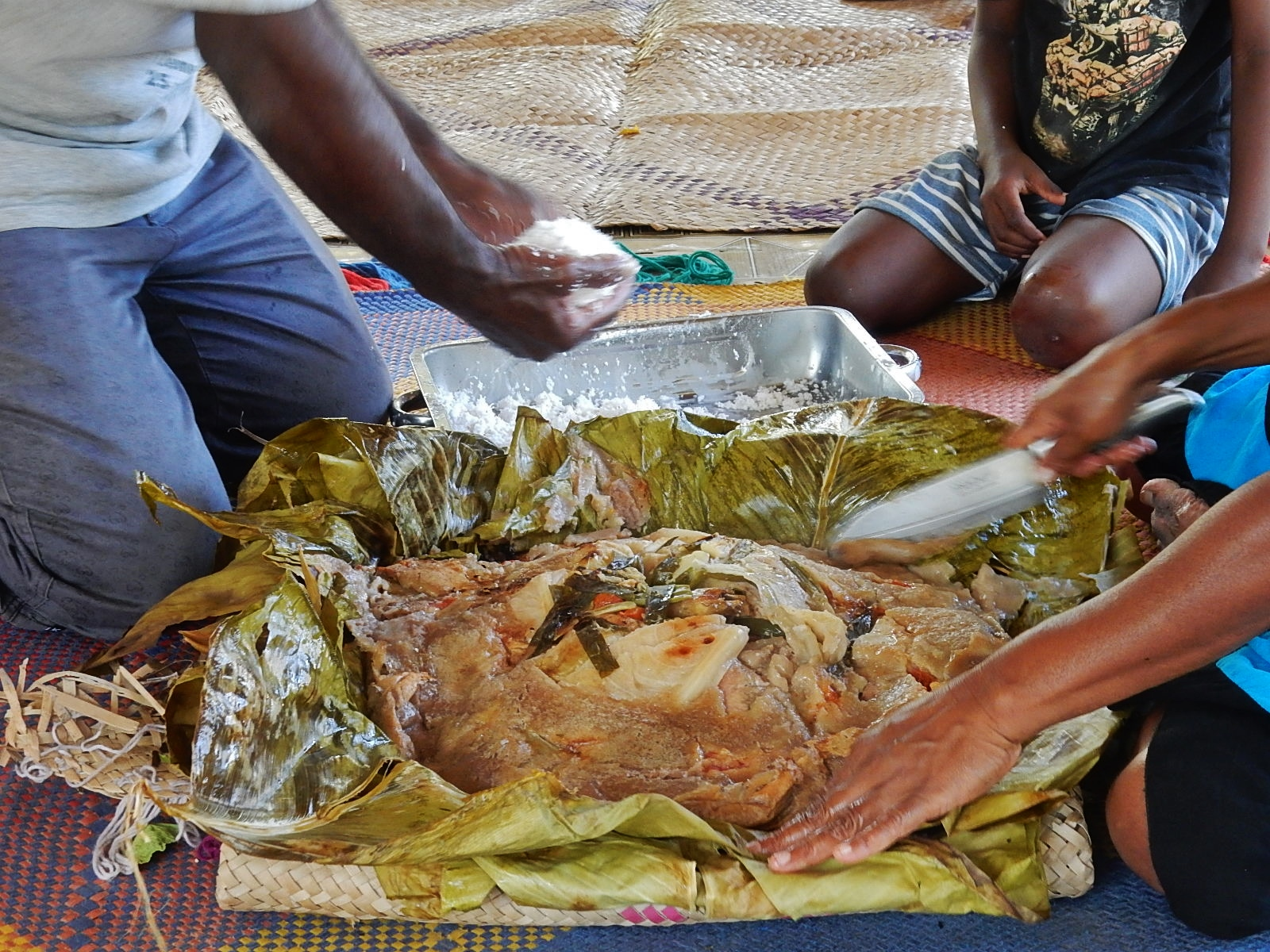
Unwrapped bunya in Vanuatu

Bougna is a traditional feast dish of the Kanak people of New Caledonia. The word "bougna" comes from the Drehu word "puhnya" meaning "bundle", "pack". The dish is also eaten in Vanuatu, where it is known as bunya or bunia.

Bougna often contains taro, yam, sweet potato, banana, and pieces of either chicken, fish, crab, prawns or lobster. The contents are wrapped in banana leaves and are then buried to cook in a ground oven, which uses red-hot rocks heated by fire. After about two hours of cooking, the banana leaves are unearthed and unwrapped, and the contents are eaten.
