= Coral Reef Initiative for the South Pacific =

French project founded in 2002

Coral Reef Initiative for the South Pacific (CRISP) is a French inter-ministerial project founded in 2002. Its aims focus on developing a vision for the future for coral reef ecosystems and the communities that depend on them within the French overseas territories and Pacific Island developing countries. Programme coordination is provided by the CRISP Coordination Unit and a programme manager who is supported by scientific counselors. The programme is hosted by the Secretariat of the Pacific Community who is located in Nouméa, New Caledonia. CRISP is under the institutional protection from the Pacific Community and the South Pacific Regional Environment Programme. It is a regional initiative that promotes the protection and sustainable management of the coral reefs of the Pacific island states.

== History ==
During the French-Oceania Summit of 2003, French President Jacques Chirac promoted the idea of bringing together Oceania participants to work towards sustainable development of the Pacific Ocean coral reefs. Its launch was announced in September 2004 during the South Pacific Regional Environment Programme (SPREP) meeting held in Papeete, French Polynesia. At the initial launch, the project was valued at €10 million over the course of three years, involving fifteen Pacific Island countries and three French Pacific Territories, (New Caledonia, French Polynesia, and Wallis and Futuna) envisioned as a "driving belt" between these locales. The programme's implementation was facilitated by the United Nations Environment Programme (UNEP). Its establishment also included a political desire for local oversight in the Pacific region.

== Programmes ==
Some of CRISP's components include integrated coastal and watershed management, and development of coral ecosystems. The ReefBase Pacific project is a collaborative programme with Secretariat of the Pacific Regional Environment Programme (SPREP). International Coral Reef Action Network (IRCAN) projects have also been incorporated into CRISP.

An additional component is educational, such as the Workshop on Economic Evaluation of MPAs that was sponsored by CRISP in 2008. In partnership with SPREP, CRISP also supports activities of various societies such as the Aiga Folau o Samoa (Samoa Voyaging Society), which is promoting the spread of regional awareness in protecting the environment. CRISP provides support to organizations in developing case studies, of which Navakavu Locally Managed Marine Area, Viti Levu, Fiji (2009) is one example. For the Navakavu Locally Managed Marine Area study, CRISP provided biological monitoring test and comparison, as well as fish larvae research. Pacific COREMO (Coral Reef Monitoring) database training of 2009 through the Institute of Marine Resources at the University of the South Pacific included representatives from CRISP, one of its partner organizations. Supporting Kanak traditions, CRISP's partnership with Conservation International provided recommendations and underwater species guides to the Kanak people.
