= Agency for the Development of Kanak Culture =

Administrative agency

The Agency for the Development of Kanak Culture (Agence de développement de la culture kanak, ADCK), on New Caledonia is an administrative agency, established in 1989, to preserve and promote Kanak and Pacific Islands culture, art and heritage. It was formed on the first anniversary of the signature Matignon-Oudinot Agreements to recognise and promote the values of Kanak culture.

Jean-Marie Tjibaou Cultural Centre is ADCK's headquarters. It is the place of identity's affirmation and the recognition of cultural creations.
