= Drehu language =

Austronesian language of Lifou Island, New Caledonia

Drehu
- Region: Lifou, New Caledonia
- Native speakers: unknown; est. 13,000 includes many L2 speakers (2009)
- Language family: Austronesian: Malayo-Polynesian; Oceanic; Southern Oceanic; New Caledonian – Loyalties; Loyalty Islands; Drehu

Language codes
- ISO 639-3: dhv
- Glottolog: dehu1237
- Drehu is not endangered according to the classification system of the UNESCO Atlas of the World's Languages in Danger

Drehu (pronounced [ɖehu]; also known as Dehu, Lifou, Lifu, qene drehu) is an Austronesian language mostly spoken on Lifou Island, Loyalty Islands, New Caledonia. It has about 12,000 fluent speakers and the status of a French regional language. This status means that pupils can take it as an optional topic for the baccalauréat in New Caledonia itself or on the French mainland. It has been also taught at the Institut national des langues et civilisations orientales (INALCO) in Paris since 1973 and at the University of New Caledonia since 2000. Like other Kanak languages, Drehu is regulated by the Académie des langues kanak, founded in 2007.

A separate register of Drehu, known as qene miny, was once used to speak to chiefs (joxu). Very few Drehu speakers know qene miny today.

== Phonology ==
=== Vowels ===
	Front	Central	Back
High	i iː		u uː
Mid	e eː	ø øː	o oː
Open	æ æː		ɑ ɑː

/e/ is heard as [ɛ] before nasals.

/ø/ can sometimes be [e] before nasals.

=== Consonants ===
		Bilabial	Dental	Alveolar	Retroflex	Alveopalatal	Velar	Glottal
Nasals	voiceless	m̥		n̥		ɲ̊	ŋ̊	
Nasals	voiced	m		n		ɲ	ŋ	
Stops and affricates	voiceless	p		t	ʈ	t͡ʃ	k	
Stops and affricates	voiced	b (Note: /b d͡ʒ v/ occur only in loanwords.)		d	ɖ	d͡ʒ	ɡ	
Fricatives	voiceless	f	θ	s			x	h
Fricatives	voiced	v	ð	z				
Approximants	voiceless	ʍ		l̥				
Approximants	voiced	w		l				

== Writing system ==
Drehu was first written in the Latin script by the Polynesian and English missionaries of the London Missionary Society during the 1840s, with the help of the native population. The first complete Bible was published in 1890. The Bible writing system did not distinguish between the dental (written "d", "t") and the alveolar/retroflex ("dr" and "tr") consonants, which for a long time were written indifferently "d" and "t". In Drehu /θ/ and /ð/ are not dental but interdental consonants. The new writing system was created during the 1970s.

Grapheme-phoneme correspondence
Grapheme	a	aa	b	c	d	dj	dr	e	ee	ë	ëë	f	g	h	hl	hm	hn	hng	hny	i	ii	j	k
Phoneme	/ɑ/	/ɑː/	/b/	/c/	/d̪/	/ɟ/	/d/	/e/	/eː/	/ɛ/	/ɛː/	/f/	/g/	/h/	/l̥/	/m̥/	/n̥/	/ŋ̊/	/ɲ̊/	/i/	/iː/	/ð/	/k/
Grapheme	l	m	n	ng	ny	o	oo	ö	öö	p	q	r	s	sh	t	th	tr	u	uu	v	w	x	z
Phoneme	/l/	/m/	/n/	/ŋ/	/ɲ/	/o/	/oː/	/ʌ/	/ʌː/	/p/	/w̥/	/r/	/s/	/ʃ/	/t/	/θ/	/t/	/u/	/uː/	/v/	/w/	/x/	/z/

== Grammar ==
=== Personal pronouns ===
Singular

- Eni/ni: I, me
- Eö/ö: you
- Nyipë/nyipëti: you (a polite form of address to a chief (joxu)or an older man)
- Nyipo/nyipot(i): you (a polite form of address to an older woman)
- Angeic(e): he, him, she
- Nyidrë/nyidrët(i): he, him (a polite form of address to a chief (joxu)or an older man)
- Nyidro/nyidrot(i): you (a polite form of address to an older woman)
- Ej(e): it

Dual

- Eaho/ho: we two (exclusive)
- Easho/sho (easo/so): we two (inclusive)
- Epon(i)/pon(i): you two
- Eahlo: they two
- Lue ej(e): they two for things and animals

Plural

- Eahun(i)/hun(i): we, us (exclusive)
- Eashë/shë, easë/së: we all, all of us (inclusive)
- Epun(i)/pun(i): you
- Angaatr(e): they, them
- Itre ej(e): they, them (for things and animals)

== Bibliography ==
- Notes Grammaticales sur la langue de Lifu (Loyaltys) (in French). Paris. 1882.
- Ray, Sidney H. (July–December 1917). "The People and Language of Lifu, Loyalty Islands". Journal of the Royal Anthropological Institute. 47. Royal Anthropological Institute of Great Britain and Ireland: 239–322. doi:10.2307/2843343. JSTOR 2843343.
- Walsh, D. T. (1967). Dehu Grammar. Canberra: Pacific Linguistics.
- (in French) Le drehu, langue de Lifou (Iles Loyauté): phonologie, morphologie, syntaxe. ISBN 2-85297-142-9
- (in French) Maurice Lenormand, Dictionnaire de la langue de Lifou. Le Qene Drehu, 1999, Nouméa, Le Rocher-à-la-Voile, 533p
- Tryon, Darrell T. Dehu-English dictionary. C-6, vi + 142 pages. Pacific Linguistics, The Australian National University, 1967. doi:10.15144/PL-C6
- Tryon, Darrell T. English-Dehu dictionary. C-7, iv + 165 pages. Pacific Linguistics, The Australian National University, 1967. doi:10.15144/PL-C7
- Tryon, Darrell T. Dehu grammar. B-7, xii + 122 pages. Pacific Linguistics, The Australian National University, 1968. doi:10.15144/PL-B7
