= Kanak war club =

Traditional hardwood clubs used by the Kanak tribes of New Caledonia

A Kanak war club is a traditional weapon (mace) of the Kanak tribes of New Caledonia.

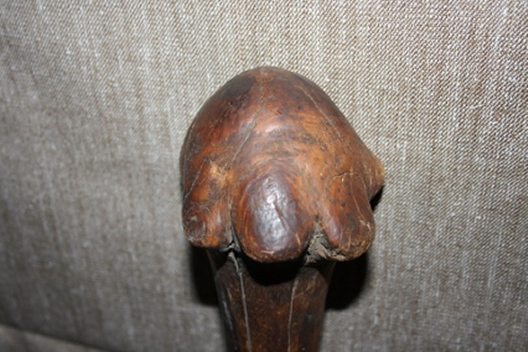
Kanak mace's striking head

== Uses ==
Usually cut from a hardwood type of iron wood, gaiac or kohu they were used for war. Like all the Pacific clubs, their forms were of a very wide variety and specific to each country and each purpose. They were found in phallic form, but also in the form of a fungus or a bird’s beak. Their striking head consisted of a root knot. These weapons were originally decorated with plants, human hair, or cloths, and were wielded with one or two hands.

Oceanian art specialist Roger Boulay makes a distinction between a mace, that is "an object whose percussion point is in the axis of the handle" and a club, that is "an object whose percussion point is shifted in relation to this axis".

The Kanak called the "bird beak" club a "turtle beak".

== Gallery ==
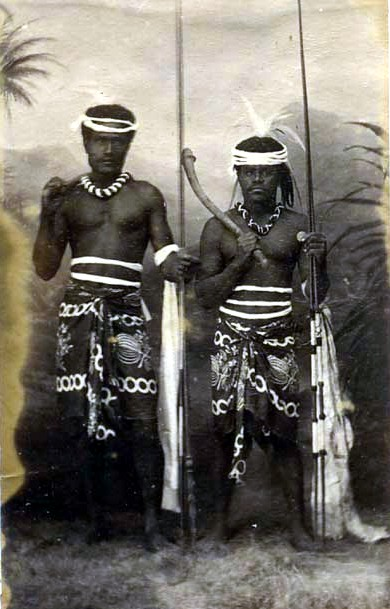
Kanak warriors holding clubs

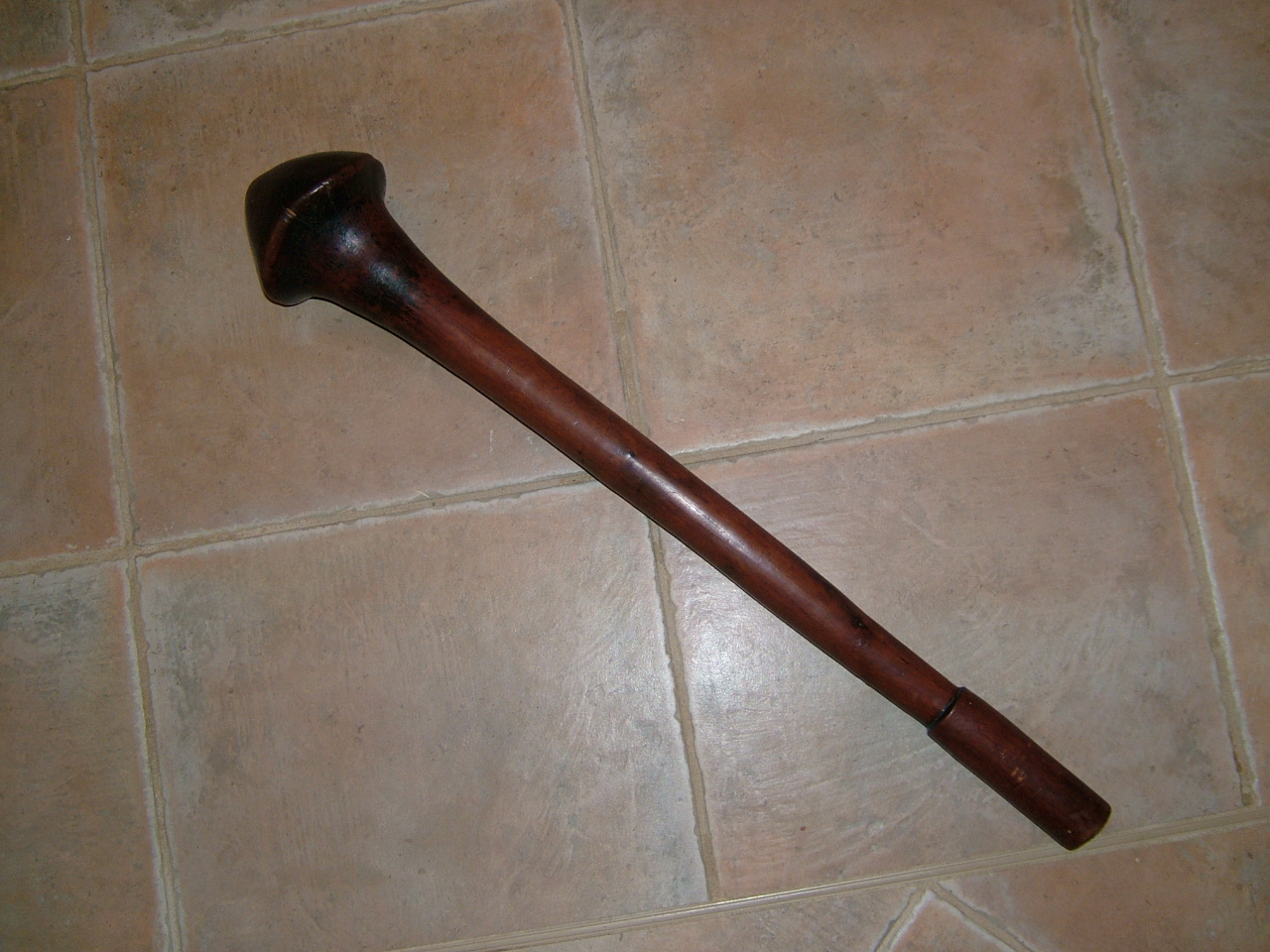
Kanak mace with fungus head

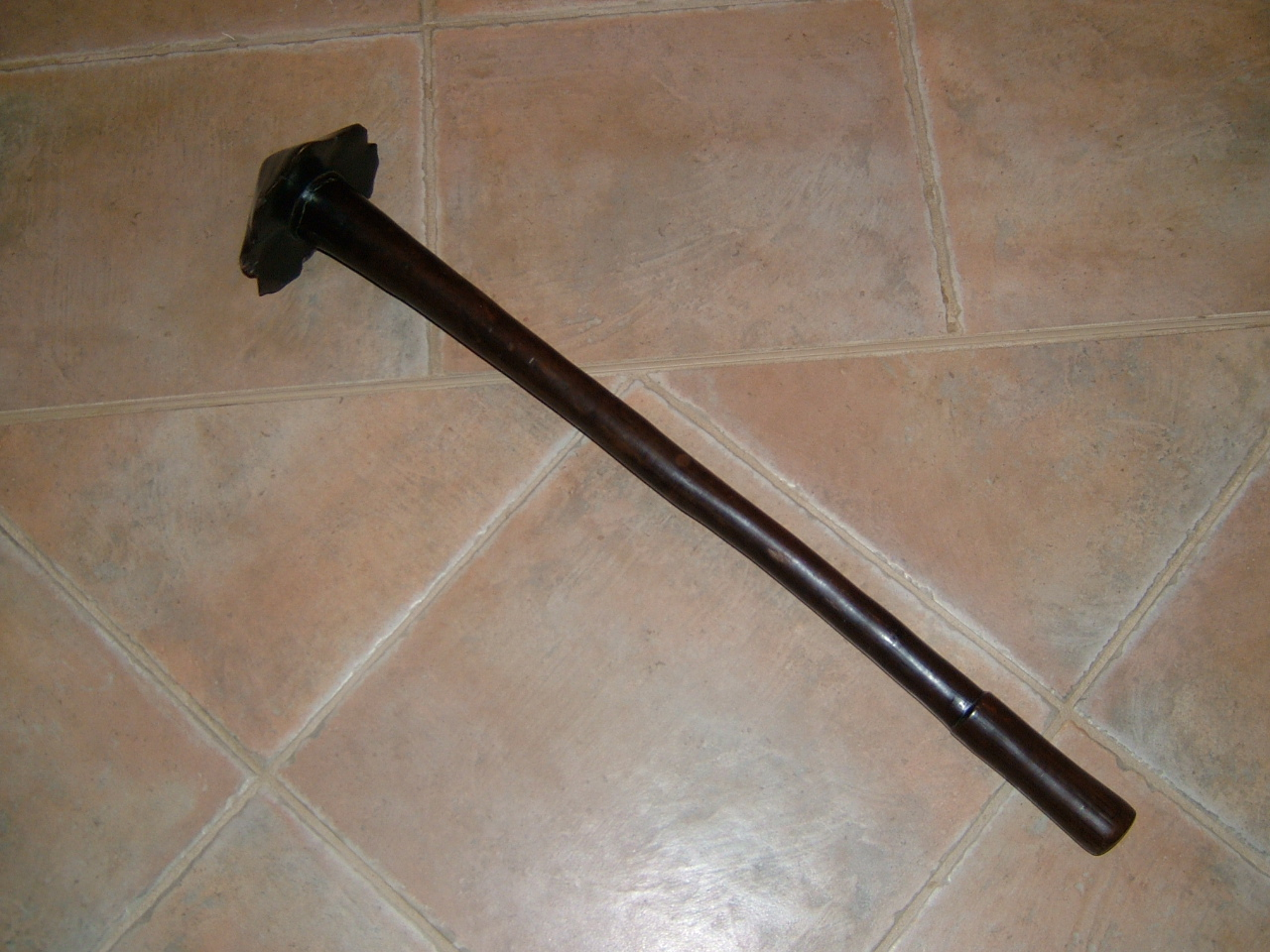
Kanak mace fungus type

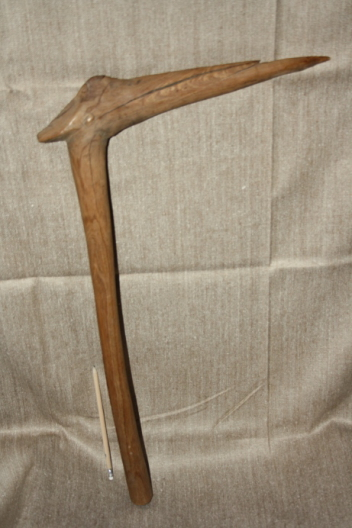
Bird's beak club

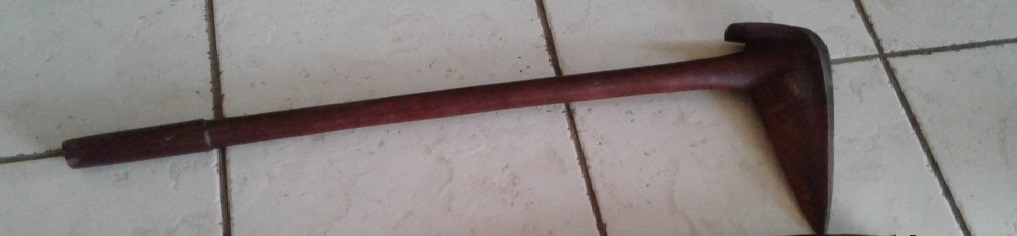
Kanak bird's beak club

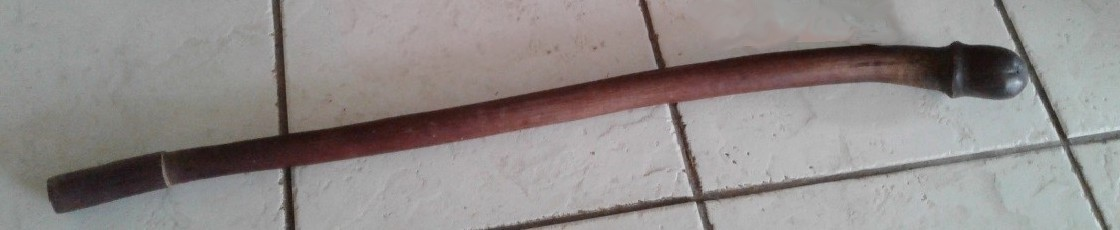
Phallic mace

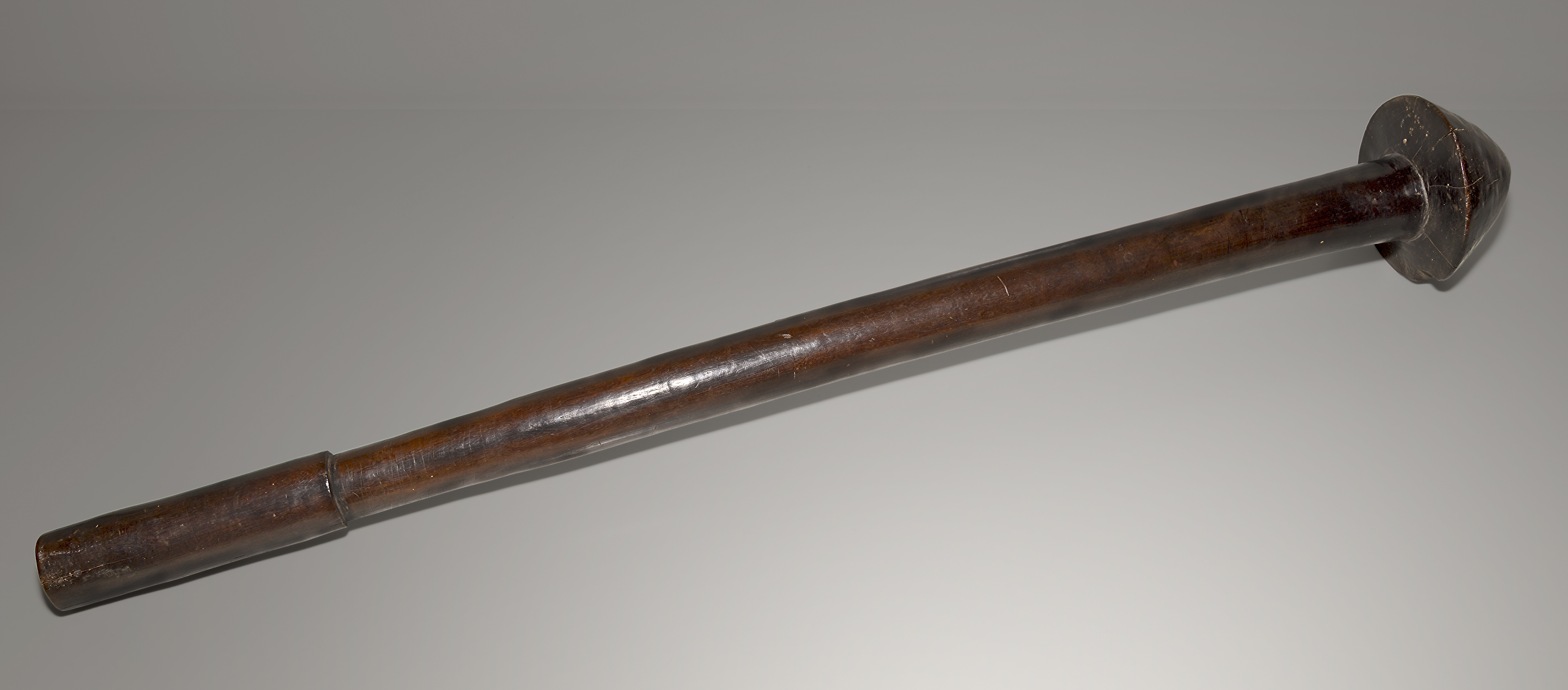
Kanak Mace

== See also ==
- Kanak
- Melanesia

== Bibliography ==
- John Charles Edler, Terence Barrow, Art of Polynesia, Hemmeter Publishing Corporation, 1990.
- Roger Boulay, Casse-Tête et Massues Kanak, 2015.
- Adrienne L. Kaeppler, Douglas Newton, Harry N. Abrams, Oceanic Art, 1997.
- Michael Gunn, William Teel, From the South Seas: Oceanic Art in the Teel Collection, Museum of Fine Arts, Boston, MFA Publications, 2006.
- André Breton, Arts primitifs, Camels Cohen, 2002.
- De jade et de nacre: patrimoine artistique kanak : Catalogue, Musée territorial de Nouvelle-Calédonie, Nouméa, mars-mai 1990, Musée national des arts africains et océaniens, Paris, octobre 1990-janvier 1991.
