= Kanak people =

Indigenous people of New Caledonia

Kanak
- The flag of the pro-independence political party and the cultural flag of the Kanak community, showing a flèche faîtière (a spear-like wooden totem monument placed atop traditional dwellings). It is used with the national flag of France to represent New Caledonia

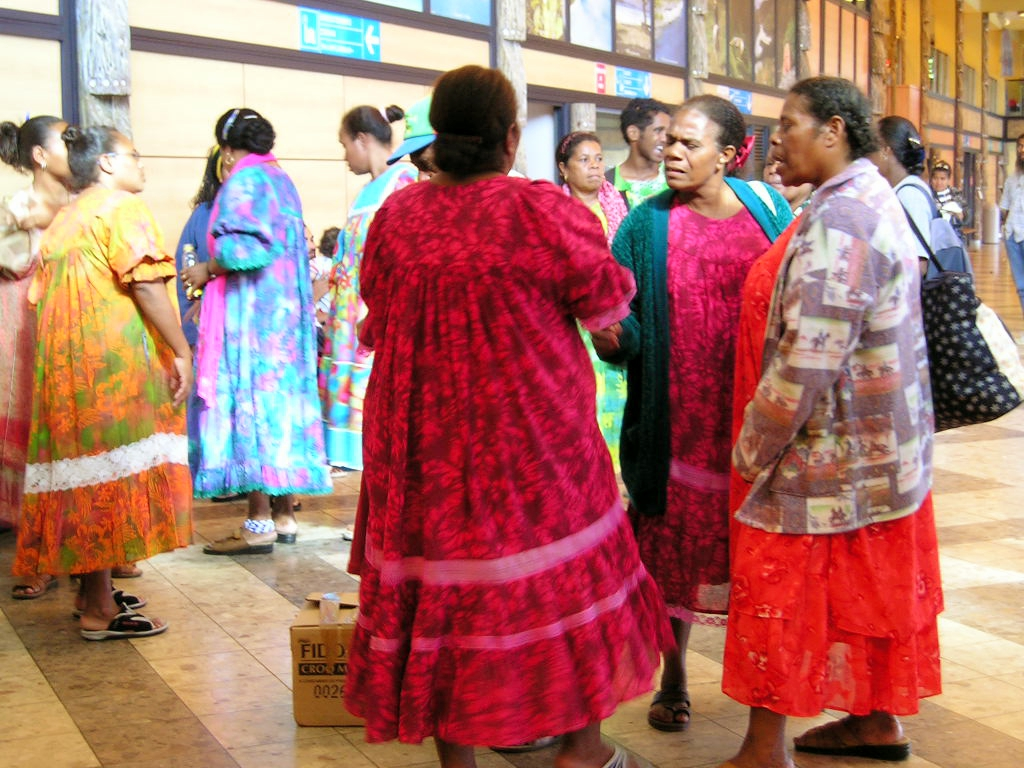
- Kanak women in New Caledonia

Total population
- 111,856+ (2019)

Regions with significant populations
- New Caledonia: 111,856
- Metropolitan France: A few thousand

Languages
- French • New Caledonian languages

The Kanaks (French spelling until 1984: Canaque) are the indigenous Melanesian inhabitants of New Caledonia, an overseas collectivity of France in the southwest Pacific. Kanak peoples traditionally speak diverse Austronesian languages that belong to the New Caledonian branch of Oceanic. According to the 2019 census, the Kanaks make up 41.2% of New Caledonia's total population – corresponding to around 112,000 people. The other populations are the Caldoche, who are European born in New Caledonia; the Zoreille, who were born in metropolitan France and live in New Caledonia, in addition to about 10% that are non-Kanak Polynesians and 10% that are mixed race.

The earliest traces of human settlement in New Caledonia go back to the Lapita culture, about 3000 BP, i.e. 1000 BCE. In addition, Polynesian seafarers have interbred with the Kanaks over the last centuries. New Caledonia was annexed to France in 1853, and became an overseas territory of France in 1956. An independence movement, which led to a failed revolt in 1967, was restarted in 1984, pursuing total independence from French rule. When the 1988 Matignon agreements were signed between the representatives of France and New Caledonia to decide on holding the referendum for independence, Jean-Marie Tjibaou, the Kanak leader of the independence movement, had mooted a proposal to set up an Agency for the Development of Kanak Culture (ADCK). After Tjibaou's assassination in 1989, the French President François Mitterrand ordered that a cultural centre on the lines suggested by Tjibaou be set up in Nouméa, the capital of New Caledonia; it was to be the last of Mitterrand's Grands Projets. The Jean-Marie Tjibaou Cultural Centre was formally established in May 1998.

Although ancient Lapita potteries date back to 1000 BC, and the people of the island have long been involved in the arts, since the establishment of the ADCK, Kanak arts and crafts have become more popular in New Caledonia. Wooden carvings in the shape of hawks, ancient gods, serpents and turtles are popular as is flèche faîtière, a carving which resembles a small totem pole with symbolic shapes. Music, dance and singing are part of many a Kanak ceremonial function and dances are performed during the traditional Kanak gatherings with the objective of cementing relationships within the clan and with ancestors.

== Etymology ==
The word Kanak (originally spelled Canaque in French) is derived from kanaka maoli, a Hawaiian phrase meaning 'ordinary person' which was at one time applied indiscriminately by European colonisers, traders and missionaries in Oceania to any non-European Pacific islander. Kanaka in Hawaiian descends from the Proto-Polynesian root *taŋata meaning 'person', a root which is not used in New Caledonian languages. Prior to European contact, there were no unified states in New Caledonia, and no single self-appellation used to refer to its inhabitants.

In 1984, Melanesian leaders adopted the modern spelling Kanak as a preferred alternative to the old spelling Canaque, which was associated with the colonial period. The new form "kanak" does not inflect grammatically in French: e.g. the plural is “les Kanak” (*les Kanaks is incorrect); “les traditions kanak”, etc.

Other words have been coined from Kanak in the past few generations:

- Kanaky is an ethno-political name for the island or the entire territory.
- Kaneka is a musical genre associated with the Kanak, stylistically a form of reggae with added flutes, percussion and harmonies. Kaneka often has political lyrics and is sung in Drehu, Paici or other Melanesian languages, or in French.

In German, the racial epithet Kanake — which is now applied to all non-whites, even southern Europeans in some cases, and especially to Turkish immigrants – also derives from the same source. It was originally applied to people from German colonial possessions in Oceania.

== History ==
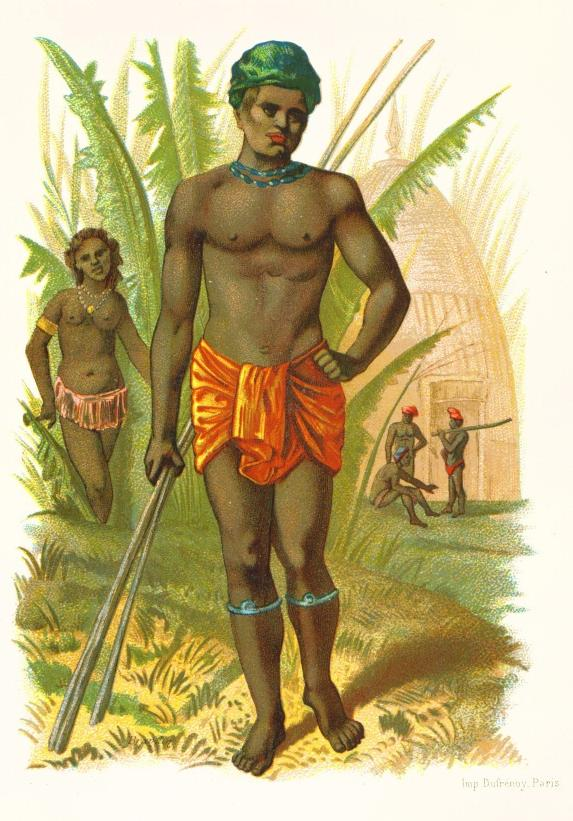
19th century lithograph of Kanaks

=== Origin ===
Melanesian settlement on Grande Terre dates back at least as far as the Lapita culture. The origin of Kanak people is unclear. Obsidian transported from New Guinea was found with the earliest New Caledonian Lapita pottery. In addition, some researchers have claimed there is evidence of New Caledonian human habitation dating from 3000 BC (predating Lapita culture by 1500 years), while others claim to have found pre-Lapita pottery. At the Fourth Lapita Conference, held in June 2000, in Canberra, Australia, the question was posed: "Is Lapita Kanak, or is Lapita the oldest and first ancestor of a later culture that is labelled Kanak?" Still another problem in determining the origin and early history of Kanak people is that the archaeological interpretation is in conflict with the views of Kanak people which have become politicized subsequent to colonial rule.

=== European settlers ===
The earliest history of Europeans arriving on these islands is when Captain James Cook of the Kingdom of Great Britain landed in 1774 at a time when there were reportedly 70,000 Kanaks living in the archipelago. Cook gave the name "New Caledonia" to these islands, named after Caledonia, the Latin name for Scotland.

Fifty years later, the Protestants of London Missionary Society came to New Caledonia, which was followed by entry of the French Catholics to the island, in 1843. This resulted in a conflict between the two religious factions and eventually the French Catholics' control of the islands prevailed. The island nation was thereafter annexed by France, in 1853.

During the colonial period, in the 19th century, Kanaks were employed as forced labour, to perform work in places such as Australia, New Zealand, Papua New Guinea, the U.S. state of California, Canada, Chile, Fiji and South Africa. During the 3,000 years that Kanaks lived in the remote islands, they were unprepared for the arrival of European viruses and bacteria. The Kanaks were uprooted from the land and were employed as forced labour on French plantations, ranches and public works.

=== Revolt ===
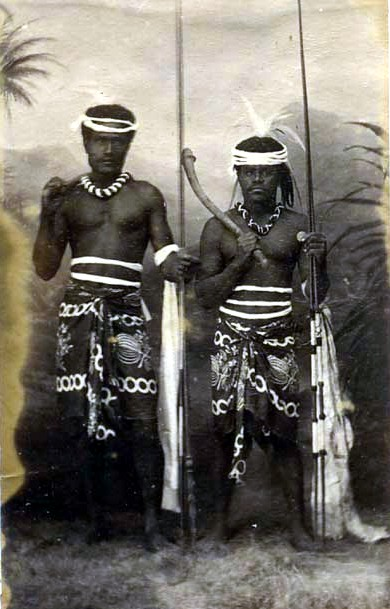
Kanak warriors, c. 1880

When Kanaks were forced to move to reserve areas of the island, closer to the mountains, they occupied only 10 per cent of the area of their ancestral territories given that their population had declined so dramatically due to disease, and their living conditions became very hard. This situation arose consequent to induction of 20,000 convicts by the French government between 1864 and 1897, most of whom settled permanently in the country, and who were employed to extract nickel (beginning with 1864) and copper from 1875 onwards. This caused serious resentment among the Kanaks who revolted in 1878 against the French colonial rule, which was suppressed by the French who were better armed. The Kanak leader was decapitated, and his head was put on display in the Museum of Natural History.

=== After World War II ===
After World War II, the Kanak independence movement again picked up momentum when the United Nations placed New Caledonia on its Decolonisation List of Non-Self-Governing Territories in 1946. A major progression occurred when Kanaks and French settlers in the country obtained voting rights in 1951, shortly before it became an overseas territory of France in 1956. The Kanaks were then also allowed to move out of their reserve areas. This was followed by the establishment of the Territorial Assembly in 1957, but this was short-lived; Charles de Gaulle abolished it after he became the President of France, in 1958.

=== Agitation for independence ===
In 1981 the movement for Independence began, following the murder of Pierre Declercq, the secretary general of the Caledonian Union (French: Union calédonienne, UC) on 19 September 1981. A national forum titled "Front de Liberation Nationale Kanak Socialiste" (FLNKS) was established in 1984. This forum refused to participate in elections to the Territorial Assembly and even declared its own Provincial Government; it met with opposition by the French. FLNKS "organized a boycott of the territorial elections in New Caledonia, smashing ballot boxes and setting up roadblocks to prevent people from voting." The FLNKS persisted with their agitation and unilaterally announced on 7 January 1985 that a referendum on independence would be conducted in July 1985. After the death of Kanak leader Eloi Machoro in 1985, Kanak activists took 27 gendarmes hostage on the island of Ouvéa, igniting a French response (see Ouvéa cave hostage taking).

The Kanak movement proposed a self-government in January 1986. An interim arrangement was announced by Mitterrand who moved to give greater autonomy in the colony. Prime Minister of France Jacques Chirac stationed troops in the islands and the autonomy issue was shelved. The FLNKS, backed in their campaign for a referendum by regional organizations such as the "Groupe du fer de lance mélanesien" (the Melanesian Spearhead Group), the Pacific Forum, and the Nonaligned Countries Movement, were successful in getting the UN Resolution 41-41 A of 2 December 1986 passed; it re-inscribed New Caledonia on the Decolonisation List of Non-Self-Governing Territories. But this resolution did not mitigate the violence as what ensued was more confrontations with the authorities: the "Ouvéa cave hostage taking" resulted in 21 deaths including 19 Kanaks. Following the battle, there was an international outcry that resulted in initiation of talks for settlement between the French government, the Kanaks and the French settlers.

=== Matignon Accord ===
An agreement called the Matignon Accord followed on 6 November 1988 between the French and the Kanaks, which had the majority support of 80% of the French people. According to the Matignon Accord (or Matignon Agreement) a referendum on independence was proposed to be held by 1998. Two Kanak leaders who signed the agreement, Jean-Marie Tjibaou and Yeiwene Yeiwene, were assassinated on 4 May 1989 by a Kanak activist. The Kanak independence activists were unhappy with the situation as they felt that France would never allow them independence.

=== Nouméa Accord ===
A subsequent agreement, the "Nouméa Accord", was signed between the FLNKS President and the French Government on 5 May 1998, allowing for a degree of autonomy to New Caledonia over a transition period of up to 20 years. A referendum for independence from France was held in 2018. Progressive changes that were expected of this agreement were in the local political control and structure; the Kanaks would have greater say over internal and regional affairs while France would retain sovereign rights including control over military and foreign affairs. In a speech made before the Fourth Commission of the United Nations on 10 October 2005, the FLNKS Vice President, Léopold Jorédié, urged the UN "to establish a monitoring and follow-up system for the previous contracts signed between multinationals and municipalities, by drawing on the initiatives of Global Witness and asking the UN to put in place an ad hoc commission in order to protect the wealth of New Caledonia, following the example of what was done for Congo."

=== Present status ===
The Caledonian Union, one of the political parties within the pro-independence FLNKS group had, in 2010, appealed for a national committee to evaluate progress and prepare New Caledonia for the change in leadership before the planned referendum in 2014. In this appeal, the UC also argued that, according to the Nouméa Accord, it was obligatory for the French government to train and build the capacity of Kanaks to be able to take over the government in 2014 and urged them to respond swiftly. In reality the referendum was delayed until 2018 and its result was to remain with France, by a 56% majority. Two repeat referendums were held in 2020, and 2021, in which voters rejected independence. However, the latter referendum was boycotted by pro-independence Kanaks, leading to a highly skewed result.

In May 2024, the French government moved to allow all French citizens the right to vote in New Caledonia after 10 years of residence there. This caused a widespread series of protests led by pro-independence Kanaks, and eventual rioting and looting. By late October, eleven Kanaks and two French police officers had died, while 169 people had been wounded and 2658 arrested. The French state was criticised for its repressive response to the protests.

== Population ==
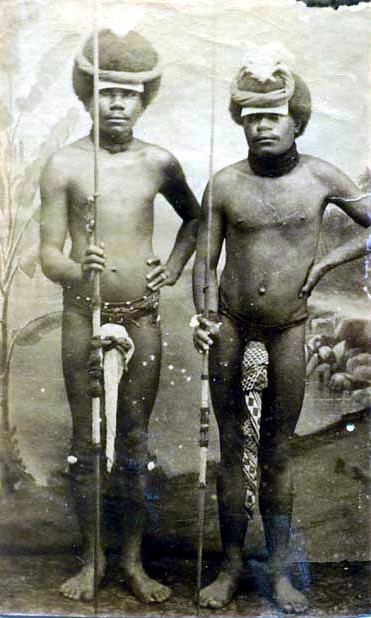
Two Kanak warriors posing with penis gourds and spears

=== Demographics ===
New Caledonia or Territoire des Nouvelle-Caledonie et Dependances, is approximately 1,200 kilometres (750 mi) off the northeast coast of Australia. Of its 500 islands, the five main ones are inhabited, are spread across an area 30 miles (48 km) wide and over 250 miles (400 km) in length. As of 2009, the Melanesian Kanak people constituted 40.3% (99,078) of the population of 245,580 in New Caledonia. The other groups consist of Europeans (mostly French) at 29%, Wallisian 9%, people of mixed ancestry (8%), and other groups including Polynesians, Indonesians, Vietnamese and those (believed to be chiefly of European ancestry) who identified simply as "Caledonian." In 1774, Cook landed in Balade and estimated a population of around 50,000 for the whole island. A minimum of 100,000 is more likely, considering the amount of land that can be shown to have been cultivated pre-colonially. This declined to 27,000 during early colonial rule as a result of disease. Kanaks were historically associated with tribes, including the Bwaarhat, Tiendanite, Goa, and Goosana, as well as clans, such as the Poowe.

=== Languages ===
"Most of them are spoken, and because they are taught at school, some of them need to have a standard to be written; the academy can also produce new texts for the teaching of the languages."

— Jacques Vernaudon, University of New Caledonia linguistics lecturer, 2007

The languages of New Caledonia are very diverse, with French serving as a lingua franca and the official language of New Caledonia. Glottolog recognizes 33 Kanak languages in the island nation, many with distinct dialects. Approximately 60,000 residents of New Caledonia speak at least one of the Kanak languages. The Kanak language with the most speakers is Drehu.

With the only exception of Fagauvea — which is a Polynesian language spoken on the Loyalty Island of Ouvéa — all Kanak languages belong to the New Caledonian subgroup of Oceanic (itself a branch of the Austronesian phylum). In spite of their shared origin, Kanak languages historically diversified so much as to become mutually unintelligible.

New Caledonian languages are divided into several groups. The Northern language group includes 12 languages: Caac, Cemuhî, Fwâi, Jawe, Kumak, Nemi, Paicî, Pije, Pwaamei, Pwapwa, Yalayu, and Yuaga. Five languages have developed lexical tones: Cèmuhî and Paicî from the northern group, and three languages (Drubea, Numèè, Kwenyii) from the Far South. Most of these languages are only used in spoken form.

Kanak leader Tjibaou was involved in the establishment of the Écoles populaires kanak, which used local Kanak languages as medium of instruction for spiritual and practical knowledge, while including French and English language classes. Since 2006, pre-school children have been given the opportunity to learn indigenous Kanak languages. While the Kanak languages have been taught in high schools across the Loyalty Islands and North Province, the language education has not been as common in the more European South Province. The establishment of the Kanak Language Academy (KLA) was a provision of the Nouméa Accord.

== Culture ==
=== Traditional beliefs and religion ===
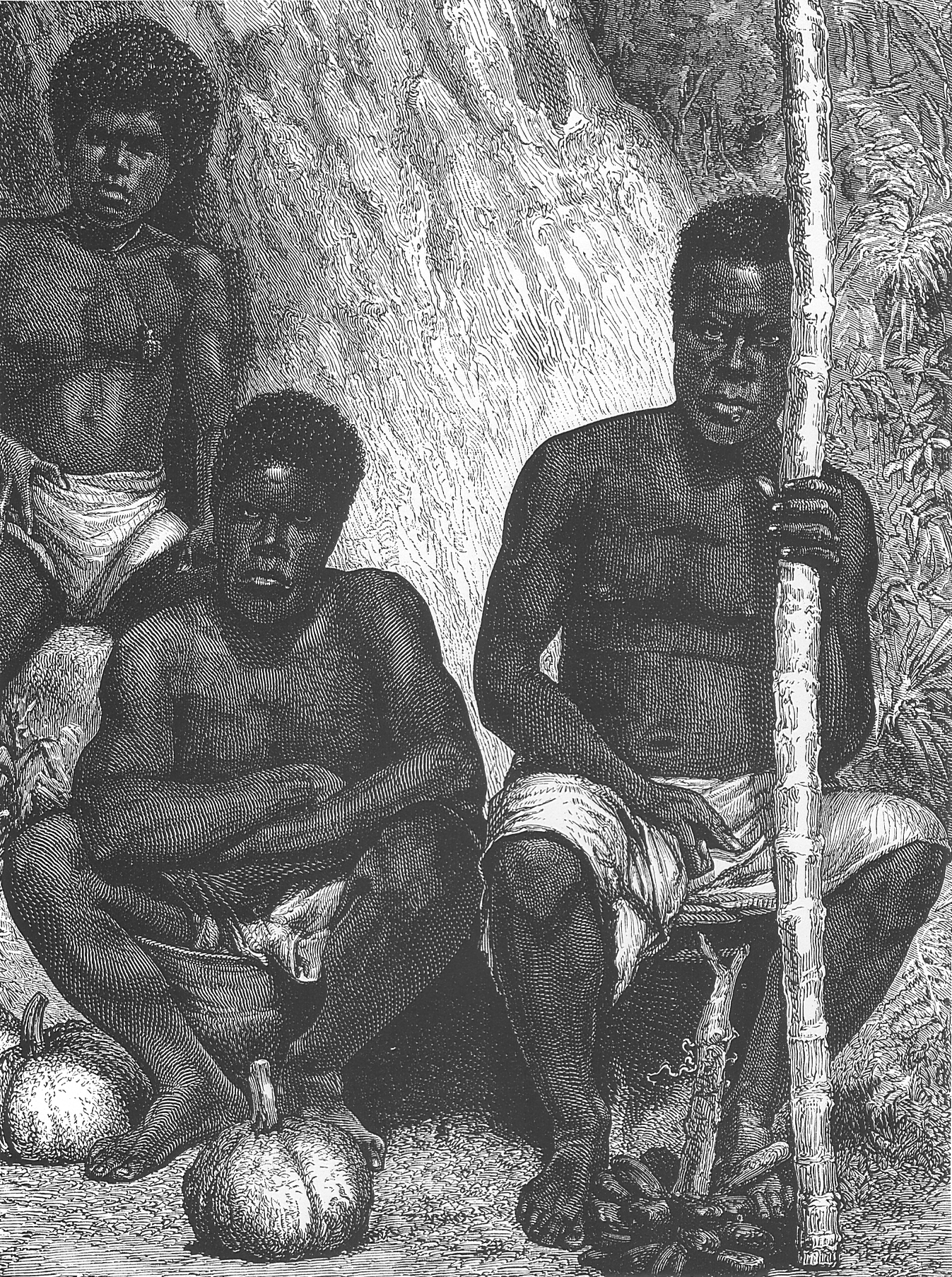
Kanaks, c. 1880

The Kanaks were known to worship their ancestors. This worship was embodied in the sepulchre, sacred stones, and devotional hearths where they offered sacrifices. Today, most Kanaks are Christians. Religion is an important aspect of Kanak culture. The Catholic church in Nouméa is attended by Kanaks, who form nearly 50% of the population of Catholics in New Caledonia (next only to the Europeans). Also, the majority of Protestants are Kanaks. Some Kanaks follow traditional beliefs.

According to the traditional beliefs of the Kanak people, the sea is sacred as it provides them with "fish for food", so they treat it with great reverence. The folk stories created by the Kanak people attest to this fact and are also strictly followed as unwritten laws. Some of the important aspects of the oral laws relate to environmental protection and conservation, such as the closure of fishing operations when the fish stocks are on the decline, and fishing rights in certain areas are strictly observed with respect to locals.

=== Conservation ===
Following these beliefs and traditions, Kanak people and Conservation International (CI) have been jointly involved in conserving the ancestral waters and natural resources. According to a rapid assessment survey conducted with help from the Kanaks, 42 coral reefs have been identified for protection near Nord's Mont Pani Province. Its rich biodiversity reserves also include sea cucumbers, molluscs, crustaceans, herrings, groupers, and snappers. Supporting Kanak traditions, the Coral Reef Initiative for the South Pacific's (CRISP) partnership with CI provided recommendations and underwater species guides to the Kanak people. In 2004, a proposal was put forward to promote the entire coastal region as a World Heritage Site. Further work on this initiative has been pursued by CI's Center for Applied Biodiversity Science, the Coral Reef Initiative for the South Pacific (CRISP), and the French Government, in collaboration with WWF to assess marine resources used by both Kanak tribes and people of European descent across three coastlines of the Nord Province.

=== Traditional housing ===
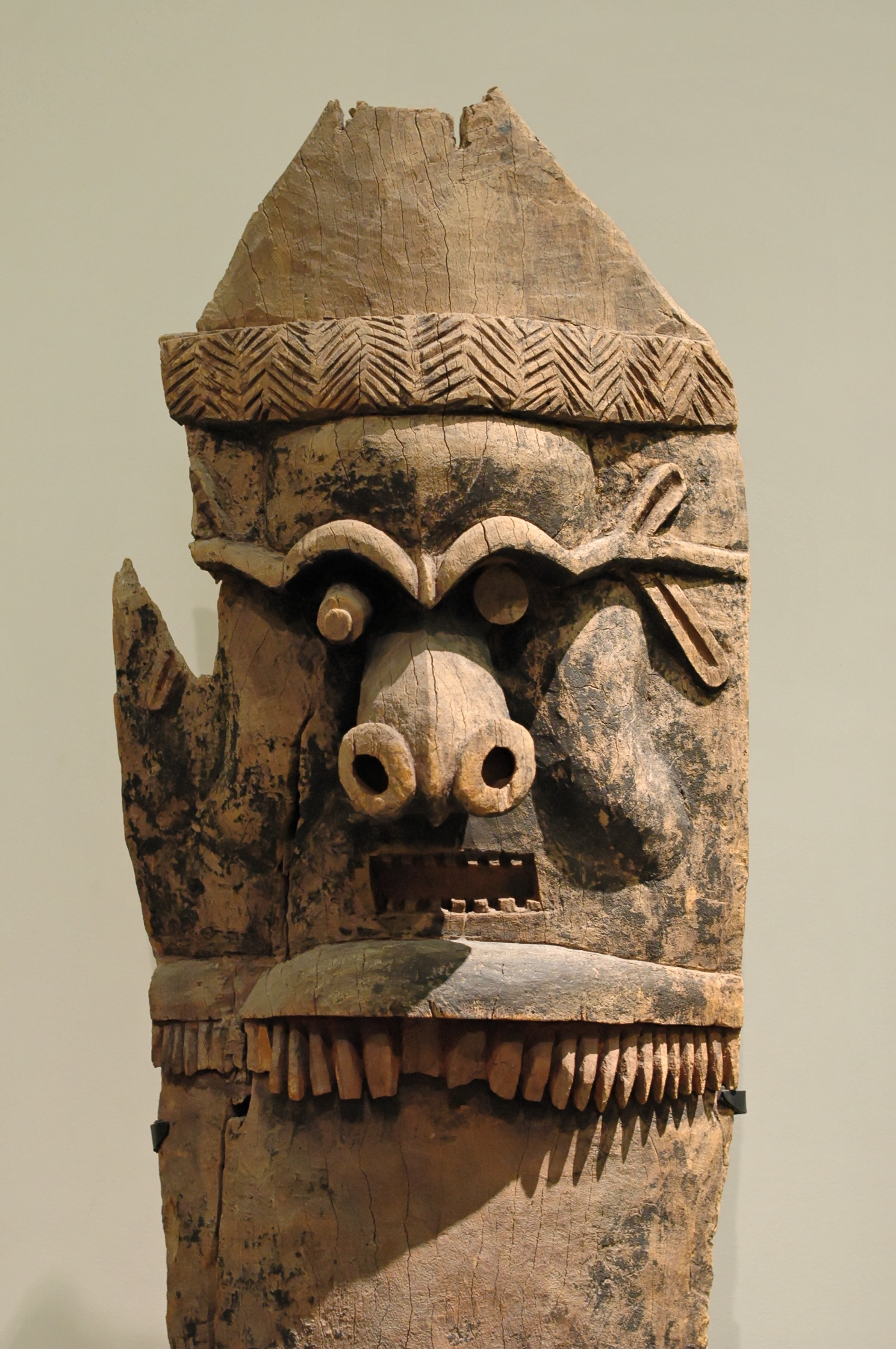
Kanak doorpost (detail) for a large ceremonial house, Kanak sculpture. Houp wood.

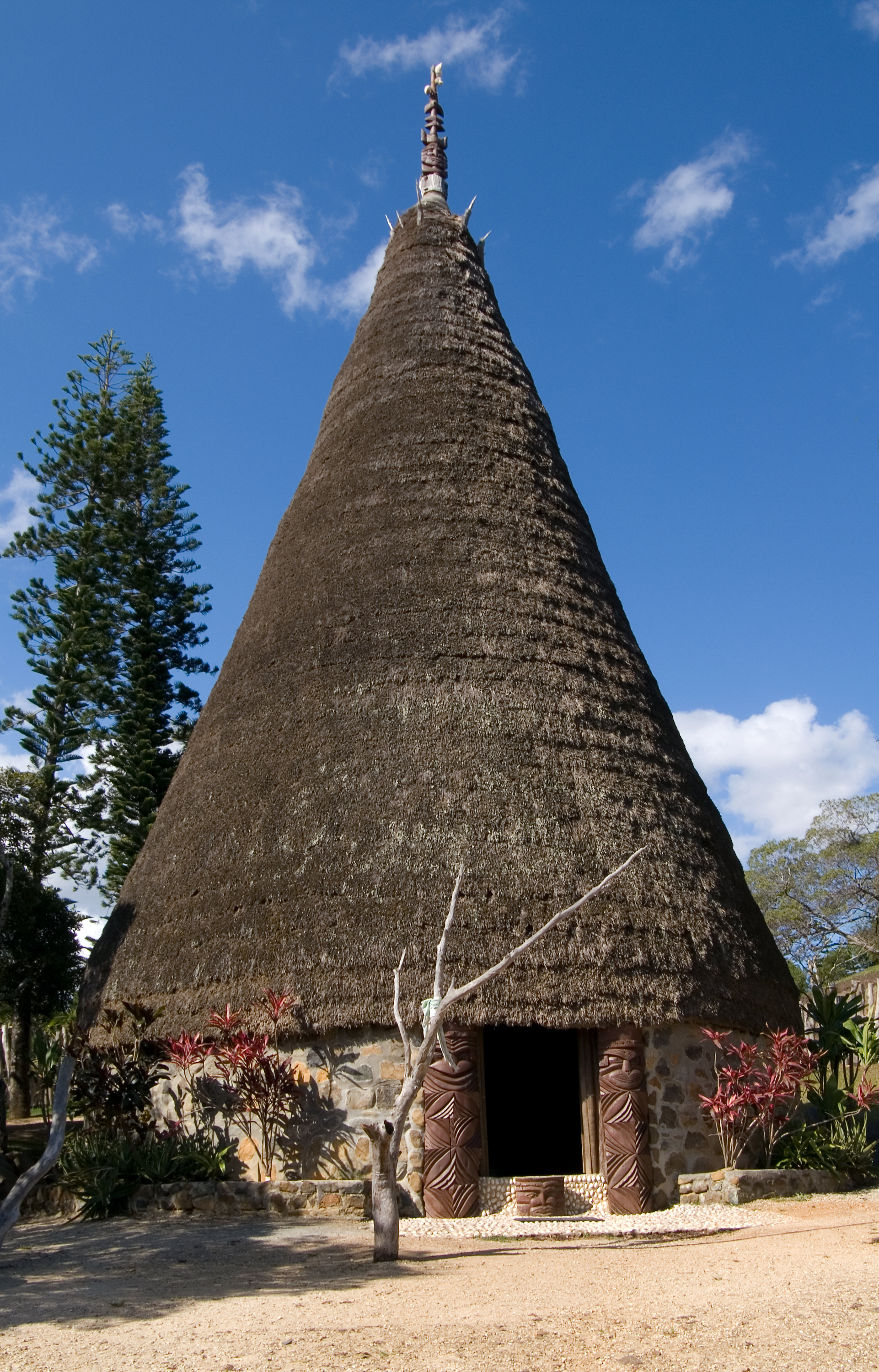
Kanak Great House with flèche faîtière (roof finial).

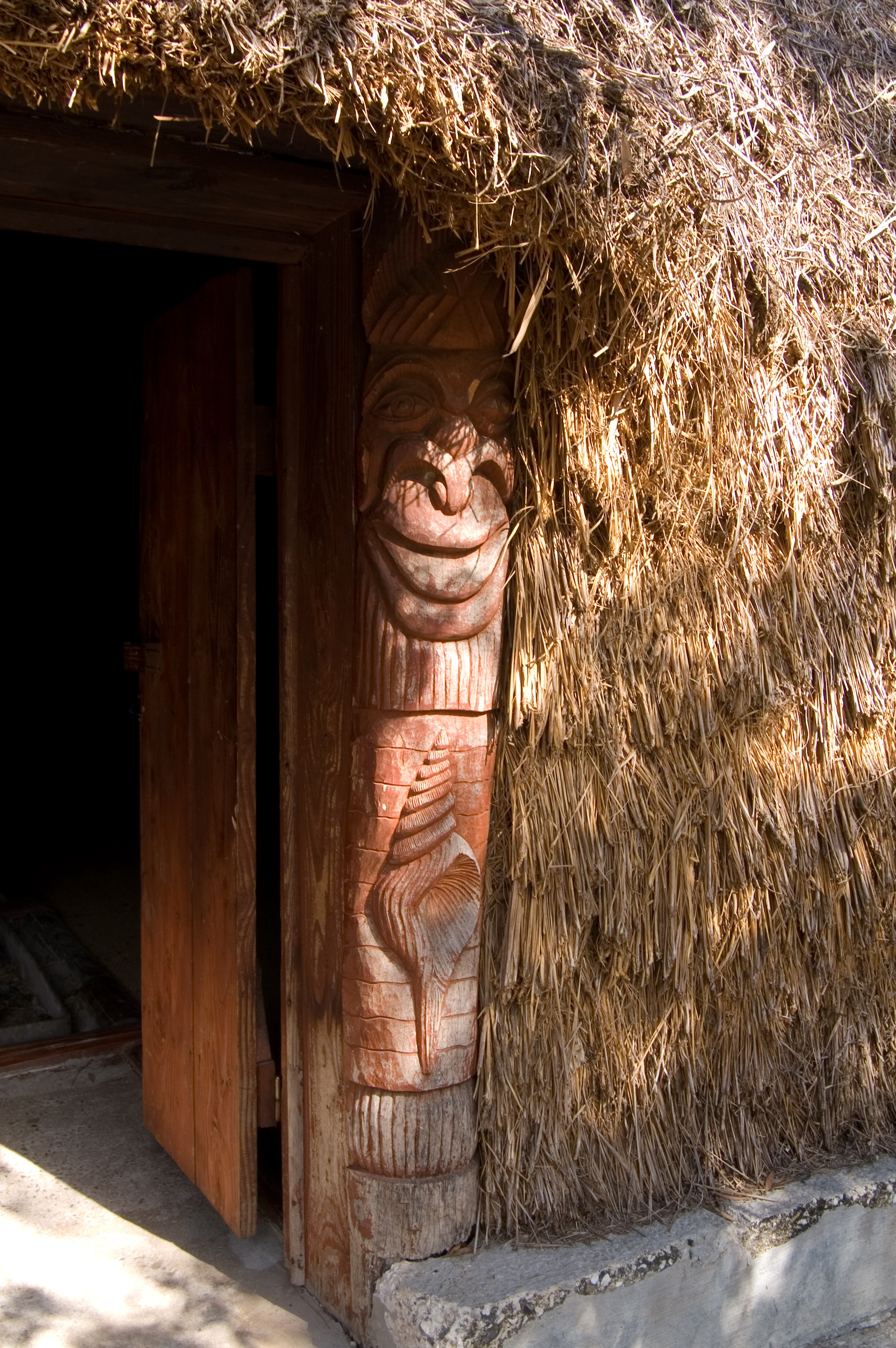
Kanak house detail.

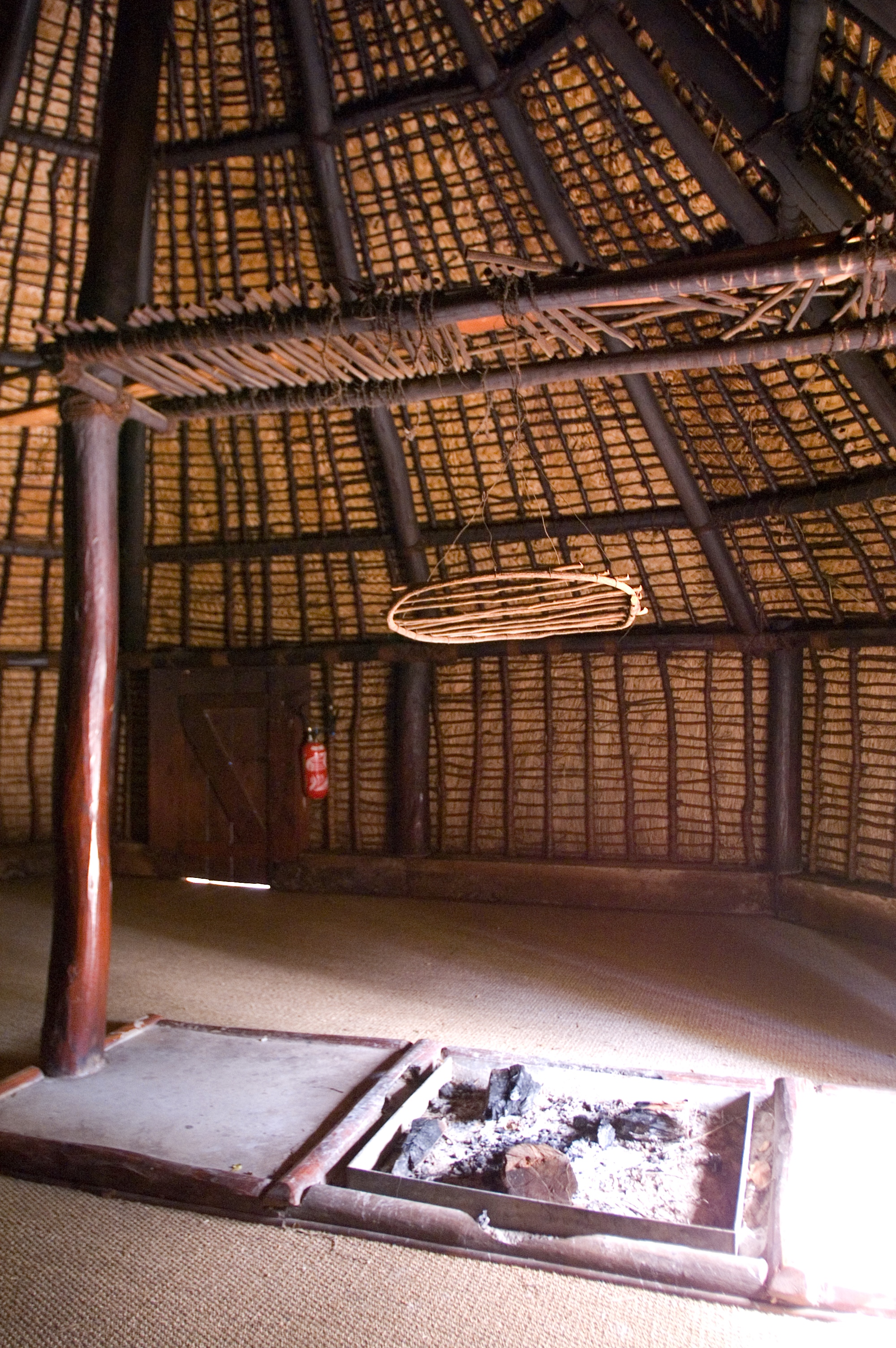
Inner view of a Kanak hut with a hearth.

Elements of traditional Kanak huts displayed at the Jean-Marie Tjibaou Cultural Centre, Nouméa.

=== Cuisine ===
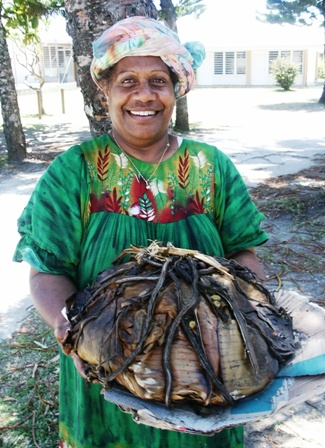
A Kanak woman with bougna, a casserole of fruit and fish baked in a ground oven.

Bougna is a traditional Kanak casserole, considered a national food by many Kanaks. It is made of sliced root vegetables which might include taro, manioc, yams and coconut milk. Pork, chicken or seafood may be used in the filling which is then wrapped in poingo banana leaves before being cooked over hot stones in an earthen oven. Other local ingredients used in Kanak cuisine include Rousettus (flying foxes) and local deer; marine staples such as lagoon and coral reef fish (including dawa), as well as crabs and lobsters. Paita beans are locally grown haricots, while custard-apple, lime and saffron are other local ingredients.

=== Fine arts ===
The Kanak arts of sculpture, dance, music and theatre have become more popular since the 1990s with the efforts of the Agency for Development of Kanak Culture ADCK Art forms in Kanak culture comprise:

Lapita pottery

The ancient Lapita potteries date to 1000 BC. Essentially a women's craft, the pottery is generally decorated with geometric patterns and stylised human faces, although there is variation between northern and southern New Caledonian pottery. The various handles and glazes have pinhole-incised designs made from tooth combs. The pottery was made from clay deposits found in the islands.

Paintings

Painting is a recent art form common among women artists. Famous artists include Yvette Bouquet from Koumac who has produced paintings with Pacific and Oceania themes, Paula Boi, whose paintings are of more abstract scenes, and Denise Tuvouane and Maryline Thydjepache who use mixed art forms. Bus stop shelters are common places where their paintings are illustrated.

Wood sculpture

Wood sculpture represents the spirit of Kanak culture of which the Flèche faîtière, which resembles a small totem pole with symbolic shapes, is the most common. A mini Stonehenge-looking religious memorial near the village in L'Île-des-Pins has a display of religious carvings. Other wooden objects include war clubs carved from the strongest wood, made in the form of a phallic head (casse-tete), a lethal bird's beak club (bec d'oiseau), and spears made from niaouli trees used to burn enemy houses.

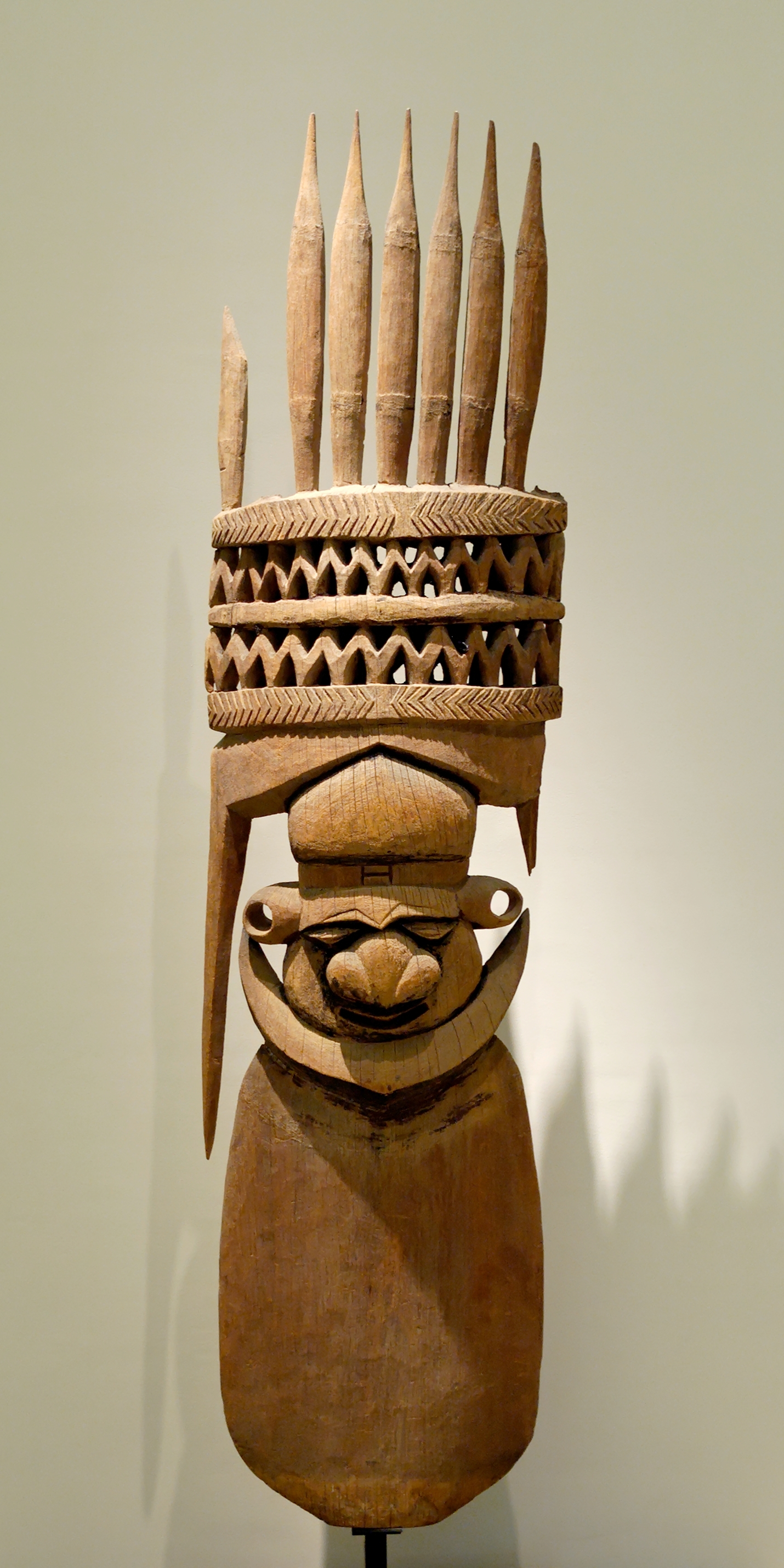
Fragment of a roof finial of a large clan house, sculpture of the Kanak people made of Houp wood, New Caledonia, late 14th century—early 15th century

Wooden carvings in the shape of hawks, ancient gods, serpents and turtles are also popular. The Grand Huts, also known as grande case (chief's hut), are decorated with the filial of fleche faitiere representing the ancestral spirits, symbolic of transition between the world of the dead and the world of the living. The wood carving is shaped like the spear-like carving that adorns the top of the grande case. It comprises three parts; the flat crowned face representing the ancestor with a long, the rounded pole run through by conch shells mounted on it that represents the ancestor's voice, and a base with the pole fixed to it to symbolise the link between the clan and the chief. The central piece is also flanked by wooden pieces with sharp points (facing downwards) that are intended to prevent bad spirits enveloping the ancestor in the central part. As it represented the power of the chiefs over their subjects, it was adopted as flag of the Kanaks by the organization leading the independent movement in New Caledonia. The arrow or the spear normally has a needle at the end to insert threaded shells from bottom to top. After the death of a Kanak chief, the fleche faitière is removed and his family takes it to their home. Though it was allowed to be used again as a sign of respect it is normally kept at burial grounds of noted citizens or at the mounds of abandoned grand houses.

Stone carving

Stone carvings made of jade or serpentinite are in the form of ceremonial axe representing clan's strength and power. These were used to behead enemies during war and during ancestor celebrations known as Pilou. The bottom of the handle represents the particular clan and is embellished with stones and shells. The axe is polished smooth like a disc. Carvings made of soapstone are also popular.

Bamboo carvings

A meter in length canes, dated between 1850 and 1920, are used to make an entry into a village or in dance ceremonies. The canes were fired to give black patina over the engraved parts; the engraving designs consist of geometrical real images from the pilou dance, agricultural motifs and village scenes of fishing or building a Grand Hut or case. These were also stuffed with magic herbs to ward off evil spirits.

Tapa

Tapa is a bark cloth made into small pieces, often from banyan trees used to wrap up Kanak ancient bead money.

Boats

Kanaks living on the islands made canoes out of hollowed–out trunks and large double–hulled outriggers with triangular sails, known as pirogues, traditionally used for fishing.

=== Dances ===
Dances are performed during the traditional Kanak gatherings with the objective of cementing relationships within the clan and with ancestors. Dance is performed in the form of a message or a legend, often related to their daily activities or important events such as birth, marriage, circumcision, the death of a chief and so forth. Dancers paint themselves colourfully to please the ancestors watching over them. Wooden masks made of local materials such as bark, feathers and leaves adorn them representing a physical link with the invisible world.

The Festival des Arts du Pacifique, the Festival of Pacific Arts, is organized every four years. Dancers are trained in traditional dances in special workshops. Welcome dances performed by groups are very popular. Of the various dance forms, the pilou-pilou dance is a unique dance form of the Kanaks, which recounts many stories of the clans. The pilou-pilou dance form of the Kanaks, now almost extinct, was so named by the early French missionaries of New Caledonia and involved stomping with bamboo tubes and beating of bark-clappers accompanied by singing in duets with shrieks and whistles of hundreds of dancers. In view of very strong nature of this form of dance, with a trance-like status attained by the dancers, these have been banned; the last such dance reported was in 1951.

=== Music and oral literature ===
Music, dance and singing are part of many a Kanak ceremonial function such as initiation, courting and mourning. Conch shells are blown by an appointed person to represent a clan chief's arrival or the voice of an ancestor. Rhythm instruments used include Bwanjep, used during ceremonies by a group of men; Jew's harp, (wadohnu in the Nengone language where it originated) made of dried piece of coconut palm leaf held between the teeth and an attached segment of soft nerve leaf; coconut-leaf whizzer, a piece of coconut leaf attached to a string and twirled that produces a noise like a humming bee; oboe, made of hollow grass stems or bamboo; end-blown flute, made of 50 cm long hollowed pawpaw leaf stem; bamboo stamping tubes that are struck vertically against the ground and played at major events; percussion instruments (hitting sticks, palm sheaths); rattles that are worn on the legs made of coconut leaves, shells and certain fruits. Kanak groups such as Bethela first made the recordings on cassette around 1975 or 1976.

Coming from an oral tradition, Kanak knowledge was traditionally passed through poems, legends, and stories. Children's oral history is provided by parents and other relatives who also use tickling and onomatopoeic noise to hold the child's attention. Some of the notable Kanak authors include Jean-Marie Tjibaou who wrote La Présence Kanak; Susanna Ounei-Small, a Kanak author from Ouvéa who wrote about the Matignon Accords; and Kaloombat Tein, author of Hwanfalik – Sayings from the Hienghene Valley which provides insight into Hienghène legends and is written in Hienghène, with English language translation.

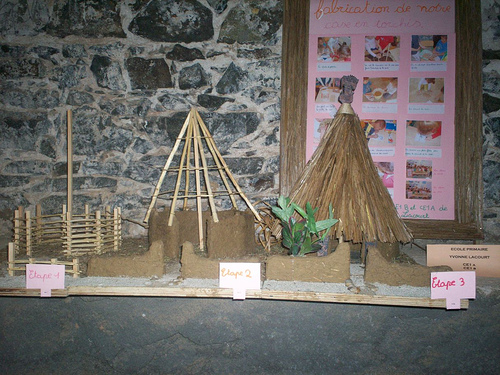
Exhibit of stages of construction of a Kanak hut

=== Art festivals ===
In 1971 the women's association, Smiling Melanesian Village Women's Groups(Mouvement pour un Souriant Village Melanesian) was formed and advocated the idea of a cultural festival to promote Kanak arts. As a result of this movement the first festival of Melanesian arts, "Melanesia 2000", was held in Nouméa in September 1975, supported by Jean-Marie Tjibaou. Kanak arts festivals became popular with two international events held early in the 1990s that created the awareness of Kanak arts. The first exhibition of modern-day wood sculptors and painters was held at Ko i Neva, which was also published as contemporary Kanak arts. This was followed by a large exhibition of Kanak arts in Paris known as "De Jade et de Nacre – Patrimoine Artistique Kanak (Jade and Mother of Pearl – Kanak Artistic Heritage".

The Centre Cultural Tjibaou also stages occasional art exhibitions. A popular quadrennial event is the Festival of Pacific Arts where the indigenous people of all Pacific nations and people gather to display the Pacific's cultural heritage.

== Contemporary issues ==
=== Crime ===
Kanak people are highly overrepresented in crime statistics. As of 2025, approximately 90% of prisoners at the Camp Est prison in Nouméa were Kanak, despite making up only 41.2% of the New Caledonian population as of the 2019 census.

== Gallery ==
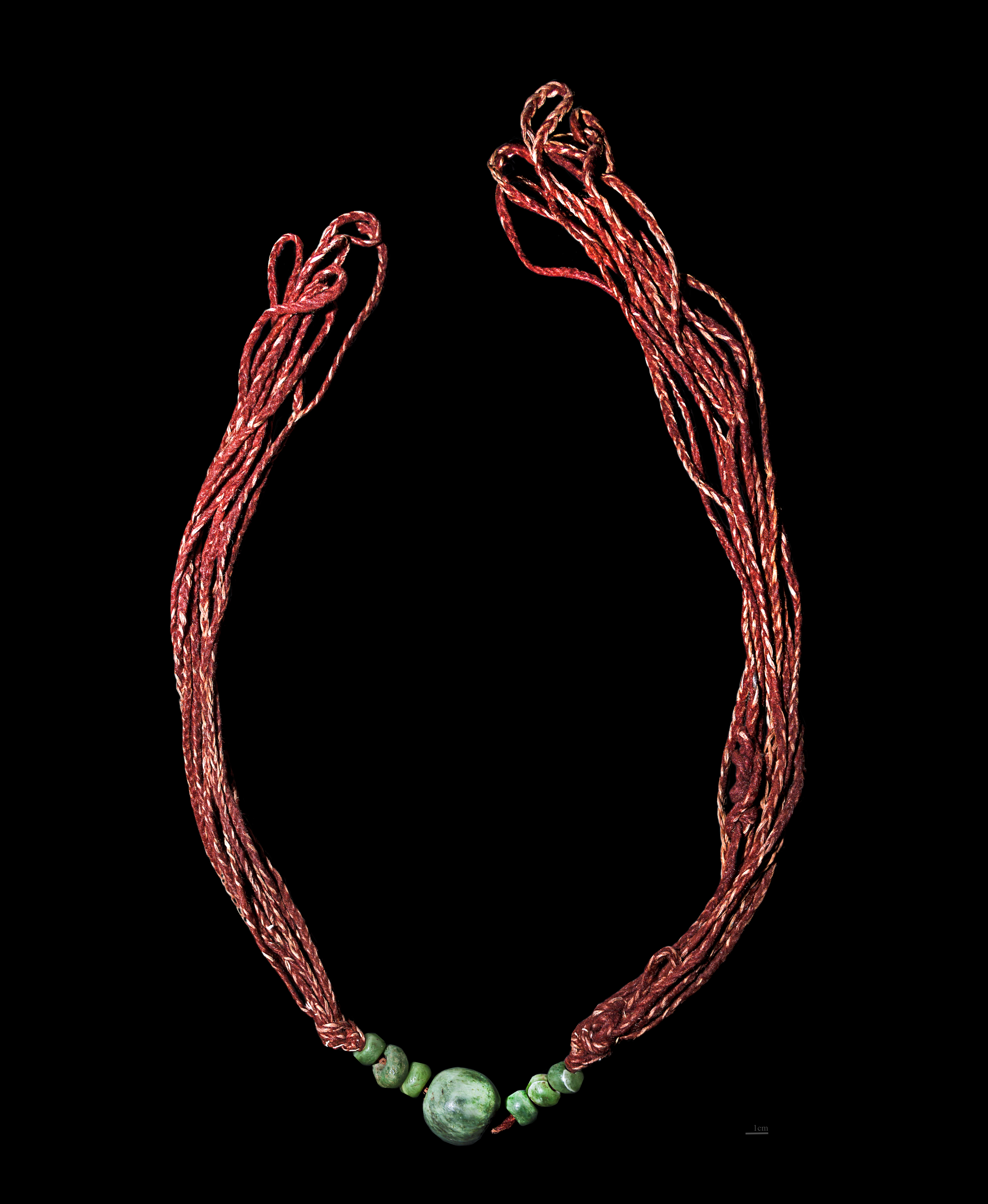
Kanak necklace, in flying fox hair cords

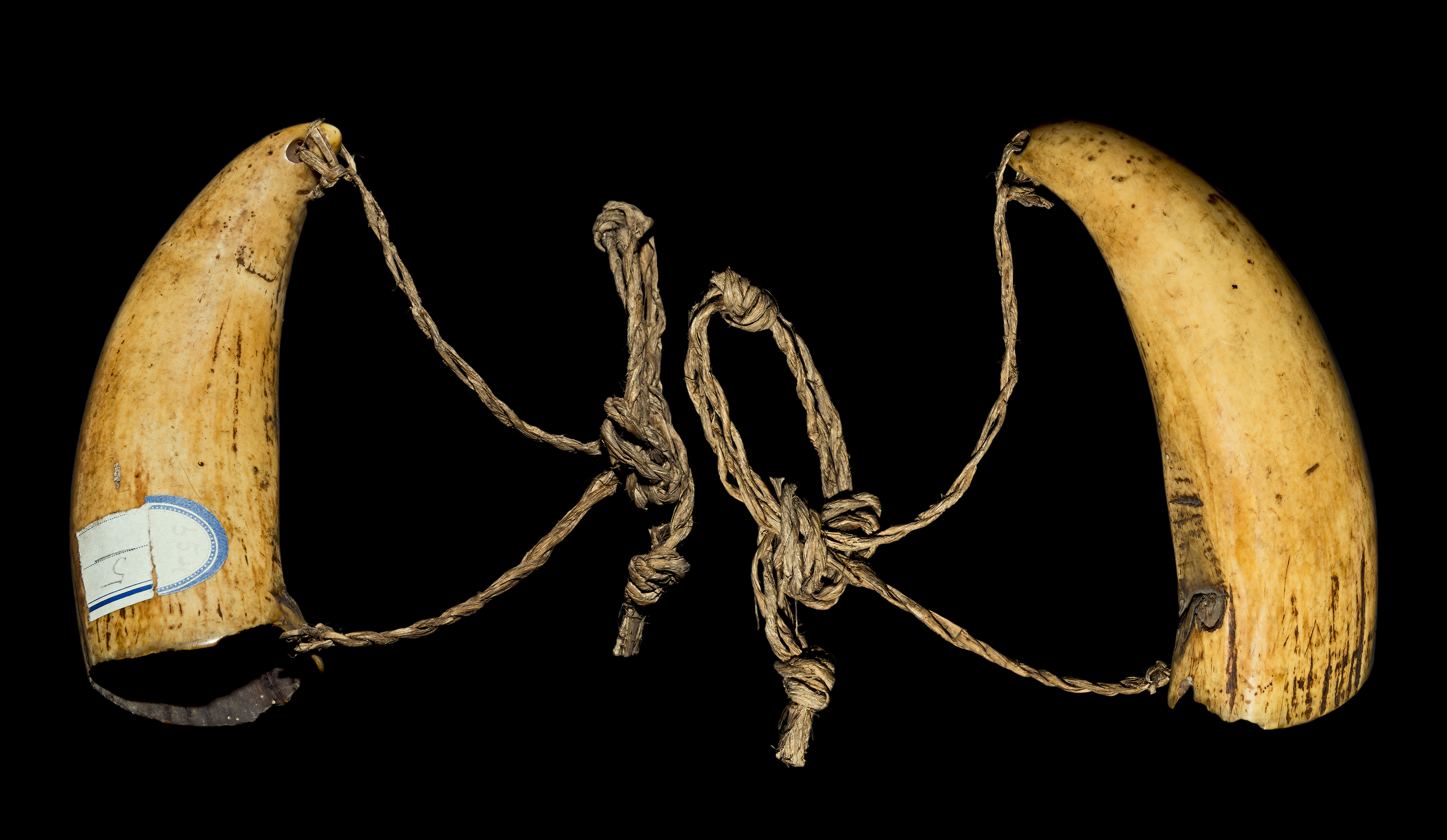
Sperm whale tooth, New Caledonia, nineteenth century

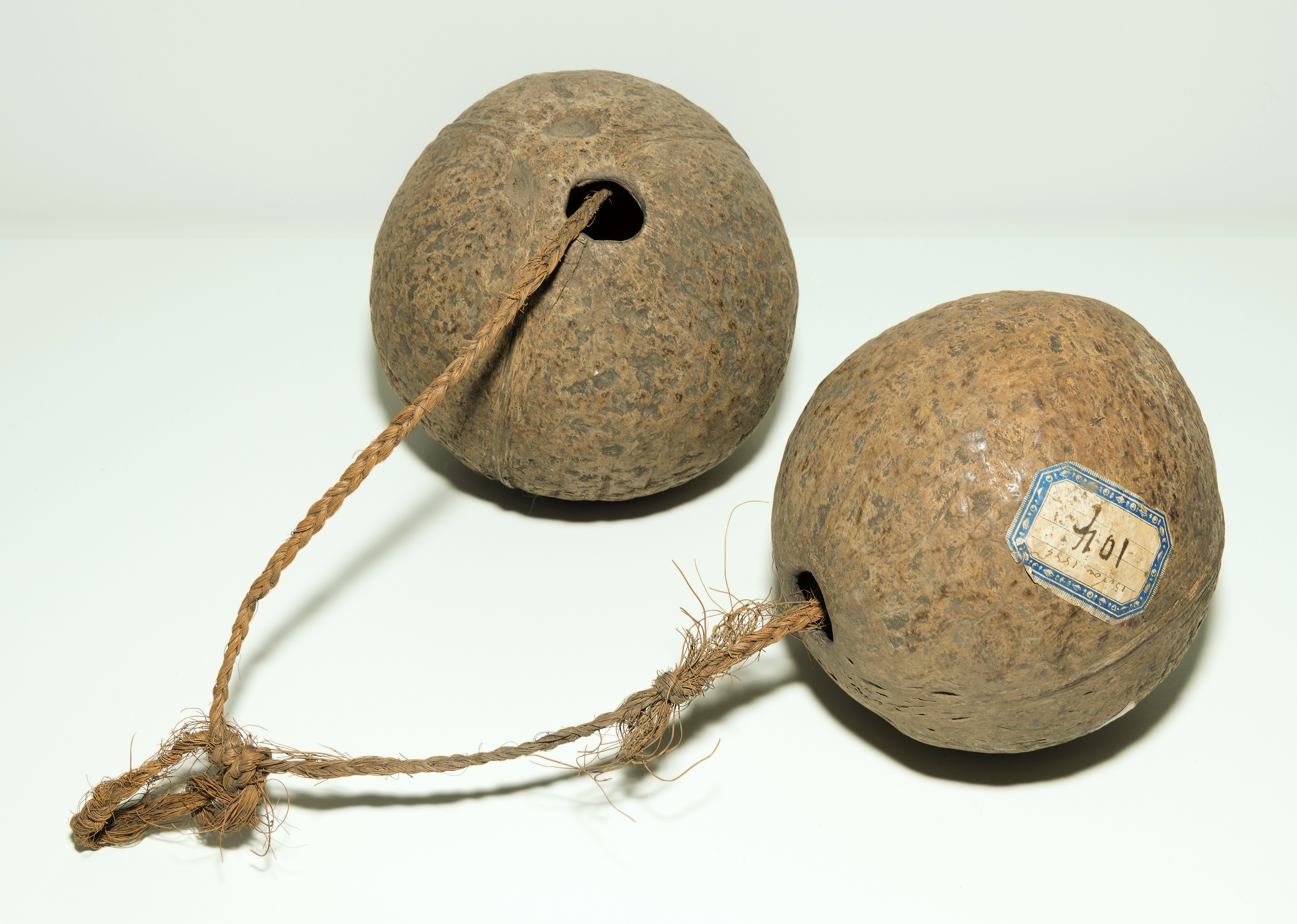
Kanak canteen

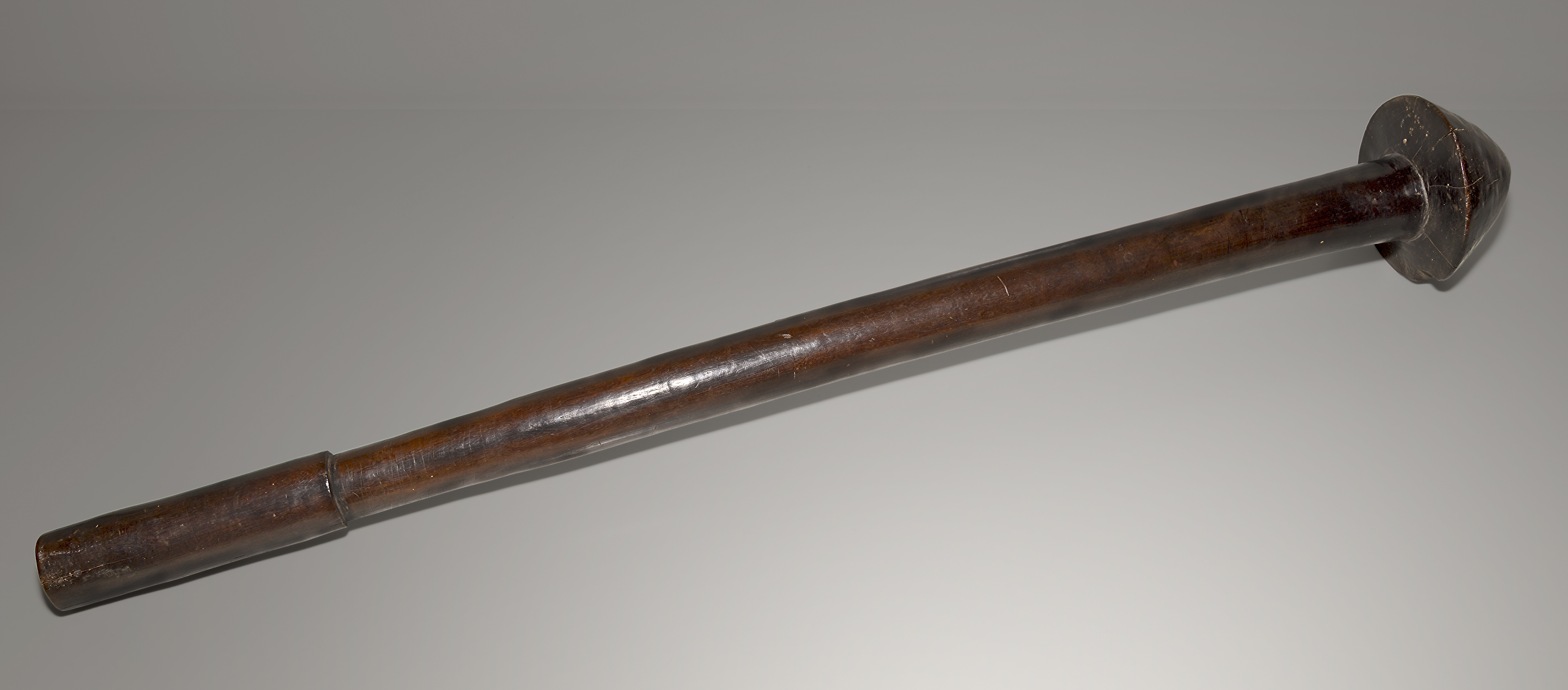
Kanak mace

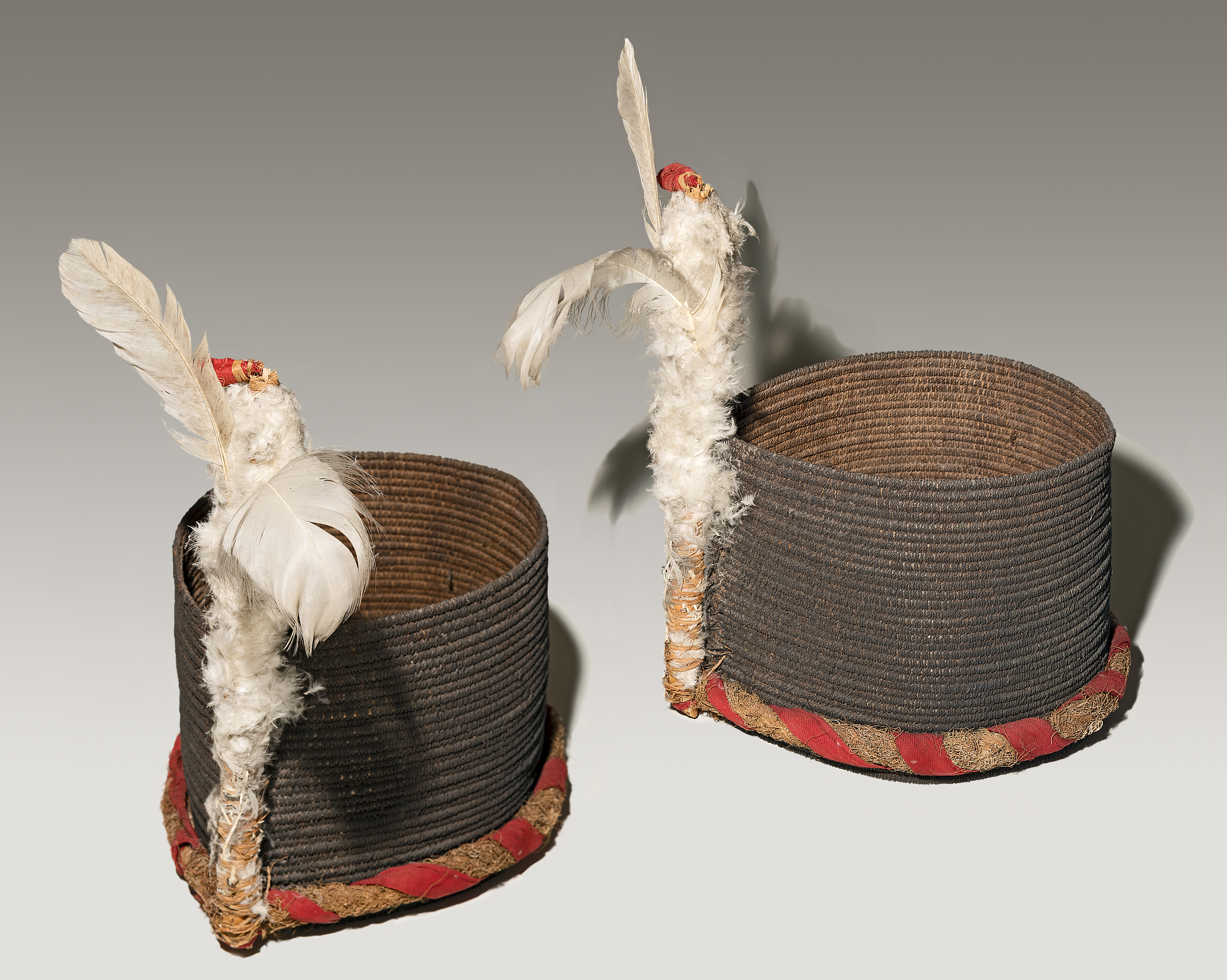
Headgear Tidi

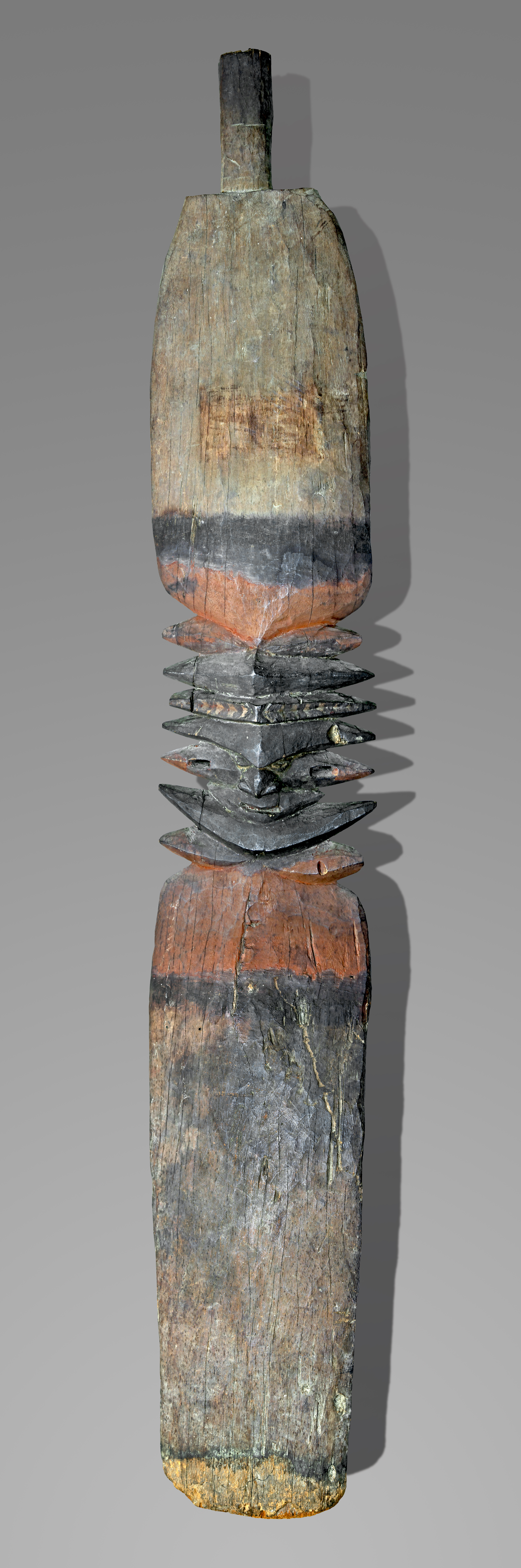
Carved wooden door jamb

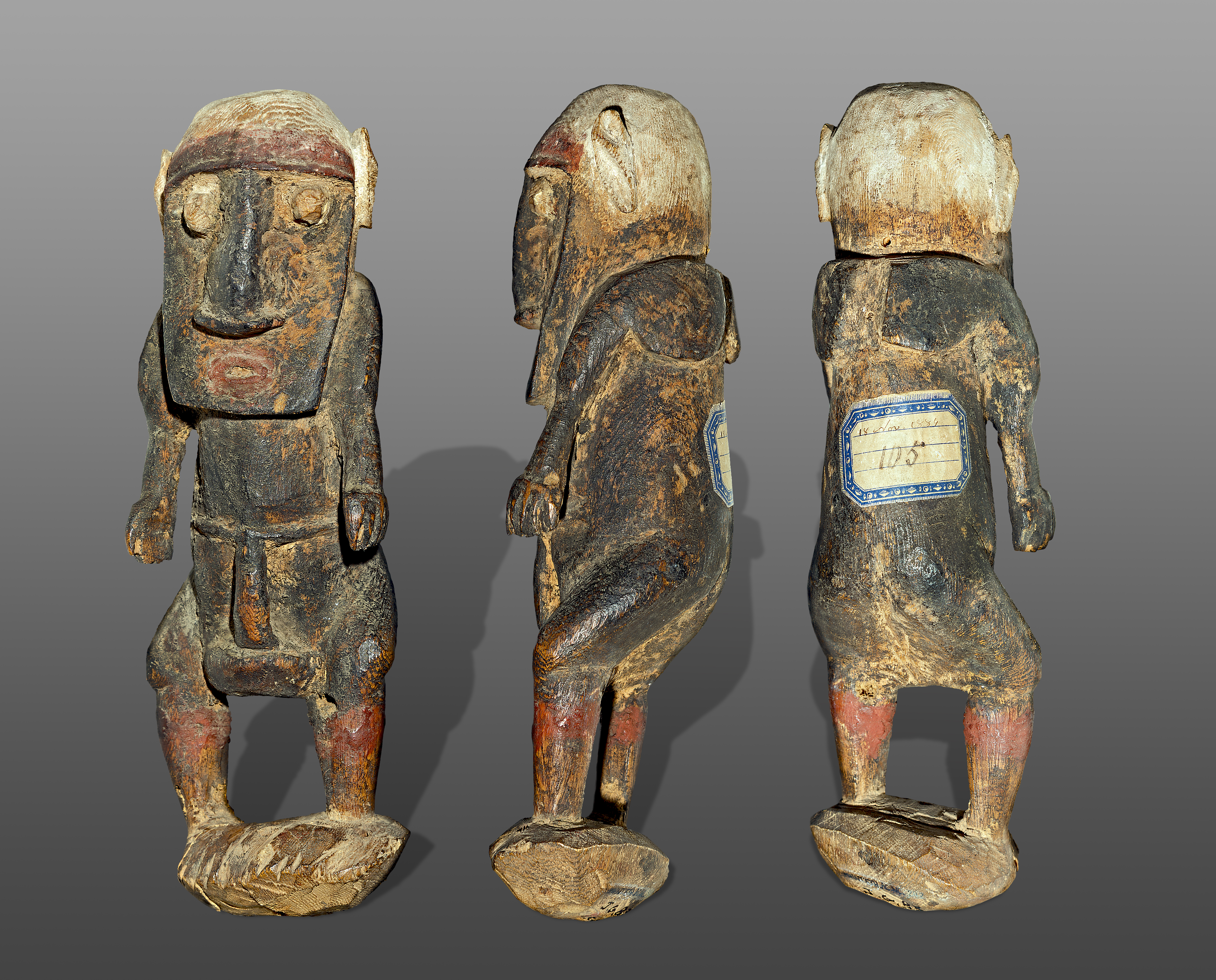
Male statuette wearing a penis sheath statement

== See also ==
- Christian Karembeu
- Antoine Kombouaré
- Jacques Zimako
- Kanak war clubs
- Kanaka (Pacific Island worker)
