= Kanak Language Academy =

Educational organization in New Caledonia

The Kanak Language Academy (KLA), or in French; Académie des langues kanak (ALK) is a local, public educational establishment in New Caledonia. Founded in 2007, with roots reaching to the Nouméa Accord of 1998, the legislative assembly endorsed the setting up of the French territory's first indigenous Kanak languages institute. Its mission is "to establish rules of usage and to help promote and develop all Kanak languages and dialects". The KLA is expected to standardise, protect, and develop the about forty Kanak languages and dialects, as well as standardize the written form for Kanak languages.

The majority of New Caledonian languages do not have a written form. Those that do, have a rudimentary one. As it was extremely difficult to standardize the spelling of Kanak languages, a program was developed by the KLA and the University of New Caledonia that would propose a common writing standard. All the collected data is analyzed by linguists that develop a form of writing which is accepted by the speakers.

KLA publishes dictionaries, folk tales, and glossaries. In 2009, it had three radio broadcasts daily from Monday to Friday. In 2008, it organized a festival, Space Orality.

There are eight project leaders, each working in one of the areas of the country who are supported by academicians. They are selected from New Caledonia's main cultural and traditional clans and confederations. Déwé Gorodey was appointed chair of the academy in 2007. Its current director is Weniko Ihage.
