= Jean-Marie Tjibaou Cultural Centre =

Cultural centre in New Caledonia

Tjibaou Cultural Centre
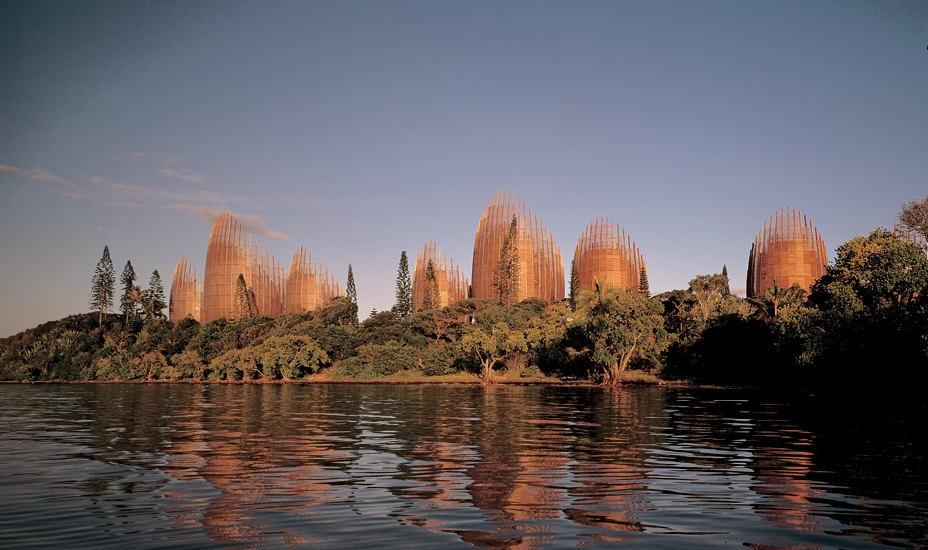
- Tjibaou Cultural Centre
- Interactive map of the Tjibaou Cultural Centre area

General information
- Location: Centre culturel Tjibaou, Rue des accords de Matignon, Tina B.P. 378 98845, Nouméa Cedex, Nouméa, New Caledonia
- Coordinates: 22°15′23.3″S 166°28′54.9″E
- Inaugurated: May 1998
- Owner: Government of New Caledonia

Design and construction
- Architect: Renzo Piano

Website
- www.adck.nc

The Tjibaou Cultural Centre (French: Centre culturel Tjibaou), on the narrow Tina Peninsula, approximately 8 kilometres (5.0 mi) northeast of the historic centre of Nouméa, the capital of New Caledonia, celebrates the vernacular Kanak culture, the indigenous culture of New Caledonia, amidst much political controversy over the independent status sought by some Kanaks from French rule. It opened in June 1998 and was designed by Italian architect Renzo Piano and named after Jean-Marie Tjibaou, the leader of the independence movement who was assassinated in 1989 and had a vision of establishing a cultural centre which blended the linguistic and artistic heritage of the Kanak people.

The Kanak building traditions and the resources of modern international architecture were blended by Piano. The formal curved axial layout, 250 metres (820 ft) long on the top of the ridge, contains ten large conical cases or pavilions (all of different dimensions) patterned on the traditional Kanak Grand Hut design. The building is surrounded by landscaping, which is also inspired by traditional Kanak design elements. Marie-Claude Tjibaou, widow of Jean Marie Tjibaou and current leader of the Agency for the Development of Kanak Culture (ADCK), observed: "We, the Kanaks, see it as a culmination of a long struggle for the recognition of our identity; on the French Government's part it is a powerful gesture of restitution."

== History ==
When the Matignon agreements were signed between the representatives of France and New Caledonia, Jean-Marie Tjibaou, the Kanak leader of the independent movement, had mooted a proposal to set up an Agency for the development of Kanak Culture with the objective of promoting Kanak linguistic and archaeological heritage, promote Kanak handicrafts and the arts, encourage cross-regional interactions and evolve design and conduct research activities. This plan was implemented after Jean-Marie Tjibaou was assassinated, to assuage local feelings. The French President ordered that a cultural centre on the lines suggested by Tjibaou be set up in Nouméa. The "Jean-Marie Tjibaou Cultural Centre", which identifies Kanak culture and identity, was formally established in May 1998.

However, based on a competition for designing the centre dated to 1991, the work was assigned to Renzo Piano and it was constructed between 1993 and 1998. The inaugural cultural director was Emmanual Kaserhou and the museum curator Susan Cochrane. The project was quite controversial because of its luxurious, expensive and monumental nature. The cost of maintenance were also very high, excessive in regards to New Caledonia's means, and the museum was described as empty.

In the early 2000s, the cultural center recorded approximately 70,000 visits a year. The entry fee was four euros.

== Geography ==
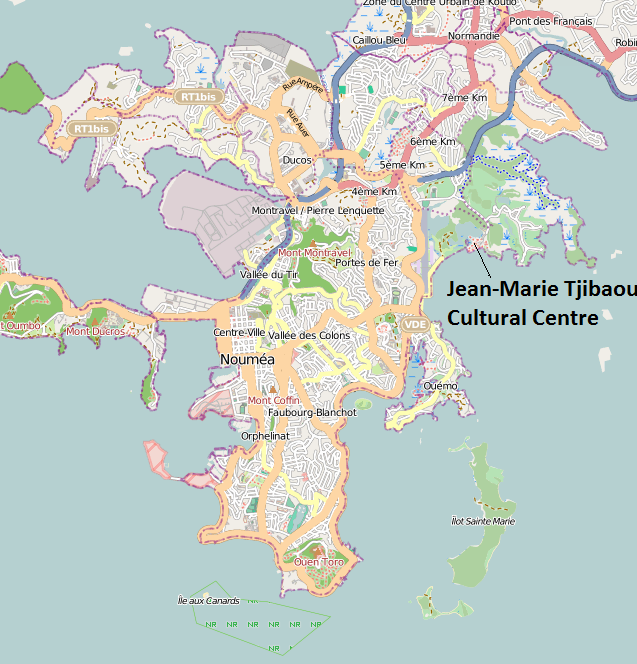
Location

The site is located on the narrow Tina Peninsula, which projects into the Pacific Ocean along a ridge line, near the Tina Golf Course on the western coast of Boulari Bay, approximately 8 kilometres (5.0 mi) northeast of the old city centre of Nouméa. Though the agency (ADCK) wished to set up the centre in the heart of the city to make a statement within the strongly French-influenced city, the land allotted is between the lagoon and the bay, which is an offshoot of the sea. The lagoon side of this area is made up of dense mangroves at the water edge. Earlier, other types of trees also covered the site. There was a well-trodden path along the centre of the area of the peninsula. A ridge separated the area from the sea, which created the ecology of the area with the bay side experiencing strong easterly winds. Intense heat of subtropical sun was also another factor which affected the design of the building.

== Concept planning ==
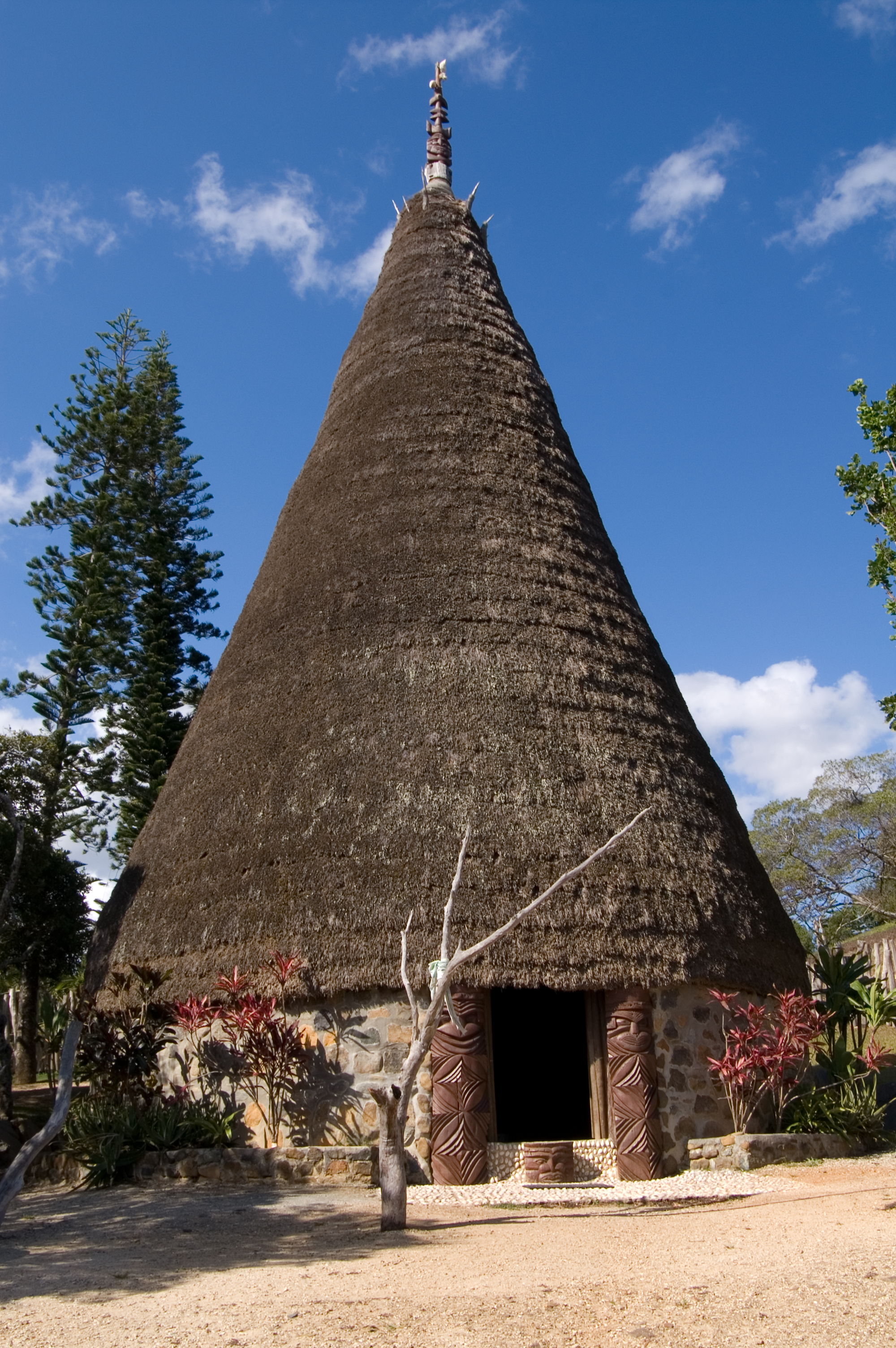
Traditional Kanak great house in a conical shape

The building plans, spread over an area of 8,550 square metres (92,000 sq ft) of the museum, were conceived to incorporate the link between the landscape and the built structures in the Kanak traditions. The people had been removed from their natural landscape and habitat of mountains and valleys and any plan proposed for the art centre had to reflect this aspect. Thus, the planning aimed at a unique building which would be, as the architect Piano stated, "to create a symbol" ..."a cultural centre devoted to Kanak civilization, the place that would represent them to foreigners that would pass on their memory to their grand children". The model as finally built evolved after much debate in organized 'Building Workshops' in which Piano’s associate Paul Vincent and Alban Bensa, an anthropologist of repute on Kanak culture were also involved. The precursor for this cultural centre was the first cultural festival held in 1975 in New Caledonia, which was a focused celebration of Kanak culture. The Melanesia 2000 Festival was also held at the same venue where the centre has been established now. The centre is also termed as "A politicized symbolic project", which evolved over long period of research and intense debate.

Another aspect of the Kanak's building tradition was that it did not fit in with the concept of a permanent building. They lived in temporary type of buildings made with locally available material which needed to be replaced from time to time in the subtropical climate. This involved a wood frame building built on earthen plinths and with roof covered by thatch. The form of the building also varied from island to island, generally round in plan and conical in the vertical elevation. They made the houses in groups with the headman’s house at the end of an open public alley formed by other buildings clustered along on both sides. Trees lined these alleys with a shady central gathering. This theme was adopted in the Cultural Centre planned by Piano and his associates.

An important concept that evolved after deliberations in the 'Building Workshops', after Piano won the competition for building the art centre, also involved "landscaping ideas" to be created around each building. To this end, an "interpretative landscape path" was conceived and implemented around each building with series of vegetative cover avenues along the path that surrounded the building, but separated it from the lagoon. This landscape setting appealed to the Kanak people when the centre was inaugurated. Even the approach to the buildings from the paths catered to the local practices of walking for three quarters of the path to get to the entrance to the Cases. One critic of the building observed: "It was very intelligent to use the landscape to introduce the building. This is the way the Kanak people can understand".

== Description ==
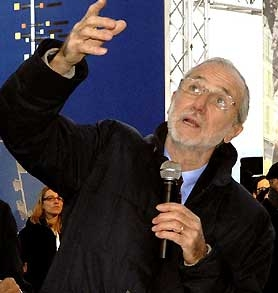
Renzo Piano

The architectural uniqueness of the centre is to the credit of Renzo Piano, an Italian architect.

=== Layout ===
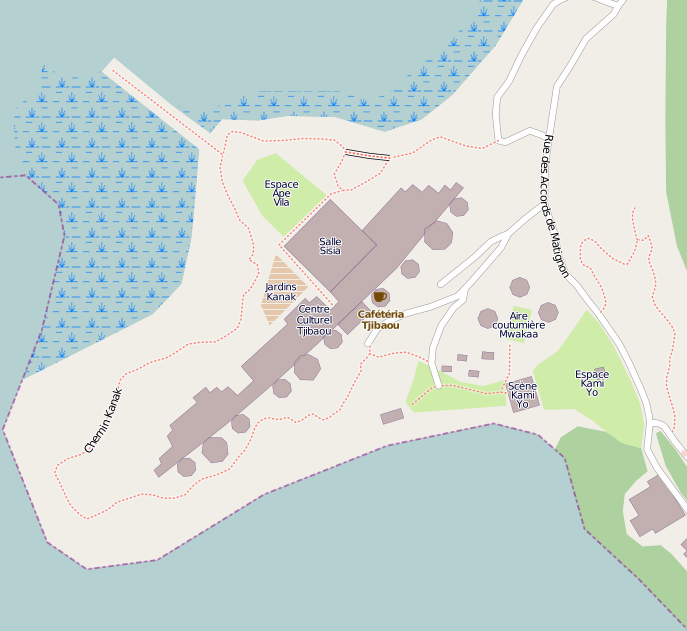
Map of the centre

The entire complex has been built along a 250 metres (820 ft) long ridge of the peninsula (a cape that extends southeast into the Pacific Ocean). The arrangement consists of 10 units called "cases," or hut pavilions, arranged in three groups or village clusters with one tall hut (the largest is 28 metres high) in each cluster representing the traditional "Great Hut" of the Kanak Chiefs. The main axis of the Cultural Centre (somewhat off the cardinal axis) consists of many covered walkways, green spaces, outdoor rooms, and gardens that are interlinked with the pavilions or cases and also with the smaller office buildings. The arrangement of the structures around the main axis has a symbolic content for the Kanaks. All the huts are of different sizes and different functions, but with the consistent form of vertically positioned shell-like structures which resemble the traditional huts of a Caledonian Village. They are arranged in a row sequentially along a lower rectangular path that follows the gentle curve of the peninsula. It forms a unique cultural ensemble at the Cultural Centre of arts built with wood technology using long-lasting iroko wood. The overall effect is that it "looks like a unified homogenous whole". A laminated wood construction blends with engineering architecture and is suitable for everyday use. The cultural centre has thus been described as "a perfected masterpiece and a deeply impressive, earth-bound example of a new interpretation of modernism". The layout takes note of the prevailing easterly wind directions from the sea and the structures as a whole are built to take full advantage of the wind and are also oriented to control sunlight and solar heat gain. The curved outer face of the huts is in direct contact with the windward side of the stormy Pacific Sea whereas the leeward side is oriented towards the serene lagoon. The sunlight engulfs the structure and casts a continually changing pattern of shadows through the louvers and members of the staves of the cases.

Another aspect of the layout is about the design of the paths connecting the cases and providing approach to them. They are covered so that visitors can walk in the area with comfort, as the average temperature in the area is 20 °C (68 °F) to 23 °C (73 °F) from April to August and 25 °C (77 °F) to 27 °C (81 °F) from September to March. The main sides of the paths are not covered with walls, as it would prevent air circulation and make the corridors intolerable. However, where the paths are open to direct light, louvers have been installed.

The landscape layout of the cases is set amidst transplanted Norfolk Island pines, which are as tall as the cases. Smaller trees are also planted in the areas near the lower offices. This layout presents a "planted indigenous landscape". A Melanesian food garden with taro and yam are also grown. Paths to the Great House are planted with Araucaria columnaris or column pine and coconut trees.

=== Materials ===
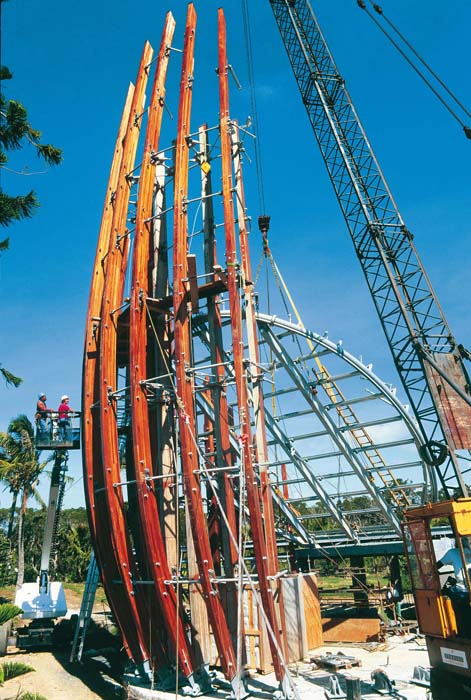
A case under construction

The materials used in the building of the conical domes consisted of laminated wood and natural wood, concrete, coral, aluminium castings, glass panels, tree bark and stainless steel. The iroko (Clorophora excelsa) timber used extensively was imported from Africa (native to tropical Africa, from Sierra Leone to Tanzania); it was decided to use iroko because it was durable, and mostly resistant to attack by insects, fungi and mould. The frames of all cases were pre-fabricated in France and assembled on-site.

=== Design of the cases ===
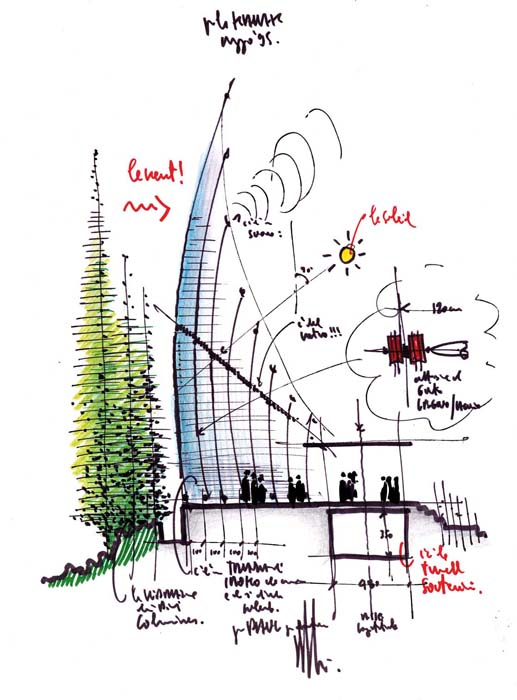
Diagram of a case drawn by architect Renzo Piano

The exterior part of the huts is given an ancient appearance whereas the interior of each hut has rectangular space (for housing permanent and temporary exhibitions, administration offices and studio spaces), where all amenities feature modern technology. The space within each hut was achieved by discarding the central pillar, a deviation from the traditional Kanak hut design. In the circular design of the hut’s shells, the height to diameter ratio was reduced giving more space, which also resulted in greater dynamic ventilation, as was corroborated by wind tunnel tests. The cases have giant curved ribs or staves, which are made of iroko slats and steel connections and which also act as climate control devices. The outer ribs are a curved assembly of slats, which are joined to a straight vertical rib that together form part of the case structure. The staves are designed in such a way that the individual pieces appear as if they are woven together. The roof is made of corrugated aluminium sheets. It has a double roof system, which contributes to the play of shadows. The bottom of the wall, formed by the arc of the staves, has special louvers, called nacos. The nacos open and close in tandem automatically by computer control calibrated to the speed of the wind. The double roof system also allows air to pass through the roof unchecked. During the monsoon season, the winds that blow over the cases are very strong, the compound curve of the cases resists the wind, with the nacos facilitating this action further by allowing air to pass directly through the cases.

=== Cases ===
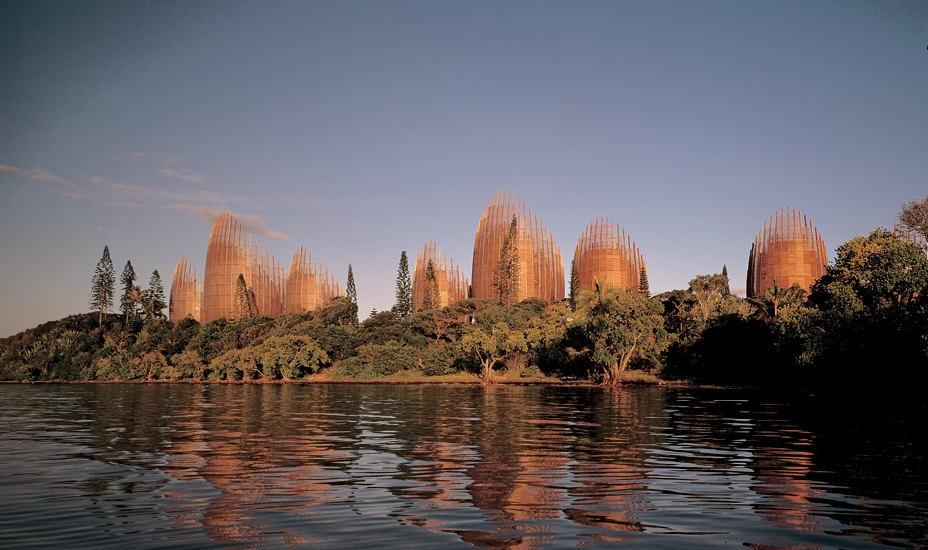
View of seven of the Tjibaou Cultural Centre pavilions, spanning roughly half the entire complex, from the facing sea.

In general, the exhibits in the Cultural Centre are organized in the three villages. In the first village, the emphasis is on exhibition activities. Right at the entrance is the permanent exhibition where visitors are given an insight into the Kanak culture. The cases that follow have displays related to the history of the community and the natural environment. This is followed by areas for temporary exhibitions and a theatre, a sunken auditorium where 400 people can be seated. An open-air theatre is provided behind the auditorium where cultural performances are held. The second village complex is used for the offices for historians, researchers, curators of exhibitions and administrative staff. The cases in front of the offices have a multimedia library and the halls here are used for conferences. The village at the end of the path, which is located slightly away from the visitors' area and which has studios, is devoted to creative activities such as dance, painting, sculpture, and music. There is also a school for children where they are taught the local art forms.

Notable exhibition halls in the sail-like structures of the cases include Case Bwenaado, Case Jinu, Case Mâlep, Case Umatë and Salle Bérétara. The Case Bwenaado or pavilion, a customary assembly place, houses the artifacts created by artists of the region. They symbolize the link among ethnic groups of the Pacific in respect of the traditions of their oral beliefs and rituals that govern their life. A new collection in this case received in May 2008, on loan from the Musée du Quai Branly, features 16 Kanak items dating from the late 18th century to early 20th century. These are in the form of historical pieces of Kanak sculpture and implements representing a rich Kanak heritage, though they are on loan from other museums. The Case Jinu or pavilion has six exhibits that are titled "The spirit of Oceania" which depict the origin of the world, people and their habitats from across the Pacific. The Case Mâlep has exhibits depicting the life and work of Jean-Marie Tjibaou, charismatic leader of the independent movement who initiated action to set up the Kanak cultural centre.

Exhibitions are rotated throughout the year, and temporary exhibitions are also part of the complex. The centre also has two workshops of artists. They have been given a deliberate "unfinished" appearance as a reminder that Kanak culture is still in the process of evolution – a belief held by the deceased Canaque leader, who was the inspiration for the site. The complex includes the Department of Visual Arts and Exhibitions which is intended to promote the creation of plastic contemporary Kanak art. The Fund for Contemporary Kanak and Oceanian Art (Le Fonds d'Art Contemporain Kanak et Océanien) was created in 1995, and consists of over 600 contemporary works from Australia and the Pacific Islands including New Caledonia.

== Gallery ==
Cluster of Cases or pavilions

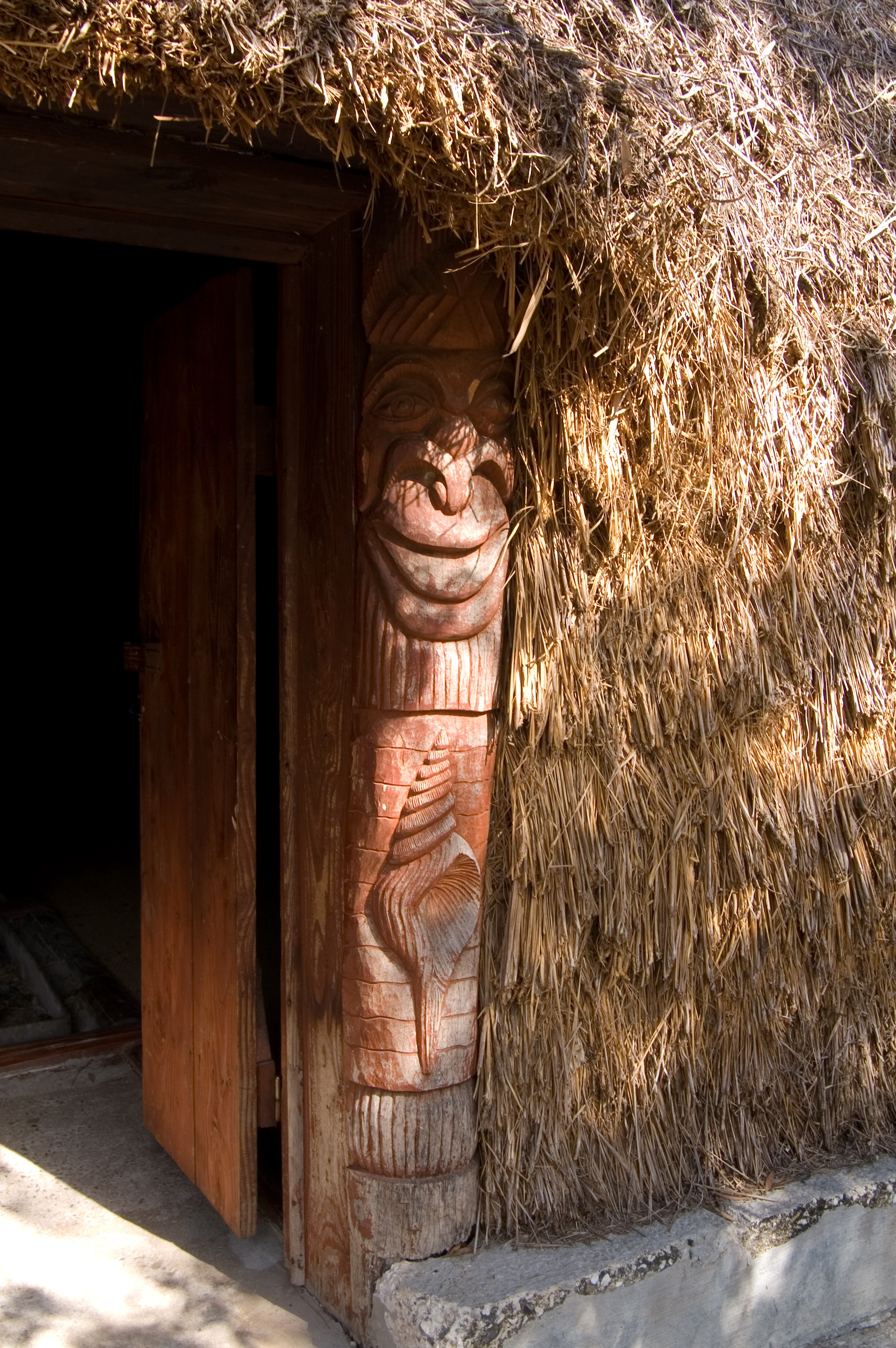
Kanak house detail

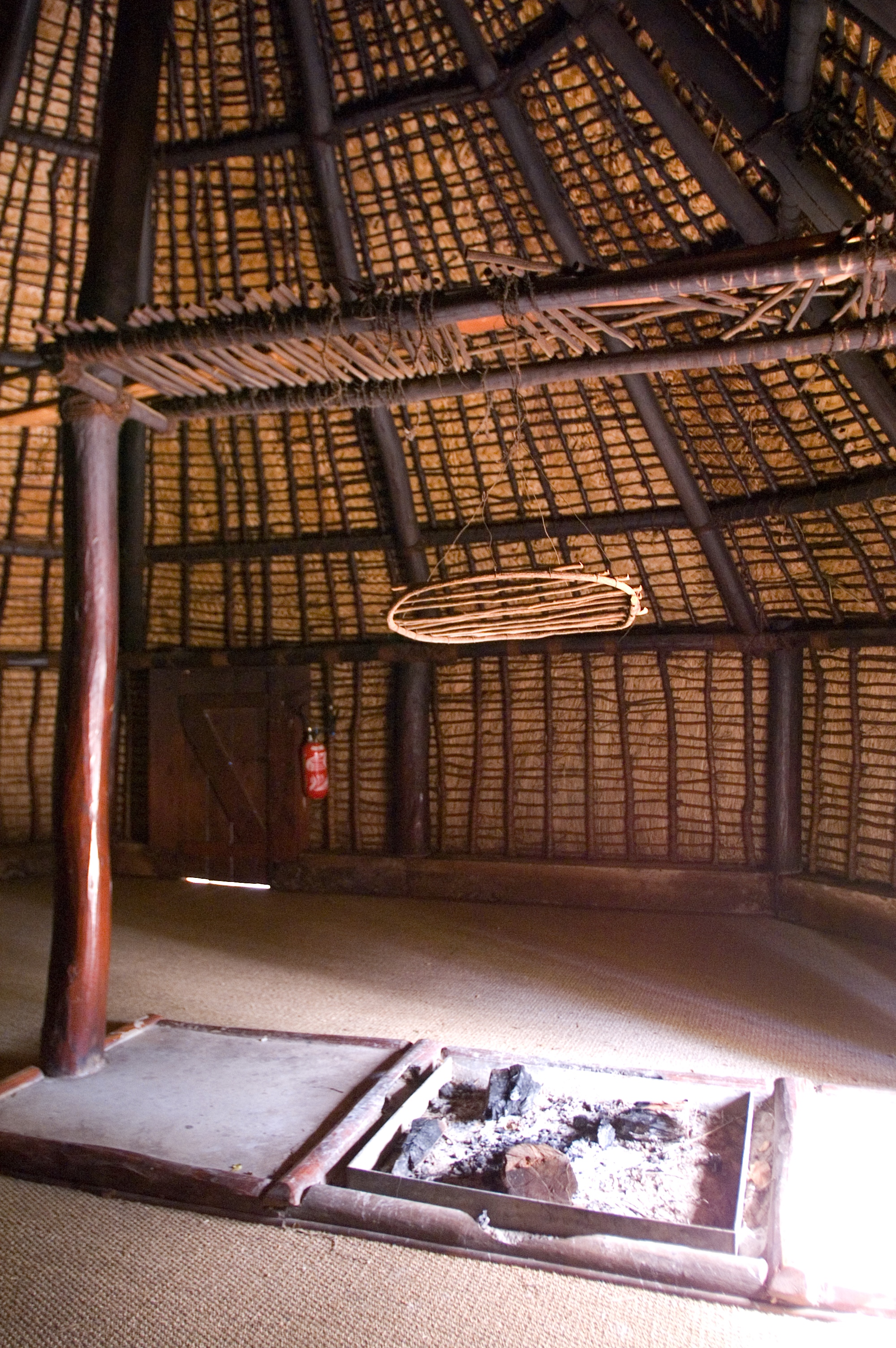
Inner view of a Kanak hut with a hearth

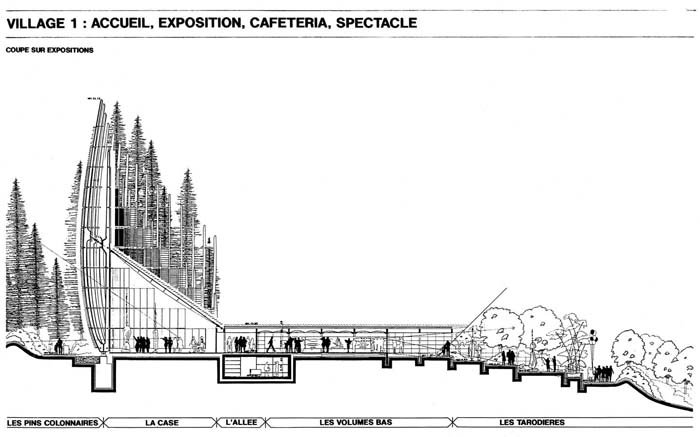
Interior architectural diagram of case
