= 2020 in New Caledonia =

- Decades: 2000s; 2010s; 2020s
- See also: Other events of 2020; Timeline of New Caledonia history

Events from 2020 in New Caledonia.

== Incumbents ==
- High Commissioner: Laurent Prévost
- President of the Government: Thierry Santa
- Vice President of the Government: Gilbert Tyuienon
- President of Congress: Roch Wamytan

== Events ==
Ongoing – COVID-19 pandemic in New Caledonia

- 4 April – President Thierry Santa went into self-isolation after a member of his staff tested positive for COVID-19.
- 4 October – An independence referendum was held, with 53.26 percent of voters opposed to independence. Turnout was 85.69 percent.
- 28 October – Protests started over plan to sell Vale nickel mine to consortium led by Trafigura, protestors blocked roads and port Noumea.
