= 2024 in New Caledonia =

- Decades: 2000s; 2010s; 2020s
- See also: Other events of 2024; Timeline of New Caledonia history

Events from 2024 in New Caledonia.

== Incumbents ==
- President of the Government: Louis Mapou
- Vice President of the Government: Isabelle Champmoreau
- President of Congress: Roch Wamytan, Veylma Falaeo (August)
- High Commissioner: Louis Le Franc

== Events ==
=== May ===
- May 13 – 2024 New Caledonia unrest: The High Commissioner of New Caledonia imposes a curfew and mobilizes security forces after a general strike and violent protests over proposed constitutional changes in the capital city Nouméa.
- May 14 –
  - Riots erupt in New Caledonia as France plans to change the constitution, allowing more recent French settlers to vote in the island's provincial elections, which protesters claim would marginalise the Indigenous Kanak people.
  - Three Kanak residents are killed and many more injured during a drive-by shooting by a group of french settlers
  - At least 54 officers are injured and more than 130 people are arrested. Shops and cars are looted, while a prison breakout has been prevented.
- May 15 – A fourth person is killed in New Caledonia.
- May 16 – France deploys 1,000 police officers to New Caledonia in an attempt to control the ongoing riots.
- May 17 – France accuses Azerbaijan of being behind the protests and violence in New Caledonia after Azerbaijani and Togolese flags are seen alongside indigenous Kanak symbols at the protests. Azerbaijan has previously spoken out against French colonialism and supported pro-independence participants in response to French support for Armenia.
- May 18 – The death toll from the ongoing protests and riots increases to six.
- May 19 – France sends police to New Caledonia to regain control of the road to La Tontouta International Airport, which is currently controlled by protesters.
- May 22 – New Caledonian telecom services thwart a massive email cyberattack on an internet provider prior to French President Emmanuel Macron's visit to the territory.

=== June ===
- June 12 – French president Emmanuel Macron suspends electoral reform in New Caledonia following riots.
- June 19 – New Caledonia police arrest independence leader Christian Tein and seven others on suspicion of being involved in the deadly violence that swept through the archipelago.
- June 23 – Independence leader Christian Tein and seven other activists are flown to France for pre-trial detention after being arrested for inciting violence and riots in New Caledonia.

=== September ===
- September 21 – Two New Caledonian independence activists are killed by police during an operation in Saint-Louis over their alleged involvement in the ongoing riots.

=== October ===
- October 1 – French Prime Minister Michel Barnier announces a one-year postponement of provincial elections in New Caledonia that were previously scheduled in December 2024.

=== December ===
- December 3 – New Caledonia's overnight curfew is lifted.
- December 24 – The territorial government collapses after environment and sustainable development minister Jérémie Katidjo-Monnier of Caledonia Together resigns from the cabinet of President Louis Mapou.

== Holidays ==
- 1 January - New Year's Day
- 1 April – Easter Monday
- 1 May – Labour Day
- 8 May – Victory Day
- 9 May – Ascension Day
- 20 May – Whit Monday
- 14 July – Bastille Day
- 15 August – Assumption Day
- 24 September – French Treaty Day
- 1 November – All Saints' Day
- 11 November – Armistice Day
- 25 December – Christmas Day
- 31 December – New Year's Eve
