= 2025 in New Caledonia =

- Decades: 2000s; 2010s; 2020s
- See also: Other events of 2025; Timeline of New Caledonia history

Events from 2025 in New Caledonia.

== Incumbents ==
- President of the Government: Louis Mapou (until 9 January); Alcide Ponga (since 9 January)
- Vice President of the Government: Isabelle Champmoreau (until 16 January) vacant thereafter
- President of Congress: Veylma Falaeo
- High Commissioner: Louis Le Franc (until 3 January); Jacques Billant (starting 3 January)

== Events ==
=== January ===
- January 4 – The 2025 Open Nouvelle-Calédononie tennis tournament concludes in Nouméa, with Shintaro Mochizuki winning the singles title.
- January 9 – Alcide Ponga, the leader of Le Rassemblement-Les Républicains, is elected President of the Government.

=== February ===
- February 13 – A false bomb warning is sent to Nouméa Magenta Airport, forcing a temporary suspension of operations.

June

- 24 June – President Emmanual Macron invites New Caledonian leaders of both pro-independence and pro-France factions to Paris to determine the territory's future governance and institutional status.

=== July ===
- 12 July – Representatives of the French government and New Caledonian political parties sign the Bougival Accord, an agreement outlining a new political status for the territory. The accord proposes the creation of a "State of New Caledonia" within the French Republic and the establishment of a Caledonian nationality alongside French nationality. The proposal must be approved by the French Parliament and then submitted to a referendum in New Caledonia scheduled for 2026.

August

- 13 August – The Kanak and Socialist National Liberation Front voted to reject the Bougival agreement on the basis that an independence referendum prior to France's 2027 presidential election was absent from the deal.

== Holidays ==
- 1 January - New Year's Day
- 21 April – Easter Monday
- 1 May – Labour Day
- 8 May – Victory Day
- 29 May – Ascension Day
- 9 June – Whit Monday
- 14 July – Bastille Day
- 15 August – Assumption Day
- 24 September – French Treaty Day
- 1 November – All Saints' Day
- 11 November – Armistice Day
- 25 December – Christmas Day
- 31 December – New Year's Eve
