= 2022 in New Caledonia =

- Decades: 2000s; 2010s; 2020s
- See also: Other events of 2022; Timeline of New Caledonia history

Events from 2022 in New Caledonia.

== Incumbents ==
- High Commissioner: Patrice Faure
- President of the Government: Louis Mapou
- Vice President of the Government: Isabelle Champmoreau
- President of Congress: Roch Wamytan

== Events ==
Ongoing – COVID-19 pandemic in New Caledonia

- 23 January – Radio New Zealand reported that New Caledonia was reporting an average of 300 new daily cases after the SARS-CoV-2 Omicron variant reached the territory earlier in January.
- 7 February – Cyclone Dovi causes one death in New Caledonia.

== Deaths ==
- 2 October – André Sinédo, 44, footballer (AS Magenta, national team).
