= 2024 French legislative election in New Caledonia =

Following the first round of the 2024 French legislative election on 30 June 2024, runoff elections in each constituency where no candidate received a vote share greater than 50 percent were scheduled for 7 July. Candidates permitted to stand in the runoff elections needed to either come in first or second place in the first round or achieve more than 12.5 percent of the votes of the entire electorate (as opposed to 12.5 percent of the vote share due to low turnout).

== 1st constituency ==
Candidate	Party or alliance		First round		Second round	
Candidate	Party or alliance		Votes	%	Votes	%
Nicolas Metzdorf	Miscellaneous right	Independent	22,316	39.81	34,577	52.41
Omayra Naisseline	Regionalists		20,370	36.34	31,399	47.59
Philippe Dunoyer	Ensemble	Horizons	5,791	10.33		
Veylma Falaeo	Miscellaneous left	Independent	2,731	4.87		
Simon Loueckhote	National Rally		2,562	4.57		
Muneiko Haocas	Regionalists	Independent	1,229	2.19		
Juanita Ciane Angexetine Epouse Railati	Regionalists	Independent	344	0.61		
Cédric Devaud	Ecologists	Independent	235	0.42		
Pierre-Henri Cuenot	Miscellaneous right	Independent	173	0.31		
Thomas Nasri	Reconquête		158	0.28		
Germaine Toléta Nemia Epouse Bishop	Regionalists	Independent	78	0.14		
Manuel Millar	Independent		63	0.11		
Total			56,050	100.00	65,976	100.00
Valid votes			56,050	98.48	65,976	98.21
Invalid votes			397	0.70	363	0.54
Blank votes			469	0.82	838	1.25
Total votes			56,916	100.00	67,177	100.00
Registered voters/turnout			97,163	58.58	97,162	69.14

== 2nd constituency ==
Candidate	Party or alliance		First round		Second round	
Candidate	Party or alliance		Votes	%	Votes	%
Emmanuel Tjibaou	Regionalists	Caledonian Union	32,926	44.06	51,724	57.44
Alcide Ponga	Miscellaneous right	Independent	27,038	36.18	38,320	42.56
Milakulo Tukumuli	Miscellaneous left	Independent	8,906	11.92		
Violette Salanon	Ensemble	Renaissance	3,946	5.28		
Luther Voudjo	Regionalists	Independent	1,114	1.49		
Ronald Frère	Regionalists	Independent	808	1.08		
Total			74,738	100.00	90,044	100.00
Valid votes			74,738	97.84	90,044	98.64
Invalid votes			609	0.80	495	0.54
Blank votes			1,042	1.36	745	0.82
Total votes			76,389	100.00	91,284	100.00
Registered voters/turnout			124,951	61.14	124,939	73.06
