= List of diplomatic visits to the United States under Joe Biden =

List of foreign visits by foreign leaders to Joe Biden catalogs all official visits to the United States by heads of state or government that involved meetings with President Joe Biden during his tenure as the 46th President of the United States. These visits—ranging from state and working visits to official and summit participations—highlight the diplomatic engagements between the Biden administration and global leaders.

The data is sourced primarily from the U.S. Department of State’s Office of the Historian, which compiles annual lists of visits in its Department History — Visits by Foreign Leaders archive. It includes:

- State Visits: Formal visits by heads of state, entailing ceremonial activities and high-level bilateral discussions.
- Working Visits: Less formal, typically focused on policy or crisis management.
- Official Visits: Intermediate in formality, often with scheduled meetings and a ceremonial agenda.
- Summit Attendance: Visits tied to multilateral summits or gatherings of regional or international groupings.

Entries are organized chronologically by year—from the start of Biden’s presidency on January 20, 2021, through the most recent update—and detail for each visit: the leader’s name, country, visit type/event, and date(s).

The article is structured into major sections by calendar years (2021, 2022, 2023, 2024), each containing a table of visits. Additional sections may include summary statistics (e.g., visits per country), types of visits, and context such as coinciding summits or global events. Cross-references to related articles—such as List of international presidential trips made by Joe Biden—provide a broader view of reciprocal diplomatic travel.

== Summary ==
Official Visits to the United States by Country (2021-2024)
Country	Total Visits (2021-2024)
Japan	8
Ukraine	7
Australia	7
Germany	6
United Kingdom	6
Israel	6
Canada	5
Italy	5
Philippines	5
South Korea	5
Ireland	5
Jordan	4
Chile	4
Colombia	4
Costa Rica	4
China	3
France	3
India	3
Brazil	3
Belgium	3
Ecuador	3
Singapore	3
Czechia	3
Poland	3
Romania	3
Mexico	2
Netherlands	2
Indonesia	2
Papua New Guinea	2
Peru	2
Uruguay	2
Dominican Republic	2
Fiji	2
Cook Islands	2
Micronesia	2
Palau	2
Marshall Islands	2
New Caledonia	2
Samoa	2
Tonga	2
Tuvalu	2
Slovenia	2
Islamic Republic of Afghanistan	1
Albania	1
Algeria	1
Angola	2
Antigua and Barbuda	1
Argentina	2
Bahamas	1
Barbados	1
Belize	1
Benin	1
Botswana	1
Brunei	2
Bulgaria	1
Burundi	1
Cabo Verde	1
Cambodia	1
Cameroon	1
Central African Republic	1
Chad	1
Comoros	1
Cote d'Ivoire	1
Croatia	1
Cyprus	1
Democratic Republic of the Congo	1
Denmark	2
Djibouti	1
Egypt	1
Equatorial Guinea	1
Estonia	1
Eswatini	1
Ethiopia	1
Finland	4
French Polynesia	2
Gabon	1
Ghana	1
Greece	2
Guatemala	1
Guinea-Bissau	1
Guyana	1
Hungary	1
Iceland	1
Iraq	2
Jamaica	1
Kazakhstan	1
Kenya	2
Kiribati	1
Kyrgyzstan	1
Laos	1
Latvia	1
Lesotho	1
Liberia	1
Libya	1
Lithuania	1
Luxembourg	1
Madagascar	1
Malawi	1
Malaysia	2
Mauritania	1
Mauritius	1
Montenegro	1
Morocco	1
Mozambique	1
Namibia	1
Nauru	1
New Zealand	2
Niger	1
Nigeria	1
Niue	1
North Macedonia	1
Norway	2
Paraguay	1
Portugal	1
Qatar	1
Republic of the Congo	1
Rwanda	1
Saint Lucia	1
Sao Tome and Principe	1
Senegal	1
Seychelles	1
Sierra Leone	1
Slovakia	1
Solomon Islands	1
Somalia	1
South Africa	1
Spain	2
Suriname	1
Sweden	3
Tajikistan	1
Tanzania	1
Thailand	2
Togo	1
Tunisia	1
Turkey	1
Turkmenistan	1
Uganda	1
United Arab Emirates	1
Uzbekistan	1
Vietnam	2
Zambia	1

== 2021 ==
Visitor	From	Description	Date
Prime Minister Yoshihide Suga	Japan	Official Working Visit	April 16, 2021
President Moon Jae-in	South Korea	Official Working Visit	May 21, 2021
President Ashraf Ghani	Islamic Republic of Afghanistan	Official Working Visit	June 25, 2021
President Reuven Rivlin	Israel	Official Working Visit	June 28, 2021
Chancellor Angela Merkel	Germany	Official Working Visit	July 15, 2021
King Abdullah II	Jordan	Official Working Visit	July 19, 2021
Prime Minister Mustafa Al-Kadhimi	Iraq	Official Working Visit	July 26, 2021
Prime Minister Naftali Bennett	Israel	Official Working Visit	August 26, 2021
President Volodymyr Zelenskyy	Ukraine	Official Working Visit	August 31, 2021
Prime Minister Scott Morrison	Australia	Official Working Visit	September 21, 2021
Prime Minister Boris Johnson	United Kingdom	Official Working Visit	September 21, 2021
Quad Leaders' Summit
Prime Minister Narendra Modi	India	Quad Leaders' Summit	September 24, 2021
Prime Minister Yoshihide Suga	Japan	Quad Leaders' Summit	September 24, 2021
Prime Minister Scott Morrison	Australia	Quad Leaders' Summit	September 24, 2021
North American Leaders' Summit
Prime Minister Justin Trudeau	Canada	North American Leaders' Summit	November 18, 2021
President Andrés Manuel López Obrador	Mexico	North American Leaders' Summit	November 18, 2021

== 2022 ==
Visitor	From	Description	Date
Prime Minister Jonas Gahr Støre	Norway	Working Visit	January 27, 2022
Emir Tamim bin Hamad Al Thani	Qatar	Working Visit	January 31, 2022
Chancellor Olaf Scholz	Germany	Working Visit	February 7, 2022
President Sauli Niinistö	Finland	Working Visit	March 4, 2022
Taoiseach Micheál Martin	Ireland	Working Visit	March 17, 2022
Prime Minister Lee Hsien Loong	Singapore	Working Visit	March 29, 2022
Prime Minister Mario Draghi	Italy	Working Visit	May 10, 2022
President Sauli Niinistö	Finland	Working Visit	May 19, 2022
Prime Minister Magdalena Andersson	Sweden	Working Visit	May 19, 2022
Prime Minister Jacinda Ardern	New Zealand	Working Visit	May 31, 2022
U.S.–ASEAN Summit
Prime Minister Phạm Minh Chính	Vietnam	Attended the U.S.–ASEAN Summit	May 12–13, 2022
Sultan Hassanal Bolkiah	Brunei	Attended the U.S.–ASEAN Summit	May 12–13, 2022
Prime Minister Hun Sen	Cambodia	Attended the U.S.–ASEAN Summit	May 12–13, 2022
President Joko Widodo	Indonesia	Attended the U.S.–ASEAN Summit	May 12–13, 2022
President Choummaly Sayasone	Laos	Attended the U.S.–ASEAN Summit	May 12–13, 2022
Prime Minister Ismail Sabri Yaakob	Malaysia	Attended the U.S.–ASEAN Summit	May 12–13, 2022
President Bongbong Marcos	Philippines	Attended the U.S.–ASEAN Summit	May 12–13, 2022
Prime Minister Prayut Chan-o-cha	Thailand	Attended the U.S.–ASEAN Summit	May 12–13, 2022
King Abdullah II of Jordan	Jordan	Working Visit	May 13, 2022
Prime Minister Kyriakos Mitsotakis	Greece	Working Visit	May 16, 2022
Summit of the Americas (Los Angeles, CA)
Prime Minister Gaston Browne	Antigua and Barbuda	Attended Summit of the Americas	June 8–10, 2022
President Alberto Fernández	Argentina	Attended Summit of the Americas	June 8–10, 2022
Prime Minister John Briceño	Belize	Attended Summit of the Americas	June 8–10, 2022
Prime Minister Justin Trudeau	Canada	Attended Summit of the Americas	June 8–10, 2022
President Gabriel Boric	Chile	Attended Summit of the Americas	June 8–10, 2022
President Iván Duque Márquez	Colombia	Attended Summit of the Americas	June 8–10, 2022
President Rodrigo Chaves Robles	Costa Rica	Attended Summit of the Americas	June 8–10, 2022
President Luis Abinader	Dominican Republic	Attended Summit of the Americas	June 8–10, 2022
President Guillermo Lasso	Ecuador	Attended Summit of the Americas	June 8–10, 2022
President Irfaan Ali	Guyana	Attended Summit of the Americas	June 8–10, 2022
Prime Minister Andrew Holness	Jamaica	Attended Summit of the Americas	June 8–10, 2022
President Mario Abdo Benítez	Paraguay	Attended Summit of the Americas	June 8–10, 2022
President Pedro Castillo	Peru	Attended Summit of the Americas	June 8–10, 2022
Prime Minister Philip J. Pierre	Saint Lucia	Attended Summit of the Americas	June 8–10, 2022
President Chandrikapersad Santokhi	Suriname	Attended Summit of the Americas	June 8–10, 2022
Prime Minister Philip Davis	The Bahamas	Attended Summit of the Americas	June 8–10, 2022
President Luis Lacalle Pou	Uruguay	Attended Summit of the Americas	June 8–10, 2022
President Andrés Manuel López Obrador	Mexico	Working Visit	July 12, 2022
President Cyril Ramaphosa	South Africa	Working Visit	September 16, 2022
UN General Assembly (New York)
Prime Minister Liz Truss	United Kingdom	Met at UNGA 2022	September 21, 2022
President Emmanuel Macron	France	Met at UNGA 2022	September 21, 2022
President Bongbong Marcos	Philippines	Met at UNGA 2022	September 22, 2022
U.S.–Pacific Islands Summit
Prime Minister Kausea Natano	Tuvalu	Attended U.S.–Pacific Islands Summit.	September 28, 2022
Prime Minister Mark Brown	Cook Islands	Attended U.S.–Pacific Islands Summit.	September 28, 2022
Prime Minister Frank Bainimarama	Fiji	Attended U.S.–Pacific Islands Summit.	September 28, 2022
President Édouard Fritch	French Polynesia	Attended U.S.–Pacific Islands Summit.	September 28, 2022
President David Kabua	Marshall Islands	Attended U.S.–Pacific Islands Summit.	September 28, 2022
President David Panuelo	Micronesia	Attended U.S.–Pacific Islands Summit.	September 28, 2022
President Louis Mapou	New Caledonia	Attended U.S.–Pacific Islands Summit.	September 28, 2022
President Surangel Whipps Jr.	Palau	Attended U.S.–Pacific Islands Summit.	September 28, 2022
Prime Minister James Marape	Papua New Guinea	Attended U.S.–Pacific Islands Summit.	September 28, 2022
Prime Minister Fiame Naomi Mataʻafa	Samoa	Attended U.S.–Pacific Islands Summit.	September 28, 2022
Prime Minister Manasseh Sogavare	Solomon Islands	Attended U.S.–Pacific Islands Summit.	September 28, 2022
Prime Minister Siaosi Sovaleni	Tonga	Attended U.S.–Pacific Islands Summit.	September 28, 2022
President Isaac Herzog	Israel	Working Visit	October 26, 2022
President Emmanuel Macron	France	State Visit	December 1, 2022
U.S.–Africa Leaders' Summit
Prime Minister Aïmene Benabderrahmane	Algeria	Attended U.S.–Africa Summit	December 13–15, 2022
Prime Minister Cleopas Sipho Dlamini	Eswatini	Attended U.S.–Africa Summit	December 13–15, 2022
President Teodoro Obiang Nguema Mbasogo	Equatorial Guinea	Attended U.S.–Africa Summit	December 13–15, 2022
President Abdel Fattah el-Sisi	Egypt	Attended U.S.–Africa Summit	December 13–15, 2022
President Ismaïl Omar Guelleh	Djibouti	Attended U.S.–Africa Summit	December 13–15, 2022
Prime Minister Patrick Achi	Côte d'Ivoire	Attended U.S.–Africa Summit	December 13–15, 2022
President Denis Sassou-Nguesso	Republic of the Congo	Attended U.S.–Africa Summit	December 13–15, 2022
President Félix Tshisekedi	DR Congo	Attended U.S.–Africa Summit	December 13–15, 2022
President Azali Assoumani	Comoros	Attended U.S.–Africa Summit	December 13–15, 2022
President Mahamat Idriss Déby Itno	Chad	Attended U.S.–Africa Summit	December 13–15, 2022
President Faustin-Archange Touadéra	Central African Republic	Attended U.S.–Africa Summit	December 13–15, 2022
President Paul Biya	Cameroon	Attended U.S.–Africa Summit	December 13–15, 2022
Prime Minister Ulisses Correia e Silva	Cape Verde	Attended U.S.–Africa Summit	December 13–15, 2022
President Évariste Ndayishimiye	Burundi	Attended U.S.–Africa Summit	December 13–15, 2022
President Mokgweetsi Masisi	Botswana	Attended U.S.–Africa Summit	December 13–15, 2022
President Patrice Talon	Benin	Attended U.S.–Africa Summit	December 13–15, 2022
President João Lourenço	Angola	Attended U.S.–Africa Summit	December 13–15, 2022
Prime Minister Abiy Ahmed	Ethiopia	Attended U.S.–Africa Summit	December 13–15, 2022
President Ali Bongo Ondimba	Gabon	Attended U.S.–Africa Summit	December 13–15, 2022
President Nana Akufo-Addo	Ghana	Attended U.S.–Africa Summit	December 13–15, 2022
President Umaro Sissoco Embaló	Guinea-Bissau	Attended U.S.–Africa Summit	December 13–15, 2022
President William Ruto	Kenya	Attended U.S.–Africa Summit	December 13–15, 2022
Prime Minister Sam Matekane	Lesotho	Attended U.S.–Africa Summit	December 13–15, 2022
President George Weah	Liberia	Attended U.S.–Africa Summit	December 13–15, 2022
President Mohamed al-Menfi	Libya	Attended U.S.–Africa Summit	December 13–15, 2022
President Andry Rajoelina	Madagascar	Attended U.S.–Africa Summit	December 13–15, 2022
President Lazarus Chakwera	Malawi	Attended U.S.–Africa Summit	December 13–15, 2022
President Mohamed Ould Cheikh El Ghazouani	Mauritania	Attended U.S.–Africa Summit	December 13–15, 2022
Prime Minister Pravind Kumar Jugnauth	Mauritius	Attended U.S.–Africa Summit	December 13–15, 2022
Prime Minister Aziz Akhannouch	Morocco	Attended U.S.–Africa Summit	December 13–15, 2022
President Filipe Nyusi	Mozambique	Attended U.S.–Africa Summit	December 13–15, 2022
President Hage Geingob	Namibia	Attended U.S.–Africa Summit	December 13–15, 2022
President Mohamed Bazoum	Niger	Attended U.S.–Africa Summit	December 13–15, 2022
President Muhammadu Buhari	Nigeria	Attended U.S.–Africa Summit	December 13–15, 2022
President Paul Kagame	Rwanda	Attended U.S.–Africa Summit	December 13–15, 2022
Prime Minister Patrice Trovoada	São Tomé and Príncipe	Attended U.S.–Africa Summit	December 13–15, 2022
President Macky Sall	Senegal	Attended U.S.–Africa Summit	December 13–15, 2022
President Wavel Ramkalawan	Seychelles	Attended U.S.–Africa Summit	December 13–15, 2022
President Julius Maada Bio	Sierra Leone	Attended U.S.–Africa Summit	December 13–15, 2022
President Hassan Sheikh Mohamud	Somalia	Attended U.S.–Africa Summit	December 13–15, 2022
President Samia Suluhu Hassan	Tanzania	Attended U.S.–Africa Summit	December 13–15, 2022
President Faure Gnassingbé	Togo	Attended U.S.–Africa Summit	December 13–15, 2022
President Kais Saied	Tunisia	Attended U.S.–Africa Summit	December 13–15, 2022
President Yoweri Museveni	Uganda	Attended U.S.–Africa Summit	December 13–15, 2022
President Hakainde Hichilema	Zambia	Attended U.S.–Africa Summit	December 13–15, 2022
President Guillermo Lasso	Ecuador	Working Visit	December 19, 2022
President Volodymyr Zelenskyy	Ukraine	Working Visit	December 21, 2022

== 2023 ==
Visitor	From	Description	Date
Prime Minister Fumio Kishida	Japan	Official Working Visit	January 13, 2023
President Luiz Inácio Lula da Silva	Brazil	Official Working Visit	February 10, 2023
Prime Minister Mark Rutte	Netherlands	Official Working Visit	January 17, 2023
Chancellor Olaf Scholz	Germany	Official Working Visit	March 3, 2023
President Sauli Niinistö	Finland	Official Working Visit	March 9, 2023
Private Visit
King Abdullah II and Crown Prince Hussein	Jordan	Private Visit (Lunch)	February 2, 2023
AUKUS Summit at Point Loma, California
Prime Minister Rishi Sunak	United Kingdom	AUKUS Summit	March 13, 2023
Prime Minister Anthony Albanese	Australia	AUKUS Summit	March 13, 2023
Taoiseach Leo Varadkar	Ireland	Working Visit	March 17, 2023
President Alberto Fernández	Argentina	Working Visit	March 29, 2023
President Gustavo Petro	Colombia	Working Visit	April 20, 2023
President Pedro Sánchez	Spain	Working Visit	May 12, 2023
Prime Minister Mette Frederiksen	Denmark	Working Visit	June 5, 2023
President Luis Lacalle Pou	Uruguay	Working Visit	June 13, 2023
President Yoon Suk Yeol	South Korea	State Visit	April 26, 2023
President Bongbong Marcos	Philippines	Official Working Visit	May 1, 2023
Prime Minister Rishi Sunak	United Kingdom	Official Working Visit	June 6–9, 2023
Prime Minister Narendra Modi	India	State Visit	June 22, 2023
Prime Minister Ulf Kristersson	Sweden	Working Visit	July 4–5, 2023
President Isaac Herzog	Israel	Working Visit	July 18–20, 2023
Prime Minister Giorgia Meloni	Italy	Working Visit	July 27, 2023
Trilateral Summit at Camp David, Maryland
Prime Minister Fumio Kishida	Japan	Trilateral Summit	August 18, 2023
President Yoon Suk Yeol	South Korea	Trilateral Summit	August 18, 2023
President Rodrigo Chaves Robles	Costa Rica	Official Working Visit	August 29, 2023
UN General Assembly Meeting – New York City
President Luiz Inácio Lula da Silva	Brazil	Meeting at the UNGA	September 20, 2023
Prime Minister Benjamin Netanyahu	Israel	Meeting at the UNGA	September 20, 2023
President Volodymyr Zelenskyy	Ukraine	Official Working Visit	September 21, 2023
C5+1 Presidential Summit
President Kassym-Jomart Tokayev	Kazakhstan	C5+1 Presidential Summit	September 21, 2023
President Sadyr Japarov	Kyrgyzstan	C5+1 Presidential Summit	September 21, 2023
President Emomali Rahmon	Tajikistan	C5+1 Presidential Summit	September 21, 2023
President Serdar Berdimuhamedov	Turkmenistan	C5+1 Presidential Summit	September 21, 2023
President Shavkat Mirziyoyev	Uzbekistan	C5+1 Presidential Summit	September 21, 2023
Pacific Islands Countries Summit – Washington, D.C.
Prime Minister Mark Brown	Cook Islands	Pacific Islands Countries Summit	September 25, 2023
President Wesley Simina	Micronesia	Pacific Islands Countries Summit	September 25, 2023
Prime Minister Sitiveni Rabuka	Fiji	Pacific Islands Countries Summit	September 25, 2023
President Moetai Brotherson	French Polynesia	Pacific Islands Countries Summit	September 25, 2023
President Taneti Maamau	Kiribati	Pacific Islands Countries Summit	September 25, 2023
President Russ Kun	Nauru	Pacific Islands Countries Summit	September 25, 2023
President Louis Mapou	New Caledonia	Pacific Islands Countries Summit	September 25, 2023
Premier Dalton Tagelagi	Niue	Pacific Islands Countries Summit	September 25, 2023
President Surangel Whipps Jr.	Palau	Pacific Islands Countries Summit	September 25, 2023
Prime Minister James Marape	Papua New Guinea	Pacific Islands Countries Summit	September 25, 2023
President David Kabua	Marshall Islands	Pacific Islands Countries Summit	September 25, 2023
Prime Minister Fiamē Naomi Mataʻafa	Samoa	Pacific Islands Countries Summit	September 25, 2023
Prime Minister Siaosi Sovaleni	Tonga	Pacific Islands Countries Summit	September 25, 2023
Prime Minister Kausea Natano	Tuvalu	Pacific Islands Countries Summit	September 25, 2023
President Frank-Walter Steinmeier	Germany	Working Visit	October 6, 2023
Prime Minister Anthony Albanese	Australia	Official Visit	October 25, 2023
President Gabriel Boric	Chile	Bilateral meeting	November 2, 2023
President Luis Abinader	Dominican Republic	Bilateral meeting	November 2, 2023
Americas Partnership for Economic Prosperity (APEP) Leaders' Summit – Washington, D.C.
Prime Minister Justin Trudeau	Canada	APEP Leaders' Summit	November 3, 2023
Prime Minister Mia Mottley	Barbados	APEP Leaders' Summit	November 3, 2023
President Gabriel Boric	Chile	APEP Leaders' Summit	November 3, 2023
President Rodrigo Chaves Robles	Costa Rica	APEP Leaders' Summit	November 3, 2023
President Gustavo Petro	Colombia	APEP Leaders' Summit	November 3, 2023
President Luis Abinader	Dominican Republic	APEP Leaders' Summit	November 3, 2023
President Guillermo Lasso	Ecuador	APEP Leaders' Summit	November 3, 2023
President Dina Boluarte	Peru	APEP Leaders' Summit	November 3, 2023
President Luis Lacalle Pou	Uruguay	APEP Leaders' Summit	November 3, 2023
President Xi Jinping	China	Bilateral Offsite Meeting at Woodside, CA	November 15, 2023
APEC Leaders' Summit – San Francisco, California
Prime Minister Anthony Albanese	Australia	APEC Leaders' Summit	November 12–17, 2023
Sultan Hassanal Bolkiah	Brunei	APEC Leaders' Summit	November 12–17, 2023
Prime Minister Justin Trudeau	Canada	APEC Leaders' Summit	November 12–17, 2023
President Gabriel Boric	Chile	APEC Leaders' Summit	November 12–17, 2023
President Xi Jinping	China	APEC Leaders' Summit	November 12–17, 2023
Prime Minister Fumio Kishida	Japan	APEC Leaders' Summit	November 12–17, 2023
President Yoon Suk Yeol	South Korea	APEC Leaders' Summit	November 12–17, 2023
Prime Minister Anwar Ibrahim	Malaysia	APEC Leaders' Summit	November 12–17, 2023
President Andrés Manuel López Obrador	Mexico	APEC Leaders' Summit	November 12–17, 2023
Prime Minister James Marape	Papua New Guinea	APEC Leaders' Summit	November 12–17, 2023
President Dina Boluarte	Peru	APEC Leaders' Summit	November 12–17, 2023
President Bongbong Marcos	Philippines	APEC Leaders' Summit	November 12–17, 2023
Prime Minister Lee Hsien Loong	Singapore	APEC Leaders' Summit	November 12–17, 2023
Prime Minister Srettha Thavisin	Thailand	APEC Leaders' Summit	November 12–17, 2023
President Võ Văn Thưởng	Vietnam	APEC Leaders' Summit	November 12–17, 2023
President Gustavo Petro	Colombia	APEC Leaders' Summit	November 12–17, 2023
Prime Minister Sitiveni Rabuka	Fiji	APEC Leaders' Summit	November 12–17, 2023
President Joko Widodo	Indonesia	Official Working Visit and APEC Leaders'Summit	November 13–17, 2023
President João Lourenço	Angola	Working Visit	November 30, 2023
President Volodymyr Zelenskyy	Ukraine	Working Visit	December 12, 2023

== 2024 ==
Visitor	From	Description	Date
Chancellor Olaf Scholz	Germany	Working Visit	February 9, 2024
King Abdullah II	Jordan	Working Visit	February 12, 2024
Prime Minister Giorgia Meloni	Italy	Working Visit	March 1, 2024
President Andrzej Duda and Prime Minister Donald Tusk	Poland	Working Visit	March 12, 2024
President Bongbong Marcos	Philippines	Working Visit	April 11, 2024
Prime Minister Petr Fiala	Czech Republic	Working Visit	April 15, 2024
Prime Minister Mohammed Shia' Al Sudani	Iraq	Working Visit	April 15, 2024
Taoiseach Leo Varadkar	Ireland	Working Visit	March 15, 2024
President Bernardo Arévalo	Guatemala	Official Visit	March 25, 2024
Prime Minister Fumio Kishida	Japan	Official Visit	April 10, 2024
King Abdullah II	Jordan	Private Visit	May 6, 2024
President Klaus Iohannis	Romania	Working Visit	May 7, 2024
President William Ruto	Kenya	State Visit	May 23, 2024
Prime Minister Alexander De Croo	Belgium	Working Visit	May 31, 2024
Prime Minister Keir Starmer	United Kingdom	Working Visit	July 10, 2024
NATO 75th Anniversary Summit – Washington, D.C.
President Volodymyr Zelenskyy	Ukraine	Attended; NATO 75th Anniversary Summit in Washington, D.C.	July 10–11, 2024
Prime Minister Edi Rama	Albania	Attended; NATO 75th Anniversary Summit in Washington, D.C.	July 10–11, 2024
Prime Minister Alexander De Croo	Belgium	Attended; NATO 75th Anniversary Summit in Washington, D.C.	July 10–11, 2024
Prime Minister Dimitar Glavchev	Bulgaria	Attended; NATO 75th Anniversary Summit in Washington, D.C.	July 10–11, 2024
Prime Minister Justin Trudeau	Canada	Attended; NATO 75th Anniversary Summit in Washington, D.C.	July 10–11, 2024
President Zoran Milanović	Croatia	Attended; NATO 75th Anniversary Summit in Washington, D.C.	July 10–11, 2024
President Petr Pavel	Czech Republic	Attended; NATO 75th Anniversary Summit in Washington, D.C.	July 10–11, 2024
Prime Minister Mette Frederiksen	Denmark	Attended; NATO 75th Anniversary Summit in Washington, D.C.	July 10–11, 2024
Prime Minister Kaja Kallas	Estonia	Attended; NATO 75th Anniversary Summit in Washington, D.C.	July 10–11, 2024
President Alexander Stubb	Finland	Attended; NATO 75th Anniversary Summit in Washington, D.C.	July 10–11, 2024
President Emmanuel Macron	France	Attended; NATO 75th Anniversary Summit in Washington, D.C.	July 10–11, 2024
Chancellor Olaf Scholz	Germany	Attended; NATO 75th Anniversary Summit in Washington, D.C.	July 10–11, 2024
Prime Minister Kyriakos Mitsotakis	Greece	Attended; NATO 75th Anniversary Summit in Washington, D.C.	July 10–11, 2024
Prime Minister Viktor Orbán	Hungary	Attended; NATO 75th Anniversary Summit in Washington, D.C.	July 10–11, 2024
Prime Minister Bjarni Benediktsson	Iceland	Attended; NATO 75th Anniversary Summit in Washington, D.C.	July 10–11, 2024
Prime Minister Giorgia Meloni	Italy	Attended; NATO 75th Anniversary Summit in Washington, D.C.	July 10–11, 2024
Prime Minister Fumio Kishida	Japan	Attended; NATO 75th Anniversary Summit in Washington, D.C.	July 10–11, 2024
President Edgars Rinkēvičs	Latvia	Attended; NATO 75th Anniversary Summit in Washington, D.C.	July 10–11, 2024
President Gitanas Nausėda	Lithuania	Attended; NATO 75th Anniversary Summit in Washington, D.C.	July 10–11, 2024
Prime Minister Luc Frieden	Luxembourg	Attended; NATO 75th Anniversary Summit in Washington, D.C.	July 10–11, 2024
Prime Minister Milojko Spajić	Montenegro	Attended; NATO 75th Anniversary Summit in Washington, D.C.	July 10–11, 2024
Prime Minister Dick Schoof	Netherlands	Attended; NATO 75th Anniversary Summit in Washington, D.C.	July 10–11, 2024
Prime Minister Christopher Luxon	New Zealand	Attended; NATO 75th Anniversary Summit in Washington, D.C.	July 10–11, 2024
Prime Minister Hristijan Mickoski	North Macedonia	Attended; NATO 75th Anniversary Summit in Washington, D.C.	July 10–11, 2024
Prime Minister Jonas Gahr Støre	Norway	Attended; NATO 75th Anniversary Summit in Washington, D.C.	July 10–11, 2024
President Andrzej Duda	Poland	Attended; NATO 75th Anniversary Summit in Washington, D.C.	July 10–11, 2024
Prime Minister Luís Montenegro	Portugal	Attended; NATO 75th Anniversary Summit in Washington, D.C.	July 10–11, 2024
President Yoon Suk Yeol	South Korea	Attended; NATO 75th Anniversary Summit in Washington, D.C.	July 10–11, 2024
President Klaus Iohannis	Romania	Attended; NATO 75th Anniversary Summit in Washington, D.C.	July 10–11, 2024
President Peter Pellegrini	Slovakia	Attended; NATO 75th Anniversary Summit in Washington, D.C.	July 10–11, 2024
Prime Minister Robert Golob	Slovenia	Attended; NATO 75th Anniversary Summit in Washington, D.C.	July 10–11, 2024
Prime Minister Pedro Sánchez	Spain	Attended; NATO 75th Anniversary Summit in Washington, D.C.	July 10–11, 2024
Prime Minister Ulf Kristersson	Sweden	Attended; NATO 75th Anniversary Summit in Washington, D.C.	July 10–11, 2024
President Recep Tayyip Erdoğan	Turkey	Attended; NATO 75th Anniversary Summit in Washington, D.C.	July 10–11, 2024
Prime Minister Keir Starmer	United Kingdom	Attended; NATO 75th Anniversary Summit in Washington, D.C.	July 10–11, 2024
Prime Minister Benjamin Netanyahu	Israel	Working Visit	July 25, 2024
Prime Minister Keir Starmer	United Kingdom	Working Visit	September 13, 2024
Quad Leaders' Summit – Claymont, Delaware
Prime Minister Narendra Modi	India	Attended Quad Leaders' Summit in Claymont, DE	September 21, 2024
Prime Minister Fumio Kishida	Japan	Attended Quad Leaders' Summit in Claymont, DE	September 21, 2024
Prime Minister Anthony Albanese	Australia	Attended Quad Leaders' Summit in Claymont, DE	September 21, 2024
President Mohamed bin Zayed Al Nahyan	United Arab Emirates	Official Visit	September 23, 2024
United Nations General Assembly – New York City
President Surangel Whipps Jr.	Palau	Met with President Biden at the UN General Assembly in New York City	September 24, 2024
President Wesley Simina	Micronesia	Met with President Biden at the UN General Assembly in New York City	September 24, 2024
President Hilda Heine	Marshall Islands	Met with President Biden at the UN General Assembly in New York City	September 25, 2024
General Secretary Tô Lâm	Vietnam	Met with President Biden at the UN General Assembly in New York City	September 25, 2024
President Volodymyr Zelenskyy	Ukraine	Met with President Biden at the UN General Assembly in New York City	September 25, 2024
President Volodymyr Zelenskyy	Ukraine	Working Visit	September 26, 2024
Taoiseach Simon Harris	Ireland	Official Visit	October 9, 2024
Prime Minister Robert Golob	Slovenia	Official Visit	October 22, 2024
President Nikos Christodoulides	Cyprus	Official Visit	October 30–31, 2024
President Prabowo Subianto	Indonesia	Official Visit	November 12, 2024
President Isaac Herzog	Israel	Official Visit	November 12, 2024
