= 2023 in New Caledonia =

- Decades: 2000s; 2010s; 2020s
- See also: Other events of 2023; Timeline of New Caledonia history

Events from 2023 in New Caledonia.

== Incumbents ==
- High Commissioner: Patrice Faure (until 6 February); Louis Le Franc onwards
- President of the Government: Louis Mapou
- Vice President of the Government: Isabelle Champmoreau
- President of Congress: Roch Wamytan

== Events ==
Ongoing – COVID-19 pandemic in New Caledonia

- February – Cyclones Judy and Kevin cause damage to New Caledonia.
- 19 May – A major 7.7 magnitude earthquake strikes the Loyalty Islands, New Caledonia, causing tsunami warnings in Tonga, Tuvalu, Vanuatu and other countries in the South Pacific, and generating a 60 cm (2.0 ft) tsunami in Lenakel, Vanuatu.
