= Didier Poidyaliwane =

New Caledonian politician (1966–2022)

Member of the Government of New Caledonia
- In office 1 December 2017 – 2 February 2021

Personal details
- Born: 15 March 1966 Poindimié, New Caledonia, France
- Died: 12 January 2022 (aged 55)
- Party: FLNKS-UC

Didier Poidyaliwane (15 March 1966 – 12 January 2022) was a New Caledonian politician. A pro-independence activist, he was a member of the Caledonian Union (UC) and the Kanak and Socialist National Liberation Front (FLNKS) and strongly defended the rights of indigenous Kanak people. He served in the cabinet of Philippe Germain and Thierry Santa as a minister in the Government of New Caledonia.

== Biography ==
=== Education and professional career ===
Poidyaliwane was educated in agriculture at the Lycée d'enseignement professionnel agricole in Châtillon-sur-Seine, Metropolitan France. In 1997, he joined the Agence de développement rural et d'aménagement foncier (ADRAF), a public institution which sought to redistribute land back to the Kanak people of New Caledonia. In 2008, he earned a master's degree in local development from the University of New Caledonia. In 2011, he became Deputy Director General of ADRAF. He was also appointed to the Conseil économique, social et environnemental de la Nouvelle-Calédonie in 2010, and became its 4th vice-president in 2016.

=== Political career ===
An activist within the Caledonian Union, Poidyaliwane was elected to serve in the Government of New Caledonia on 31 August 2017, taking office on 1 December of that year under the leadership of non-independentist Philippe Germain. He was assigned leadership of customary affairs, environmental protection, relations with the Customary Senate, and the Customary area of New-Caledonia.

While in government Poidyaliwane organized the development of a sustainable water policy alongside non-independentist Nicolas Metzdorf and held a conference in Nouméa. From this policy, the Mission interservices de l’eau was born, which aimed to continue to provide drinking water to all New Caledonians while preserving the island's natural resources. The mission also sought to eliminate New Caledonian consumption of untreated water by 2045 and improve the use of water in agriculture to achieve a food coverage rate of 50% by 2030. The plan was approved unanimously by the Congress of New Caledonia on 20 March 2019.

=== Personal life and death ===
Poidyaliwane died on 12 January 2022, at the age of 55.
