= 2020–2021 New Caledonian protests =

Protests over the sale of a nickel mine

2020 protests in New Caledonia
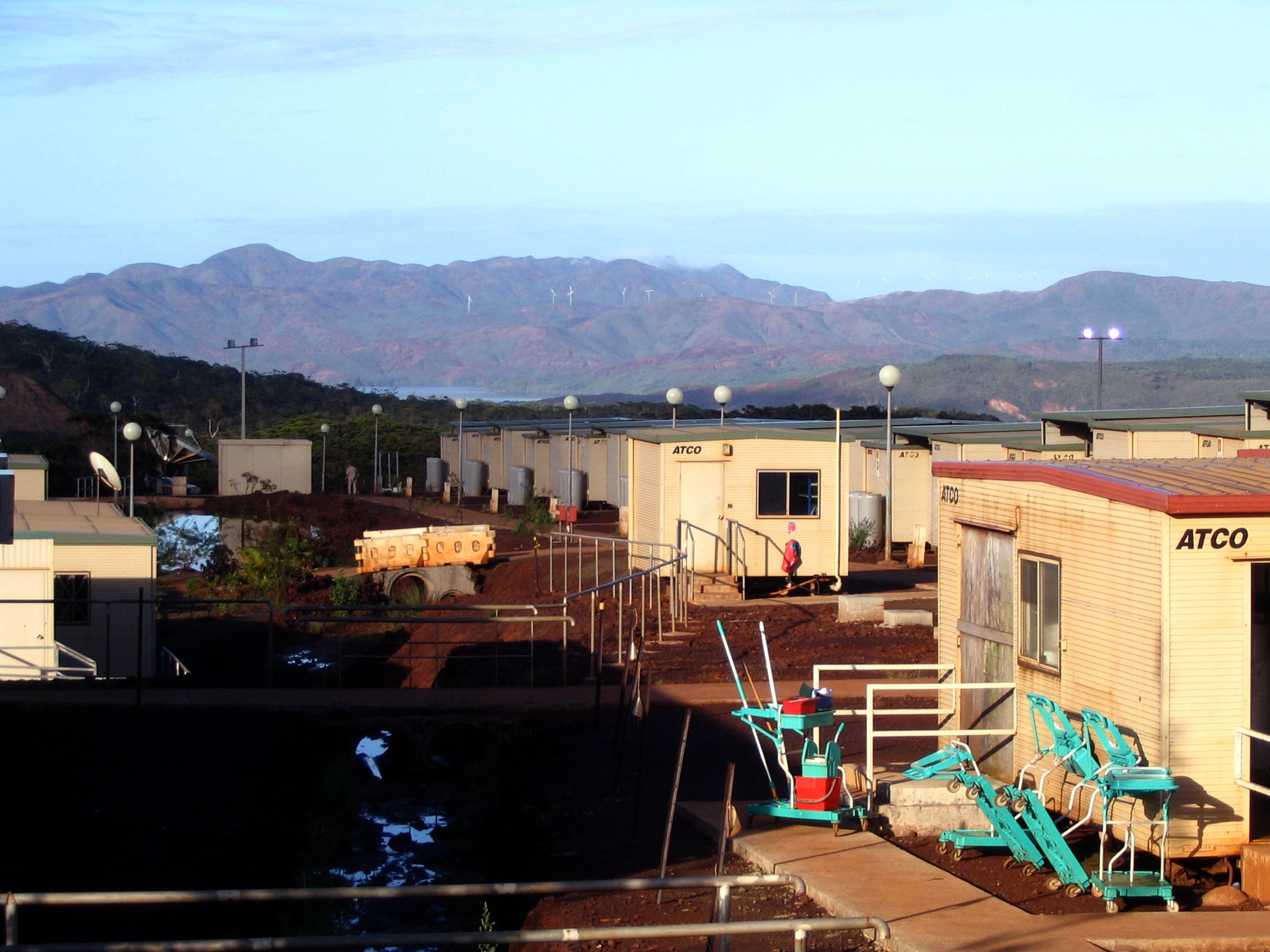
- Mining camp at the "Goro mine", where nickel is extracted
- Date: 28 October 2020 - ongoing
- Location: New Caledonia
- Caused by: Planned sale of Vale-owned nickel mine to consortium led by Trafigura and planned exportation of nickel ore out of New Caledonia; Government mishandling of the COVID-19 pandemic
- Goals: Sale of nickel mine to a domestic company rather than foreign; Independence
- Methods: Peaceful protesting; Rioting; Arson; Roadblocks; Port blockades; Armed demonstrations

Parties
Protesters; New Caledonian separatists; Indigenous Customary Negotiating Body; Kanak and Socialist National Liberation Front; Union of Kanak and Exploited Workers	Police; Counter protesters; Anti-independence French loyalists; Vale S.A.; Government of France

Casualties
- Injuries: Several police officers
- Arrested: Dozens of protesters

The 2020 protests in New Caledonia began on 28 October 2020 over a plan to sell a Vale-owned nickel and cobalt mine to a consortium led by Trafigura. The nickel mine and plant is known as the Goro mine. Independence leaders and pro-independence protesters wanted for the nickel plant to be owned by citizens of New Caledonia rather than foreign investors, though various arrangements have been proposed.

The controversy over the nickel mining industry, a key part of New Caledonia's economy, rekindled interest in independence about a month after the French territory voted narrowly in a referendum to remain a territory of France. Protests, riots, counter-protests and general civil unrest occurred in New Caledonia as a result of the planned sale of the Goro mine. Tension ran high in the territory, and lead to a collapse of its coalition government after resignations from pro-independence politicians.

== Background ==
New Caledonia holds as much as a quarter of the world's known nickel reserves. The Vale-owned Goro mine has been wracked with difficulties over the years. Riots occurred in 2014 after about 100,000 litres of acid-tainted effluent spilled from the site into a local river. This concerned youth groups and environmentalists, and also resulted in protests at the plant. Similar mining effluent spills have damaged the New Caledonian barrier reef. Vale has lost billions on maintaining operations at the Goro mine, and it was a financial drain on the company for years.

In November 2016, the French government afforded a state loan to Vale which consisted of 200 million euros. The nickel sector employs about 1 in 5 people in New Caledonia.

According to the Asia Times, "The territory’s 290,000 population is closely divided between the Kanaks, who are Melanesian, and settlers who began arriving in the mid-19th century when France set up a penal colony." Conservative loyalist Sonia Backès has claimed that the Kanak independence movement is risking a civil war.

Two referendums regarding the question of independence were held, followed by a third, as per the Nouméa Accord.

== Sale of Goro mine ==
Vale, a Brazilian corporation, owned the Goro nickel mine and plant for years. It was planned that the Goro mine would be sold to Trafigura, a Swiss-based commodity trader. Following unrest and public backlash from people in New Caledonia, the deal was challenged.

Vale postponed the sale of the mining operations, at the request of the territory's authorities. The company stated that if the sale fails, it will shut down the plant. The Fiji Times said this could result in job loss for thousands of workers. The French newspaper Le Monde claimed that some 3,000 jobs are at stake.

== Reaction and unrest ==
A group known as the Indigenous Customary Negotiating Body (Instance Coutumière Autochtone de Négociation), or ICAN opposed the deal to sell the mine to a foreign company, and along with independence leaders, wanted the mine sold to the domestic company Sofinor instead, backed by Korea Zinc. This has also been backed by the Kanak and Socialist National Liberation Front. The French government was dismissive of the proposal to sell the mine to a domestic company. The USTKE union, which backs the Labour Party, called for a general strike.

Protests and roadblocks across New Caledonia resulted in the nickel industry's day-to-day functions coming to a halt, including the prevention of successful delivery of nickel ore to the territory's Doniambo smelter plant in Nouméa. Roadblocks and demonstrations also reached the island's main port, and colonial authorities suspended international flights. Armed counter-protesters displayed French flags while occupying roadblocks previously held by independence activists. France banned the transport of weapons to counter violence. The roadblocks were later removed. Dozens of protesters were arrested, and several police officers injured. Police reportedly fired tear gas at protesters in central Nouméa.

French President Emmanuel Macron and his overseas minister, Sebastien Lecornu, were asked to intervene in the crisis and to help to form a nickel strategy for the island which could be broadly accepted.

Vale stated that a fire had broken out at the mining plant and local security forces were protecting it. Vale suspended activities in New Caledonia.

Anti-independence counter-protesters organized a march in Nouméa, led by New Caledonia president Thierry Santa, which over 20,000 people attended. Regarding the COVID-19 pandemic in New Caledonia, the Loyalty Islands Province banned police mobile squads flown in from mainland France from entering the islands because they were allowed to leave quarantine early at the height of the unrest. Kanak leaders called the move to allow police to escape mandatory quarantine a violation of health measures.

Negotiations with protesters resulted in blockades being removed. This allowed nickel ore to once again be delivered to the nickel smelter. There were multiple cases of arson at mining-related sites. A proposal by the president of New Caledonia's southern province would allow for fifty-one percent of the nickel plant's stake to go to New Caledonians. Tensions were high in New Caledonia, with pro-independence figures wanting foreigners to hold zero stake in the mine. Anti-independence figures accused the pro-independence FLNKS movement of enacting a coup against the government, describing it as terrorism.

Following the unrest in the territory and resignations from pro-independence officials, the coalition government in New Caledonia collapsed, requiring Congress to elect a new government. Pro-independence parties won a majority in the elections for a new government.

== See also ==
- COVID-19 pandemic in New Caledonia
- Economy of New Caledonia
- 2018 New Caledonian independence referendum
- 2020 New Caledonian independence referendum
- 2021 New Caledonian independence referendum
- Kanak and Socialist National Liberation Front
- Goro mine
