= 2026 in New Caledonia =

- Decades: 2000s; 2010s; 2020s
- See also: Other events of 2026; Timeline of New Caledonia history

Events from 2026 in New Caledonia.

== Events ==
- 28 June – 2026 New Caledonian legislative election

== Holidays ==
- 1 January – New Year's Day
- 6 April – Easter Monday
- 1 May – Labour Day
- 8 May – Victory Day
- 14 May – Ascension Day
- 25 May – Whit Monday
- 14 July – Bastille Day
- 15 August – Assumption Day
- 24 September – French Treaty Day
- 1 November – All Saints' Day
- 11 November – Armistice Day
- 25 December – Christmas Day
- 31 December – New Year's Eve
