= Cynthia Ligeard =

French politician

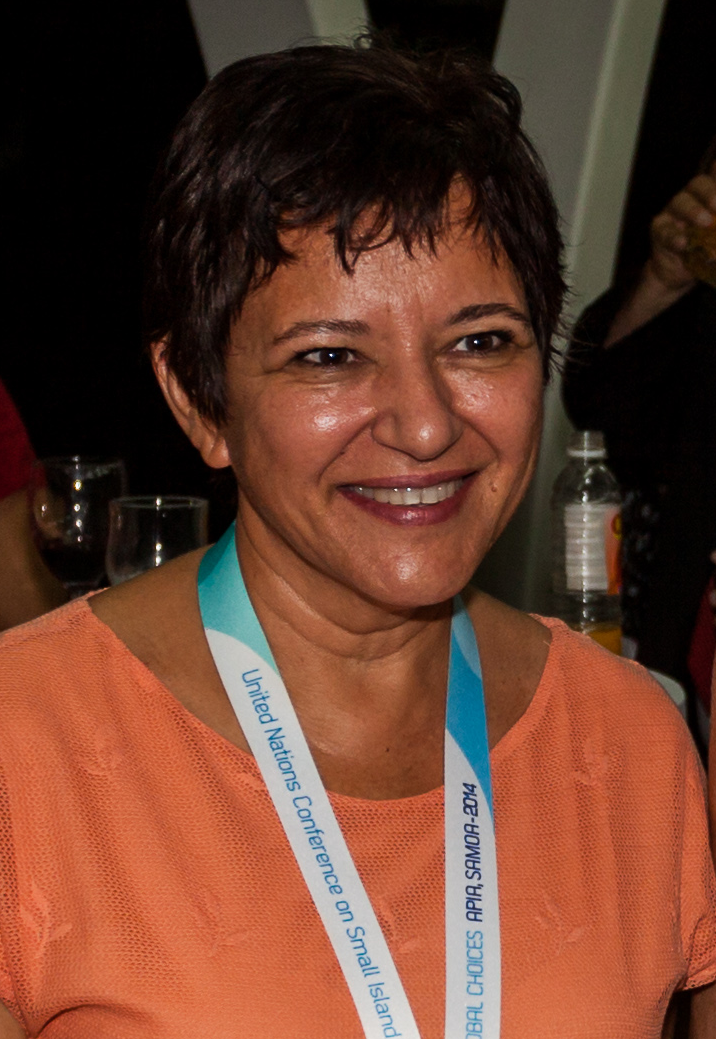

President of the Government of New Caledonia
- In office 5 June 2014 – 1 April 2015
- Preceded by: Harold Martin
- Succeeded by: Philippe Germain

President of the Provincial Assembly of South Province
- In office 20 September 2012 – 11 May 2014
- Preceded by: Pierre Frogier
- Succeeded by: Philippe Michel

Personal details
- Born: Cynthia Parage; 15 June 1962 (age 64) Nouméa, New Caledonia
- Party: The Rally (since 2014)
- Other political affiliations: The Rally–UMP (2004–2014); Rally for Caledonia in the Republic (2002–2004)

Cynthia Ligeard (née Parage; born 15 June 1962) is a New Caledonian anti-independence politician. She was the second woman to serve as President of the Government of New Caledonia, a position she held from 5 June 2014 until 1 April 2015. (Marie-Noëlle Thémereau was the first female President of New Caledonia from 2004 to 2007).

== Biography ==
Ligeard was born Cynthia Parage in Nouméa, New Caledonia, on 15 June 1962. She is a caldoche, or New Caledonian of French descent.

The 2014 New Caledonian legislative election were held on 11 May 2014. Cynthia Ligeard was elected President of the Government of New Caledonia by Congress on 5 June 2014. She headed a coalition of anti-independence New Caledonian political parties in Congress. However, Ligeard's government lasted just six months before its collapse in December 2014 due to a dispute between the anti-independence coalition parties over finances and fiscal issues. Philippe Germain of Caledonia Together succeeded her as president on 1 April 2015.
