= Réginald Bernut =

New Caledonian politician (1937–2021)

Reginald Bernut (18 January 1937 – 6 April 2021) was a New Caledonian politician, born in Sydney, Australia.

== Biography ==
Bernut was the son of farmers from La Foa, and through his mother, the nephew of writer Jean Mariotti. Salesman by profession, he started his career in politics as a member of the anti-independence party Rally for New Caledonia in the Republic RPCR, in the town of Le Mont-Dore. There he was Deputy to Mayor Pierre Frogier then 1st Deputy from 1987 to 2001 and then, when the Mayor became President of the Government of New Caledonia and therefore had to give up his role as the Mayor of the town, Bernut succeeded him. He faced, for almost two years from 2001 to 2003, clashes between the Melanesians and Wallisians at Saint-Louis.

On 22 October 2003, he announced at a city council meeting his decision to resign from his post as Mayor, following a meeting at the end of July in which 8 out of 10 of his deputies had accused him "of wanting sole management and leadership of the RPCR". He remained however on the municipal council until 2008, when he became closer to Harold Martin, who had been in conflict with the leadership of RPCR since 2001. When he became closer to other dissidents from this political movement they formed an electoral alliance which became the Future Together party for the 2004 provincial elections of New Caledonia, Bernut joined them and was elected on 9 May 2004 as councillor for the Southern Province and a member of the Congress under the auspices of this new political party. He became Chairman of the Committee on Rural Development for the Province. For the Municipal elections in 2008, he was not nominated by his party in Mont-Dore; who supported instead Vergès Xavier, former head of organisation and integration in the town who then proposed to form a joint single party: Future Together. The militants ultimately preferred Jean-Yves Maléjac, outgoing councilman and dissident from the RPCR since the end of 2004. He then on the contrary proposed a party of "community agreement" uniting personalities from different political backgrounds.

It was at first announced that Reginald Bernut would be at 5th position of the party list, however finally he preferred to be in 35th and last position. He was therefore not re-elected city councilor in 2008, the outgoing Mayor and head of the RPCR Éric Gay was re-elected in the first round.

Bernut died on 6 April 2021.

== Posts Held ==
=== Congressional Committees ===
- Vice-chairman of the Committee on Public Infrastructure and Energy
- Vice-chairman of the Committee on Sports
- Member of the Committee on organization of transport and communication
- Member of the Committee on Agriculture and Fisheries

=== Committees of the Assembly of the Southern Province ===
- Chairman of Rural Development
- Member of Budget, Finance and Heritage
- Member of the Commission on Economic Development
- Member of the Commission on Utilities, Energy and Transport

=== Appointments ===
- 1st Deputy mayor of Mont-Dore (1987–2001)
- Mayor of Mont-Dore (2001–2003)
- 3rd vice-president of Congress (2004–2007)
