= University of New Caledonia =

French university in New Caledonia

- French: Université de la Nouvelle-Calédonie
- Type: Public Non-sectarian Research higher education institution
- Established: 1987 (UFP) – 1999 (UNC)
- President: Catherine Ris (Gaël Lagadec, 2013–2021)
- Location: Université de la Nouvelle-Calédonie BP R4 – 98851 Nouméa, Nouméa, New Caledonia; 22°16′8″S 166°25′10″E
- Website: unc.nc/en/

The University of New Caledonia UNC (Université de la Nouvelle-Calédonie) is a French university which is part of the Academy of New Caledonia located in Nouméa and Koné.

The university goes back to 1987 when the Université Française du Pacifique (French University of the Pacific) was created, with two centres, one in French Polynesia and the other in New Caledonia. In 1997, the decision was made to split the two parts into separate universities and so in 1999 the Université de la Nouvelle Calédonie and the Université de la Polynésie Française were created.

UNC hosts around 3,000 local and international students with a staff of about 100 professors and researchers and 100 administrative employees each year. The President of UNC since 2021 has been the economist Catherine Ris, who succeeded Gaël Lagadec and Jean-Marc Boyer.

== History ==
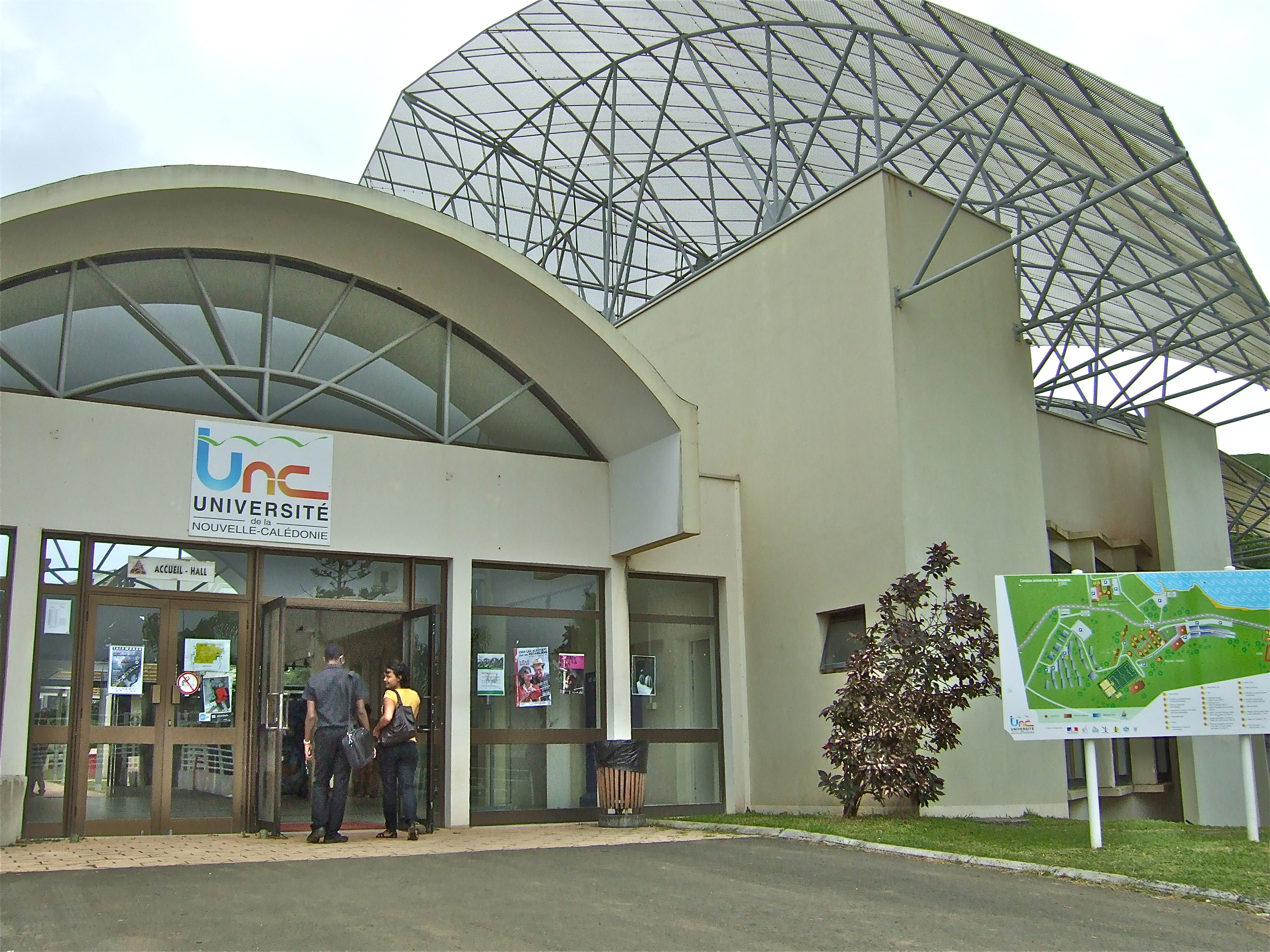
University of New Caledonia, Nouville campus.

UNC was initially a component of the Université Française du Pacifique (French University of the Pacific) founded in 1987 along with another center in French Polynesia. Between 1992 and 1995, the university expanded in Nouville, one of the neighborhoods of Nouméa, where the Department of Sciences and Techniques and the administrative services are located. Since then, the Department of Law, Economy and Management is located in Les Anciens Ateliers du Bagne (The Old Penal Colony Workshops) in Nouville.

In 1994, a residence was built on the UNC campus to accommodate students and it was expanded in 2003 to make lodgings available to international students. In 2006, the French Government funded an extension of the Nouville campus and the former Magenta campus in Nouméa was closed in 2012.

On May 1, 2009, the Institut Universitaire de Formation des Maîtres (University Institute for Teacher Training) of New Caledonia, which had been created in 1990, was incorporated into UNC. It also covers Wallis and Futuna Territory. The goal of the institute is to offer education including specific features found in French Overseas Departments and Territories to primary and secondary school teachers in New Caledonia.

Thanks to the support of the French Government and the Government of New Caledonia, UNC has grown considerably. Several structures were built at the Nouville campus to accommodate athletes who participated in the 2011 Pacific Games:

- a gymnasium
- a new residence of 500 rooms
- an extension to host professors and students from the Magenta campus

An antenna campus in the northern town of Koné was opened on the 17th of July 2020, after two years in temporary buildings, to attract and serve students from the northern part of Grande Terre or distant from Noumea. There are similar arrangements with Lifou island and in Wallis-et-Futuna.

== Academics ==
UNC is composed of a Doctoral School, an institute and four departments. 13 Bachelor's degrees, 4 Master's degrees and 10 Diplomas are offered at UNC as well as preparation for the competitive entrance examinations for medical school and the teachers' college. UNC also offers distance learning for off-campus students with the participation of the Centre National d'Enseignement à Distance (French National Center for Distance Education).

=== Department of Law, Economy & Management ===
This department is run by Étienne Cornut, a professor in civil law, and is based at the Nouville campus. Four bachelor's degrees are available from UNC's Department of Law, Economy & Management:

- Bachelor of Law, Economy & Management: majoring in Law
- Bachelor of Law, Economy & Management: majoring in Economy and Management
- Professional Bachelor of Law, Economy & Management: majoring in Business
- Professional Bachelor of Law, Economy & Management: majoring in Accounting and Management

The department signed agreements with the Lycée du Grand Nouméa (Greater Noumea High School) located in Dumbéa in order to offer a combined bachelor and post-secondary preparatory class for the entrance to École normale supérieure Paris-Saclay, a prestigious university in Cachan, France.

=== Department of Literature, Languages & Humanities ===
The Dean of UNC's Department of Literature, Languages & Humanities is Patrice Christophe (2023), and its administrative offices are located at Nouville. UNC students can choose from among the following four undergraduate degrees at the Department of Literature, Languages & Humanities:

- Bachelor of Arts, Literature & Languages: majoring in English
- Bachelor of Arts, Literature & Languages: majoring in Regional Languages, Literature & Civilizations
- Bachelor of Arts, Literature & Languages: majoring in French Literature
- Bachelor of Humanities & Social Sciences: majoring in Geography and Planning
- Bachelor of Humanities & Social Sciences: majoring in History

Two graduate degrees are also available to students:

- A Professional Master of Humanities & Social Sciences: majoring in Territories and Local Development, Planning and Development of the Pacific Territories (2023)
- A multidisciplinary Research Master of Arts, Literature & Languages: majoring in Arts, Literature & Civilizations

=== Department of Sciences & Techniques ===
The Department of Sciences & Techniques, located on the Nouville campus, is managed by Michael Mayer (2023), a physicist. UNC Department of Sciences & Techniques offers five undergraduate degrees:

- Bachelor of Science, Technologies and Health: majoring in Mathematics or IT
- Bachelor of Science, Technologies and Health: majoring in Physics & Chemistry
- Bachelor of Science, Technologies and Health: majoring in Natural & Earth Sciences
- Professional Bachelor in Operating Systems & Software: majoring in Instrumentation and Quality Control

Students can also earn a graduate degree in:

- Master of Science & Technologies: majoring in Environmental Management

The coursework includes lectures in French and in English and is part of the cooperation between UNC, "Institut de recherche pour le développement" (Research Institute for Development), University of Hawaii at Hilo and University of the South Pacific.

Students can complete the "Première Année des Etudes de Santé" (first year of medical sciences) at UNC's Department of Sciences & Techniques. Upon completion of the three trimesters and four competitions included in that first year, students can study for various medical degrees in:

- Internal Medicine at Pierre and Marie Curie University in Paris
- Pharmaceutical Sciences at Paris Descartes University in Châtenay-Malabry
- Dentistry at Paris Descartes University in Montrouge
- Midwifery at Pierre and Marie Curie University in Paris
- Physical Therapy at Saint-Maurice Hospital in Saint-Maurice, Val-de-Marne

Finally, the following four diplomas are available:

- Diploma in Coordinating Physical, Fitness or Cultural Activities
- Diploma in IT Engineering & System Electronics
- Diploma in Applied Earth Sciences: Mining, Water & Environment
- Diploma in Extractive Metallurgy & Metallurgy Engineering

=== Department of Continuing Education ===
UNC's Department of Continuing Education provides training and education for employed students who wish to develop their personal skills. The department can issue six diplomas to graduating students:

- Diploma for Access to University Studies
- Diploma of French as a Foreign or Second Language (intensive)
- Diploma of French as a Foreign or Second Language (non-intensive)
- Diploma in Substance Abuse Prevention and Treatment
- Diploma in Energetics & Production
- Diploma in Publication Trades (Library Science)

=== University Institute for Teacher Training ===
The University Institute for Teacher Training was created in Noumea in 1990 and incorporated into UNC in 2009. At the institute, UNC students can either prepare for the competition to become a primary teacher in New Caledonia or earn a Master's in Educational Professions.

=== Doctoral School ===
UNC's Doctoral School is multidisciplinary and provides an opportunity to postgraduate students to conduct their research in an island context. The Doctoral School was created in conjunction with the University of French Polynesia located in Tahiti and is approved by the French Ministry of Higher Education and Research. The Doctoral School is run by Henri Bonnel, a professor of mathematics.

== Research ==
UNC is the reference point for research in New Caledonia and the home of five research teams:

- Centre for New Studies on the Pacific Region
- Computer Studies and Mathematics Research Team
- Laboratory of Economic and Legal Studies
- Island Laboratory of Life Sciences and the Environment
- Multidisciplinary Centre for Earth Sciences and the Environment

The research teams are recognized by the French Ministry of Higher Education and Research and focus on research need for the development of New Caledonia along with expanding cooperation in the Asia-Pacific region.

== Notable people ==
=== Notable alumni ===
- Sonia Backès (born 1976), politician, leader of the Caledonian Republicans party and the President of the Provincial Assembly of South Province
- Didier Poidyaliwane (1966–2022), pro-independence politician

=== Notable faculty ===
- Déwé Gorodey (1949–2022), teacher, writer, feminist and politician

== See also ==
- List of public universities in France by academy
- List of universities in Polynesia
