= Philippe Germain =

French politician

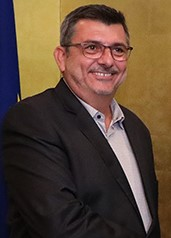

President of the Government of New Caledonia
- In office 1 April 2015 – 5 July 2019
- Vice President: Jean-Louis d'Anglebermes
- Preceded by: Cynthia Ligeard
- Succeeded by: Thierry Santa

Personal details
- Born: 1 January 1968 (age 58) Nouméa, New Caledonia, France
- Party: Caledonia Together

Philippe Germain is a French politician who served as President of the Government of New Caledonia from 2015 to 2019. He was elected to the presidency on 1 April 2015 with a five-year mandate.

== Presidency ==
Before Germain's election on 1 April 2015, the New Caledonian presidency had been legally vacant for more than 100 days, although Cynthia Ligeard stayed on as a "caretaker" while attempting to secure election to a five-year term. Attempts to elect a president and vice president, who must represent both the anti- and pro-independence camps in New Caledonia under the Nouméa Accord, were unsuccessful until three ministers from the pro-independence minority agreed to back Germain. Ligeard accused Germain of "betrayal" and blamed the French government for engineering her defeat. Fifteen members of Congress and three government ministers boycotted Germain's first policy address as president, during which he spoke for two hours and talked about New Caledonia's capacity to govern itself if voters choose independence in an upcoming referendum.

Within weeks of taking office, Germain fired the assistants of Ligeard and two other government ministers, although they were swiftly reinstated by court order. Germain and Ligeard also clashed over the former's decision to forgive a $26 million debt owed by the Kanak-owned mining company SMSP in April 2015, with Ligeard denying that her government had previously agreed to the concession as Germain claimed.
