= Thierry Santa =

French politician in New Caledonia

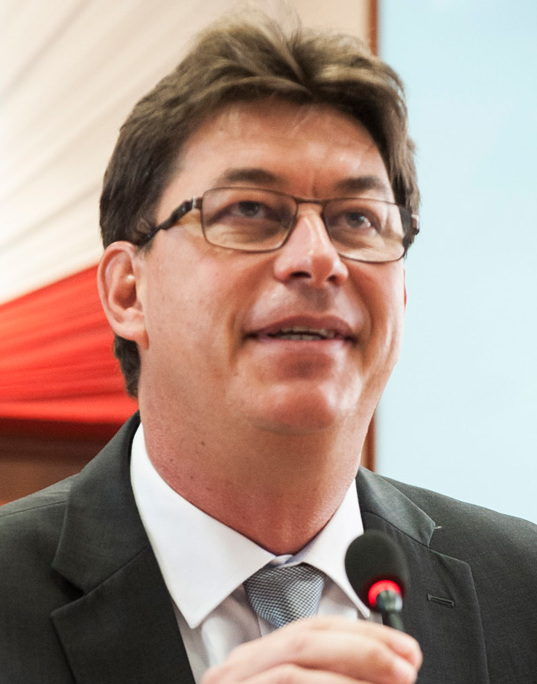

9th President of the Government of New Caledonia
- In office 6 July 2019 – 22 July 2021
- Vice President: Gilbert Tyuienon
- Preceded by: Philippe Germain
- Succeeded by: Louis Mapou

President of The Rally
- In office 5 December 2018 – 20 April 2024
- Preceded by: Pierre Frogier
- Succeeded by: Alcide Ponga

President of the Congress of New Caledonia
- In office 17 July 2015 – 30 July 2018
- Preceded by: Gaël Yanno
- Succeeded by: Gaël Yanno

Personal details
- Born: 29 August 1967 (age 59) Papeete, French Polynesia
- Party: The Rally (New Caledonia); The Republicans (France)
- Spouse: Sabine Di Russo
- Education: University of Bordeaux

Thierry Santa (born 29 August 1967) is a French politician who served as the 9th President of the Government of New Caledonia from 2019 to 2021. He served as the leader of The Rally political party from 2018 to 2024. He previously served as President of the Congress of New Caledonia from 2015 to 2018.

== Early life and education ==
Born on 29 August 1967 in Papeete, Santa is the son of Tugdual Santa (born 1943 in Papeete), through whom he descends from notable families of Tahiti and Irène Degage (born 1945), a former civil servant of the Office of Posts and Telecommunications (OPT) in Tahiti then responsible for the social grocery store of the Red Cross in Raiatea.

After his parents divorced, he spent most of his childhood between school periods in Tahiti where he continued to reside with his mother and vacations in Thio in New Caledonia with his father. He then studied in Bordeaux, at the former Université Bordeaux-I, from which he graduated with a master's degree in economic sciences and a specialized higher studies diploma (DESS) in business administration. Once he graduated in 1991, he did his national service as a technical aid volunteer (VAT) in the service of the finances of the town hall of Nouméa, and then settled permanently in New Caledonia.

== Political career ==
He became head of the finance department of the town hall of Nouméa until 2000. His political career started in 2000, when Pierre Frogier, then deputy, mayor of Mont-Dore and successor potential of Jacques Lafleur at the head of the historic party of the loyalist right, recruited him on 12 June as secretary general of the town hall of this commune in the suburbs of Nouméa. It was that same year that he joined the party. Pierre Frogier became president of the government of New Caledonia and resigning from his mandate as mayor on 31 March. His relations with the new chief magistrate, Réginald Bernut, were worse.

He left this function within the municipal administration to become a collaborator of Corinne Fuluhea, member of The Rally of the local executive responsible for Vocational Training, until 3 October. He then became project manager for the Budget and Financial Affairs Directorate (DBAF) of the government, then returned to his position as secretary general of the town of Mont-Dore to the new mayor, Éric Gay, himself a close friend of Pierre Frogier. He then participated in the reorganization of the municipal administration and the preparation of the urban redevelopment of Boulari.

=== President of the Rally ===
Once again an elected official of the opposition, Santa, who had left the general secretariat of The Rally in Virginie Ruffenach, rejoined the structure. He succeeded Pierre Froglier following the 2018 independence referendum on an interim basis. For the 2019 provincial elections, he allied himself with the Caledonian Republicans in an electoral coalition called, Les Loyalistes forming a tandem with Sonia Backès to lead the list in South Province, the latter taking first place and him second. The coalition also became a political group at the Congress, and Thierry Santa took over as president. They achieved victory with 20 seats out of 40 in the Provincial Assembly, and became the first group of the Congress, with 18 seats out of 54. He was succeeded by Alcide Ponga.

=== President of the Government of New Caledonia ===
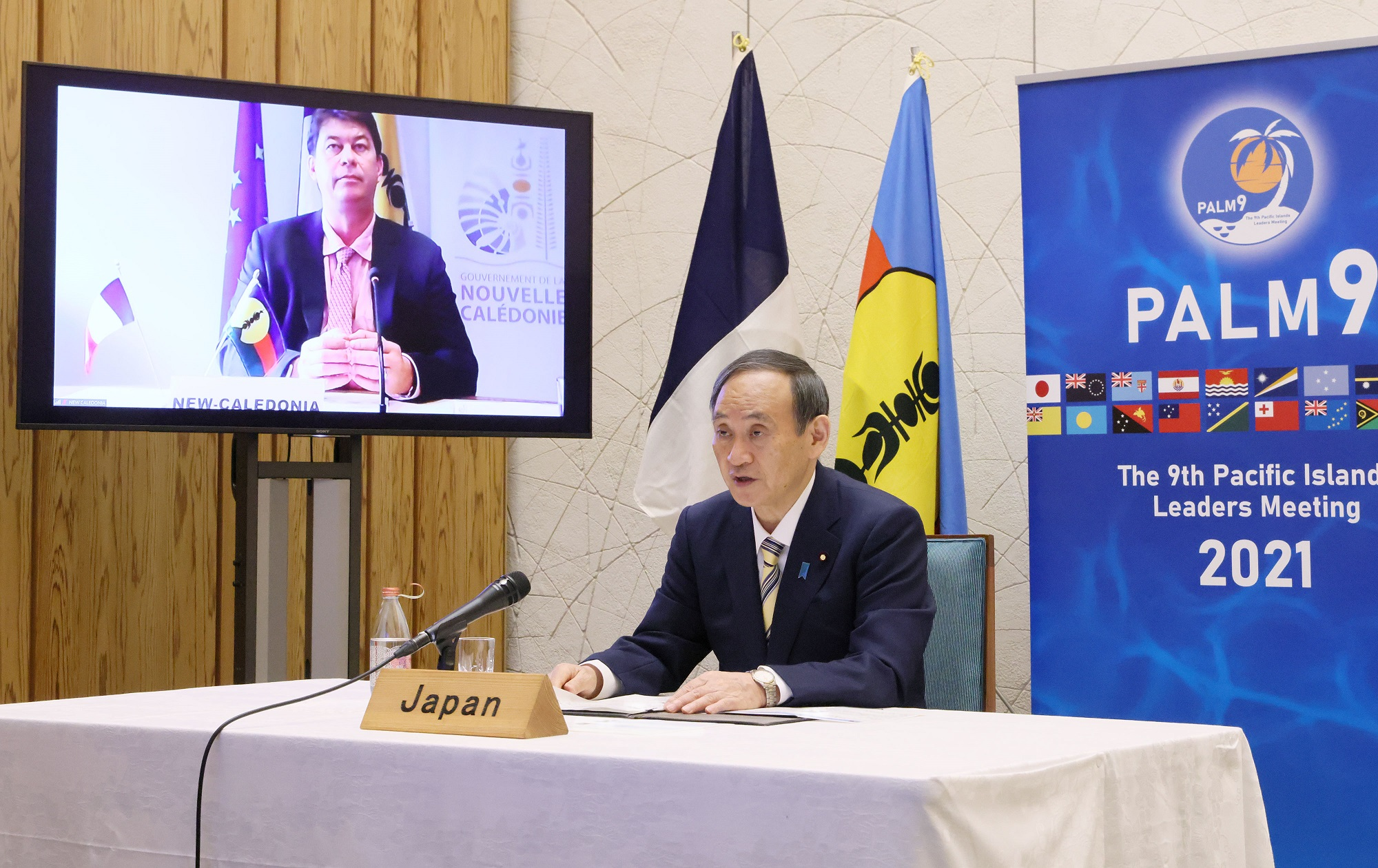
Thierry Santa in videoconference with the Prime Minister Japanese Yoshihide Suga on 1 July 2021.

On 28 June 2019, Thierry Santa was elected president of the government of New Caledonia. He took office on 6 July. On 9 July, he was also responsible for the coordination and control of the sectors of external relations and civil security, tourist promotion, the strategy for the development of natural resources, the mining code and the social accounts within the government. He is government fell apart in 2021.

== Personal life ==
Santa married Sabine Di Russo (born 1 February 1974) on 3 September 2010, the Human Resources Director of the company Nouméa Casinos.
