= Éric Gay =

French politician (born 1958)

Éric Gay (born 7 January 1958, as Eric Caballero in Canala) is a French politician in New Caledonia. He has been mayor of Le Mont-Dore since 2003.
