= New Caledonian independence referendum =

New Caledonian independence referendum may refer to:

- 1987 New Caledonian independence referendum
- 2018 New Caledonian independence referendum
- 2020 New Caledonian independence referendum
- 2021 New Caledonian independence referendum
