= Veylma Falaeo =

New Caledonian politician

- Falaeo in 2024

President of the Congress of New Caledonia
- In office 29 August 2024 – 10 July 2026
- Preceded by: Roch Wamytan
- Succeeded by: Virginie Ruffenach

Member of the Congress of New Caledonia
- Incumbent
- Assumed office May 2019

Personal details
- Born: 24 August 1982 (age 44) Nouméa, New Caledonia
- Party: Oceanian Awakening

Veylma Falaeo (born 24 August 1982) is a New Caledonian politician serving as the President of the Congress of New Caledonia since 29 August 2024. A member of the centrist Oceanian Awakening party, she is the first woman to be president of the congress.

== Biography ==
Falaeo was born on 24 August 1982 in Nouméa, the capital of New Caledonia. Her family comes from Wallis and Futuna and her father was a Nouméa municipal councilman. She is the eldest of three children and grew up in the district of Rivière-Salée. She entered the University of New Caledonia at age 18 where she received two degrees, one in public administration and the other in economics and management.

Falaeo became a civil servant in 2009, first working at the l’Institut de Formation à l'Administration Publique (Public Administration Training Institute, IFAP), then the l’Institut pour le Développement des Compétences en Nouvelle-Calédonie (Institute for the Development of Skills in New Caledonia, IDCNC) and the Direction de la Formation Professionnelle Continue (Continuing Professional Training Department, DFPC). She also worked during this time as a Zumba teacher.

In 2019, Falaeo co-founded the political party L'Éveil océanien (Oceanian Awakening, EO) with Milakulo Tukumuli. The party is centrist and focuses on the rights of Wallisians in New Caledonia. She ran for the Congress of New Caledonia that year as part of the party and won election, being one of three seats won by the party. Although the party only has three of 54 seats in the Congress, it has been called the "party of kingmakers" as it has the ability to give either the pro-independence or anti-independence sides a narrow majority in congress.

Falaeo ran for mayor of Nouméa in 2020, placing fourth with 2,000 votes. In 2022, she became the secretary general of the Oceanian Awakening party. In August 2024, she became a candidate in the election for President of the Congress of New Caledonia after Roch Wamytan was narrowly ousted by a vote of 28–26. She received the support of the anti-independence faction and was elected by one vote over Wamytan. Falaeo became the first woman elected to the position. Her election came in the midst of New Caledonia being in a major unrest between pro- and anti-independence groups, with Falaeo pledging to "pursue a middle-way approach to governance."
