= Le Mont-Dore, New Caledonia =

Commune of New Caledonia

Le Mont-Dore
- Commune
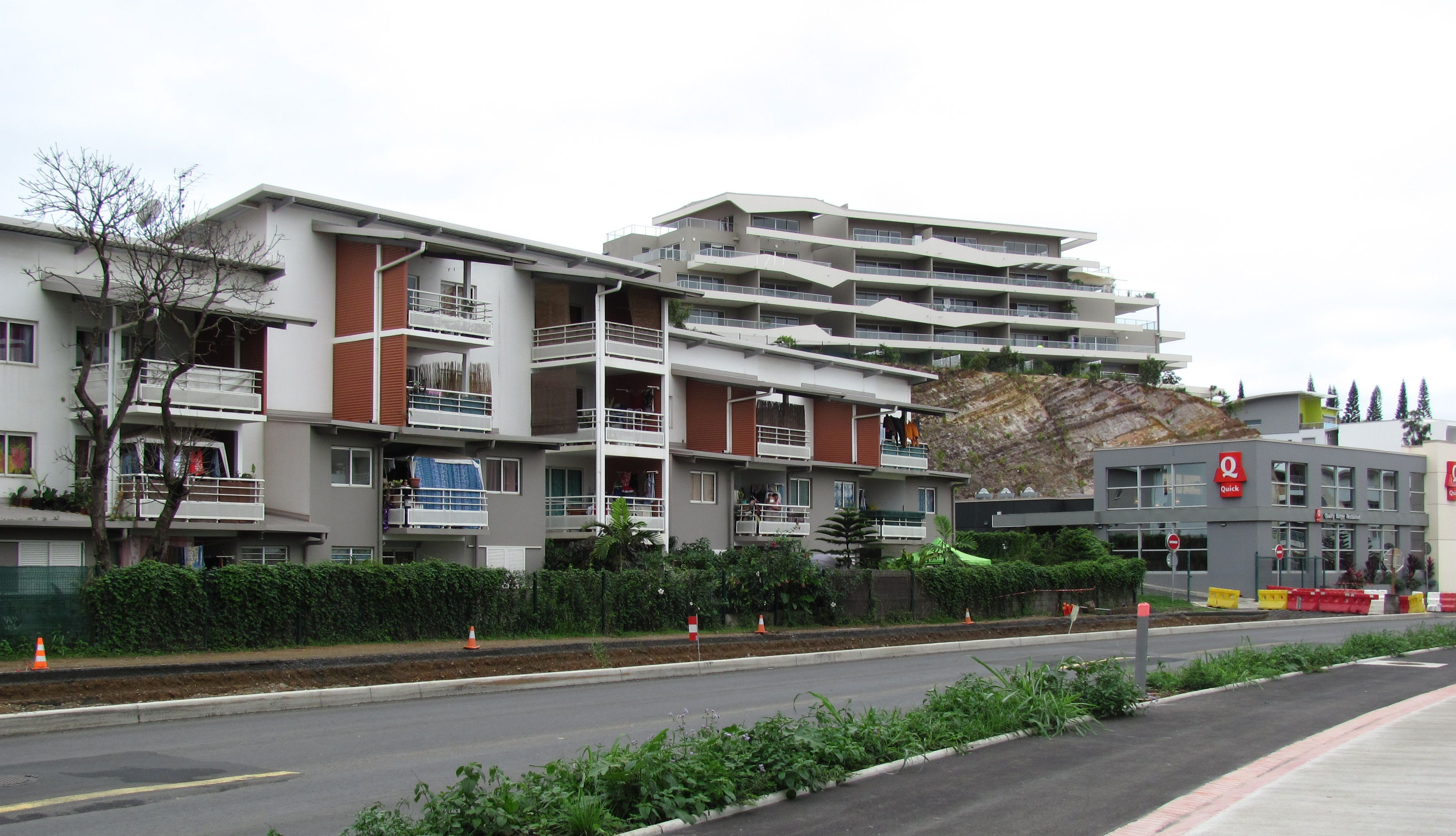
- The High Street, Le Mont-Dore

- Coat of arms

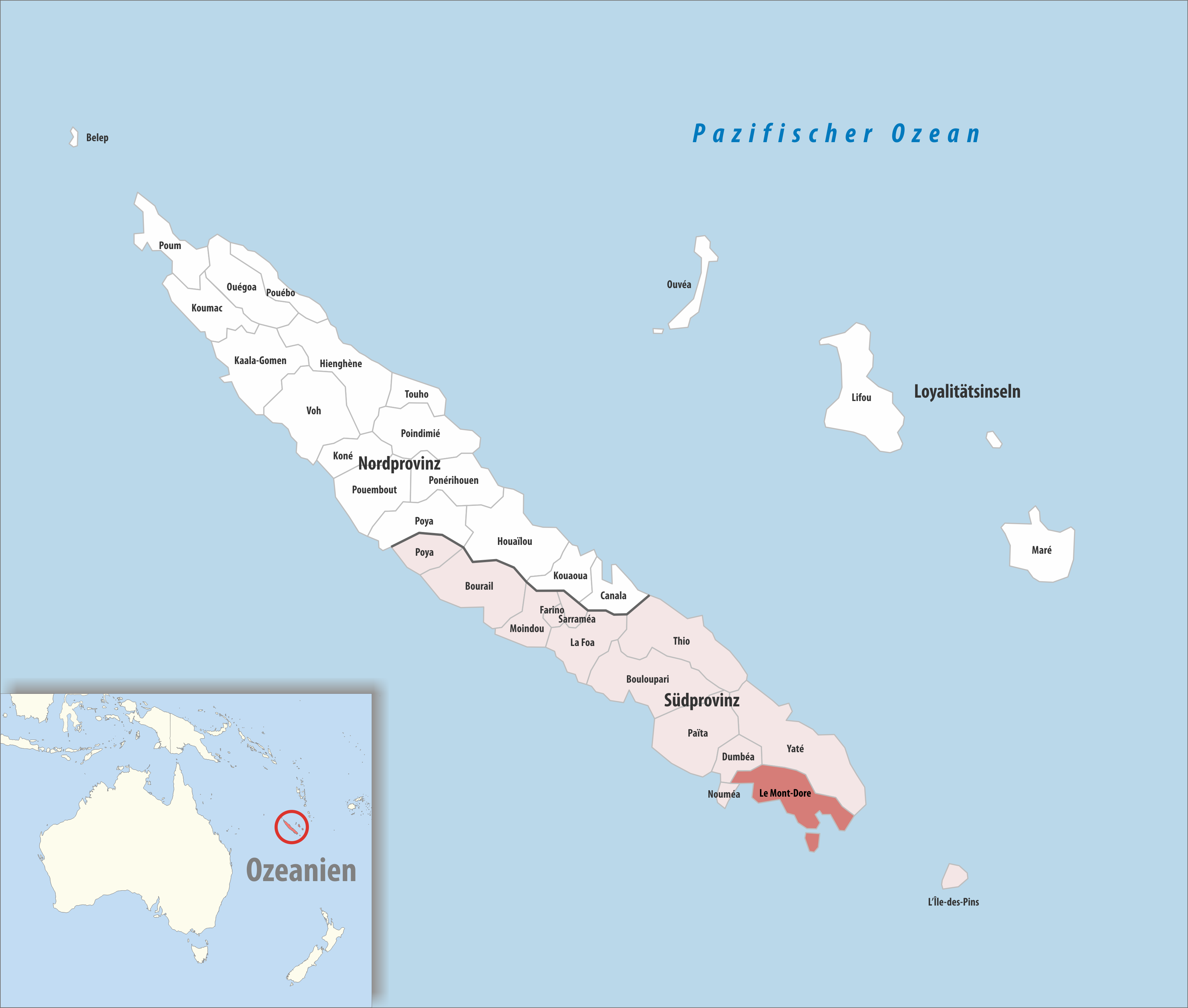
- Location of the commune (in red) within New Caledonia
- Location of Le Mont-Dore
- Coordinates: 22°12′57″S 166°27′59″E
- Country: France
- Sui generis collectivity: New Caledonia
- Province: South Province

Government
  - Mayor (2020–2026): Eddie Lecourieux
- Area^{1}: 643.0 km^{2} (248.3 sq mi)
- Elevation: 20 m (66 ft)
- Highest elevation: 825 m (2,707 ft)
- Lowest elevation: 0 m (0 ft)
- Population (2019): 27,620
  - Density: 42.95/km^{2} (111.3/sq mi)

Ethnic distribution
  - 2019: Europeans 26.36% Kanaks 24.86% Wallisians and Futunans 14.8% Mixed 15.34% Other 18.65%
- Time zone: UTC+11:00
- INSEE/Postal code: 98817 /98809
- ^{1} New Caledonia Land Register (DITTT) data, which exclude lakes and ponds larger than 1 km² (0.386 sq mi or 247 acres) as well as the estuaries of rivers.

Le Mont-Dore (French: [lə mɔ̃ dɔʁ]) is a commune in the suburbs of Nouméa in the South Province of New Caledonia, an overseas territory of France in the Pacific Ocean.

== Geography ==
=== Climate ===
Le Mont-Dore has a tropical rainforest climate (Köppen Af), closely bordering upon a tropical monsoon climate (Am). The average annual temperature in Le Mont-Dore is 23.2 °C (73.8 °F). The average annual rainfall is 1,775.6 mm (69.91 in) with March as the wettest month. The temperatures are highest on average in February, at around 26.6 °C (79.9 °F), and lowest in July, at around 19.5 °C (67.1 °F). The highest temperature ever recorded in Le Mont-Dore was 37.8 °C (100.0 °F) on 29 December 2010; the coldest temperature ever recorded was 7.8 °C (46.0 °F) on 22 August 2009.

Climate data for Le Mont-Dore (La Coulée, 1991−2020 normals, extremes 1993−present)
| Month | Jan | Feb | Mar | Apr | May | Jun | Jul | Aug | Sep | Oct | Nov | Dec | Year |
|---|---|---|---|---|---|---|---|---|---|---|---|---|---|
| Record high °C (°F) | 36.7 (98.1) | 37.7 (99.9) | 36.1 (97.0) | 35.2 (95.4) | 32.1 (89.8) | 31.7 (89.1) | 31.8 (89.2) | 30.8 (87.4) | 35.9 (96.6) | 34.7 (94.5) | 35.8 (96.4) | 37.8 (100.0) | 37.8 (100.0) |
| Mean daily maximum °C (°F) | 31.0 (87.8) | 31.3 (88.3) | 30.3 (86.5) | 28.6 (83.5) | 26.5 (79.7) | 25.1 (77.2) | 24.3 (75.7) | 24.8 (76.6) | 26.6 (79.9) | 28.2 (82.8) | 29.5 (85.1) | 30.8 (87.4) | 28.1 (82.6) |
| Daily mean °C (°F) | 26.3 (79.3) | 26.6 (79.9) | 26.0 (78.8) | 24.3 (75.7) | 22.2 (72.0) | 20.7 (69.3) | 19.5 (67.1) | 19.6 (67.3) | 20.9 (69.6) | 22.6 (72.7) | 24.0 (75.2) | 25.6 (78.1) | 23.2 (73.8) |
| Mean daily minimum °C (°F) | 21.5 (70.7) | 22.1 (71.8) | 21.8 (71.2) | 20.1 (68.2) | 17.8 (64.0) | 16.2 (61.2) | 14.6 (58.3) | 14.5 (58.1) | 15.3 (59.5) | 17.0 (62.6) | 18.5 (65.3) | 20.3 (68.5) | 18.3 (64.9) |
| Record low °C (°F) | 15.8 (60.4) | 15.7 (60.3) | 16.3 (61.3) | 13.3 (55.9) | 10.4 (50.7) | 9.5 (49.1) | 7.8 (46.0) | 7.8 (46.0) | 8.9 (48.0) | 9.7 (49.5) | 11.8 (53.2) | 13.1 (55.6) | 7.8 (46.0) |
| Average precipitation mm (inches) | 199.3 (7.85) | 248.2 (9.77) | 317.2 (12.49) | 211.0 (8.31) | 140.8 (5.54) | 113.8 (4.48) | 103.9 (4.09) | 103.5 (4.07) | 62.0 (2.44) | 67.2 (2.65) | 79.9 (3.15) | 128.8 (5.07) | 1,775.6 (69.91) |
| Average precipitation days (≥ 1.0 mm) | 13.7 | 14.9 | 16.8 | 15.5 | 14.6 | 12.2 | 12.5 | 10.8 | 7.7 | 8.4 | 7.7 | 10.4 | 145.1 |
Source: Météo-France

== Population ==
Historical population
| Year | Pop. | ±% p.a. |
|---|---|---|
| 1956 | 1,288 | — |
| 1963 | 2,640 | +10.80% |
| 1969 | 4,809 | +10.51% |
| 1976 | 10,659 | +12.04% |
| 1983 | 14,616 | +4.61% |
| 1989 | 16,370 | +1.91% |
| 1996 | 20,780 | +3.47% |
| 2004 | 24,195 | +1.92% |
| 2009 | 25,683 | +1.20% |
| 2014 | 27,155 | +1.12% |
| 2019 | 27,620 | +0.34% |
Source: ISEE

== Twin towns – sister cities ==
Le Mont-Dore is twinned with:

- Arue, French Polynesia
- Bélep, New Caledonia
- Luganville, Vanuatu
- Nuku-Hiva, French Polynesia
- Pouébo, New Caledonia
- Sunshine Coast, Australia
- Yogyakarta, Indonesia

== Notable people ==
- Réginald Bernut, a local politician
- Ilaïsaane Lauouvéa, former member of congress
