= Alcide Ponga =

French politician (born 1975)

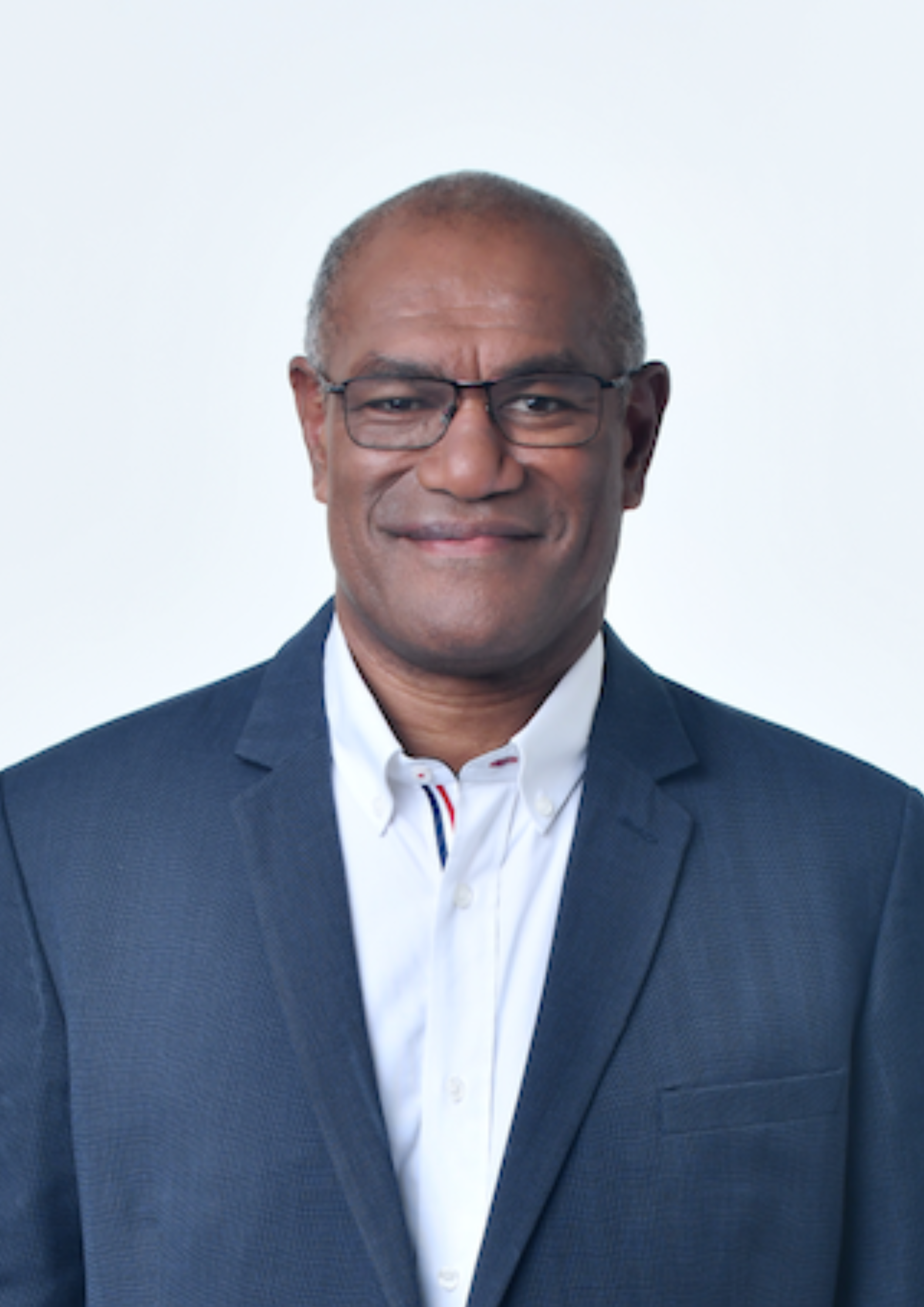

11th President of the Government of New Caledonia
- In office 16 January 2025 – 31 July 2026
- Preceded by: Louis Mapou
- Succeeded by: Milakulo Tukumuli

President of The Rally
- Incumbent
- Assumed office 20 April 2024
- Preceded by: Thierry Santa

Personal details
- Born: 1975 (age 50–51) Kouaoua, New Caledonia
- Party: The Rally (New Caledonia); The Republicans (France)
- Relations: Maurice Ponga (uncle)

Alcide Ponga (born 1975) is a French politician who has served as the President of the Government of New Caledonia since January 2025. He is the president of The Rally since 20 April 2024, and formerly served as mayor of Kouaoua as well as an executive in the nickel mining industry.

A prominent figure in New Caledonian politics, he is known for his support for the territory remaining part of France.

== Early life and education ==
Ponga was born in Kouaoua, in 1975 into a Protestant family of Kanak origin that has been active for decades in New Caledonian local politics. His mother served in local government, and his uncle, Maurice Ponga, was a Member of the European Parliament. His grandparents were active in the fight for Kanak rights, while also supporting New Caledonia remaining part of France.

Ponga earned a master's degree in Political Science from Lycée Lapérouse, laying the foundation for his dual career in both politics and industry.

== Career ==
Before entering full-time politics, Ponga built a career in New Caledonia's vital nickel mining sector. From 2001 to 2010, he held various executive management positions with La Société Le Nickel (SLN). In 2010, he joined Koniambo Nickel SAS, where he served as Director of External Affairs and Institutional Relations until 2024.

Ponga began his political career in local government. In 2014, he was elected Mayor of Kouaoua. He held the position for a decade until resigning in 2024 following his nomination as president of the government. In 2019, Ponga was elected as a member of the Northern Province Assembly. His influence within his party grew steadily, becoming president of The Rally in April 2024. He lost reelection as mayor in the first round of the 2026 local elections.

On 16 January 2025, he was sworn in as President of the Government of New Caledonia, forming a new government following the collapse of the pro-independence government led by Louis Mapou. His leadership has been described as bringing stability following the 2024 unrest and a continuation for New Caledonia to remain within the French Republic.
