= Milakulo Tukumuli =

French politician (born 1984)

Milakuro Tukumuli
- Tukumuli in 2026

12th President of the Government of New Caledonia
- Incumbent
- Assumed office 31 July 2026
- Preceded by: Alcide Ponga

Personal details
- Born: October 19, 1984 (age 42) Thio, New Caledonia
- Party: Oceanian Awakening

Milakulo Tukumuli (born October 19, 1984) is a French politician and the 12th President of the Government of New Caledonia. Tukumuli, who took office as president on July 31, 2026, is the first person of Futunian descent to hold the presidency.
