= Roch Wamytan =

New Caledonia politician

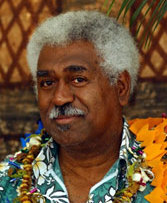

President of the Congress of New Caledonia
- In office 24 May 2019 – 31 August 2024
- Preceded by: Gaël Yanno
- Succeeded by: Veylma Falaeo
- In office 8 August 2013 – 11 May 2014
- Preceded by: Gérard Poadja
- Succeeded by: Gaël Yanno
- In office 19 August 2011 – 29 August 2012
- Preceded by: Léonard Sam
- Succeeded by: Gérard Poadja
- In office 1 April 2011 – 1 August 2011
- Preceded by: Harold Martin
- Succeeded by: Léonard Sam

Personal details
- Born: Roch Wamytan; 13 December 1950 (age 75) Nouméa, New Caledonia
- Party: Caledonian Union

Roch or Rock Wamytan (born 13 December 1950) is a Kanak politician from New Caledonia. He served as President of the Congress of New Caledonia from May 2019 to August 2024, having previously been in the position from 2011 to 2012, and from 2013 to 2014. He was also president of the Kanak and Socialist National Liberation Front.
