= Louis Mapou =

President of the Government of New Caledonia

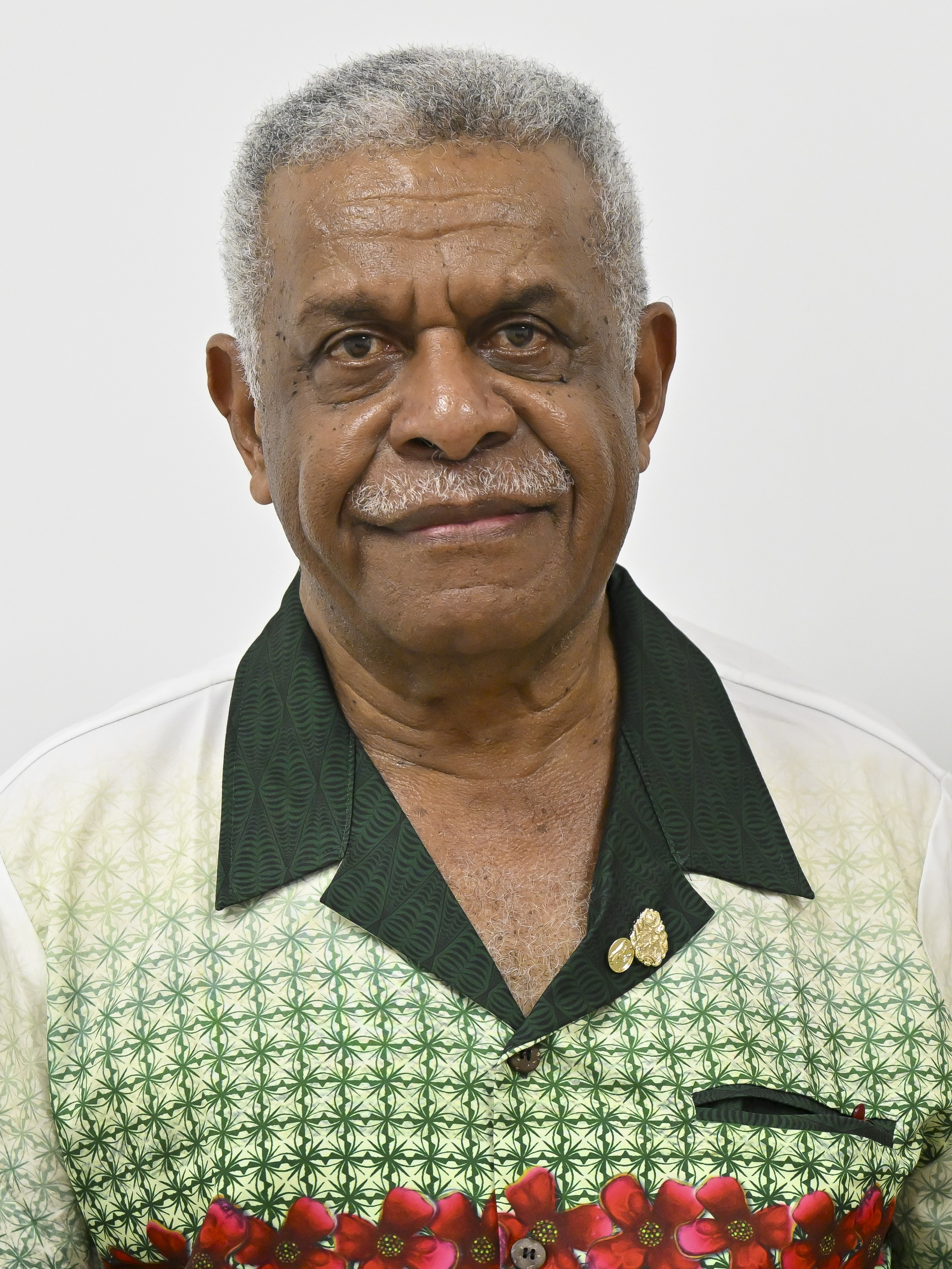
- Mapou at the 53rd Pacific Islands Forum (2024)

10th President of the Government of New Caledonia
- In office 22 July 2021 – 16 January 2025
- Vice President: Isabelle Champmoreau
- Preceded by: Thierry Santa
- Succeeded by: Alcide Ponga

Personal details
- Born: 14 November 1958 (age 68) Unia, Yaté
- Party: National Union for Independence

Louis Mapou (French pronunciation: [lwi mapu]; born 14 November 1958) is a Kanak politician who served as the President of the Government of New Caledonia from 22 July 2021 to 16 January 2025. Mapou was the first native Kanak and pro-independence politician to hold the presidency since the position was established in 1999.

== Early life ==
Louis Mapou was born in Unia, Yaté, New Caledonia, on 14 November 1958. He studied human geography at an university in Nantes and then in Paris in the 1980s.

== Career ==
Mapou was one of the signatories of the Matignon Agreements in 1988. He is a member of the Palika, and was the president of National Union for Independence group in the Congress of New Caledonia from 2014 to 2021. Also he has also been a municipal councillor of Païta from 1995 to 1998 and since 2020. He was director general of New Caledonia's Rural Development and Land Development Agency from 1998 to 2005. From 2005 to 2014, he was director of Eramet and chairman of the board of Koniambo Nickel.

Mapou ran for a seat in the National Assembly from New Caledonia's 2nd constituency in the 2017 election, but lost to Philippe Gomès.

Mapou's election into the office of president of the government in the 2021 snap election was enforced by a panel of French judges, after the 2020 New Caledonian independence referendum and the following unrest resulting in five attempts to annul the formation of a pro-independence government. He was the first Kanak and pro-independence politician to hold the presidency following the Nouméa Accord.

== Works cited ==
=== Books ===
- Waddell, Eric (2008). Jean-Marie Tjibaou, Kanak Witness to the World: An Intellectual Biography. University of Hawaiʻi Press. ISBN 9780824832568.

=== Journals ===
- Chauchat, Mathias (2018). "New Caledonia". The Contemporary Pacific. 30 (2). University of Hawaiʻi Press: 29–37. doi:10.2307/26776162. JSTOR 26776162.
