= President of the Government of New Caledonia =

Head of the executive branch of New Caledonia

President of Government of New Caledonia
- Coat of arms of New Caledonia

- Incumbent; Milakulo Tukumuli since 31 July 2026
- Residence: Nouméa, South Province
- Appointer: Congress of New Caledonia
- Term length: 5 years
- Formation: 28 May 1999
- First holder: Jean Lèques
- Deputy: Vice President of the Government of New Caledonia
- Website: gouv.nc

The president of the Government of New Caledonia (French: Président du gouvernement de la Nouvelle-Calédonie) is the head of the executive branch of the Government of New Caledonia formed in 1999, after the Nouméa Accord was signed in 1998.

New Caledonia has a collegial government with 11 members elected by Congress of New Caledonia with proportional representation on party list voting, according to the rule of the highest average. Then, according to the Nouméa Accord, the 11 members elect President and Vice President among themselves.

== List of officeholders ==
| No. | Portrait | Name (Birth–Death) | Term of office | | | Party |
| No. | Portrait | Name (Birth–Death) | Took office | Left office | Time in office | Party |
|---|---|---|---|---|---|---|
| 1 | | Jean Lèques (1931–2022) | 28 May 1999 | 5 April 2001 | 1 year, 312 days | The Rally |
| 2 | | Pierre Frogier (born 1950) | 5 April 2001 | 10 July 2004 | 3 years, 96 days | The Rally |
| 3 | | Marie-Noëlle Thémereau (born 1950) | 10 July 2004 | 7 August 2007 | 3 years, 28 days | Future Together |
| 4 | | Harold Martin (born 1954) | 7 August 2007 | 5 June 2009 | 1 year, 302 days | Future Together |
| 5 | | Philippe Gomès (born 1958) | 5 June 2009 | 11 March 2011 | 1 year, 279 days | Caledonia Together |
| 6 | | Harold Martin (born 1954) | 11 March 2011 | 5 June 2014 | 3 years, 86 days | Future Together |
| 7 | | Cynthia Ligeard (born 1962) | 5 June 2014 | 1 April 2015 | 300 days | The Rally |
| 8 | | Philippe Germain (born 1968) | 1 April 2015 | 5 July 2019 | 4 years, 95 days | Caledonia Together |
| 9 | | Thierry Santa (born 1967) | 6 July 2019 | 22 July 2021 | 2 years, 16 days | The Rally |
| 10 | | Louis Mapou (born 1958) | 22 July 2021 | 16 January 2025 | 3 years, 178 days | National Union for Independence |
| 11 | | Alcide Ponga (born 1975) | 16 January 2025 | 31 July 2026 | 1 year, 196 days | The Rally |
| 12 | | Milakulo Tukumuli | 31 July 2026 | Incumbent | 38 days | Oceanian Awakening |

== Timeline ==
This is a graphical lifespan timeline of presidents of the Government of New Caledonia. They are listed in order of office (Martin is shown in order of his first presidency).

== See also ==
- Politics of New Caledonia
- High Commissioner of the Republic in New Caledonia
