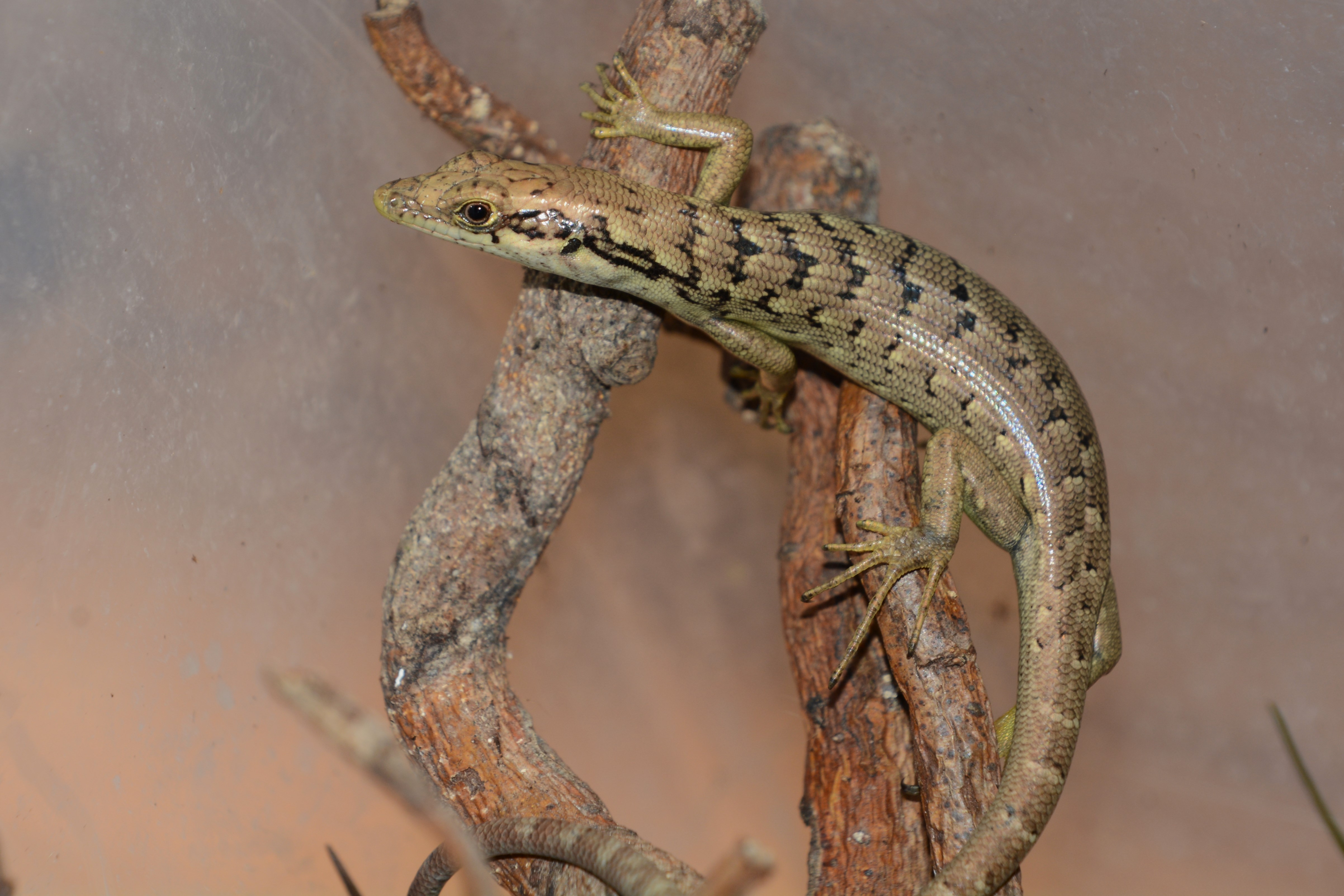

Conservation status
- Least Concern (IUCN 3.1)

Scientific classification
- Kingdom: Animalia
- Phylum: Chordata
- Class: Reptilia
- Order: Squamata
- Family: Scincidae
- Genus: Epibator
- Species: E. nigrofasciolatus

Binomial name
- Epibator nigrofasciolatus (Peters, 1869)

Synonyms
- Lygosoma (Mocoa) nigrofasciolatum Peters, 1869; Epibator nigrofasciolatum (Peters, 1869); Lioscincus nigrofasciolatum (Peters, 1869); Lygosoma nigrofasciolatum (Peters, 1869); Leiolopisma nigrofasciolatum (Peters, 1869); Lygosoma arborum Bavay, 1869; Gongylus arborum (Bavay, 1869); Lygosoma deplanchei Bocage, 1873

= Epibator nigrofasciolatus =

Species of lizard

Epibator nigrofasciolatus, the green-bellied tree skink, is a species of lizard belonging to the subfamily Eugongylinae in the family Scincidae, the skinks. This skink is endemic to New Caledonia.

== Taxonomy ==
Epibator nigrofasciolatus was first formally described in 1869 as Lygosoma (Mocoa) nigrofasciolatum by the German zoologist Wilhelm Peters with its type locality given as New Caledonia. It was formerly included in the genus Lioscincus but in 2015 Ross Allen Sadlier, Aaron M. Bauer, Glenn M. Shea and Sarah A. Smith found that Lioscincus was polyphyletic and proposed three additional new genera, one of which was Epibator, with this species being designated as the type species of the new genus. This genus is classified within the subfamily Eugongylinae in the family Scincidae.

== Description ==
Epibator nigrofasciolatus has a moderately elongated body, with long limbs and digits and a moderately long tail. It has a snout–vent length that reaches 112 mm (4.4 in), with a tail length of 145 mm (5.7 in). The back is midbrown with a greyish tinge marked with vague light and dark flecks scattered over the front of the body, but the marking line up to form r=transverse bands acroos the rear of the body. The nape may have a darkk longitudinal bar which may extend to the middle of the back. The head is typically a uniform coppery-brown colour head coppery, although there may be dark markings on the scale margins. The upper flanks have wide, dark streaks running from the eye over the ear and continuing towards the front legsThe underside of the body and tail as well as the legs and the soles of the feet are lime green.

== Distribution and habitat ==
Epibator nigrofasciolatus is endemic to New Caledonia, where it is widespread on occurs Grande Terre, as well as on Iles Belep, Ile des Pins, Maré, Lifou and Ouvéa in the Iles Loyauté, plus many smaller satellite islands. This sking can be found up to 1,000 m (3,300 ft) above sea level in a wide range of open and wooded habitats, including habitats created by or extensively altered by humans, from mangroves to closed forest.

== Behaviour ==
Epibator nigrofasciolatus is a diurnal skink which can be both arboreal and terrestrial, preferring to be active on sunny days. It hides in under stones, in crevices and holes in soil, rock and trees, and under loose bark. It hunts from the ground up into the canopy. It is usually found basking rocks and trees. It is an oviparous species.
