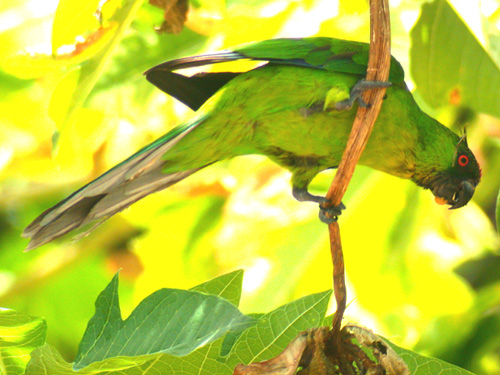
- On north Ouvéa Island, New Caledonia

Conservation status
- Vulnerable (IUCN 3.1)

Scientific classification
- Kingdom: Animalia
- Phylum: Chordata
- Class: Aves
- Order: Psittaciformes
- Family: Psittaculidae
- Genus: Eunymphicus
- Species: E. uvaeensis

Binomial name
- Eunymphicus uvaeensis (Layard, EL & Layard, ELC, 1882)

Synonyms
- Eunymphicus cornutus uvaeensis

= Ouvea parakeet =

Species of bird

The Ouvea parakeet (Eunymphicus uvaeensis) or Uvea parakeet, is a species of parrot in the genus Eunymphicus, in the family Psittaculidae. It is endemic to the island of Uvea, including Faiava Island in the Loyalty Islands, New Caledonia. The species was once considered conspecific with the horned parakeet of Grande Terre, but they have now been split into two species.

== Description ==
The Ouvea parakeet is a medium-sized parakeet with mostly green plumage and a prominent green crest. The crest is composed of six backward feathers that curl forwards. The underside of the bird tends to be yellower and there is bright blue on the wings and tail. The face is dark and the beak is black, lacking the yellow on the face of the horned parakeet.

== Diet ==
The species has a preference for natural forests and laurel forest habitat while avoiding coconut plantations and coastal vegetation. They are active in the early morning and late afternoon, and avoid activity during the heat of the day. They feed on a variety of foods, with figs of the genus Ficus being particularly important.

== Reproduction ==
The breeding season of the Uvea parakeet is from August to January. The nests are located in natural cavities in native trees, with Syzygium and Mimusops accounting for 90% of nesting trees. Three (occasionally two) eggs are laid in these cavities and incubated for 21 days. The nestling period is around 43 days, with an average of around 1.5 chicks being fledged per nesting attempt. Fledging survival is lower, however, with around 0.75 chicks surviving a month after fledging. The main causes of chick mortality are starvation (most common in the smallest, weakest chick), brown goshawk predation and human collecting (for the pet trade).

== Status ==
It once ranged across the other Loyalty Islands; attempts to reintroduce it to Lifou in 1925 and 1963 failed. One source reports that the reintroduced birds simply flew back to Uvea. Studies of potential nesting success on the two islands showed that future reintroductions to Lifou would fail unless the ship rat population is controlled. It is threatened by habitat loss and the pet trade. Around 30-50% of its habitat has been lost in the last thirty years. Collection for the pet trade not only reduces the number of birds but the collection method, which involves cutting trees open to get at the chicks, renders the nesting sites useless for future breeding attempts and lack of breeding cavities may be limiting the population. In the event that ship rats were to reach Uvea it would be at greater risk of extinction. The parakeet is listed in Appendix I of CITES and the IUCN considers the conservation status as Vulnerable. This species is threatened because of low numbers, a limited home range and habitat loss. However, in recent years, community involvement in saving the species have contributed to significant gains in increasing the Ouvea parakeet population from an estimated 617 in 1993 to 2,090 in 2009.
