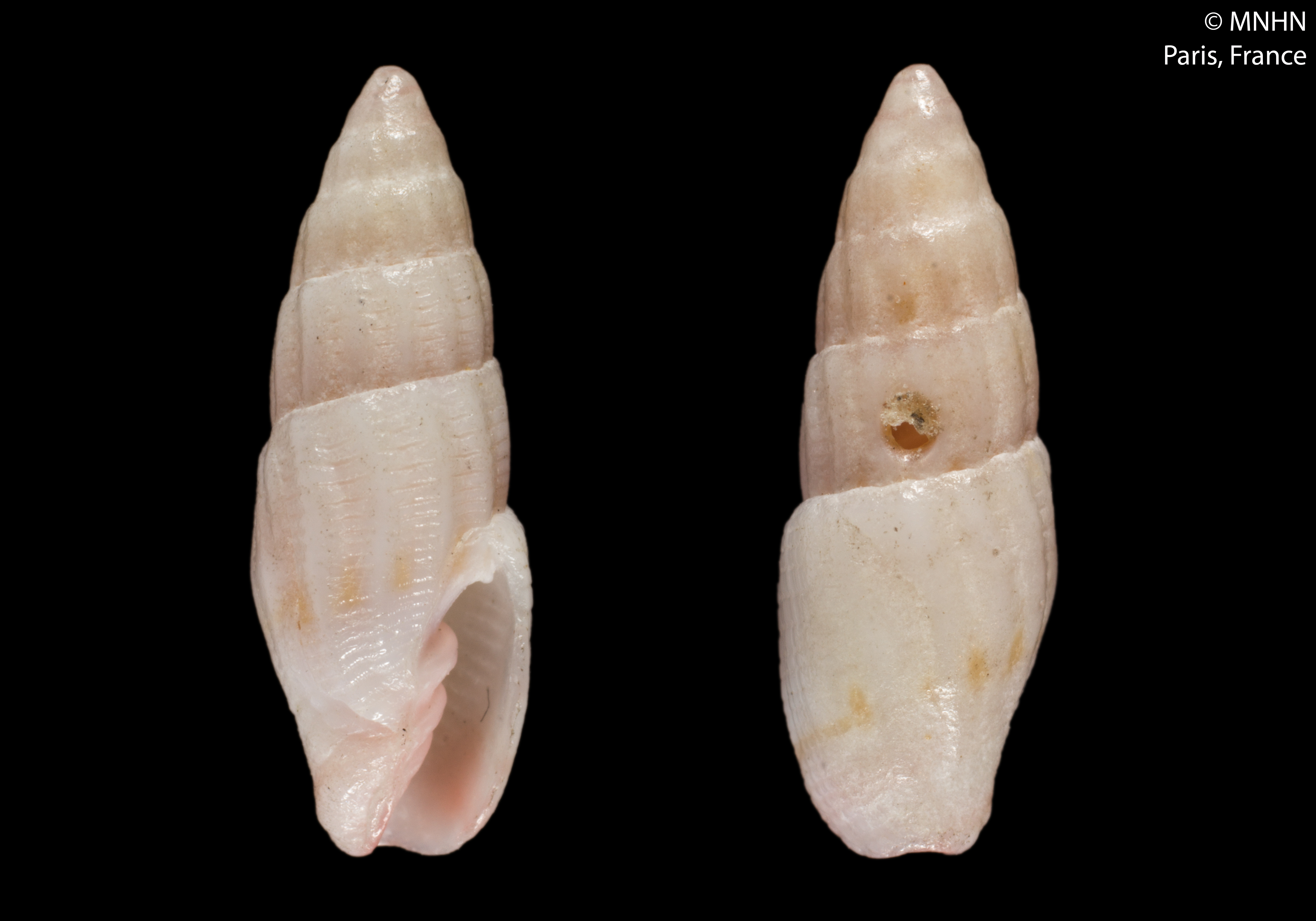
- Shell of Vexillum verecundulum (lectotype at MNHN, Paris)

Scientific classification
- Kingdom: Animalia
- Phylum: Mollusca
- Class: Gastropoda
- Subclass: Caenogastropoda
- Order: Neogastropoda
- Superfamily: Turbinelloidea
- Family: Costellariidae
- Genus: Vexillum
- Species: V. verecundulum

Binomial name
- Vexillum verecundulum (Hervier, 1897)

Synonyms
- Mitra (Costellaria) verecundula Hervier, 1897 (original combination); Vexillum (Costellaria) verecundulum (Hervier, 1897)

= Vexillum verecundulum =

Species of mollusc

Vexillum verecundulum is a species of small sea snail, marine gastropod mollusk in the family Costellariidae, the ribbed miters.

== Description ==
The length of the shell attains 10 mm.

== Distribution ==
This marine species occurs off Guam and Lifou, Loyalty Islands.
