= Faiava Island =

Pacific island of New Caledonia

Coordinates: 20°42′33″S 166°28′10″E

Faiava Island (also known as Wasaü) is one of the Loyalty Islands, in the archipelago of New Caledonia, an overseas territory of France in the south Pacific Ocean. The island is part of the commune (municipality) of Ouvéa, in the Loyalty Islands Province of New Caledonia.

Faiava Island lies in the atoll of Ouvéa, several yards off the pass separating Ouvéa Island and Mouli Island. The tiny Faiava Island has a land area of only around 0.2 km^{2} (50 acres). At the 1996 census there were 42 people living on the island.

== Wildlife ==
The Ouvea parakeet is native to Faiava and the Ouvea islands but it is vulnerable due to loss of habitat, other invasive species and illegal collection for the international pet trade.
