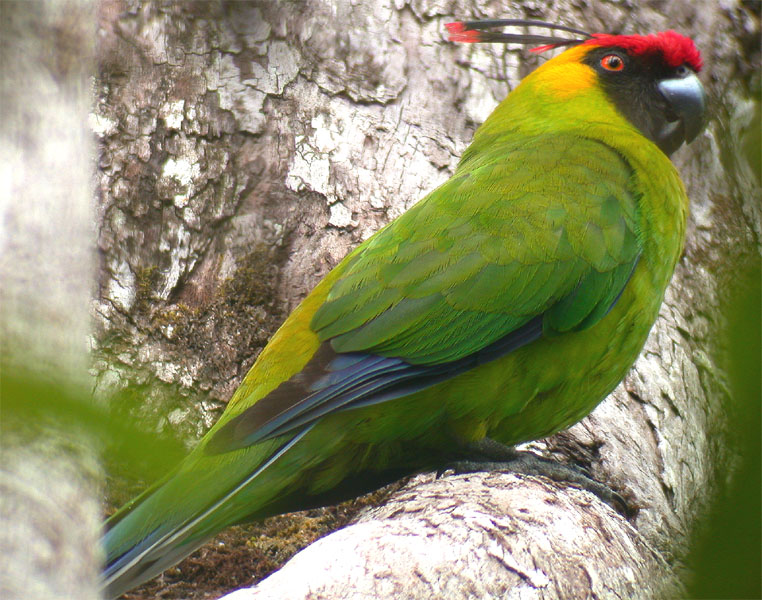
- Horned parakeet (E. cornutus)

Scientific classification
- Kingdom: Animalia
- Phylum: Chordata
- Class: Aves
- Order: Psittaciformes
- Family: Psittaculidae
- Tribe: Platycercini
- Genus: Eunymphicus; Peters, JL, 1937

Type species
- Psittacus cornutus (horned parakeet) Gmelin, JF, 1788

= Eunymphicus =

Genus of birds

Eunymphicus is a genus of parrots in the family Psittaculidae. The genus is endemic to New Caledonia and the Loyalty Islands, and is closely related to the Cyanoramphus parakeets of Oceania.

== Taxonomy ==
The genus Eunymphicus was introduced in 1937 by the American ornithologist James L. Peters with the horned parakeet as the type species. The name combines the Ancient Greek eu meaning "true" and the genus name Nymphicus that had been introduce in 1832 by Johann Georg Wagler for the cockatiel.

The genus now contains two species:

Genus Eunymphicus – Peters, JL, 1937 – two species
Common name	Scientific name and subspecies	Range	Size and ecology	IUCN status and estimated population
Horned parakeet	Eunymphicus cornutus (Gmelin, 1788)	New Caledonia	Size: Habitat: Diet:	VU
Ouvea parakeet	Eunymphicus uvaeensis (E.L. & E.L.C. Layard, 1882)	Ouvéa, Loyalty Islands	Size: Habitat: Diet:	VU

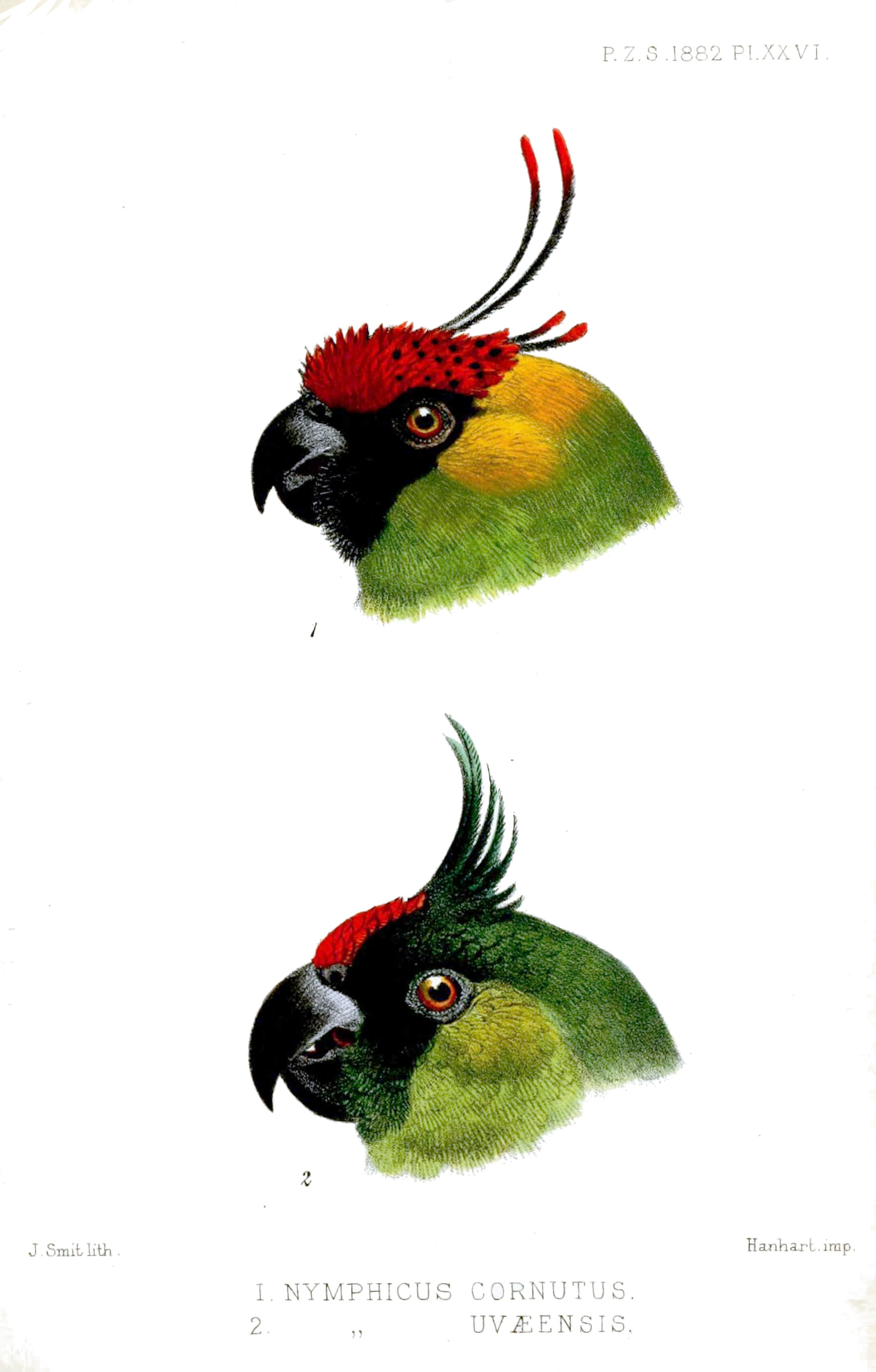
Horned parakeet, Eunymphicus cornutus (above) and Ouvea parakeet, Eunymphicus uvaensis (below)
