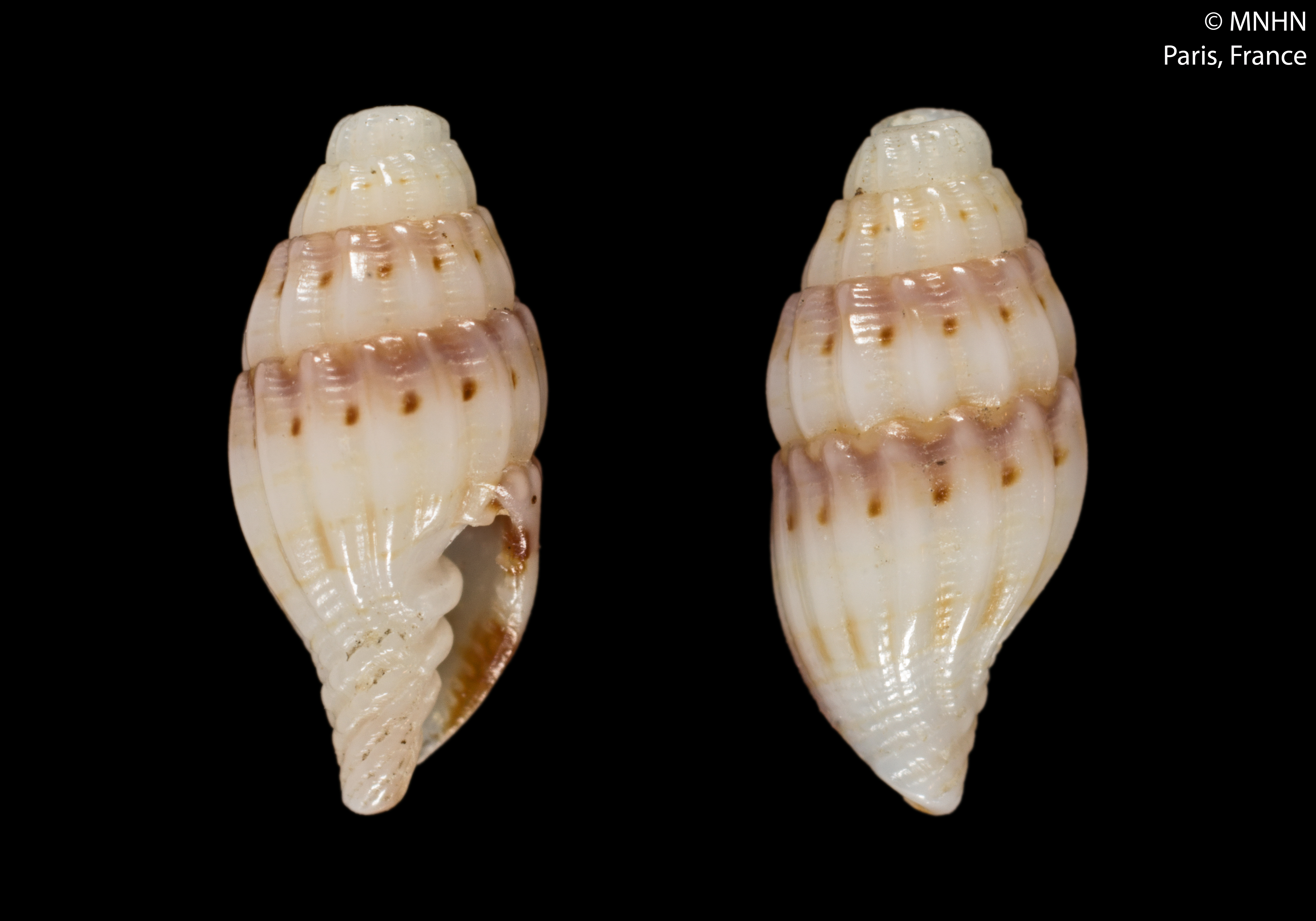
- Lectotype in MNHN.

Scientific classification
- Kingdom: Animalia
- Phylum: Mollusca
- Class: Gastropoda
- Subclass: Caenogastropoda
- Order: Neogastropoda
- Superfamily: Turbinelloidea
- Family: Costellariidae
- Genus: Vexillum
- Species: V. goubini

Binomial name
- Vexillum goubini (Hervier, 1897)

Synonyms
- Mitra (Pusia) goubini Hervier, 1897; Mitra goubini Hervier, 1897 · unaccepted (original combination); Vexillum (Pusia) goubini (Hervier, 1897)

= Vexillum goubini =

Species of gastropod

Vexillum goubini is a species of small sea snail, marine gastropod mollusk in the family Costellariidae, the ribbed miters.

The subspecies Vexillum goubini plurinotata (R.P.J. Hervier, 1897) is a synonym of Vexillum plurinotatum (R.P.J. Hervier, 1897)

== Distribution ==
Its type locality is Lifou, New Caledonia, and it is named in honor of its collector, Benjamin Goubin.
