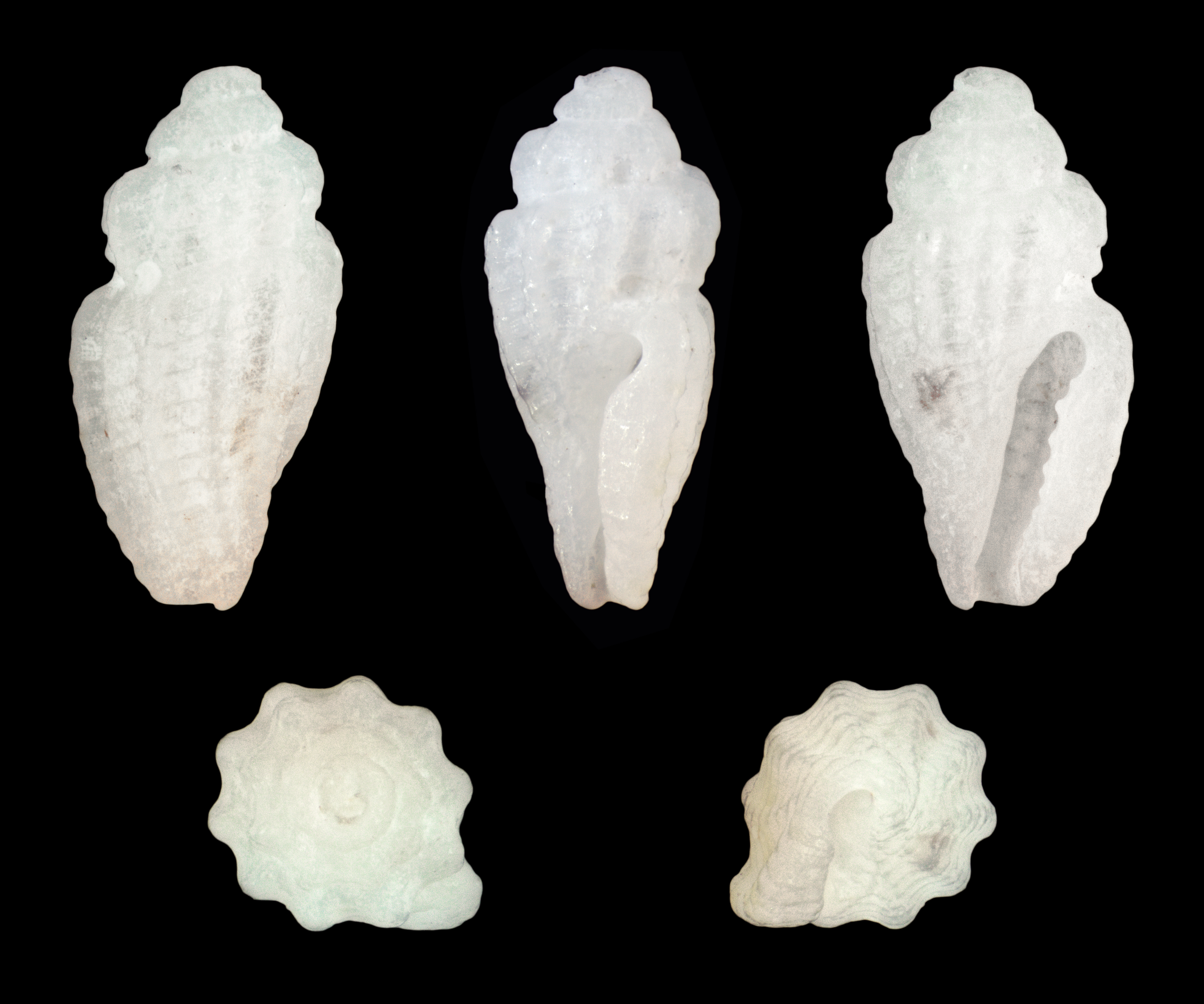
- Shells of Mangelia diatula

Scientific classification
- Kingdom: Animalia
- Phylum: Mollusca
- Class: Gastropoda
- Subclass: Caenogastropoda
- Order: Neogastropoda
- Superfamily: Conoidea
- Family: Mangeliidae
- Genus: Mangelia
- Species: M. diatula

Binomial name
- Mangelia diatula R.P.J. Hervier, 1897

Synonyms
- Mangilia diatula R.P.J. Hervier, 1897

= Mangelia diatula =

Species of gastropod

Mangelia diatula is a species of sea snail, a marine gastropod mollusk in the family Mangeliidae.

== Description ==
The length of the shell attains 5.5 mm, its diameter 2.5 mm.

The white, elongate fusiform shell contains 6- 7 whorls of which 2 in the protoconch. These are intermediary convex with linear sutures, discreetly undulant. The shell shows many longitudinal striae and oblique ribs. It shows manyrounded ribs, 12-146 in the penultimate whorl and 10-12 on the body whorl. The body whorl measures about 3/5 of the total length. The rather narrow aperture is elongate. The outer lip is flexuously arcuate and incrassate on the outside and the inside. The round sinus lies deep under the suture. The siphonal canal is very short and wide.

== Distribution ==
This marine species occurs off Lifou, New Caledonia, and off the Philippines;
