= Daphnella galactosticta =

Scientific classification
- Kingdom: Animalia
- Phylum: Mollusca
- Class: Gastropoda
- Subclass: Caenogastropoda
- Order: Neogastropoda
- Superfamily: Conoidea
- Family: Raphitomidae
- Genus: Daphnella
- Species: D. galactosticta

Binomial name
- Daphnella galactosticta Hervier, 1897

Species of gastropod

Daphnella galactosticta is a species of sea snail, a marine gastropod mollusk in the family Raphitomidae.

This is a taxon inquirendum.

== Distribution ==
This marine species occurs off New Caledonia and off Lifou, Loyalty Islands.
