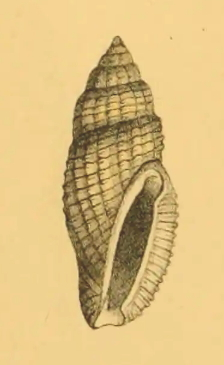
- Original imaghe of a shell of Mangelia isodoma

Scientific classification
- Kingdom: Animalia
- Phylum: Mollusca
- Class: Gastropoda
- Subclass: Caenogastropoda
- Order: Neogastropoda
- Superfamily: Conoidea
- Family: Mangeliidae
- Genus: Mangelia
- Species: M. isodoma

Binomial name
- Mangelia isodoma R.P.J. Hervier, 1897

Synonyms
- Mangilia isodoma R.P.J. Hervier, 1897

= Mangelia isodoma =

Species of gastropod

Mangelia isodoma is a species of sea snail, a marine gastropod mollusk in the family Mangeliidae.

== Description ==
The length of the shell attains 5 mm, its diameter is 2 mm.

(Original description in French) The shell is small and oval in shape, with a short scalariform spire. The shell is of a crystalline white color, very slightly tinged with yellow, and it shows alternating matte and glossy areas caused by the waviness of the descending cords, which are polished and lustrous. Numerous rounded, rather thin longitudinal ribs descend obliquely from the suture, where they originate, and leave interspaces equal to their width; on the body whorl, they bend flexuously toward the basal canal, where they tend to group their concentric arcs.

Many elevated, thin, and shiny transverse cords run across the whorls and overlie the ribs, and the interspaces between them carry numerous much finer striae that are visible only under magnification. The shell has six whorls. The two embryonic whorls are rounded, smooth, and milky white. The intermediate whorls are short and distinctly separated by a subcanaliculate suture. The penultimate whorl is twice as high as the preceding one and shows a plano-convex profile, being subrounded and angular above and compressed at the base by the lower suture. The body whorl is elongated and occupies more than half of the total shell height; it becomes only briefly angular a little below the suture and extends toward the base in a plano-convex profile, with a slight depression below the middle.

The aperture is narrowly elongated and oblique, with a continuous peristome. Through transparency, it reveals a shiny lattice on a matte white background. The oblique columella is smooth and joins the outer lip by a projecting callus. In frontal view, the outer lip is obliquely convex and briefly angular near the suture; in the plane of the aperture, it is arched and undergoes a double retreat toward the sinus and the canal. It is strongly thickened on the last ribbing and is delicately chiseled on the rib of the accompanying wing by numerous growth striae, whose intersection with the descending cords produces a very fine granulate network. The lip is sharp-edged, and the interior is smooth. A weak tubercle is present at the entrance to the sinus. Situated at the angulation of the whorl, the sinus is deep, rounded, and obliquely cut into the retreat of the lip.

== Distribution ==
This marine species occurs off Lifou, New Caledonia.
