= St. Anne Chapel, Inagoj =

Coordinates: 21.0136°S 167.3788°E

St. Anne Chapel
- Chapelle Saint-Anne d'Inagoj
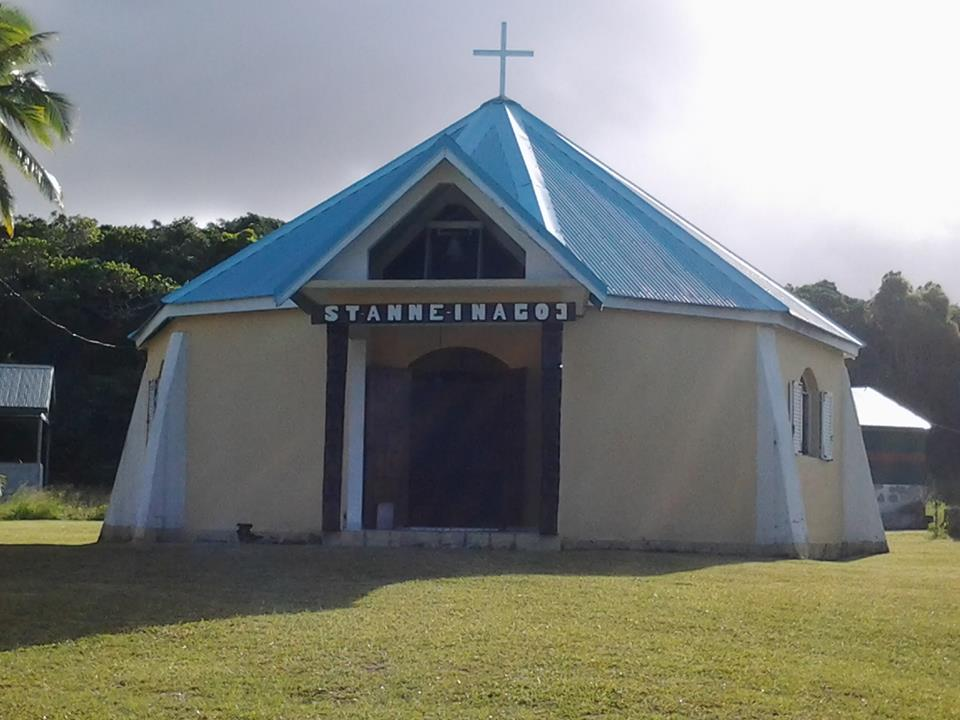
- St. Anne Chapel
- Location: Inagoj
- Country: New Caledonia; France
- Denomination: Roman Catholic Church

The St. Anne Chapel (French: Chapelle Saint-Anne d'Inagoj) or the Church of St. Anne and also written as Inagod Chapel, is a Roman Catholic religious building in the town of Inagod in Lifou in the Loyalty Islands, New Caledonia, a dependent territory of France in Oceania.

== Location ==
The chapel is located in the district of Losi in Inagod. It is accessible by the RM1 and is on the right side of the main island south of the road. It is located 10 meters above the sea.

According to the writings of J. B. P. Fabre, the chapel was built in 1866 and was made with materials like plaster. The construction of this building was made by the tribe for the same reverend and at the same time, a small house was built 5 meters from the chapel, in the southwest side.

== Usage ==
The chapel is mainly used for Catholic worship. A new chapel was built according to an octagonal plan, according to the old designs of Christian architecture.

== See also ==
- Roman Catholicism in France
- Nouméa Cathedral
