= Robert Xowie =

New Caledonian politician

Mayor of Lifou
- Incumbent
- Assumed office March 23, 2014
- Preceded by: Néko Hnepeune

3rd President of Loyalty Islands Province
- In office May 14, 1999 – May 9, 2004
- Preceded by: Nidoïsh Naisseline
- Succeeded by: Néko Hnepeune

Mayor of Lifou
- In office June 23, 1995 – March 11, 2001
- Preceded by: Macate Wenehoua
- Succeeded by: Néko Hnepeune

Personal details
- Born: August 27, 1962 Lifou, New Caledonia
- Party: FLNKS–UC

Robert Xowie (born August 27, 1962 in the Wetr district of Lifou) is a New Caledonian politician and pro-independence advocate. A Kanak of the Siloam tribe, Xowie served as President of Loyalty Islands Province from 1999 until 2004, as well as mayor of Lifou from 1995 until 2001.
