= Mangelia colombi =

Scientific classification
- Kingdom: Animalia
- Phylum: Mollusca
- Class: Gastropoda
- Subclass: Caenogastropoda
- Order: Neogastropoda
- Superfamily: Conoidea
- Family: Mangeliidae
- Genus: Mangelia
- Species: M. colombi

Binomial name
- Mangelia colombi R.P.J. Hervier, 1897

Synonyms
- Mangilia colombi R.P.J. Hervier, 1897

Species of gastropod

Mangelia colombi is a species of sea snail, a marine gastropod mollusk in the family Mangeliidae.

== Description ==
The length of the shell attains 8.8 mm.

The white, elongate fusiform shell contains 7 whorls of which 2½ in the protoconch. These are intermediary convex with linear sutures, discreetly undulant. The shell shows many longitudinal striae and oblique ribs. It shows many ribs, 15-16 in the penultimate whorl and 13-14 on the body whorl. The rather narrow aperture is almost quadrangular. The outer lip is flexuously arcuate and incrassate on the outside and the inside. The round sinus lies deep under the suture. The siphonal canal is very short and wide.

== Distribution ==
This marine species occurs off Lifou, New Caledonia.
