= Néko Hnepeune =

New Caledonian politician (born 1954)

4th President of Loyalty Islands Province
- Incumbent
- Assumed office May 14, 2004
- Preceded by: Robert Xowie

Mayor of Lifou
- In office March 23, 2001 – March 28, 2014
- Preceded by: Robert Xowie
- Succeeded by: Robert Xowie

Personal details
- Born: April 21, 1954 Wé, Lifou, New Caledonia
- Party: FLNKS–UC

Néko Hnepeune (French pronunciation: [neko nepœn]; born April 21, 1954, in Wé) is a New Caledonian politician. A Kanak and advocate for New Caledonian independence, he has served as president of the Loyalty Islands since 2004, and has been mayor of Lifou since 2001.
