= Mouli Island =

Pacific island of New Caledonia

Coordinates: 20°43′25″S 166°25′50″E

Mouli Island (sometimes also spelled Mouly Island; also known as Hwakaiö) is one of the Loyalty Islands, in the archipelago of New Caledonia, an overseas territory of France in the Pacific Ocean. The island is part of the commune (municipality) of Ouvéa, in the Loyalty Islands Province of New Caledonia.

Mouli Island lies in the atoll of Ouvéa, separated from Ouvéa Island by a pass about 200 yards wide. A bridge opened to car traffic spans the pass between the two islands and offers very scenic views of the lagoon.

Mouli Island is 7.5 km (4.7 mi) long and only 1 km (0.62 mi) wide. At the 1996 census there were 364 people living on the island.
