= Epibator insularis =

Scientific classification
- Domain: Eukaryota
- Kingdom: Animalia
- Phylum: Chordata
- Class: Reptilia
- Order: Squamata
- Family: Scincidae
- Genus: Epibator
- Species: E. insularis

Binomial name
- Epibator insularis Sadlier, Debar, Chavis, Bauer, Jourdan, & Jackman, 2019

Species of reptile

Epibator insularis is a species of lizard in the family Scincidae. It is found in New Caledonia.
