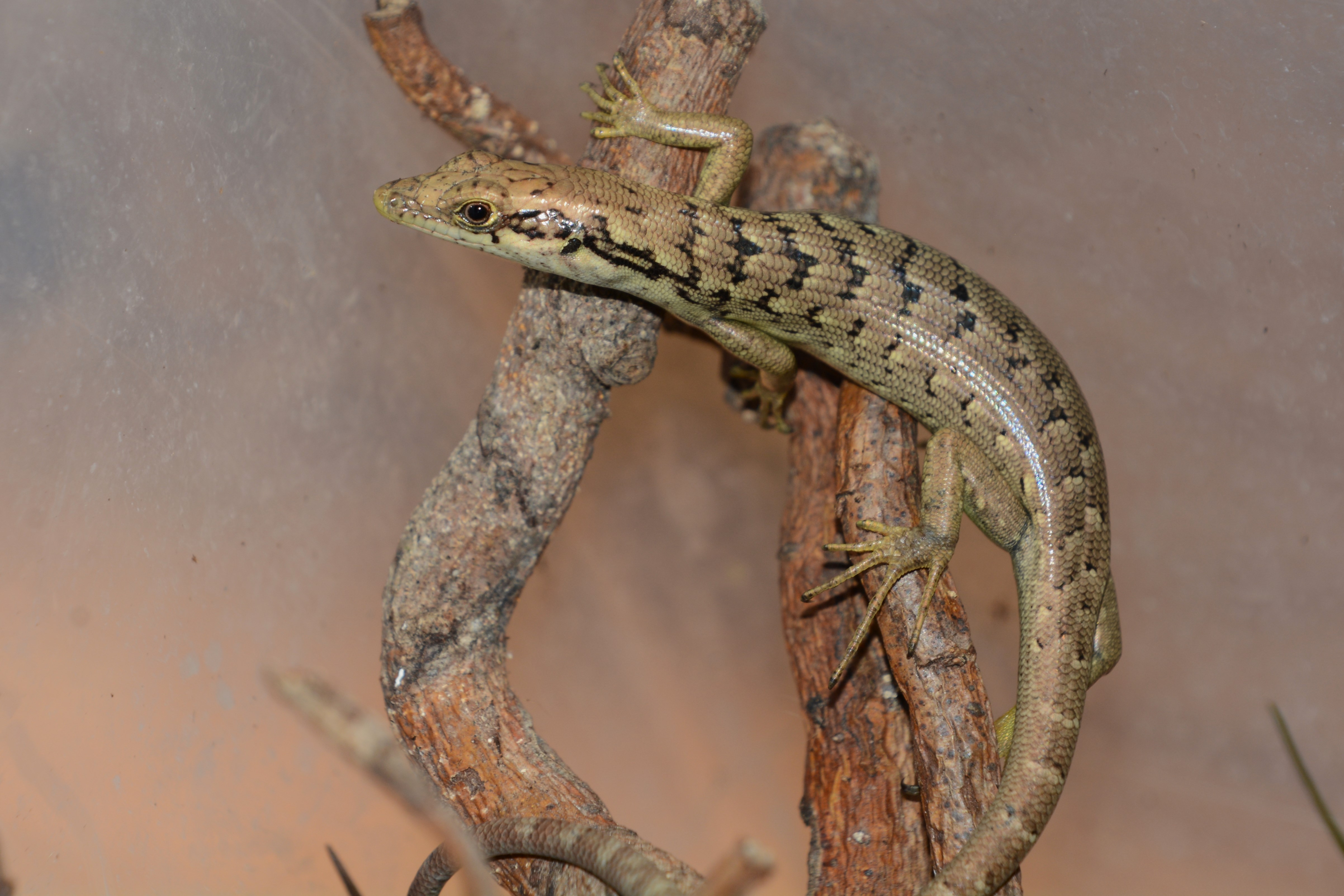
- Epibator nigrofasciolatus

Scientific classification
- Kingdom: Animalia
- Phylum: Chordata
- Class: Reptilia
- Order: Squamata
- Family: Scincidae
- Subfamily: Eugongylinae
- Genus: Epibator; Sadlier, Bauer, Shea, and Smith, 2015

Type species
- Lygosoma (Mocoa) nigrofasciolatum Peters 1869

Species
- 3 sp., see text

= Epibator =

Genus of lizards

Epibator is a genus of skinks endemic to New Caledonia.

== Species ==
The following 3 species, listed alphabetically by specific name, are recognized as being valid:

- Epibator greeri (Böhme, 1979) – Greer's tree skink
- Epibator insularis Sadlier et al., 2019
- Epibator nigrofasciolatus (Peters, 1869) – green-bellied tree skink

Note that a binomial authority in parentheses indicates that the species was originally described in a genus other than Epibator.
