= Epibator greeri =

Conservation status
- Endangered (IUCN 3.1)

Scientific classification
- Kingdom: Animalia
- Phylum: Chordata
- Class: Reptilia
- Order: Squamata
- Family: Scincidae
- Genus: Epibator
- Species: E. greeri

Binomial name
- Epibator greeri (Böhme, 1979)

Synonyms
- Leiolopisma greeri Böhme, 1979; Lioscincus greeri — Bauer & Sadlier, 1993; Epibator greeri — Sadlier et al., 2015

Species of lizard

Epibator greeri, also known commonly as Greer's tree skink, is a species of lizard in the family Scincidae. The species is endemic to New Caledonia.

== Etymology ==
The specific name, greeri, is in honor of Australian herpetologist Allen Eddy Greer.

== Habitat ==
The preferred natural habitat of E. greeri is forest, at altitudes from 150–500 m (490–1,640 ft).

== Reproduction ==
E. greeri is oviparous.
