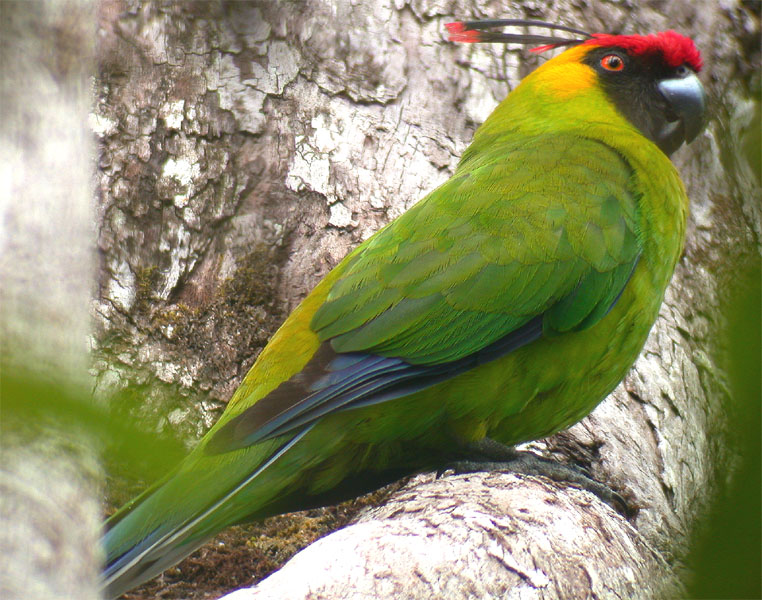

Conservation status
- Vulnerable (IUCN 3.1)
- CITES Appendix I (CITES)

Scientific classification
- Kingdom: Animalia
- Phylum: Chordata
- Class: Aves
- Order: Psittaciformes
- Family: Psittaculidae
- Genus: Eunymphicus
- Species: E. cornutus

Binomial name
- Eunymphicus cornutus (Gmelin, 1788)

= Horned parakeet =

Species of bird

The horned parakeet (Eunymphicus cornutus) is a species of parrot in the genus Eunymphicus, in the family Psittaculidae. It is a medium-sized parrot endemic to New Caledonia. It is called "horned" because it has two black feathers that protrude from the head and have red tips.

== Taxonomy ==
The horned parakeet was formally described in 1788 by the German naturalist Johann Friedrich Gmelin in his revised and expanded edition of Carl Linnaeus's Systema Naturae. He placed it with all the other parrots in the genus Psittacus and coined the binomial name Psittacus cornutus. Gmelin based his description on the "horned parrot" that had been described and illustrated in 1781 by the English ornithologist John Latham in his A General Synopsis of Birds. Latham's specimen had been obtained from New Caledonia during Captain James Cook's first voyage to the south Pacific Ocean. The specimen formed part of the collection of Joseph Banks. The horned parakeet is now placed with the Ouvea parakeet in the genus Eunymphicus that was introduced in 1937 by the American ornithologist James L. Peters. The genus name combines the Ancient Greek eu meaning "true" and the genus name Nymphicus that had been introduce in 1832 by Johann Georg Wagler for the cockatiel. The specific epithet cornutus is Latin meaning "horned".

In 1998, it was found through DNA studies that Eunymphicus cornutus, the horned parakeet, and Eunymphicus uvaeensis, the Ouvea parakeet, were two separate species.

== Description ==
Adult birds usually measure approximately 32 cm (or about 14 inches) in length, including the tail. Like many parrots, the horned parakeet is primarily green in color. This parrot has a yellowish nape with a black and red face and bluish wings and tail. Its most striking feature is a two-feather black crest, with the crest feathers tipped in red.

It makes a nasal "kho-khoot" contact call, and also makes a wide range of shrieks and chuckles.

== Distribution and habitat ==
The horned parakeet is endemic to New Caledonia. It preferentially selects rainforest and laurel forest habitat, but will accept scrublands or savannah. It lives in humid pine forests on New Caledonia, especially when Agathis and Araucaria pines are present.

== Behaviour and ecology ==
Small family groups, or pairs, will forage in the canopy for their diet of nuts and seeds.

=== Breeding ===
Horned parakeets will nest either on or near the ground, and also in hollowed-out logs, or nest hollows in dead trees. Uncommon among parrots, horned parakeets have been reported nest-sharing. The number of eggs laid is usually 2–4. Incubation lasts 21–22 days (in captivity) and the time from hatching to fledging is approximately 5 to 6 weeks (again, in captivity).

== Status ==
This bird has declined since the 1880s, but it is still found in some range on New Caledonia and recent population estimates believe that there are over 5000 birds left. The main threats to the horned parakeet are the black rat, the wildcat, the introduced Rusa deer, logging, La Nina (wet) years, and Psittacine beak and feather disease, a severe virus which is known to affect ~42 species of parrots. Humans poaching the birds for local trade is rare, because the birds' nests are difficult to find, and more importantly, there are no ingrained local customs regarding keeping birds as pets.

The horned parakeet is listed by the IUCN as Vulnerable, due to their restricted range and small, declining population size. These parrots are listed as CITES I as of year 2000, meaning all international commerce regarding the species is prohibited. In 2014, the European Union listed the species as Annex A, which means all intra-EU trade is prohibited. The parrots are also fully protected under New Caledonian law.
