= Rosine Streeter =

Rosine Streeter is a trade unionist from New Caledonia.

== Early life ==
Streeter was born on the island of Lifou.

== Career ==
In 1979, she was appointed General Secretary of Union des Syndicats des Ouvriers et Employés de Nouvelle-Calédonie (USOENC), a trade union for workers and employees. In 1995, after 16 years in the position, she left to start her own trade union (Syndicat Libre Unité Action – SLUA).

Streeter has been a member of the Economic and Social Council of New Caledonia and chaired the Committee on Health and Welfare.
