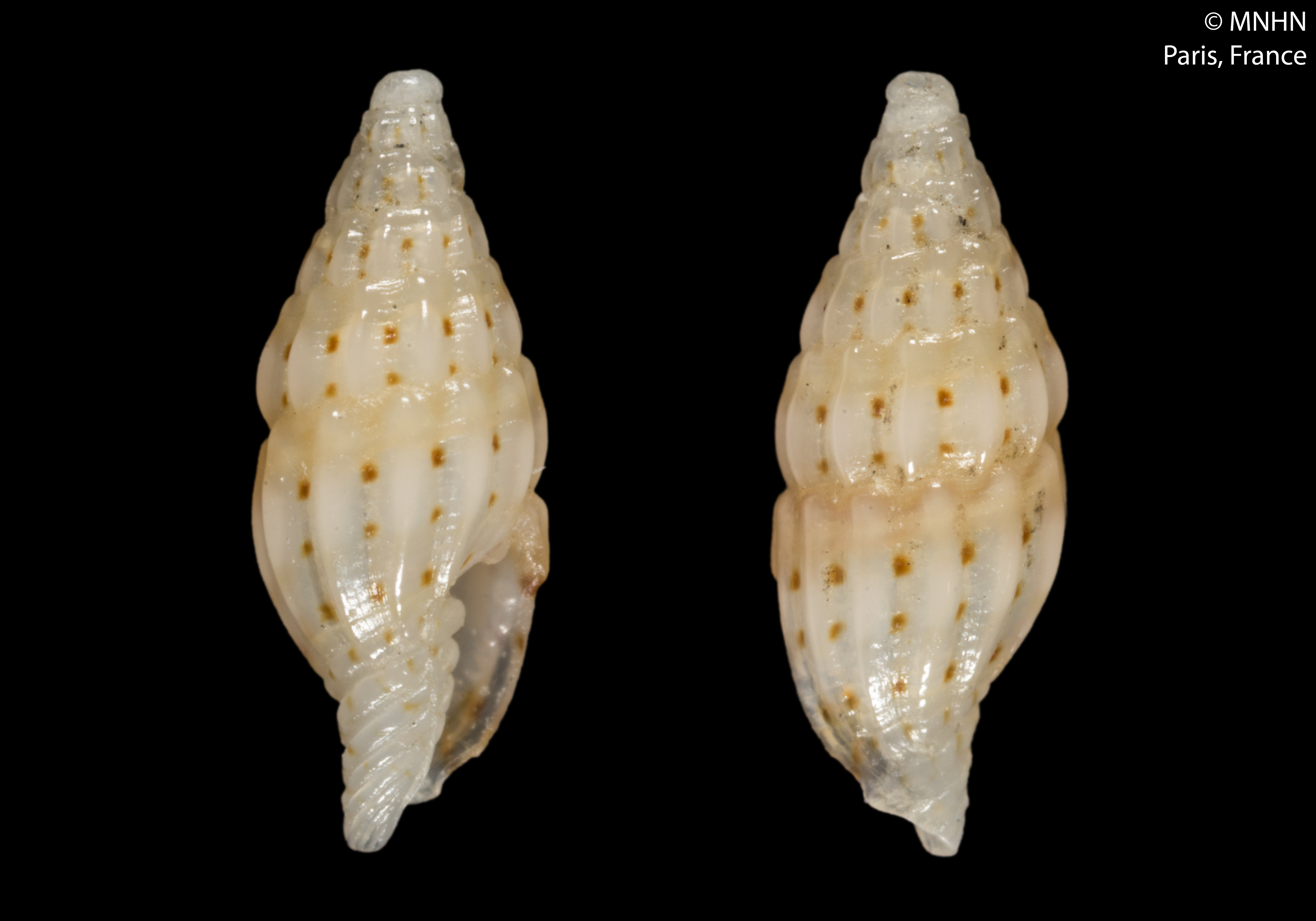
- Shell of Vexillum plurinotatum (lectotype at MNHN, Paris)

Scientific classification
- Kingdom: Animalia
- Phylum: Mollusca
- Class: Gastropoda
- Subclass: Caenogastropoda
- Order: Neogastropoda
- Superfamily: Turbinelloidea
- Family: Costellariidae
- Genus: Vexillum
- Species: V. plurinotatum

Binomial name
- Vexillum plurinotatum (Hervier, 1897)

Synonyms
- Mitra (Pusia) goubini var. plurinotata Hervier, 1897 (basionym); Mitra goubini var. plurinotata Hervier, 1897 (original combination); Vexillum (Pusia) plurinotatum (Hervier, 1897) ·

= Vexillum plurinotatum =

Species of gastropod

Vexillum plurinotatum is a species of small sea snail, marine gastropod mollusk in the family Costellariidae, the ribbed miters.

== Description ==
The shell is small and slender, reaching a length of about 6mm and a diameter of about 2mm.It has the typical elongated, spindle-shaped form seen in many Vexillum species, with a narrow aperture and a pointed spire. The shell surface is ornamental with the fine ribs and markings, giving it a delicate, sculptured appearance. Its overall size and shape make it one of the smaller member of the family Costellariidae.

== Distribution ==
This marine species occurs off Japan, French Polynesia (Society Islands and Tuamotu Islands) and New Caledonia.
