= Ouvéa =

Commune of New Caledonia

- Commune
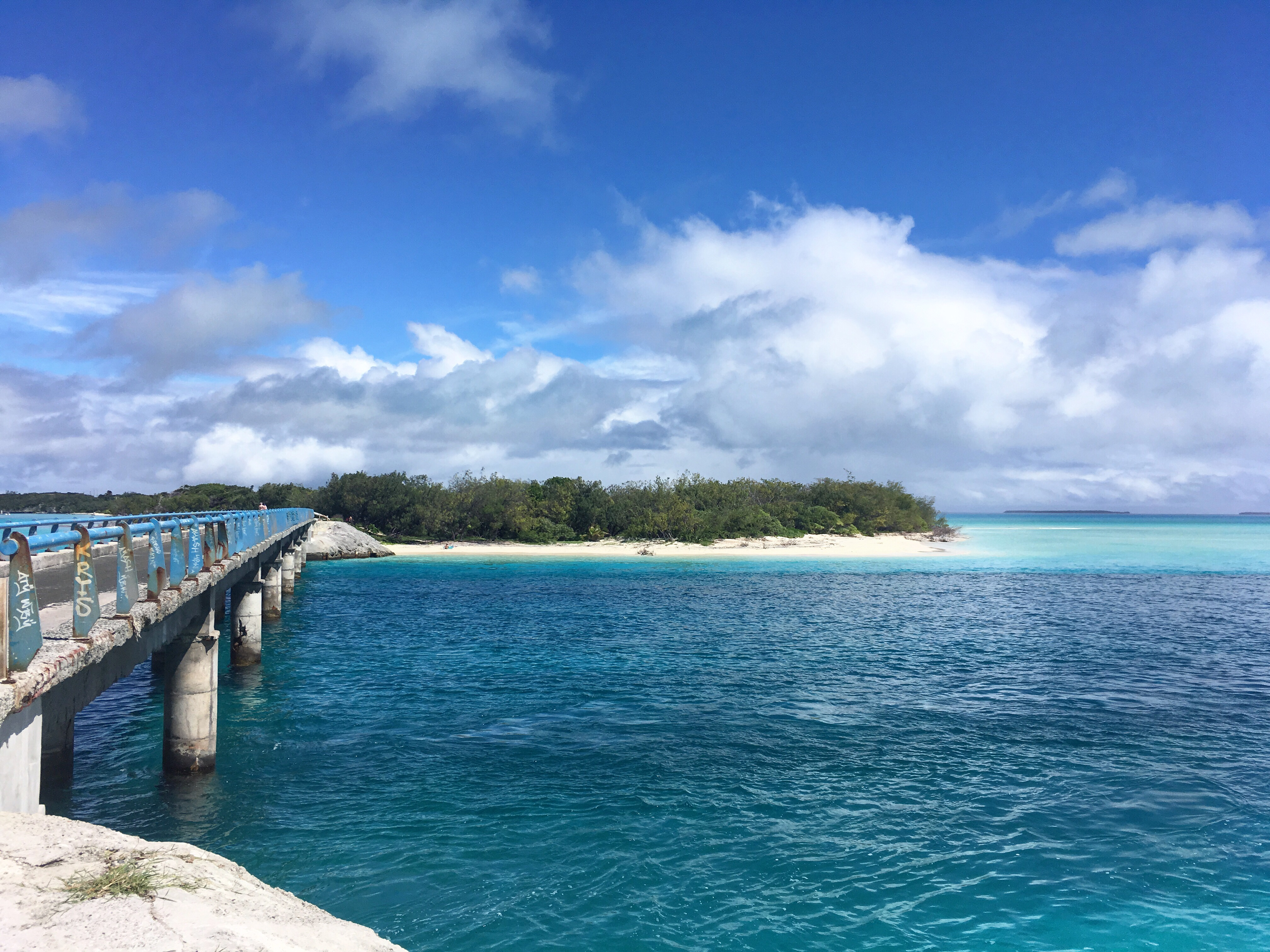
- Mouli Bridge

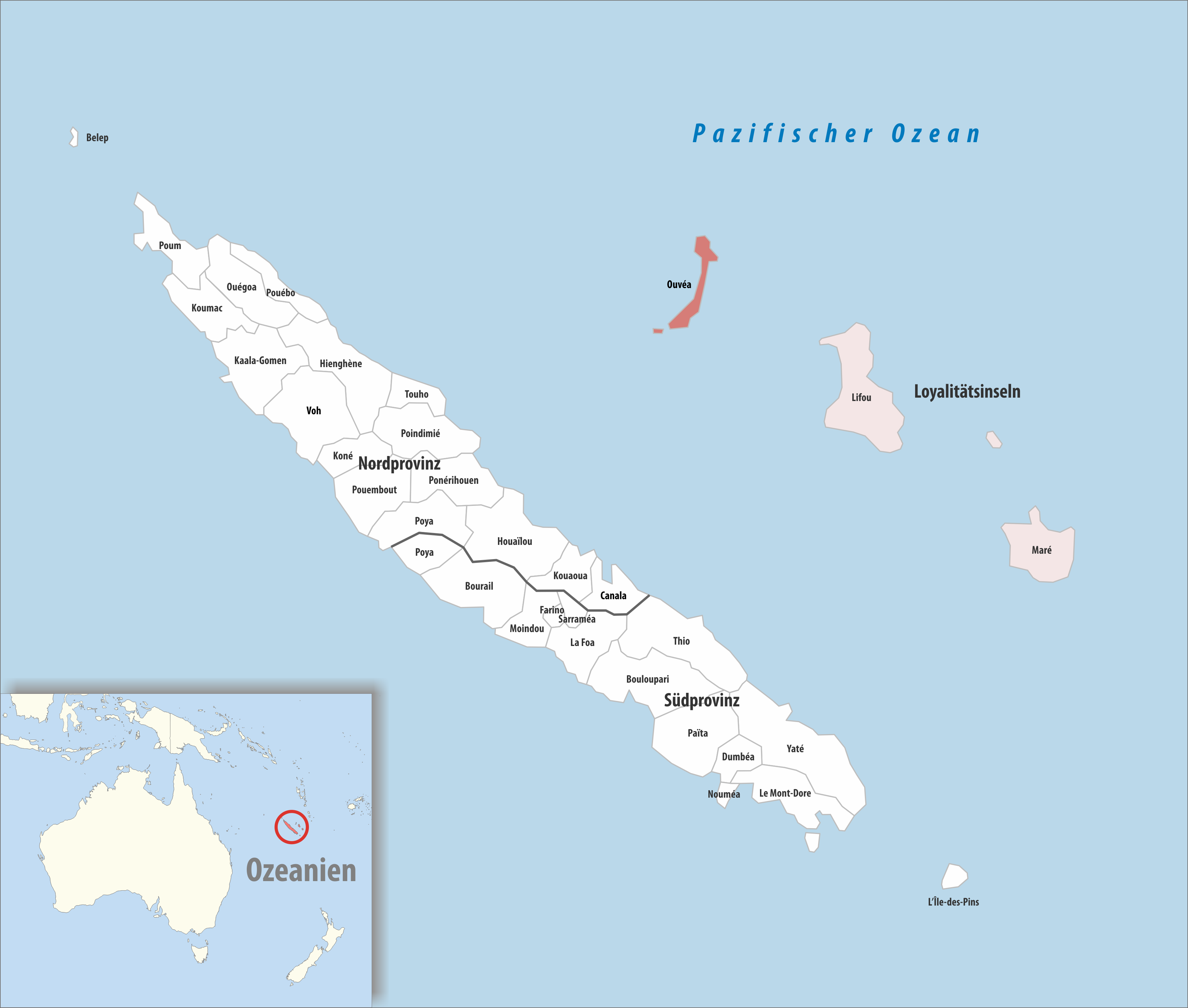
- Location of the commune (in red) within New Caledonia
- Location of Ouvéa
- Coordinates: 20°39′08″S 166°33′43″E
- Country: France
- Sui generis collectivity: New Caledonia
- Province: Loyalty Islands Province

Government
  - Mayor (2020–2026): Maurice Tillewa
- Area^{1}: 132.1 km^{2} (51.0 sq mi)
- Elevation: 2 m (6.6 ft)
- Highest elevation: 46 m (151 ft)
- Lowest elevation: 0 m (0 ft)
- Population (2019 census): 3,401
  - Density: 25.75/km^{2} (66.68/sq mi)

Ethnic distribution
  - 2019 census: Kanaks 90.91% Europeans 0.47% Wallisians and Futunans 0.03% Mixed 3.97% Other 4.62%
- Time zone: UTC+11:00
- INSEE/Postal code: 98820 /98814
- ^{1} New Caledonia Land Register (DITTT) data, which exclude lakes and ponds larger than 1 km² (0.386 sq mi or 247 acres) as well as the estuaries of rivers.

Ouvéa or Uvea (West Uvean: [uˈve.a], Iaai: Iaai, Eaje) is a commune in the Loyalty Islands Province of New Caledonia, an overseas territory of France in the Pacific Ocean. The settlement of Fayaoué [faˈjawe], on Ouvéa Island, is the administrative centre of the commune.

== Geography ==
Ouvéa is made up of Ouvéa Island, the smaller Mouli Island and Faiava Island, and several islets around these three. All lie among the Loyalty Islands, to the northeast of New Caledonia's mainland.

=== Important Bird Area ===
Ouvea has been recognised as an Important Bird Area (IBA) by BirdLife International because it supports populations of red-bellied fruit doves, Ouvea parakeets, grey-eared honeyeaters, New Caledonian friarbirds, cardinal myzomelas, fan-tailed gerygones, long-tailed trillers, streaked fantails, Melanesian flycatchers and striated starlings.

=== Climate ===
Ouvéa has a tropical monsoon climate (Köppen climate classification Am). The average annual temperature in Ouvéa is 24.6 °C (76.3 °F). The average annual rainfall is 1,345.3 mm (52.96 in) with March as the wettest month. The temperatures are highest on average in February, at around 27.4 °C (81.3 °F), and lowest in July, at around 21.6 °C (70.9 °F). The highest temperature ever recorded in Ouvéa was 35.3 °C (95.5 °F) on 7 February 2016; the coldest temperature ever recorded was 6.4 °C (43.5 °F) on 10 August 1981.

Climate data for Ouvéa (Ouloup, 1991–2020 averages, extremes 1971−present)
Month	Jan	Feb	Mar	Apr	May	Jun	Jul	Aug	Sep	Oct	Nov	Dec	Year
Record high °C (°F)	34.0 (93.2)	35.3 (95.5)	33.4 (92.1)	33.2 (91.8)	31.0 (87.8)	29.7 (85.5)	29.1 (84.4)	29.3 (84.7)	31.0 (87.8)	31.3 (88.3)	32.5 (90.5)	33.9 (93.0)	35.3 (95.5)
Mean daily maximum °C (°F)	30.3 (86.5)	30.6 (87.1)	29.9 (85.8)	28.8 (83.8)	27.1 (80.8)	25.8 (78.4)	25.0 (77.0)	25.1 (77.2)	26.2 (79.2)	27.4 (81.3)	28.5 (83.3)	29.7 (85.5)	27.9 (82.2)
Daily mean °C (°F)	27.1 (80.8)	27.4 (81.3)	27.0 (80.6)	26.0 (78.8)	24.1 (75.4)	22.7 (72.9)	21.6 (70.9)	21.6 (70.9)	22.5 (72.5)	23.9 (75.0)	25.1 (77.2)	26.4 (79.5)	24.6 (76.3)
Mean daily minimum °C (°F)	23.9 (75.0)	24.3 (75.7)	24.1 (75.4)	23.1 (73.6)	21.2 (70.2)	19.6 (67.3)	18.1 (64.6)	18.2 (64.8)	18.8 (65.8)	20.3 (68.5)	21.7 (71.1)	23.0 (73.4)	21.4 (70.5)
Record low °C (°F)	15.5 (59.9)	15.7 (60.3)	13.7 (56.7)	12.5 (54.5)	9.7 (49.5)	8.4 (47.1)	7.3 (45.1)	6.4 (43.5)	8.1 (46.6)	8.5 (47.3)	10.2 (50.4)	12.3 (54.1)	6.4 (43.5)
Average precipitation mm (inches)	167.1 (6.58)	164.8 (6.49)	199.6 (7.86)	155.7 (6.13)	111.0 (4.37)	98.6 (3.88)	69.1 (2.72)	85.0 (3.35)	60.0 (2.36)	52.4 (2.06)	76.4 (3.01)	105.6 (4.16)	1,345.3 (52.96)
Average precipitation days (≥ 1.0 mm)	11.1	12.0	13.2	10.3	9.2	7.8	7.1	6.0	4.8	5.7	6.3	8.3	101.6
Source: Météo-France

== History ==
Ouvéa is a Polynesian outlier originally settled by Polynesian navigators who named it for their home island, Uvea Island. Some of their descendants still speak the West Uvean language.

== Kanak activism ==
In April 1988, a hostage taking took place on Ouvéa. Four gendarmes were killed and twenty-seven were held hostage in a cave by supporters of the Kanak and Socialist National Liberation Front. Twelve of the captured gendarmes were released after a while, but six members of a French anti-terrorist squad were also taken hostage. When negotiations to release the hostages did not succeed, French security forces besieged the cave and freed them. Eighteen Kanaks and two gendarmes were left dead. In the aftermath it was alleged that three Kanaks had been executed or left to die after being arrested.

== Languages ==
The native languages of Ouvéa are the Melanesian Iaai and the Polynesian Faga Uvea, which is the only Polynesian language that has taken root in New Caledonia. Speakers of Faga Uvea have fully integrated into the Kanak society and consider themselves Kanak.

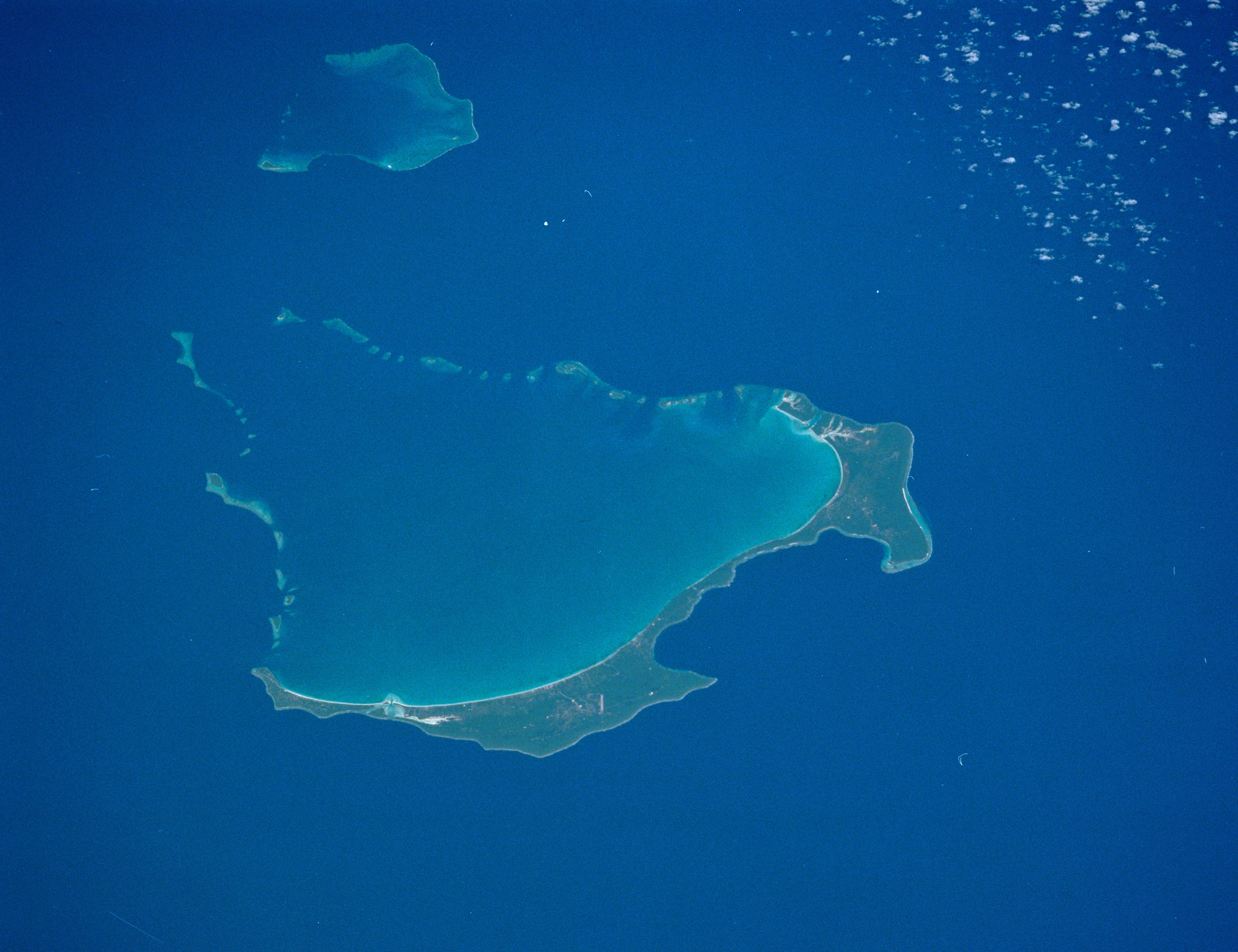
Orbital photo of Ouvéa (islands of Ouvéa, Mouli, Faiava, and surrounding islets), taken from space, November 1990. Courtesy of NASA.
