= Iaai language =

Austronesian language of Ouvéa, New Caledonia

Iaai
- Hwen iaai
- Pronunciation: [jaːi]
- Region: Ouvéa Island, New Caledonia
- Native speakers: 4,100 (2009 census)
- Language family: Austronesian: Malayo-Polynesian; Oceanic; Southern Oceanic; New Caledonian – Loyalties; Loyalty Islands; Iaai
- Writing system: Latin

Language codes
- ISO 639-3: iai
- Glottolog: iaai1238
- Iaai is not endangered according to the classification system of the UNESCO Atlas of the World's Languages in Danger

Bilingual Iaai–French inscriptions at the Protestant church in Fayaoué.

Iaai (Iaai pronunciation: [jaːi], YAH-ee) is a language of Ouvéa Island (New Caledonia). It shares the island of Ouvéa with Fagauvea, a Polynesian outlier language.

Iaai is the sixth-most-spoken language of New Caledonia, with 4,078 speakers as of 2009. It is taught in schools in an effort to preserve it.

The language has been studied by linguists Françoise Ozanne-Rivierre and Anne-Laure Dotte.

== Phonology ==
Iaai is remarkable for its large inventory of unusual phonemes, in particular its consonants, with a rich variety of voiceless nasals and approximants.

=== Vowels ===
Monophthongs of Iaai on a vowel chart, from Maddieson & Anderson (1994:164)

Iaai has ten vowel qualities, all of which may occur long and short. There is little difference in quality depending on length.

	Front		Central	Back	
	Unrounded	Rounded	Central	Unrounded	Rounded
Close	i iː	y yː			u uː
Close mid	e eː	ø øː		ɤ ɤː	o oː
Open mid		[œ] [œː]			ɔ ɔː
Open	æ æː		ä äː		

Iaai constitutes one of the few cases of front rounded vowels attested outside of their geographic stronghold in Eurasia, even if other cases have since been reported in the Oceanic family.

The vowel /ø øː/ is only known to occur in six words. In all of these but /ɲ̊øːk/ "dedicate", it appears between a labial (b, m) and velar (k, ŋ) consonant.

After the non-labiovelarized labial consonants and the vowel /y yː/, the vowel /ɔ ɔː/ is pronounced [œ œː].

The open vowels only contrast in a few environments. /æ æː/ only occurs after the plain labial consonants and the vowel /y yː/, the same environment that produces [œ œː]. /a aː/ does not occur after /ɥ ɥ̊ y yː/, but does occur elsewhere, so that there is a contrast between /æ æː/ and /a aː/ after /b p m m̥ f/.

The vowels /i e ø a o u/ are written with their IPA letters. /y/ is written û, /æ/ is written ë, /ɔ/ is written â, and /ɤ/ is written ö. Long vowels, which are twice as long as short vowels, are written double.

=== Consonants ===
Iaai has an unusual voicing distinction in its sonorants, as well as several coronal series. Unlike most languages of New Caledonia, voiced stops are not prenasalized.

		Labial		Denti- alveolar	Alveolar	Retroflex	Pre-palatal	Velar	Glottal
		plain / palatalized	labiovelarized	Denti- alveolar	Alveolar	Retroflex	Pre-palatal	Velar	Glottal
Plosive	voiceless	p (pʲ)		t̪		ʈ (ʈ͡ʂ)	c (c͡ç)	k	
Plosive	voiced	(b) (bʲ)	bʷ (bˠʷ)	d̪		ɖ (ɖ͡ʐ)	ɟ (ɟ͡ʝ)	ɡ	
Nasal	voiceless	m̥ (m̥ʲ)	m̥ʷ (m̥ˠʷ)	n̪̊		ɳ̊	ɲ̊	ŋ̊	
Nasal	voiced	m (mʲ)	mʷ (mˠʷ)	n̪		ɳ	ɲ	ŋ	
Fricative	voiceless	f		θ	s		ʃ	x	
Fricative	voiced			ð					
Approximant	voiceless	ɥ̊ (ɸʲ)	ʍ		l̥				h
Approximant	voiced	ɥ (βʲ)	w		l				
Flap						ɽ			

Unlike many languages with denti-alveolar stops, Iaai /t̪, d̪/ are released abruptly, and /t̪/ has a very short voice onset time. However, the apical post-alveolar and laminal palatal stops /ʈ, ɖ, c, ɟ/ have substantially fricated releases [ʈᶳ, ɖᶼ, cᶜ̧, ɟᶨ], and may be better described as sounds between proper stops and affricates.

The labial approximants are placed in their respective columns following their phonological behaviour (their effects on following vowels), but there is evidence that all members of these series are either labial-palatal or labial-velar. /ɥ̊, ɥ/ are sometimes pronounced as weak fricatives [ɸʲ, βʲ].

In many cases, words with voiced and voiceless approximants are morphologically related, such as /liʈ/ "night" and /l̥iʈ/ "black". /h/- and vowel-initial words have a similar relationship. The voiceless sonorant often marks object incorporation. However, many roots with voiceless sonorants have no voiced cognate.

The labialized labials are more precisely labio-velarized labials. There is evidence that non-labialized labial consonants such as /m/ are palatalized /pʲ/, /mʲ/, etc., but this is obscured before front vowels. If this turns out to be the situation, it would parallel Micronesian languages which have no plain labials.
