= Ouvéa Island =

Pacific island of New Caledonia

Ouvéa
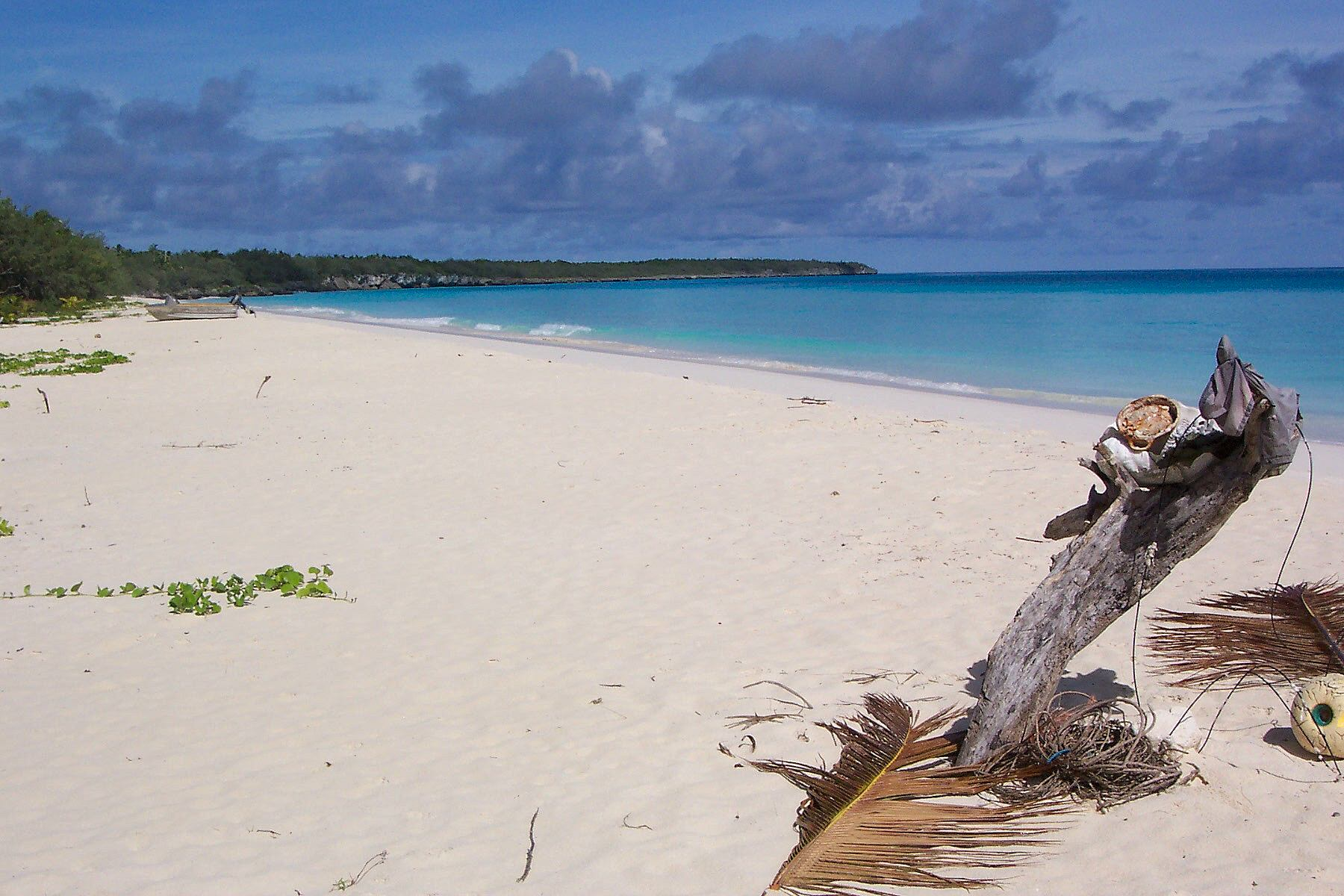
- Mouli Beach on Ouvéa

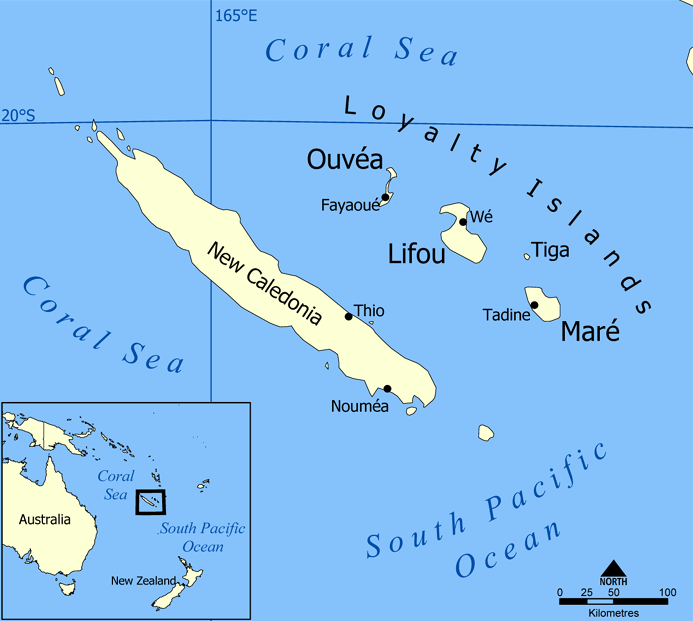

Geography
- Location: Pacific Ocean
- Coordinates: 20°39′8″S 166°33′43″E
- Archipelago: Loyalty Islands

Administration
- France
- Sui generis collectivity: New Caledonia
- Commune: Ouvéa

Ouvéa Island or Uvea Island (West Uvean: Uvea, pronounced [uˈve.a]; Iaai: Iaai) is one of the Loyalty Islands, in the archipelago of New Caledonia, an overseas territory of France in the Pacific Ocean. The island is part of the commune (municipality) of Ouvéa, in the Loyalty Islands Province of New Caledonia.

== Geography ==
The crescent-shaped island, which belongs to a larger atoll, is 50 km (31 mi) long and 7 km (4.3 mi) wide. It lies north east of Grande Terre, New Caledonia's mainland.

== History ==
Ouvéa is a Polynesian outlier originally settled by Polynesian navigators who named it for their home island, Uvea Island. Some of their descendants still speak the West Uvean language.

== Demographics ==
Ouvéa is home to around 3,000 people who are organized into tribes divided into Polynesians and Melanesians by ethnic descent. The Iaai language is spoken on the island.

== Flora and fauna ==
Ouvéa has rich marine resources and is home to many sea turtles, species of fish, coral as well as a native parrot, the Uvea parakeet, that can only be found on the island of Ouvéa.

A large crustacean called the coconut crab or crabe de cocotier can also be found on the islands. The large blue crabs live in palm tree plantations and can grow to several kilos in size. They are a land based species and do not venture into the ocean.

Ouvéa is also home to trophy bonefish that inhabit the nutrient rich "flats" of the atoll.

Conservation International New Caledonia contributed a participatory management plan for the Ouvéa and Beautemps-Beaupré atolls to the Loyalty Islands provincial authorities.
