= Loyalty Islands Province =

Province of New Caledonia

Loyalty Islands Province Province des îles Loyauté
- Flag

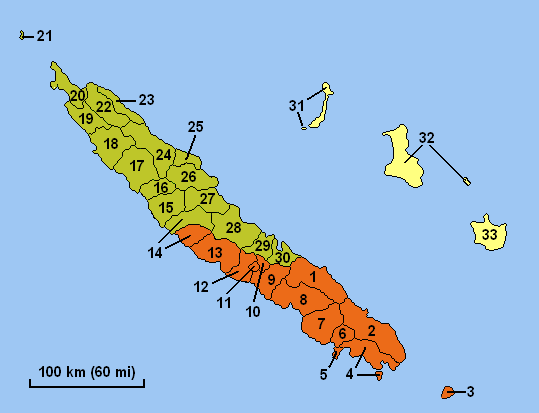
- Location of Loyalty Islands Province in New Caledonia
- Coordinates: 21°04′S 167°21′E
- Country: France
- Collectivity: New Caledonia
- Seat: Wé (Lifou)

Government
  - President: Jacques Lalié

Area
  - Total: 1,980.9 km^{2} (764.8 sq mi)

Population (2019)
  - Total: 18,353
  - Density: 9.2650/km^{2} (23.996/sq mi)

Ethnic Groups (2019)
  - Kanak: 94.63%
  - Multiracial: 2%
  - European: 1.74%
  - Ni-Vanuatu: 0.09%
  - Wallisians and Futunans: 0.08%
  - Indonesians: 0.05%
  - Other Asian: 0.02%
  - Tahitians: 0.01%
  - Vietnamese: 0.01%
  - Other: 1.38%
- Languages: Drehu, Iaai, Nengone
- Website: province-iles.nc

Loyalty Islands Province (French: Province des îles Loyauté, pronounced [pʁɔvɛ̃s dez‿il lwajote]) is one of the three top-level administrative subdivisions of New Caledonia. It encompasses the Loyalty Islands (French: Îles Loyauté) archipelago in the Pacific Ocean, located northeast of the New Caledonian mainland of Grande Terre.

The provincial government seat is at Lifou. The Loyalty Islands are a collectivité territoriale of France. The province's 2019 population was approximately 18,353 inhabitants living on almost 2,000 km^{2} (770 sq mi). The native inhabitants are Melanesians who speak various Kanak languages and Polynesians who speak the Fagauvea language.

== History ==
The first Western contact on record is attributed to British Captain William Raven of the whaler Britannia, who was on his way in 1793 from Norfolk Island to Batavia (now called Jakarta). It is very likely, however, that the discovery and name originated with officials on the London ship Loyalty, which was on a Pacific Ocean trading voyage from 1789 to 1790.

The French Government demanded the removal of missionaries from the London Missionary Society led by Rev. Samuel Macfarlane from the Loyalty Islands and New Caledonia in 1869. This led to the missionaries travelling to the Torres Strait Islands on the vessel Surprise, in an event still celebrated as "The Coming of the Light", on 1 July 1871.

== Geography ==
The archipelago consists of six inhabited islands – Lifou Island, Maré Island, Tiga Island, Ouvéa Island, Mouli Island, and Faiava Island – and several smaller uninhabited islands and islets. Their combined land area is 1,981 km^{2} (765 sq mi). The highest elevation is at 138 m (453 ft) above sea level on Maré Island. The islands are part of the New Caledonia rain forests ecoregion. The chief export of the Loyalty Islands is copra.

An earthquake of moment magnitude 7.7 was reported just after midnight on 11 February 2021 in an area south-east of the islands, with several aftershocks. Over 50 quakes of magnitude greater than 4.5 were recorded in less than 24 hours, and then on the 19 May another quake of the same magnitude happened and caused tsunamis detected by GeoNet's DART (Deep-ocean Assessment and Reporting of Tsunami).

== Demographics ==
The people of the Loyalty Islands are of mixed Melanesian and Polynesian ancestry, with a small European minority. The population numbered 17,436 in the 2009 census, a 7.9% reduction from the 22,080 in the preceding 2004 census. In 2014 the population grew to 18,297, an increase of 4.9%, and in 2019 the population grew a further 0.1% to 18,353.

Several thousand more Loyalty Islanders live on New Caledonia, especially in Nouméa, the capital, and in the mining areas of the main island.

== Communes ==
The Loyalty Islands Province is divided into three communes (municipalities):

- Lifou (comprises Lifou Island, Tiga Island, and several islets)
- Maré (comprises Maré Island and Dudun Island)
- Ouvéa (comprises Ouvéa Island, Mouli Island, Faiava Island, and several additional islands and islets nearby)
- Walpole Island is geographically part of the Loyalty Islands, but administratively part of the commune of Île des Pins, South Province, New Caledonia.

== Provincial congress ==
As of 2018, there are 14 seats in the province's congress held by six parties: the nationalist Caledonian Union holds four, the anti-independence Rally for Caledonia in the Republic holds two, and the National Union for Independence-Kanak and Socialist National Liberation Front, Socialist Kanak Liberation, Renewed Caledonian Union and Union of Pro-Independence Co-operation Committees each have two.

== Presidents of Loyalty Province ==
- 1st Richard Kaloï 1989–1995
- 2nd Nidoïsh Naisseline 14 July 1995 – 9 May 1999
- 3rd Robert Xowie 14 May 1999 – 9 May 2004
- 4th Néko Hnepeune 14 May 2004 – 17 May 2019
- 5th Jacques Lalié 17 May 2019 – present

== See also ==
- d'Entrecasteaux Ridge

== Bibliography ==
- Dunbabin, Thomas: William Raven, RN, and his 'Britannia', 1792–95; in: The Mariner's mirror, Vol. 46, No. 4 (Nov.); London [u.a.] 1960 (S. 297–303)
- Dunmore, John: Who's who in Pacific navigation; Carlton, Vic. 1992
- Henze, Dietmar: Enzyklopädie der Entdecker und Erforscher der Erde, Bd. 4; Graz 2000
- Jones, A. G. E.: Ships employed in the South Seas trade Vol. 1: 1775 - 1861; Canberra 1986 & Vol. 2: 1775 - 1859; Burwood, Vic. [1992]
- Parsons, Vivienne (1967). "Raven, William (1756–1814)". Australian Dictionary of Biography. National Centre of Biography, Australian National University. ISBN 978-0-522-84459-7. ISSN 1833-7538. OCLC 70677943.
- Riesenberg, Saul H.: Six Pacific island discoveries; in: The American Neptune, Vol. 34; Salem, Mass. 1974 (S. 249–57)
- Sharp, Andrew: The discovery of the Pacific Islands; Oxford 1960
- NZ DART Network Data https://www.geonet.org.nz/tsunami/dart
