= Lifou =

- Commune
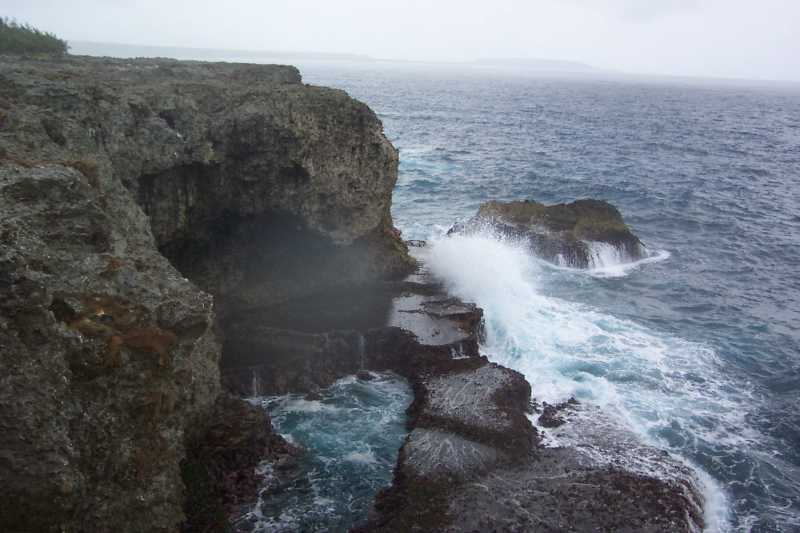
- The cliffs of Xodre in Lifou

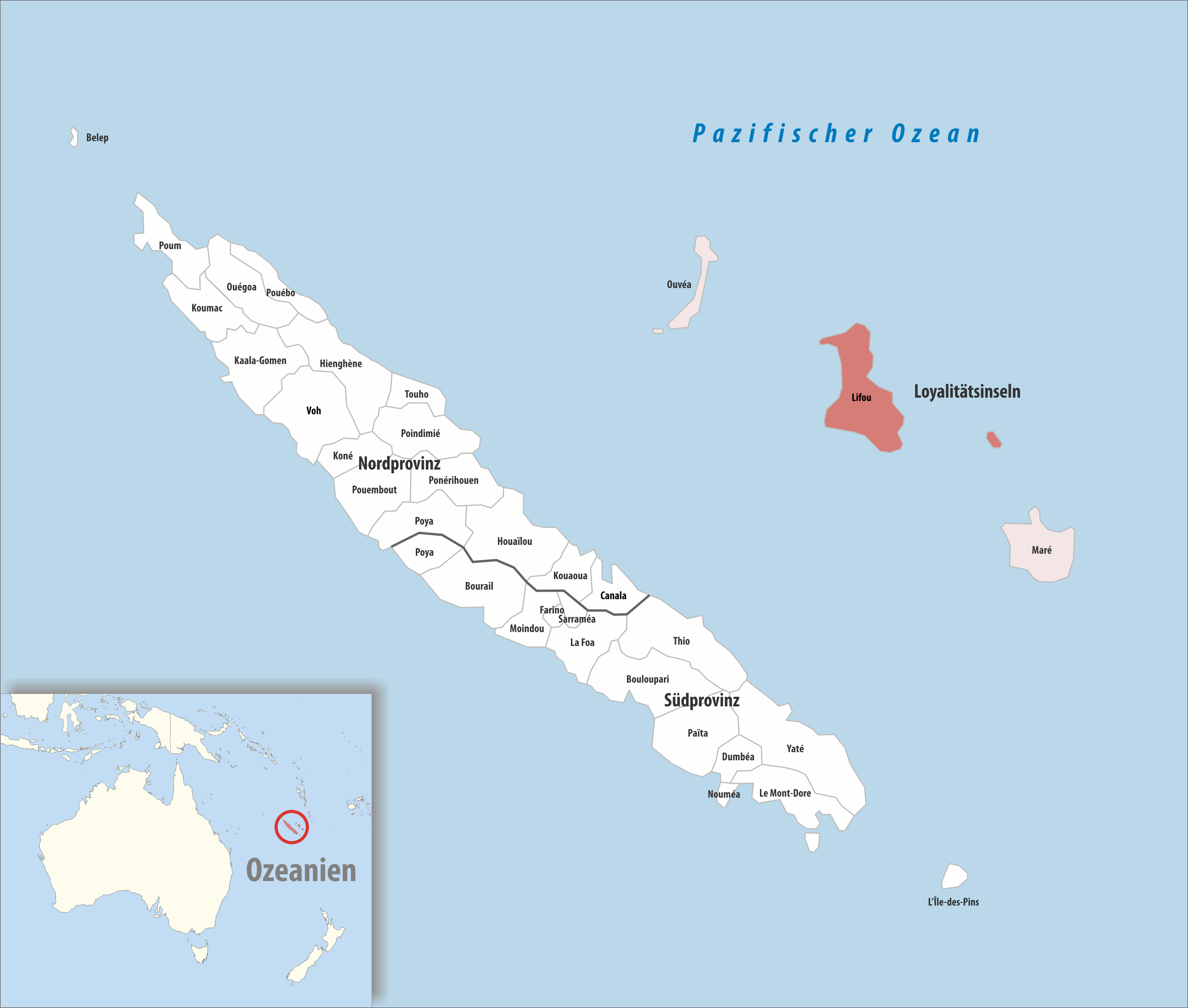
- Location of the commune (in red) within New Caledonia
- Location of Lifou
- Coordinates: 20°58′00″S 167°14′00″E
- Country: France
- Sui generis collectivity: New Caledonia
- Province: Loyalty Islands Province (provincial seat)

Government
  - Mayor (2023–2026): Neko Hnepeune
- Area^{1}: 1,207.1 km^{2} (466.1 sq mi)
- Elevation: 30 m (98 ft)
- Highest elevation: 104 m (341 ft)
- Lowest elevation: 0 m (0 ft)
- Population (2019 census): 9,195
  - Density: 7.617/km^{2} (19.73/sq mi)

Ethnic distribution
  - 2019 census: Kanaks 94.39% Europeans 2.66% Wallisians and Futunans 0.09% Mixed 1.73% Other 1.13%
- Time zone: UTC+11:00
- INSEE/Postal code: 98814 /98820
- ^{1} New Caledonia Land Register (DITTT) data, which exclude lakes and ponds larger than 1 km² (0.386 sq mi or 247 acres) as well as the estuaries of rivers.

Lifou (French pronunciation: [lifu]; Drehu: Drehu, [ɖehu]) is a French commune in the Loyalty Islands Province of New Caledonia, Pacific Ocean.

== Geography ==
Lifou is made up of Lifou Island, the largest and most heavily populated of the Loyalty Islands, its smaller neighbour Tiga Island, and several uninhabited islets in between these two. All these islands lie among the Loyalty Islands, 190 kilometres (105 nautical miles) northeast of New Caledonia's mainland. At 1,146 km^{2} (442 sq mi), Lifou Island is the largest atoll in the world.

The town of Wé, on Lifou Island, is the administrative centre of the commune of Lifou as well as the provincial seat of the Loyalty Islands Province.

=== Climate ===
Lifou has a tropical rainforest climate (Köppen climate classification: Af) that closely borders a tropical monsoon climate (Köppen climate classification: Am). The average annual temperature in Lifou is 23.4 °C (74.1 °F). The average annual rainfall is 1,579.0 mm (62.17 in) with March as the wettest month. The temperatures are highest on average in February, at around 26.6 °C (79.9 °F), and lowest in August, at around 20.1 °C (68.2 °F). The highest temperature ever recorded in Lifou was 34.6 °C (94.3 °F) on 7 February 2016; the coldest temperature ever recorded was 4.4 °C (39.9 °F) on 27 July 1985.

Climate data for Lifou (Ouanaham, 1991−2020 normals, extremes 1960−present)
Month	Jan	Feb	Mar	Apr	May	Jun	Jul	Aug	Sep	Oct	Nov	Dec	Year
Record high °C (°F)	33.3 (91.9)	34.6 (94.3)	32.1 (89.8)	31.9 (89.4)	30.3 (86.5)	29.5 (85.1)	30.0 (86.0)	28.9 (84.0)	30.6 (87.1)	30.3 (86.5)	32.2 (90.0)	32.8 (91.0)	34.6 (94.3)
Mean daily maximum °C (°F)	29.6 (85.3)	30.0 (86.0)	29.3 (84.7)	28.1 (82.6)	26.3 (79.3)	25.0 (77.0)	24.3 (75.7)	24.4 (75.9)	25.4 (77.7)	26.6 (79.9)	27.7 (81.9)	28.9 (84.0)	27.1 (80.8)
Daily mean °C (°F)	26.2 (79.2)	26.6 (79.9)	26.2 (79.2)	24.9 (76.8)	22.7 (72.9)	21.4 (70.5)	20.1 (68.2)	20.0 (68.0)	21.0 (69.8)	22.5 (72.5)	23.9 (75.0)	25.3 (77.5)	23.4 (74.1)
Mean daily minimum °C (°F)	22.8 (73.0)	23.3 (73.9)	23.1 (73.6)	21.7 (71.1)	19.1 (66.4)	17.7 (63.9)	15.9 (60.6)	15.7 (60.3)	16.6 (61.9)	18.5 (65.3)	20.0 (68.0)	21.6 (70.9)	19.7 (67.5)
Record low °C (°F)	11.0 (51.8)	14.1 (57.4)	13.6 (56.5)	10.9 (51.6)	7.4 (45.3)	5.5 (41.9)	4.4 (39.9)	4.5 (40.1)	5.5 (41.9)	7.0 (44.6)	8.5 (47.3)	10.0 (50.0)	4.4 (39.9)
Average precipitation mm (inches)	174.2 (6.86)	194.9 (7.67)	242.4 (9.54)	185.2 (7.29)	144.8 (5.70)	127.8 (5.03)	88.2 (3.47)	70.8 (2.79)	70.4 (2.77)	66.6 (2.62)	75.9 (2.99)	137.8 (5.43)	1,579 (62.17)
Average precipitation days (≥ 1.0 mm)	12.1	13.0	15.4	11.9	11.7	9.5	8.0	6.5	6.2	7.0	7.4	10.1	118.8
Mean monthly sunshine hours	223.4	186.8	194.0	194.6	178.3	151.4	180.0	194.5	208.7	236.1	230.1	233.8	2,411.5
Source 1: Météo-France
Source 2: Service de la météorologie de la Nouvelle-Calédonie

== Geology ==
Like Maré and Ouvéa, the other Loyalty islands, Lifou is made of fossil coral. Lifou is a makatea (raised coral atoll), an ancient lagoon slowly raised by geological processes. Due to the uplift, Lifou consists of a wide, flat centre surrounded by cliffs which correspond to the ancient reefal cliffs. The coral rock exhibits high porosity and hence, neither Lifou nor any of the other Loyalty Islands have surface water. It does, however, have a large freshwater reservoir which can be accessed through caves. These caves were used in the past when searching for fresh water, and are very important to the island's mythology.

== History ==
=== Economic ===
The first Europeans to have contact with Lifouans were whalers, who had very limited, and certainly not friendly, communications with them. Sandalwood traders also came to New Caledonia around 1841.

=== Religious ===
By the mid-19th century, there were Anglican missionaries at work on Lifou, although there had been natives and Polynesian immigrants doing religious work before then. In 1843, French Catholic missionaries arrived on Lifou; shortly afterward, the Anglicans and Catholics became involved in a religious war that lasted until the French takeover of Lifou in 1864. The missionaries even established a school on Lifou Island, and from 1840 to the early 20th century taught most of the population to read. In 1866, St. Anne Chapel was built in Inagoj. In recent years Lifouans have been referred to as "devout Christians."

== Economy ==
=== Tourism ===
Lifou is a popular cruise port, with many cruises coming from Australia. The most common port-of-call is Easo; the ships anchor just off the island and tender passengers ashore, being too large for the wharf there. Lifou is known for its snorkeling.

=== Farming ===
The Lifouans grow several crops, including yams, taro, and bananas; they also produce copra.

== Notable residents ==
- Christian Karembeu, a French footballer who won the 1998 FIFA World Cup with the French National side, is from Lifou.
- Rosine Streeter, trade unionist, was born on Lifou.

== Images of Lifou ==
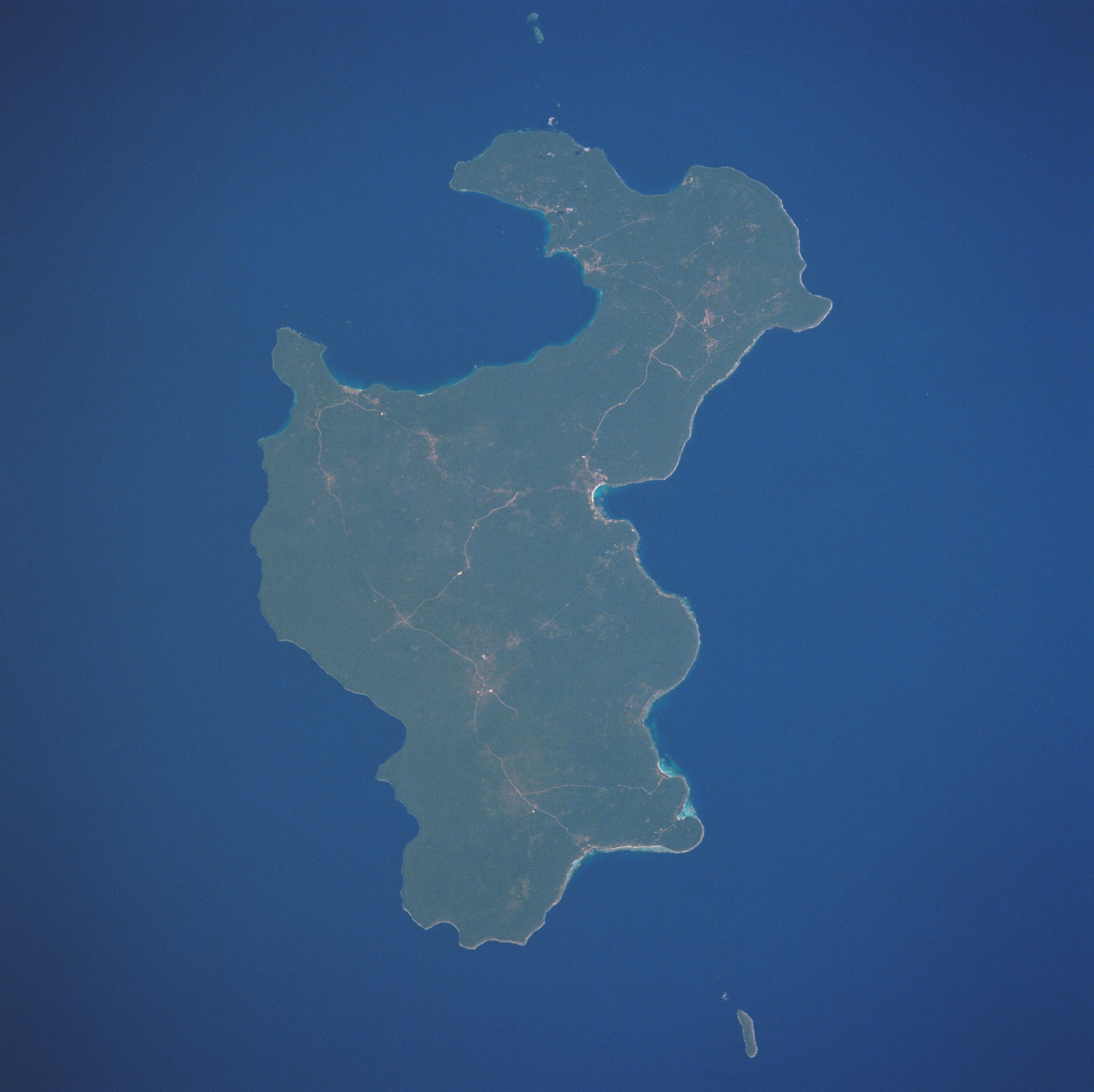
Orbital photo of Lifou Island taken from space, November 1990. Courtesy of NASA.

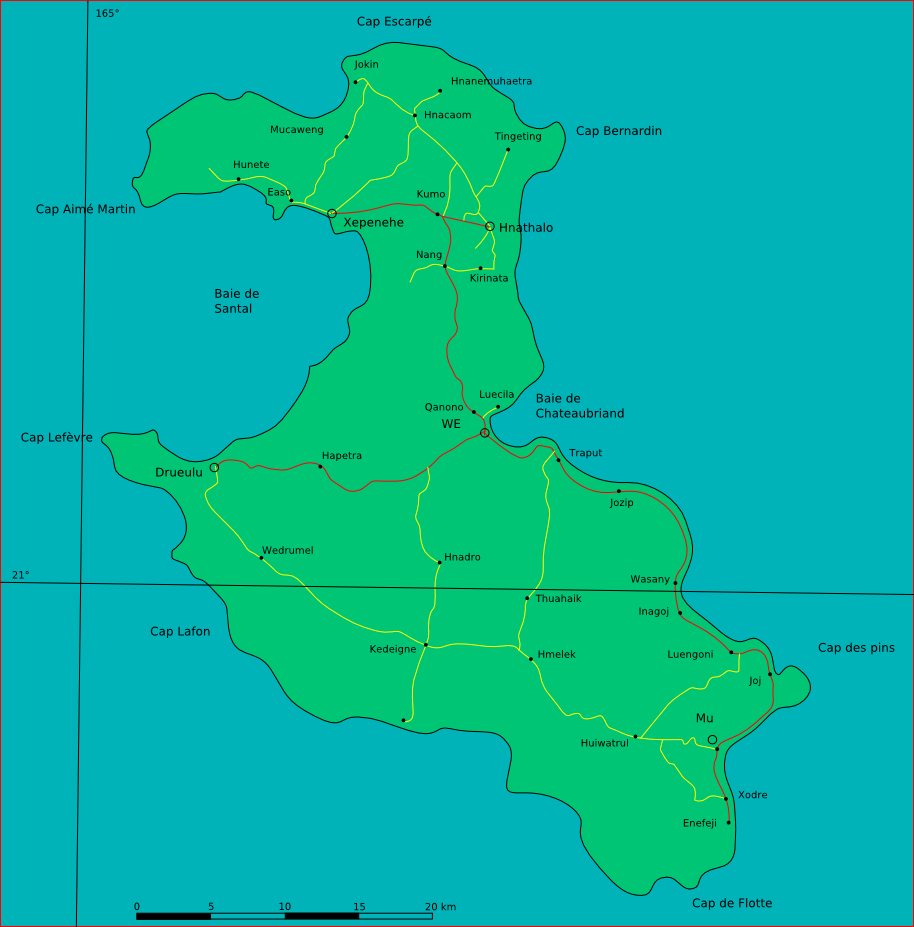
Map of Lifou island

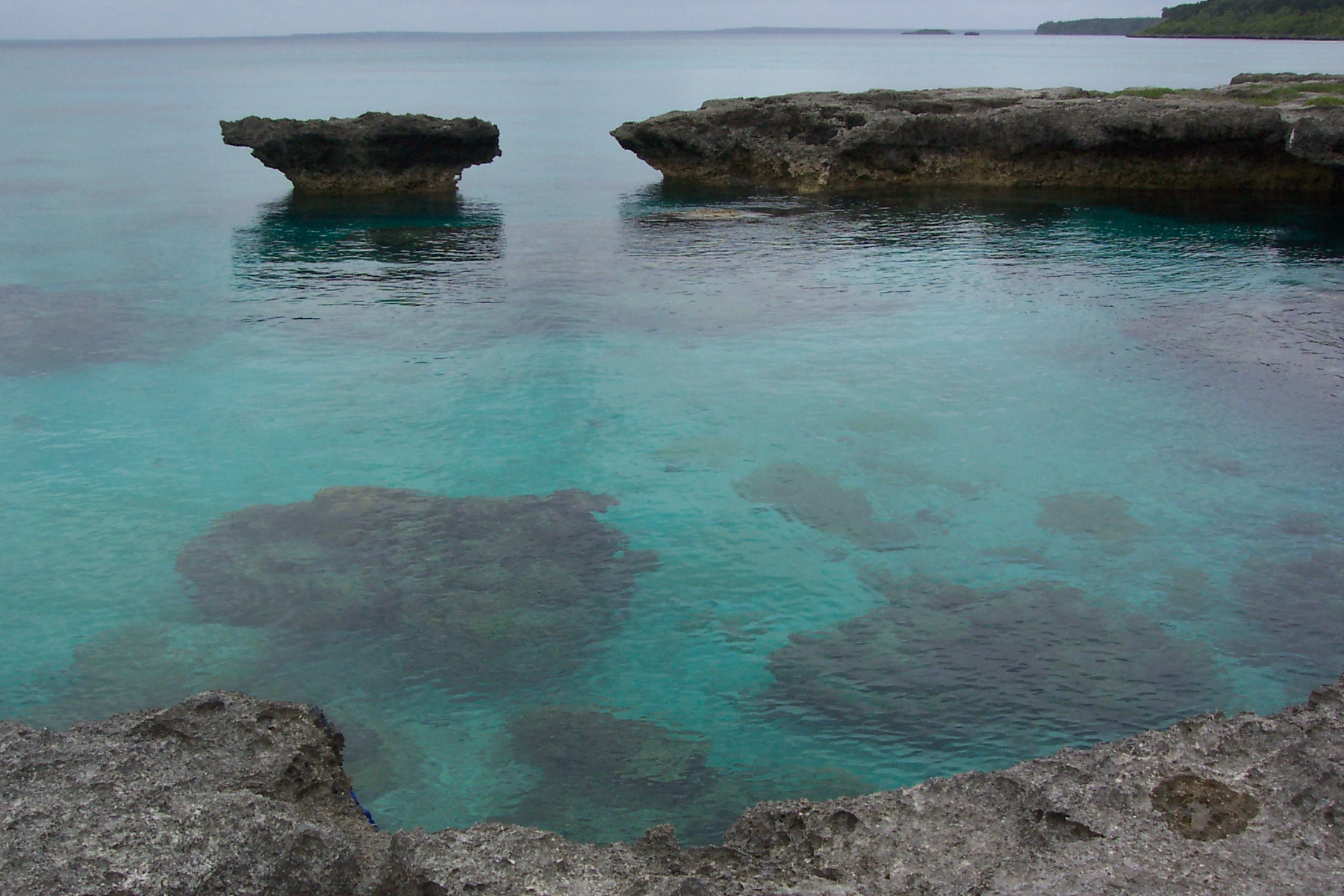
Coral reef off Lifou Island
