= 1979 New Caledonian legislative election =

| ← 1977 | 1 July 1979 | 1984 → |
- All 36 seats in Congress; 18 seats needed for a majority
| Party | Leader | Vote % | Seats | +/– |
|---|---|---|---|---|
| RPC | Jacques Lafleur | 40.24 | 15 | +3 |
| UC | Jean-Marie Tjibaou | 34.43 | 14 | −2 |
| FNSC | Jean-Pierre Aïfa | 17.82 | 7 | New |
This lists parties that won seats. See the complete results below.

Early legislative elections were held in New Caledonia on 1 July 1979 after the Government Council was dismissed by the French government and the High Commissioner dissolved the Assembly elected in 1977.

== Background ==
In March 1979 the Government Council of New Caledonia – controlled by the pro-independence Caledonian Union – was dismissed by the French government after failing to vote in favour of a ten-year plan for the territory. High Commissioner Claude Charbonniaud given executive power.

A 10% electoral threshold was introduced for the elections, which was reported by Pacific Islands Monthly to mainly affect the prospects of indigenous and pro-independence parties. As a result, the pro-independence Caledonian Union, Caledonian Socialist Party, Melanesian Progressive Union, Party of Kanak Liberation and United Front of Kanak Liberation formed the Independence Front.

== Results ==
| Party | Votes | % | Seats | +/– |
|---|---|---|---|---|
| Rally for Caledonia | 20,153 | 40.24 | 15 | +3 |
| Independence Front (UC–PSC–UPM–Palika–FULK) | 17,241 | 34.43 | 14 | –2 |
| Federation for a New Caledonian Society | 8,925 | 17.82 | 7 | New |
| Caledonian Socialist Federation | 1,345 | 2.69 | 0 | New |
| Caledonian and Metropolitan Popular Rally | 1,020 | 2.04 | 0 | New |
| Union of Wallisians and Futunians in Caledonia | 560 | 1.12 | 0 | New |
| Caledonian Democrat Rally | 544 | 1.09 | 0 | New |
| Union for French Democracy | 294 | 0.59 | 0 | New |
| Total | 50,082 | 100.00 | 36 | +1 |
| Valid votes | 50,082 | 99.13 | | |
| Invalid/blank votes | 442 | 0.87 | | |
| Total votes | 50,524 | 100.00 | | |
| Registered voters/turnout | 68,279 | 74.00 | | |
Source: Juridoc

=== Elected members ===
| Constituency | Member | Party | Notes |
|---|---|---|---|
| East (7 seats) | François Burck | Independence Front (UC) | |
| East (7 seats) | Yves de Villelongue | Rally for Caledonia | Re-elected |
| East (7 seats) | André Gopea | Independence Front (UPM) | Re-elected |
| East (7 seats) | Éloi Machoro | Independence Front (UC) | Re-elected |
| East (7 seats) | Auguste Parawi-Reybas | Rally for Caledonia | Re-elected |
| East (7 seats) | Francis Poadouy | Independence Front (PALIKA) | |
| East (7 seats) | Jean-Marie Tjibaou | Independence Front (UC) | Re-elected |
| Islands (5 seats) | Nidoïsh Naisseline | Independence Front (PALIKA) | Re-elected |
| Islands (5 seats) | Dick Ukeiwé | Rally for Caledonia | Re-elected |
| Islands (5 seats) | Yann Céléné Uregeï | Independence Front (FULK) | Re-elected |
| Islands (5 seats) | Édouard Wapaé | Independence Front (UC) | Re-elected |
| Islands (5 seats) | Yeiwéné Yeiwéné | Independence Front (UC) | Re-elected |
| South (17 seats) | Christian Boissery | Federation for a New Caledonian Society | |
| South (17 seats) | Stanley Camerlynck | Federation for a New Caledonian Society | Re-elected (previously UNC in East) |
| South (17 seats) | Lionel Cherrier | Federation for a New Caledonian Society | |
| South (17 seats) | André Caillard | Rally for Caledonia | |
| South (17 seats) | René de Saint-Quentin | Rally for Caledonia | |
| South (17 seats) | Georges Faure | Rally for Caledonia | |
| South (17 seats) | Melito Finau | Federation for a New Caledonian Society | |
| South (17 seats) | Max Frouin | Rally for Caledonia | Re-elected (previously MLC) |
| South (17 seats) | Jacques Lafleur | Rally for Caledonia | |
| South (17 seats) | Jean Lèques | Rally for Caledonia | Re-elected (previously MLC) |
| South (17 seats) | Roger Laroque | Rally for Caledonia | Re-elected |
| South (17 seats) | Petelo Manuofiua | Rally for Caledonia | Re-elected |
| South (17 seats) | Gérald Meyer | Federation for a New Caledonian Society | |
| South (17 seats) | Jacques Mouren | Rally for Caledonia | Re-elected |
| South (17 seats) | Rock Pidjot | Independence Front (UC) | Re-elected |
| South (17 seats) | Marie-Paule Serve | Rally for Caledonia | Re-elected |
| South (17 seats) | Jacques Violette | Independence Front (PSC) | Re-elected |
| West (7 seats) | Jean-Pierre Aïfa | Federation for a New Caledonian Society | Re-elected (previously UNC) |
| West (7 seats) | Jean Delouvrier | Rally for Caledonia | Re-elected |
| West (7 seats) | Justin Guillemard | Rally for Caledonia | |
| West (7 seats) | Gaston Morlet | Federation for a New Caledonian Society | Re-elected (previously UD |
| West (7 seats) | Gabriel Païta | Independence Front (UC) | Re-elected |
| West (7 seats) | Maurice Lenormand | Independence Front (UC) | Re-elected |
| West (7 seats) | Paul Napoarea | Independence Front (UC) | |
Source: Congress
