= 1977 New Caledonian legislative election =

Legislative elections were held in New Caledonia on 11 September 1977. Anti-autonomy parties won 19 of the 35 seats.

== Campaign ==
A total of 495 candidates contested the elections, representing 19 parties. For the first time, parties were allowed party political broadcasts on radio and television, with time allocated on the basis of seats held in the outgoing Assembly and local government. The campaign was described by Pacific Islands Monthly as "exceptionally savage".

== Results ==
Women were elected to the Assembly for the first time, with Marie-Paule Serve and Edwige Antier winning seats. Of the 35 elected members, 22 were new to the Assembly.

Anti-autonomy parties (Rally for Caledonia, the Caledonian Liberal Movement, the New Caledonian Union, the Union for Caledonian Renewal, the All Ethnicity Union and the Democratic Union) won 19 seats; pro-independence parties (the Caledonian Union, the Party of Kanak Liberation and the United Front of Kanak Liberation) won 12 seats, with the remaining four held by pro-autonomy parties (the Caledonian Socialist Party and the Melanesian Progressive Union).

Party	Seats	+/–
Rally for Caledonia	12	New
Caledonian Union	9	–3
Caledonian Socialist Party	3	New
Caledonian Liberal Movement	2	–3
New Caledonian Union	2	New
Party of Kanak Liberation	2	New
All Ethnicities' Agreement	1	New
Democratic Union	1	–3
Melanesian Progressive Union	1	New
Union for Caledonian Renewal	1	New
United Front of Kanak Liberation	1	New
Total	35	0
Source: Leblic

=== Elected members ===
Constituency	Member	Party	Notes
East (7 seats)	Stanley Camerlynck	New Caledonian Union	
East (7 seats)	Yves de Villelongue	Rally for Caledonia	
East (7 seats)	André Gopea	Melanesian Progressive Union	Re-elected (previously UM)
East (7 seats)	Éloi Machoro	Caledonian Union	
East (7 seats)	Auguste Parawi-Reybas	Rally for Caledonia	
East (7 seats)	Daniel Poigoune	Party of Kanak Liberation	
East (7 seats)	Jean-Marie Tjibaou	Caledonian Union	
Islands (5 seats)	Nidoïsh Naisseline	Party of Kanak Liberation	
Islands (5 seats)	Dick Ukeiwé	Rally for Caledonia	Re-elected (previously UD in South)
Islands (5 seats)	Yann Céléné Uregeï	United Front of Kanak Liberation	Re-elected (previously UM)
Islands (5 seats)	Édouard Wapaé	Caledonian Union	
Islands (5 seats)	Yeiwéné Yeiwéné	Caledonian Union	
South (16 seats)	Edwige Antier	Union for the Renewal of New Caledonia	
South (16 seats)	Alain Bernut	Caledonian Socialist Party	Re-elected (previously MPC)
South (16 seats)	Victorin Boewa	Rally for Caledonia	
South (16 seats)	Jacques Bouttin	Rally for Caledonia	
South (16 seats)	Pierre Declercq	Caledonian Union	
South (16 seats)	Pierre Frogier	Rally for Caledonia	
South (16 seats)	Max Frouin	Caledonian Liberal Movement	Re-elected
South (16 seats)	Claude Fournier	Caledonian Socialist Party	Re-elected (previously MPC)
South (16 seats)	Roger Laroque	Rally for Caledonia	Re-elected (previously EDS)
South (16 seats)	Jean Lèques	Caledonian Liberal Movement	Re-elected
South (16 seats)	Petelo Manuofiua	Rally for Caledonia	
South (16 seats)	Jacques Mouren	Rally for Caledonia	
South (16 seats)	Raymond Mura	All Ethnicities' Agreement	
South (16 seats)	Rock Pidjot	Caledonian Union	Re-elected
South (16 seats)	Marie-Paule Serve	Rally for Caledonia	
South (16 seats)	Jacques Violette	Caledonian Socialist Party	
West (7 seats)	Jean-Pierre Aïfa	New Caledonian Union	Re-elected (previously in UC)
West (7 seats)	François Burck	Caledonian Union	
West (7 seats)	Jean Delouvrier	Rally for Caledonia	
West (7 seats)	Maurice Lenormand	Caledonian Union	Re-elected (previously in South)
West (7 seats)	Gaston Morlet	Democratic Union	
West (7 seats)	Gabriel Païta	Caledonian Union	Re-elected
West (7 seats)	Joseph Tidjine	Rally for Caledonia	Re-elected (previously UD)
Source: Congress
