= 1958 New Caledonian legislative election =

Legislative elections were held in New Caledonia on 7 December 1958. The result was a victory for the Caledonian Union, which won 18 of the 30 seats.

== Background ==
The 1957 elections, the first held under universal suffrage, had been won by the left-wing Caledonian Union, which subsequently formed a government led by Maurice Lenormand.

On 18 June 1958 a protest march was led by right-wing opposition CNRS leader Georges Chatenay, who claimed elections held under universal suffrage were unfair and the new government was placing a financial burden on property owners. Over the next three days, armed members of the CNRS set up roadblocks and detained Assembly members. Supporters of Lenormand attempted to hold a demonstration in Nouméa on 21 June, but were banned from doing so by Governor Aimé Grimald.

Lenormand and his cabinet were subsequently dismissed by Grimald, who took on executive powers.

== Electoral system ==
The 30 members of the Territorial Assembly were elected by open list proportional representation, the same electoral system as used in the 1957 elections.

== Results ==
Voter turnout was around 73%, up 10 percentage points on the previous elections.

| Party | Seats | +/– |
|---|---|---|
| Caledonian Union | 18 | 0 |
| Caledonian Rally | 11 | New |
| Republican Union | 1 | New |
| Total | 30 | 0 |
Source: Le Borgne

=== Elected members ===
| Constituency | Member | Party | Notes |
|---|---|---|---|
| East (7 seats) | Antoine Griscelli | Caledonian Union | Re-elected |
| East (7 seats) | Thomas Hagen | Caledonian Rally | Re-elected |
| East (7 seats) | René Leroy | Caledonian Union | Elected |
| East (7 seats) | Kiolet Néa Galet | Caledonian Union | Re-elected |
| East (7 seats) | Émile Wénou Néchero | Caledonian Union | Re-elected |
| East (7 seats) | Toutou Tiapi Pimbé | Caledonian Union | Elected |
| East (7 seats) | Augustin Dalap Touyada | Caledonian Union | Elected |
| Islands (5 seats) | Pierre Issamatro | Caledonian Union | Elected |
| Islands (5 seats) | Paul Katrei | Caledonian Union | Re-elected |
| Islands (5 seats) | Michel Kauma | Caledonian Union | Re-elected |
| Islands (5 seats) | Henri Naisseline | Caledonian Rally | Re-elected |
| Islands (5 seats) | Dick Ukeiwé | Caledonian Union | Re-elected |
| South (10 seats) | Bernard Brou | Caledonian Rally | Re-elected |
| South (10 seats) | Edmond Caillard | Caledonian Rally | Re-elected |
| South (10 seats) | Georges Chatenay | Caledonian Rally | Re-elected |
| South (10 seats) | Henri Lafleur | Caledonian Rally | Re-elected |
| South (10 seats) | Jean Le Borgne | Caledonian Union | Re-elected |
| South (10 seats) | Gabriel Mussot | Republican Union | Re-elected |
| South (10 seats) | Armand Ohlen | Caledonian Union | Re-elected |
| South (10 seats) | Claude Parazols | Caledonian Rally | Elected |
| South (10 seats) | Rock Pidjot | Caledonian Union | Re-elected |
| South (10 seats) | Albert Rapadzi | Caledonian Rally | Re-elected |
| West (8 seats) | Lucien Allard | Caledonian Union | Re-elected |
| West (8 seats) | Marcel Bordes | Caledonian Rally | Re-elected |
| West (8 seats) | Louis Goyetche | Caledonian Rally | Elected |
| West (8 seats) | René Hénin | Caledonian Rally | Re-elected |
| West (8 seats) | Maurice Lenormand | Caledonian Union | Re-elected |
| West (8 seats) | Georges Nagle | Caledonian Union | Elected |
| West (8 seats) | Gabriel Païta | Caledonian Union | Re-elected |
| West (8 seats) | Théophile Wakolo Pouyé | Caledonian Union | Re-elected |
Source: Le Borgne

== Aftermath ==
Following the elections, Lenormand formed an eight-member government, offering two of the portfolios to the opposition.

After Henri Lafleur was elected to the French Senate in 1959, he was replaced by Roger Pêne. When Rock Pidjot and Jean Le Borgne were appointed as ministers, they were replaced by Évenor de Greslan and Gope-Laguise Iekawé. Dick Ukeiwé resigned from the Congress on 30 May 1961 and was replaced by Wandrerine Wainebengo who was next on the party's list.

Following the death of Toutou Tiapi Pimbé on 3 July 1961, he was replaced by Cidopua.
