= 1972 New Caledonian legislative election =

Legislative elections were held in New Caledonia on 10 September 1972. They had originally been scheduled for July, but were postponed by the French government. Anti-autonomist parties won 18 of the 35 seats, with the previously dominant Caledonian Union reduced from the 22 seats it won in 1967 to only 12.

== Background ==
Prior to the elections, the Caledonian Union (UC) held 12 seats in the 35-member Territorial Assembly, the Caledonian Liberal Movement (a breakaway from the UC) seven, the Democratic Union five, the Multi-Racial Union four, the Democratic and Social Agreement four, the Association of French Caledonians and Loyalists one, the Civic Union one and the Caledonian Popular Movement one.

== Campaign ==
Nine parties contested the elections, with eleven lists running in the South constituency covering Nouméa.

== Results ==
Pro-autonomy parties (the Caledonian Union and Multi-Racial Union) won seventeen seats, with anti-autonomist parties (the Democratic and Social Agreement, the Caledonian Liberal Movement, Democratic Union, Caledonian Popular Movement and AICLO) winning eighteen.

| Party | Votes | % | Seats | +/– |
|---|---|---|---|---|
| Caledonian Union | | | 12 | –10 |
| Democratic and Social Agreement | | | 6 | New |
| Caledonian Liberal Movement | | | 5 | New |
| Multi-Racial Union | | | 5 | New |
| Democratic Union | | | 4 | New |
| Caledonian Popular Movement | | | 2 | New |
| Association of French Caledonians and Loyalists | | | 1 | New |
| Civic Union | | | 0 | New |
| Total | | | 35 | 0 |
| Registered voters/turnout | 46,349 | – | | |
Source: Le Borgne, Pacific Islands Monthly

=== Elected members ===
| Constituency | Member | Party | Notes |
|---|---|---|---|
| East (7 seats) | Eugène Awaya | Caledonian Union | |
| East (7 seats) | Jean-Marie Chanene | Caledonian Union | |
| East (7 seats) | Roland Caron | Caledonian Union | Re-elected |
| East (7 seats) | Marcel Dubois | Democratic Union | |
| East (7 seats) | André Gopea | Multi-Racial Union | |
| East (7 seats) | Similien Nahiet | Caledonian Union | Re-elected |
| East (7 seats) | Kiolet Néa Galet | Association of French Caledonians and Loyalists | Re-elected (previously Entente) |
| Islands (5 seats) | Jérôme Banukone | Caledonian Union | |
| Islands (5 seats) | Jean Caba | Caledonian Union | Re-elected |
| Islands (5 seats) | Pierre Issamatro | Multi-Racial Union | |
| Islands (5 seats) | Willy Némia | Multi-Racial Union | |
| Islands (5 seats) | Yann Céléné Uregeï | Multi-Racial Union | Re-elected (previously UC) |
| South (16 seats) | Alain Bernut | Caledonian Popular Movement | Re-elected (previously NC) |
| South (16 seats) | Edmond Caillard | Democratic and Social Agreement | |
| South (16 seats) | Georges Chatenay | Democratic Union | Re-elected (previously Entente) |
| South (16 seats) | Lionel Cherrier | Democratic and Social Agreement | |
| South (16 seats) | Claude Fournier | Caledonian Popular Movement | |
| South (16 seats) | Max Frouin | Caledonian Liberal Movement | Re-elected (previously UC) |
| South (16 seats) | Fredy Gosse | Caledonian Liberal Movement | |
| South (16 seats) | Paul Griscelli | Caledonian Union | Re-elected |
| South (16 seats) | Michel Kauma | Democratic and Social Agreement | |
| South (16 seats) | Jacques Lafleur | Democratic and Social Agreement | Re-elected |
| South (16 seats) | Roger Laroque | Democratic and Social Agreement | |
| South (16 seats) | Maurice Lenormand | Caledonian Union | |
| South (16 seats) | Jean Lèques | Caledonian Liberal Movement | Re-elected (previously UC) |
| South (16 seats) | Claude Parazols | Caledonian Liberal Movement | Re-elected (previously Entente) |
| South (16 seats) | Rock Pidjot | Caledonian Union | Re-elected |
| South (16 seats) | Dick Ukeiwé | Democratic Union | |
| West (7 seats) | Jean-Pierre Aïfa | Caledonian Union | Re-elected (previously in South) |
| West (7 seats) | René Hénin | Democratic Union | Re-elected (previously Entente in South) |
| West (7 seats) | Georges Nagle | Caledonian Liberal Movement | Re-elected (previously UC) |
| West (7 seats) | Paul Napoarea | Caledonian Union | Re-elected |
| West (7 seats) | Edmond Nékiria | Multi-Racial Union | |
| West (7 seats) | Gabriel Païta | Caledonian Union | Re-elected |
| West (7 seats) | Roger Pêne | Democratic and Social Agreement | Re-elected |
Source: Congress

== Aftermath ==
Although anti-autonomist parties won a one-seat majority, by early 1973 autonomist parties held 20 of the 35 seats following the defection of three members, including Fredy Gosse.

Georges Chatenay resigned from the Assembly in March 1974 and was replaced by Joseph Tidjine. Gosse resigned in May 1974 and was replaced by Evenor de Greslan.
