= Éloi Machoro =

New Caledonian politician (1946–1985)

Member of the Territorial Assembly
- In office 1977–1984
- Constituency: East

Personal details
- Born: January 1949 Nakety, New Caledonia
- Died: January 12, 1985 (aged 35–36) Canala, New Caledonia
- Cause of death: Gunshot wounds
- Party: Caledonian Union
- Relations: Caroline Machoro (sister)

Éloi Machoro (January 1949 – 12 January 1985) was a New Caledonian Kanak separatist politician.

== Career ==
Machoro was born in Nakety in January 1949. He held several jobs, including clerk, farm worker, miner and a teacher in a primary school.

After being elected assistant general secretary of the Caledonian Union in 1977, he contested the East constituency in the elections that year and was elected to the Territorial Assembly, and was re-elected in 1979 when the party ran as part of the Independence Front. Following the assassination of Pierre Declercq on 19 September 1981, Machoro became the party's general secretary. He and other separatist militants went to Libya.

The Kanak and Socialist National Liberation Front (FLNKS) was formed in September 1984 as a replacement for the Independence Front, boycotting the elections in November. On 1 December Jean-Marie Tjibaou declared the formation of a provisional government of Kanak Socialist Republic, with Machoro as Minister of Security. As a result, he became the leader of the independents' armed forces. He disarmed the gendarmes of Thio, and gained control over the village without violence. On 11 January 1985 Yves Tual, the son of a European stockbreeder, was killed by independentist militants at La Foa. These events triggered a series of nighttime rebellions.

On 12 January, the gendarmes started an operation to free the house of a European in Canala that the FLNKS had occupied under the leadership of Machoro. The FLNKS occupants eventually fled to a farmhouse near La Foa. The gendarmerie endured multiple rounds of gunfire and eventually launched an assault after several warnings. The order was given to neutralize Éloi Machoro and another Kanak, Marcel Nonnaro. According to the gendarmerie, Machoro was shot in the shoulder; and the gendarmes attempted to keep him alive, but he would succumb to his injuries about thirty minutes later, on the way to the hospital. In a version told by a fellow FLNKS member, Machoro, who did not die directly after being shot, was already gone when the gendarmes took the farm over.
