= 1962 New Caledonian legislative election =

Legislative elections were held in New Caledonia on 15 April 1962. The result was a victory for the Caledonian Union, which retained its majority in the Assembly.

== Background ==
The Assembly elected in 1958 was dissolved by the Governor Laurent Elisée Péchoux on 9 March after the Caledonian Union (which held a majority of seats) refused to approve the High Commissioner's agenda.

== Results ==
The Caledonian Union retained the 18 seats it won in the 1958 elections. The Entente, an alliance of the Union for the New Republic and some Caledonian Union dissidents won nine seats, whilst the Caledonian Rally was reduced to only three seats.

Party	Seats	+/–
Caledonian Union	18	0
Entente	9	New
Caledonian Rally	3	–8
Total	30	0
Source: Leblic

=== Elected members ===
Constituency	Member	Party	Notes
East (7 seats)	Bernard Brou	Entente	Re-elected (previously RC)
East (7 seats)	Michel Devillers	Caledonian Union	Elected
East (7 seats)	Kiolet Néa Galet	Entente	Re-elected (previously UC)
East (7 seats)	Guy Leroy	Caledonian Union	Elected
East (7 seats)	Émile Wénou Néchero	Caledonian Union	Re-elected
East (7 seats)	Théophile Wakolo Pouyé	Caledonian Union	Re-elected
East (7 seats)	Doui Matayo Wetta	Entente	Elected
Islands (5 seats)	Gope-Laguise Iekawé	Caledonian Union	Re-elected
Islands (5 seats)	Paul Katrei	Caledonian Union	Re-elected
Islands (5 seats)	Michel Kauma	Entente	Re-elected (previously UC)
Islands (5 seats)	Henri Naisseline	Entente	Re-elected (previously RC)
Islands (5 seats)	Fleury Trongadjo	Caledonian Union	Elected
South (10 seats)	Georges Chatenay	Entente	Re-elected (previously RC)
South (10 seats)	Luc Chevalier	Caledonian Union	Elected
South (10 seats)	Evenor de Greslan	Caledonian Union	Re-elected
South (10 seats)	Antoine Griscelli	Caledonian Union	Re-elected
South (10 seats)	Thomas Hagen	Entente	Re-elected (previously RC)
South (10 seats)	Henri Lafleur	Caledonian Rally	Re-elected
South (10 seats)	Armand Ohlen	Caledonian Union	Re-elected
South (10 seats)	Kamandji Ouamambare	Caledonian Union	Elected
South (10 seats)	Rock Pidjot	Caledonian Union	Re-elected
South (10 seats)	Albert Rapadzi	Caledonian Rally	Re-elected
West (8 seats)	Lucien Allard	Caledonian Union	Re-elected
West (8 seats)	Gaston Belouma	Caledonian Union	Elected
West (8 seats)	Marcel Bordes	Caledonian Rally	Re-elected
West (8 seats)	René Hénin	Entente	Re-elected (previously RC)
West (8 seats)	Maurice Lenormand	Caledonian Union	Re-elected
West (8 seats)	Edmond Nékiriai	Entente	Elected
West (8 seats)	Georges Nagle	Caledonian Union	Re-elected
West (8 seats)	Gabriel Païta	Caledonian Union	Re-elected
Source: Jean Le Borgne, Congress

== Aftermath ==
The newly elected Assembly met for the first time on 26 April. Antoine Griscelli was elected as president of the legislature.

On 6 June 1962, the results in the South constituency were annulled. A by-election was held on 4 November, in which the Caledonian Union won five seats (Luc Chevalier, Evenor de Greslan, Antoine Griscelli, Armand Ohlen and Rock Pidjot), Caledonian Rally three (Berge, Henri Lafleur and Claude Parazols) and the Entente two (Georges Chatenay and Thomas Hagen). This represented a loss of one seat for the Caledonian Union (Kamandji Ouamambare) and gain of one seat for the Caledonian Rally (Berge and Parazols, replacing Albert Rapadzi).

Gaston Belouma resigned from the Assembly on 26 October and was replaced by Thène Fonguimoin Boahoumé-Arhou, who was next on the party's list. Théophile Wakolo Pouyé resigned on 4 December the same year and was replaced by Austien Dalap Touyada. Maurice Lenormand resigned on 21 March 1964 and was replaced by Henri Teambouéon.

Antoine Griscelli died on 22 November 1966 and Paul Katrei on 10 April 1967. Neither were replaced.
