= 1957 New Caledonian legislative election =

Legislative elections were held in New Caledonia on 6 October 1957. The result was a victory for the Caledonian Union, which won 18 of the 30 seats.

== Electoral system ==
Prior to the elections the 25-seat General Council was replaced by a 30-seat Territorial Assembly. The new body was elected by open list proportional representation.

The elections were held under universal suffrage, with around 33,600 registered voters, of which 18,964 were Kanaks and 13,406 Europeans.

== Campaign ==
A total of 123 candidates contested the 30 seats, representing eight parties. The campaign started on 16 September, and was reported by Pacific Islands Monthly to have been "mild, with hardly an unkind word exchanged".

== Results ==
Of the 30 elected members, 17 were Europeans and 13 Kanaks.

Party	Seats
Caledonian Union	18
National Centre of Social Republicans	7
Lafleur Party	3
Group of Caledonian Peasants	1
Rally of Caledonian Workers	1
Total	30
Source: Pacific Islands Monthly

=== Elected members ===
Constituency	Member	Party
East (7 seats)	Bernard Brou	National Centre of Social Republicans
East (7 seats)	Évenor de Greslan	Caledonian Union
East (7 seats)	Antoine Griscelli	Caledonian Union
East (7 seats)	Kiolet Néa Galet	Caledonian Union
East (7 seats)	Émile Wénou Néchero	Caledonian Union
East (7 seats)	Jonas Hiaboués Pagoubealo	Caledonian Union
East (7 seats)	Doui Matayo Wetta	Caledonian Union
Islands (5 seats)	Paul Katrei	Caledonian Union
Islands (5 seats)	Michel Kauma	Caledonian Union
Islands (5 seats)	Henri Naisseline	National Centre of Social Republicans
Islands (5 seats)	Pascal Sihazé	National Centre of Social Republicans
Islands (5 seats)	Dick Ukeiwé	Caledonian Union
South (10 seats)	Edmond Caillard	National Centre of Social Republicans
South (10 seats)	Georges Chatenay	National Centre of Social Republicans
South (10 seats)	Georges Dubois	Lafleur Party
South (10 seats)	Thomas Hagen	National Centre of Social Republicans
South (10 seats)	Henri Lafleur	Lafleur Party
South (10 seats)	Jean Le Borgne	Caledonian Union
South (10 seats)	Gabriel Mussot	Rally of Caledonian Workers
South (10 seats)	Armand Ohlen	Caledonian Union
South (10 seats)	Rock Pidjot	Caledonian Union
South (10 seats)	Albert Satragne	Lafleur Party
West (8 seats)	Lucien Allard	Caledonian Union
West (8 seats)	Marcel Bordes	Group of Caledonian Peasants
West (8 seats)	Émile Charlet	Caledonian Union
West (8 seats)	Raymond Clavier	Caledonian Union
West (8 seats)	René Hénin	National Centre of Social Republicans
West (8 seats)	Maurice Lenormand	Caledonian Union
West (8 seats)	Gabriel Païta	Caledonian Union
West (8 seats)	Théophile Wakolo Pouyé	Caledonian Union

== Aftermath ==
An eight-member cabinet was elected by the Territorial Assembly in late October. All eight ministers were from the Caledonian Union.
