= Thomas Hagen (politician) =

New Caledonian politician

Member of the Territorial Assembly
- In office 1962–1967
- Constituency: South
- In office 1958–1962
- Constituency: East
- In office 1953–1958
- Constituency: South

Personal details
- Born: 13 December 1919 Nouméa, New Caledonia
- Died: 24 June 1985 (aged 65) Nouméa, New Caledonia

Thomas Albert Hagen (13 December 1919 – 24 June 1985) was a New Caledonian politician. He served in the General Council and Territorial Assembly from 1953 to 1967.

== Biography ==
During World War II, Hagen took the Free French side and was part of the first New Caledonian volunteer contingent to sail to Europe. He served in France, Italy and North Africa, rising to become a lieutenant by the end of the war. After returning to New Caledonia he worked for the company owned by the Johnston part of his family. He later became the Nouméa manager of Pan American Airways, and was promoted to captain in the army reserves.

Hagen was elected to the General Council from the South constituency in the 1953 as part of the Bonneaud group. He was re-elected in 1957 (when the General Council was renamed the Territorial Assembly) as a member of the National Centre of Social Republicans. In the 1958 elections he stood in the East constituency as a candidate of the Caledonian Rally, and was the only member of the party to be elected in the constituency. He returned to the South constituency for the April 1962 elections and was elected as an Entente candidate. Although the results of the South constituency were annulled in June, he was re-elected in the subsequent by-election in November. He remained in office until the 1967 elections.

Hagen died in Nouméa in June 1985.
