= 1946–47 New Caledonian legislative election =

Legislative elections were held in New Caledonia on 22 December 1946 and 5 January 1947 to elect the 19 elected members of the General Council.

The elections saw the left-wing members elected in 1945 largely replaced by members representing business and the mining industry.

The new Council elected Henri Lafleur as the territory's representative to the French Council of the Republic.

== Elected members ==
The 19 elected members were:

- Henri Bonneaud
- Bourgarde
- Bussy
- Cuer
- David
- Duplat
- Féré
- Legrand
- Legras
- Loucheron
- Mary
- Mariotti
- Henri Lafleur
- Pannetier
- Parazols
- de Saint Quentin
- Robert
- Talon
- Varin
