= Ukeiwé =

Ukeiwé is a surname. Notable people with the surname include:

- Bernard Ukeiwé (1953–2008), New Caledonian footballer and politician
- Dick Ukeiwé (1928–2013), New Caledonian politician
