= 1953 New Caledonian legislative election =

Legislative elections were held in New Caledonia on 8 February 1953.

== Background ==
The elections were originally scheduled for March 1952. Following amendments to the territory's electoral law approved in the first reading by the French Parliament in late 1951, the number of members of the General Council was increased to 25, 16 of which were to be elected by Europeans and nine by Kanaks. At the time, the voter roll included around 10,000 European voters and around 8,000 Kanak voters who met educational requirements to register to vote. However, on the second reading of the bill, the proposed amendments were rejected by 356–256 in the National Assembly following a campaign by the territory's MP Maurice Lenormand, who demanded a common electoral roll. The bill was referred to a committee, but due to a government crisis, dealing with the issue was repeatedly postponed.

The term of the sitting Council had expired on 19 January 1952, leaving no elected replacement. The Chairman of the outgoing General Council Henri Bonneaud flew to France to request its term be extended, which was approved by a vote of 325–198 in the National Assembly. However, when it emerged that around 100 of the votes in favour had come from Communist Party MPs, all-but-one of the members of the General Council refused to continue sitting and handed in their resignation to the Governor on 19 May.

== Electoral system ==
A decree in 1952 created a single electoral roll and divided the territory into five constituencies. Seats were elected by panachage and preferential voting.

By the time of the election, the voter roll consisted of 10,511 Europeans and 9,832 Kanaks.

== Results ==
Fifteen of the 25 seats were won by left-wing candidates led by Lenormand (including nine Kanaks) that became the Caledonian Union, eight by right-wing candidates from a bloc led by Bonneaud, and two by other candidates. Three pro-Charles de Gaulle candidates were all defeated.

Party	Seats
Lenormand group and independents	15
Bonneaud group	8
Independents	2
Total	25
Source: Le Borgne, HG/NC

=== Elected members ===
Constituency	Elected members	Faction
East District and Île-des-Pins	Mathieu Aripoindi	Lenormand group
East District and Île-des-Pins	Kowi Bouillant	Lenormand group
East District and Île-des-Pins	Doui Matayo Wetta	Lenormand group
East District and Île-des-Pins	Rock Pidjot	Lenormand group
East Coast	E. Deruelle	Independent
East Coast	F. Legras	Bonneaud group
Loyalty Islands	Luther Enoka	Lenormand group
Loyalty Islands	James Haeweng	Lenormand group
Loyalty Islands	Michel Kauma	Lenormand group
South	Maurice Bichon	Bonneaud group
South	Henri Bonneaud	Bonneaud group
South	Chalier	Bonneaud group
South	James Louis Daly	Independent
South	Thomas Hagen	Bonneaud group
South	C. Parazols	Bonneaud group
South	Stephane de Saint-Quentin	Bonneaud group
South	Elie Solier	Bonneaud group
South	Marc Tivollier	Lenormand-aligned independent
West Coast	Pierre Bergès	Lenormand group
West Coast	Raphael Bouanaoué	Lenormand group
West Coast	André Caron	Lenormand group
West Coast	Louis Eschembrenner	Lenormand group
West Coast	Maurice Lenormand	Lenormand group
West Coast	Georges Newland	Lenormand group
West Coast	Élia Thidjine	Lenormand group
Source: Le Borgne, HG/NC

== Aftermath ==
A by-election was held on 12 September 1954 after Maurice Bichon gave up his seat in the South constituency following his appointment as Paymaster General of Conakry. The election was won by the Lenormand group candidate Armand Ohlen, who defeated Roger Rolland of the Bonneaud group by 1,568 votes to 1,286.
