= Roger Laroque =

New Caledonian politician (1910–1985)

Member of the Territorial Assembly
- In office 1972–1984
- Constituency: South

Mayor of Nouméa
- In office 1953–1985
- Preceded by: Henri Sautot
- Succeeded by: Jean Lèques

Personal details
- Born: 5 October 1910; Nouméa, New Caledonia
- Died: 17 November 1985 (aged 75); Nouméa, New Caledonia

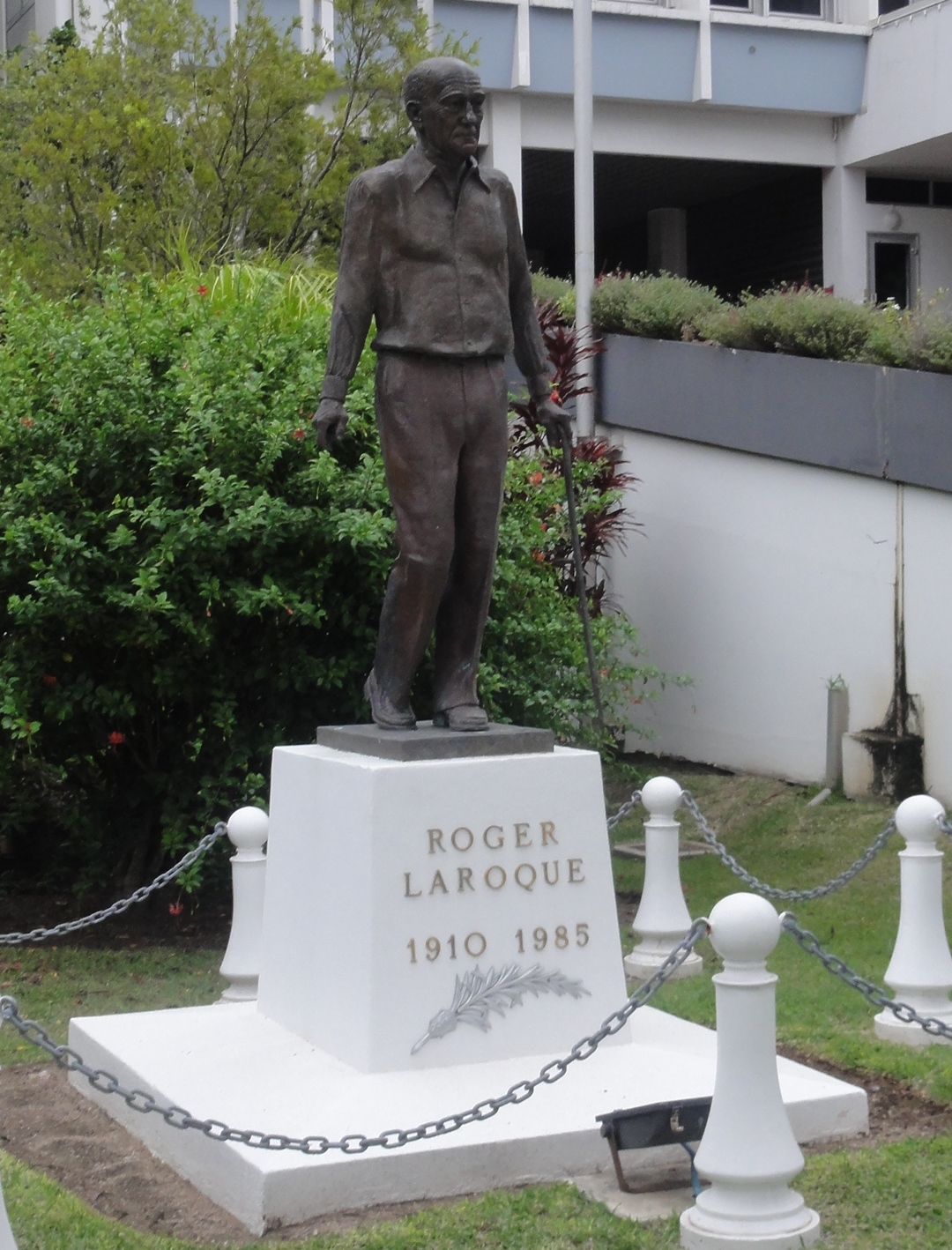
Statue of Laroque outside Nouméa City Hall

Roger Laroque (5 October 1910 – 17 November 1985) was a New Caledonian businessman and politician. He served as mayor of Nouméa from 1953 to 1985 and as a member of the Territorial Assembly from 1972 to 1984.

== Biography ==
Laroque was born in Nouméa in 1910, the son of Gabriel Laroque, a businessman and member of the New Caledonian General Council. He attended La Pérouse College and studied law in Bordeaux. He subsequently worked at Crédit Lyonnais in Bordeaux and then at Société Ballande, returning to New Caledonia in 1937. He joined the French Army during World War II and served in France from 1944, returning to New Caledonia in 1947 and rejoining Établissements Ballande, becoming director then director general in 1956. He also became chief executive of Chalandage, president of Forges et Chantiers de l'Océanie and a member of the board of directors of the Port Authority.

Laroque entered politics in 1947 when he was elected to Nouméa City Council on the list of mayor Henri Sautot. He became Sautot's first assistant and succeeded him as mayor following the 1953 elections. He remained mayor of the city until his death over thirty years later. A staunch opponent of independence, in 1968 he contested the New Caledonia constituency in the French National Assembly elections, losing to Rock Pidjot of the Caledonian Union.

In 1972 he was elected to the Territorial Assembly from the South constituency as leader of the Democratic and Social Agreement (EDS). When the EDS merged into the new Rally for Caledonia in 1977, he became president of the new party. He was re-elected to the Territorial Assembly later that year, and again in 1979.

Awarded the Legion of Honour, he died of a heart attack in Nouméa in November 1985 at the age of 75. He was given a state funeral, and a statue of him was erected outside Nouméa City Hall the following year.
