= 1985 New Caledonian legislative election =

← 1984	29 September 1985	1988 →
- All 46 seats in the Congress; 24 seats needed for a majority
Party	Leader	Vote %	Seats	+/–
RPCR	Jacques Lafleur	52.00	25	−9
FLNKS	Jean-Marie Tjibaou	28.76	16	New
National Front	Jean-Marie Le Pen (Note: Leader of the party in France)	7.37	3	+2
LKS		6.43	1	−5
RPC		1.48	1	New
This lists parties that won seats. See the complete results below.

Early legislative elections were held in New Caledonia on 29 September 1985. They were called after the 1984 elections had been boycotted by the pro-independence Kanak and Socialist National Liberation Front (FLNKS) and were marred by violence that continued for several weeks after election day.

Following an agreement reached between the French government and pro- and anti-independence groups, New Caledonia was split into four regions, each with its own Assembly, with the members of the four assemblies uniting to form the territorial Congress, which replaced the Territorial Assembly.

The FLNKS won a majority in three of the four regional assemblies, with the Caldoche-backed Rally for Caledonia in the Republic (RPCR) won a large majority in the Nouméa region. However, with the South region having by far the largest population, the RCPR received 61% of the total vote across the territory and won 26 of the 46 seats in Congress, with the FLNKS winning 16.

== Campaign ==
Several French prominent politicians visited the territory during the election campaign to support the RPCR, including Jacques Chirac and Francois Leotard of the Rally for the Republic, Jean-Marie Le Pen of the National Front and Gaston Flosse, president of French Polynesia.

== Conduct ==
Although election day was violence-free, a bomb was detonated at the Land Office and Office for the Development of the Interior and the Islands in Nouméa on the day before.

== Results ==
Party	Votes	%	Seats	+/–
Rally for Caledonia in the Republic	37,148	52.00	25	–9
Kanak and Socialist National Liberation Front	20,545	28.76	16	New
National Front	5,263	7.37	3	+2
Kanak Socialist Liberation	4,594	6.43	1	–5
Political Organisation of the Alliances of Opao	2,317	3.24	0	New
Peace and Custom Rally	1,058	1.48	1	New
New Caledonia	516	0.72	0	New
Total	71,441	100.00	46	+4
Valid votes	71,441	98.56		
Invalid/blank votes	1,042	1.44		
Total votes	72,483	100.00		
Registered voters/turnout	89,906	80.62		
Source: Clark

=== By region ===
Party	Centre			Loyalty Islands			North			Nouméa/South		
Party	Votes	%	Seats	Votes	%	Seats	Votes	%	Seats	Votes	%	Seats
Rally for Caledonia in the Republic	5,003	41.86	4	2,640	28.04	2	2,890	23.33	2	26,615	70.62	17
Kanak and Socialist National Liberation Front	5,434	45.47	5	4,908	52.13	4	7,383	59.61	6	2,820	7.48	1
National Front	–	–	–	–	–	–	–	–	–	5,263	13.96	3
Kanak Socialist Liberation	788	6.59	0	1,867	19.83	1	709	5.72	0	1,230	3.26	0
Political Organisation of the Alliances of Opao	726	6.07	0	–	–	–	346	2.79	0	1,245	3.30	0
Peace and Custom Rally	–	–	–	–	–	–	1,058	8.54	1	–	–	–
New Caledonia	–	–	–	–	–	–	–	–	–	516	1.37	0
Invalid/blank votes	110	–	–	570	–	–	76	–	–	286	–	–
Total	12,061	100	9	9,985	100	7	12,462	100	9	37,975	100	21
Registered voters/turnout	14,260	84.58	–	11,806	84.58	–	15,157	82.22	–	48,683	78.00	–
Source: Clark

== Aftermath ==
The regional assemblies convened on 6 October to elect their presidents; Léopold Jorédié (FLNKS) was elected in the Central region, Yeiwéné Yeiwéné (FLNKS) in the Loyalty Islands, Jean-Marie Tjibaou (FLNKS) in North region and Jean Lèques (RPCR) in the South region. Two days later Dick Ukeiwé was elected President of the Congress, defeating Tjibaou by 29 votes to 13.
