= List of senators of New Caledonia =

Location of New Caledonia in France

Following is a list of senators of New Caledonia, people who have represented the territory of New Caledonia in the Senate of France.

== Fifth Republic ==
Senators for New Caledonia under the French Fifth Republic were/are:

In office	Name	Group	Notes
From 2017	Gérard Poadja	Union calédonienne	in office
From 2011	Pierre Frogier	Les Républicains	in office
2011–2017	Hilarion Vendégou	Les Républicains	
1992–2011	Simon Loueckhote	Union pour un Mouvement Populaire	
1983–1992	Dick Ukeiwé	Rassemblement pour la République	
1974–1983	Lionel Cherrier	Union des Républicains et des Indépendants	Replaced Henri Lafleur
1959–1974	Henri Lafleur	Union des Républicains et des Indépendants	Died in office, replaced by Lionel Cherrier

== Fourth Republic ==
Senators for New Caledonia under the French Fourth Republic were:

In office	Name	Group
1955–1959	Armand Ohlen	Indépendants d'Outre-Mer (IOM)
1947–1955	Henri Lafleur	Groupe des Républicains Indépendants (RI)

== Sources ==
- Liste des anciens sénateurs de la IVème République par circonscription (in French), Sénat de France
- Liste des anciens sénateurs de la Vème République par circonscription (in French), Sénat de France
- Liste par département – New Caledonia (in French), Sénat de France
