= Charles Pidjot =

New Caledonian politician (1962–2012)

Charles 'Charly' Pidjot (17 July 1962 – 11 September 2012) was a pro-independence politician from New Caledonia who was a member of the Kanak people. He was born in the community of Conceptions in Le Mont-Dore (New Caledonia) and was the president of the Caledonian Union from 8 November 2007 to his death.

== Political heritage ==
Pidjot was born into a veritable political dynasty as a relative of Rock Pidjot, who was an early elected representative of New Caledonia from 1964 to 1986. From 1956 to 1985 he was the first president of Caledonian Union. At the beginnings he was an autonomist, but later became an independentist. His brother, Raphaël also became a militarist independentist as the president of the South Pacific Society of Miners. (This society was founded by those who wanted to assure the participation of the native Kanak people in the mining of the territory). Raphaël Pidjot and other leaders of the organization died in 2000 in a helicopter accident.
