= Marie-Paule Serve =

New Caledonian politician

Member of the Territorial Assembly
- In office 1977–1984
- Constituency: South

Personal details
- Born: 16 October 1941 (age 83); Haiphong, French Indochina

Marie-Paule Serve (née Charles, born 16 October 1941) was a French New Caledonian politician. She was one of two women elected to the Territorial Assembly of New Caledonia in 1977, the territory's first female legislators.

== Biography ==
Serve was born in Haiphong in French Indochina in 1941 and was educated at the Faculté Libre de Droit in Toulon. She married Yvau Sevre, with whom she had a daughter. Having moved to New Caledonia, she became president of the Fédération Feminine Calédonienne.

She also became involved in politics and was a Rally for Caledonia candidate in the 1977 elections. Alongside Edwige Antier, she became one of the first two women in the Territorial Assembly. She was re-elected in 1979, serving until the 1984 elections.
