= Solier =

Solier may refer to:

- Antoine Joseph Jean Solier (1792–1851), French naturalist, entomologist and plant collector
- Charles de Solier, comte de Morette (1480–1552), French soldier and diplomat
- Elie Solier (1914–1984), New Caledonian lawyer and politician
- François Solier (1558–1638), French Jesuit theologian
- Jean-Pierre Solié (1755–1812), also spelled Solier, French cellist and operatic singer
- Magaly Solier (born 1986), Peruvian actress and singer
- Pedro de Solier y Vargas (1573–1620), Roman Catholic prelate, Archbishop of Santo Domingo and Bishop of Puerto Rico

== See also ==
- Soliers, a commune in Basse-Normandie region, France
