= 2014 New Caledonia Super Ligue =

New Caledonia Super Ligue
- Season: 2014
- Champions: Magenta

The New Caledonia Super Ligue 2014 season was the 41st season of the FCF since its establishment in 1962. The season began on 6 March 2014. Gaïtcha represented the New Caledonia Super Ligue in the 2014–15 OFC Champions League after finishing Champions respectively in the 2013 New Caledonia Super Ligue competition.

The league was won by Magenta undefeated.

== Clubs ==
Team	Location	Stadium	Capacity	Manager
AGJP	Nouméa	Stade Numa-Daly	14,000	
Auteuil	Dumbéa	Stade Numa-Daly	14,000	
Gaïtcha	Nouméa	Stade Numa-Daly	14,000	(France) Christophe Oiremoin
Hienghène Sport	Hienghène	Stade Yoshida	5,000	
Kirikitr	Lifou	Stade de Hnassé	1,680	
Lössi	Nouméa	Stade Numa-Daly	14,000	
Magenta	Nouméa	Stade Numa-Daly	14,000	(France) Alain Moizan
Mont-Dore	Le Mont-Dore	Stade Boewa	2,000	
Ne Drehu	Lifou	Stade de Hnassé	1,680	
Thio Sport	Thio	Stade de Thio	300	
Tiga Sport	Nouméa	Stade Numa-Daly	14,000	
Wetr	Nouméa	Stade Numa-Daly	14,000	

== Standings ==
AS Kirikitr was relegated as worst team from outside Grande Terre. Half the league was deducted points after the season.

Pos	Team	Pld	W	D	L	GF	GA	GD	Pts	Qualification or relegation
1	Magenta (C)	22	20	2	0	69	23	+46	84	2016 OFC Champions League group stage
2	Lössi	22	17	2	3	59	32	+27	75	2016 OFC Champions League group stage
3	Hienghène Sport	22	13	6	3	69	27	+42	57 (Note: Points deductions for failure to provide referees and not fulfilling youth team obligations: Hienghène Sport (−10), Wetr (−2), Gaïtcha (−9), Tiga Sports (−1), Thio Sport (−10), AGJP (−12))	
4	Mont-Dore	22	7	7	8	36	41	−5	50	
5	Wetr	22	9	3	10	52	52	0	50	
6	Ne Drehu	22	6	7	9	36	43	−7	47	
7	Gaïtcha FCN	22	8	4	10	50	51	−1	41	
8	Tiga Sport	22	4	8	10	35	46	−11	41	
9	Kirikitr (R)	22	4	6	12	30	58	−28	40	Relegation to the 2015 Promotion d'Honneur
10	Auteuil	22	4	5	13	23	40	−17	39	
11	Thio Sport (R)	22	6	4	12	48	63	−15	34	Relegation to the 2015 Promotion d'Honneur
12	AGJP (R)	22	5	4	13	48	79	−31	29	Relegation to the 2015 Promotion d'Honneur

Source: RSSSF
Rules for classification: 1) Points, 2) Head to head, 3) Goal difference. 4 points for a win, 2 points for a draw, and 1 for a defeat.
(C) Champions; (R) Relegated
