= Elie Solier =

New Caledonian lawyer and politician (1914–1984)

Member of the General Council
- In office 1953–1957
- Constituency: South

Personal details
- Born: 17 May 1914; Nouméa, New Caledonia
- Died: 2 July 1984 (aged 70); Nouméa, New Caledonia

Elie Emile William Auguste Solier (17 May 1914 – 2 July 1984) was a New Caledonian lawyer and politician. He was a member of the General Council from 1953 to 1957.

== Biography ==
Solier was born in Nouméa in 1914 to Emile Marius Basile Solier and Claire Hilda Hodgson. He attended university in France, where he studied law. Returning to New Caledonia, he became one of the leading lawyers in the territory, and began serving as a magistrate. He married Winnifred Violetta Nicholls in 1937, with whom he had three children.

During World War II he helped oust the pro-Vichy administration in 1940. In May 1942 he and several other key figures fell out with Georges Thierry d'Argenlieu, a visiting representative of Charles de Gaulle, resulting in him being deported to Walpole Island alongside Governor Henri Sautot. However, they were returned to New Caledonia shortly afterwards following protests.

In 1953 he was elected to the General Council from the South constituency as part of the Bonneaud group, serving until the 1957 elections. In the same year he and Winnifred divorced and he married Odette Antoinette Augustine Antoniou, with whom he had a daughter.

He died in Nouméa in July 1984 at the age of 70.
