= 1967 New Caledonian legislative election =

Legislative elections were held in New Caledonia on 9 July 1967. The result was a victory for the Caledonian Union, which won 22 of the 35 seats.

== Campaign ==
A total of 174 candidates contested the 35 seats. The New Caledonian branch of the Union for the New Republic (led by Georges Chatenay) called for more autonomy and for a second smelting company to be introduced to the territory to create competition for Société Le Nickel.

== Results ==
The three minor party Assembly members were sympathetic to the Caledonian Union.

Party	Seats	+/–
Caledonian Union	22	+4
Entente UNR	10	+1
New Caledonia	2	New
Union of Licensees and Landowners	1	New
Total	35	+5
Source: Le Borgne

=== Elected members ===
Constituency	Member	Party	Notes
East (7 seats)	Roland Caron	Caledonian Union	
East (7 seats)	Paul Malignon	Entente	
East (7 seats)	Similien Nahiet	Caledonian Union	
East (7 seats)	Kiolet Néa Galet	Entente	Re-elected
East (7 seats)	Edmond Nebayes	Caledonian Union	
East (7 seats)	Théophile Wakolo Pouyé	Caledonian Union	Re-elected
East (7 seats)	Émile Wénou Néchero	Caledonian Union	Re-elected
Islands (5 seats)	Jean Caba	Caledonian Union	
Islands (5 seats)	Yann Céléné Uregeï	Caledonian Union	
Islands (5 seats)	Raof Jomessy	Caledonian Union	
Islands (5 seats)	Jean Wanapo	Caledonian Union	
Islands (5 seats)	Léonard Waneissi	Entente	
South (16 seats)	Jean-Pierre Aïfa	Caledonian Union	
South (16 seats)	Alain Bernut	New Caledonia	
South (16 seats)	Georges Chatenay	Entente	Re-elected
South (16 seats)	Evenor de Greslan	Caledonian Union	Re-elected
South (16 seats)	Roger Delaveuve	Union of Licensees and Landowners	
South (16 seats)	Max Frouin	Caledonian Union	
South (16 seats)	Paul Griscelli	Caledonian Union	
South (16 seats)	René Hénin	Entente	Re-elected (previously in West constituency)
South (16 seats)	Henri Lafleur	Entente	Re-elected (previously RC)
South (16 seats)	Jean Lèques	Caledonian Union	
South (16 seats)	Armand Ohlen	Caledonian Union	Re-elected
South (16 seats)	Claude Parazols	Entente	Re-elected
South (16 seats)	Édouard Pentecost	Entente	
South (16 seats)	Rock Pidjot	Caledonian Union	Re-elected
South (16 seats)	Gérald Rousseau	New Caledonia	
South (16 seats)	André Vacher	Caledonian Union	
West (7 seats)	Arhan Boahoume	Caledonian Union	
West (7 seats)	André Bressler	Caledonian Union	
West (7 seats)	Jean-Pierre Le Marrec	Entente	
West (7 seats)	Georges Nagle	Caledonian Union	Re-elected
West (7 seats)	Paul Napoarea	Caledonian Union	
West (7 seats)	Gabriel Païta	Caledonian Union	Re-elected
West (7 seats)	Roger Pêne	Entente	
Source: Le Borgne, Congress

== Aftermath ==
Following the elections, Entente leader Henri Lafleur submitted a petition to annul the results. The petition was rejected on 28 August. He appealed on 4 November. Rock Pidjot also filed a complaint about the election in East constituency, where Caledonian Union candidate and High Chief Goa Alphonse (who was expected to be elected) lost after a fortune teller told his tribe that the chief would die if elected. The complaint was rejected.

André Vacher resigned from the Assembly on 8 August 1967 and was replaced by Charles Attiti. Paul Malignon resigned on 14 June 1970 and was replaced by Marcel Dubois. Jean Caba died on 8 September 1970 and was replaced by Kecine Léonard Une. Lafleur resigned on 20 November 1971 and was replaced by Lionel Cherrier. Edouard Pentecost died on 5 October 1971 and was replaced by Michel Kauma.
