= Paul Katrei =

Member of the Territorial Assembly
- In office 1957–1967
- Constituency: Islands

Personal details
- Died: 10 April 1967; Nouméa, New Caledonia
- Political party: Caledonian Union

Paul Jewine Katrei (died 10 April 1967) was a New Caledonian chief and politician. He served as a member of the Territorial Assembly between 1957 and his death in 1967.

== Biography ==
Katrei became High Chief of Medu on Maré Island in 1945, succeeding Alfred Kaiwahtr. His succession was disputed by Raphaël Hnaku and a fight took place, in which Katrei was wounded by Bibiane Kongore. However, he was able to retain his chieftainship.

He was elected to the Territorial Assembly from the Islands constituency in 1957 as a representative of the Caledonian Union. He was re-elected in 1958 and 1962.

Katrei died in Nouméa in April 1967 at the age of 57.
