= Stade Rivière Salée =

- Bernard-Ukeiwé Stadium
- Interactive map of Stade Rivière Salée
- Full name: Salt River Stadium Complex
- Address: Rue Fernand-Colardeau, Rivière Salée, 98800; Nouméa; New Caledonia
- Coordinates: 22.2318°S 166.4636°E
- Capacity: 3,000
- Surface: Artificial turf

Construction
- Groundbreaking: 1995
- Built: 1995–2004
- Opened: 2004
- Expanded: 2001

Tenants
- AS Kirikitr: Major sporting events hosted; 2011 Pacific Games men's football tournament

Stade Rivière Salée, also known as the Bernard-Ukeiwé Stadium and the Salt River Stadium Complex, is a football stadium located in Noumea, New Caledonia. The stadium has a capacity of 3,000. It hosts the home games of a number of local football teams, including AS Kirikitr, as well as serving as a host venue for the 2011 Pacific Games men's football tournament.

The stadium is often known as the Bernard-Ukeiwé Stadium, named after New Caledonian footballer and politician Bernard Ukeiwé.

== History ==
Construction for the Stade Rivière Salée began in 1995, and plans to extend the stadium were accepted in 2001; the stadium was opened in 2004.

The stadium hosted every Group "A" match during the 2011 Pacific Games from 27 August 2011 to 5 September 2011. In hosting Group "A" matches, the Stade Rivière Salée held the games of American Samoa, Guam, Solomon Islands, Tuvalu, and Vanuatu.

The stadium now hosts matches for the club AS Kirikitr.
