= 1984 New Caledonian legislative election =

← 1979	18 November 1984	1985 →
- All 36 seats in Congress; 18 seats needed for a majority
Party	Leader	Vote %	Seats	+/–
RPCR	Jacques Lafleur	70.87	34	+19
LKS	Nidoïsh Naisseline	7.33	6	New
National Front	Roger Galliot	6.05	1	New
FNSC	Jean-Pierre Aïfa	4.45	1	−6
This lists parties that won seats. See the complete results below.
President of Congress before	President of Congress after
Jean Pierre-Aïfa; FNSC	Dick Ukeiwé; RPCR

Legislative elections were held in New Caledonia on 18 November 1984. They had originally been planned for July, but were postponed due to threats by the Independence Front to boycott and disrupt the vote. Most members of the Front subsequently merged into the Kanak and Socialist National Liberation Front in September, and proceeded to boycott the elections. As a result, the Rally for Caledonia in the Republic won 34 of the 42 seats in a landslide victory. Following the elections, Dick Ukeiwé became President of the Government.

== Conduct ==
The elections were marred by violence; several houses, town halls and shops were set on fire, with FLNKS members clashing with security forces. FLNKS also took a French administrator hostage on Lifou Island and occupied a police station in north-east of the territory. On election day 200 Kanaks entered a polling station in Canala and destroyed ballot papers.

== Results ==
Overall voter turnout was just over 50%, but estimated to be only 15% amongst the Kanak community.

Party	Votes	%	Seats	+/–
Rally for Caledonia in the Republic	27,851	70.87	34	+19
Kanak Socialist Liberation	2,879	7.33	6	New
National Front	2,379	6.05	1	New
Federation for a New Caledonian Society	1,748	4.45	1	–6
Seven other parties	4,439	11.30	0	–
Total	39,296	100.00	42	+6
Valid votes	39,296	98.90		
Invalid/blank votes	439	1.10		
Total votes	39,735	100.00		
Registered voters/turnout	79,271	50.13		
Source: Clark

=== Elected members ===
Constituency	Member	Party	Notes
East (9 seats)	Jules Ate	Rally for Caledonia	
East (9 seats)	Félix Belle	Rally for Caledonia	
East (9 seats)	Roger Galliot	National Front	
East (9 seats)	Jacques Mainguet	Rally for Caledonia	
East (9 seats)	Auguste Parawi-Reybas	Rally for Caledonia	Re-elected
East (9 seats)	Mathias Nechero	Kanak Socialist Liberation	
East (9 seats)	Maurice Nénou	Rally for Caledonia	
East (9 seats)	Francis Poadouy	Kanak Socialist Liberation	Re-elected
East (9 seats)	Henri Wetta	Rally for Caledonia	
Islands (7 seats)	Basile Citré	Kanak Socialist Liberation	
Islands (7 seats)	Jacques Lalié	Kanak Socialist Liberation	
Islands (7 seats)	Nidoïsh Naisseline	Kanak Socialist Liberation	Re-elected
Islands (7 seats)	Robert Naxue Paouta	Rally for Caledonia	
Islands (7 seats)	William Trongadjo	Kanak Socialist Liberation	
Islands (7 seats)	Simijane Yeiwie	Rally for Caledonia	
Islands (7 seats)	Goïne Ferdinand Wamo	Rally for Caledonia	
South (17 seats)	Victorin Boewa	Rally for Caledonia	
South (17 seats)	Jean-Claude Briault	Rally for Caledonia	
South (17 seats)	Françoise Chaverot	Rally for Caledonia	
South (17 seats)	Albert Etuvé	Rally for Caledonia	
South (17 seats)	Georges Faure	Rally for Caledonia	Re-elected
South (17 seats)	Max Frouin	Rally for Caledonia	Re-elected
South (17 seats)	Justin Guillemard	Rally for Caledonia	Re-elected (previously in West)
South (17 seats)	Wassissi Kapua	Rally for Caledonia	
South (17 seats)	Daniel Laborde	Rally for Caledonia	
South (17 seats)	Jacques Lafleur	Rally for Caledonia	Re-elected
South (17 seats)	Henri Leleu	Rally for Caledonia	
South (17 seats)	Jean Lèques	Rally for Caledonia	Re-elected
South (17 seats)	Philippa Ma-Moon	Rally for Caledonia	
South (17 seats)	Claude Lemaître	Rally for Caledonia	
South (17 seats)	Harold Martin	Rally for Caledonia	
South (17 seats)	Patrice Muller	Rally for Caledonia	
South (17 seats)	Atélémo Taofifenua	Rally for Caledonia	
West (9 seats)	Jean-Pierre Aïfa	Federation for a New Caledonian Society	Re-elected
West (9 seats)	Robert Frouin	Rally for Caledonia	
West (9 seats)	Jean Guindon	Rally for Caledonia	
West (9 seats)	Sosimo Malalua	Rally for Caledonia	
West (9 seats)	Michaël Meunier-Malignon	Rally for Caledonia	
West (9 seats)	Robert Saggio	Rally for Caledonia	
West (9 seats)	Apou Thidjite	Rally for Caledonia	
West (9 seats)	Dick Ukeiwé	Rally for Caledonia	Re-elected (previously in Islands)
West (9 seats)	Naco Voudjo	Rally for Caledonia	

== Aftermath ==
Violence continued after the elections; FLNKS members occupied the police station in Thio on 20 November and held five policemen hostage. Rebels set up a 'Government of Kanaky' in early December, headed by Jean-Marie Tjibaou. European settlers in Hienghène killed ten FLNKS militants on 5 December, including two brothers of Tjibaou.

Dick Ukeiwé became President of the Government, heading a ten-member cabinet.

Position	Member
President of the Government	Dick Ukeiwé
Minister of Agriculture	Michel Kauma
Minister of Culture	Joseph Tidjine
Minister of Economy and Finances	Pierre Frogier
Minister of Education	Delin Wéma
Minister of Health and Social Affairs	Pierre Maresca
Minister of Labour	Denis Milliard
Minister of Natural Resources	Yves Magnier
Minister of Tourism, Transport and Communications	Charles Lavoix
Minister of Youth and Sport	Goïne Wamo
