= Pesquet =

Pesquet is a surname. Notable people with the surname include:

- Robert Pesquet (1917–2010), French politician
- Thomas Pesquet (born 1978), French aerospace engineer, pilot, and European Space Agency astronaut

== See also ==
- Pesquet's parrot, a parrot species
