= Robert Pesquet =

French politician

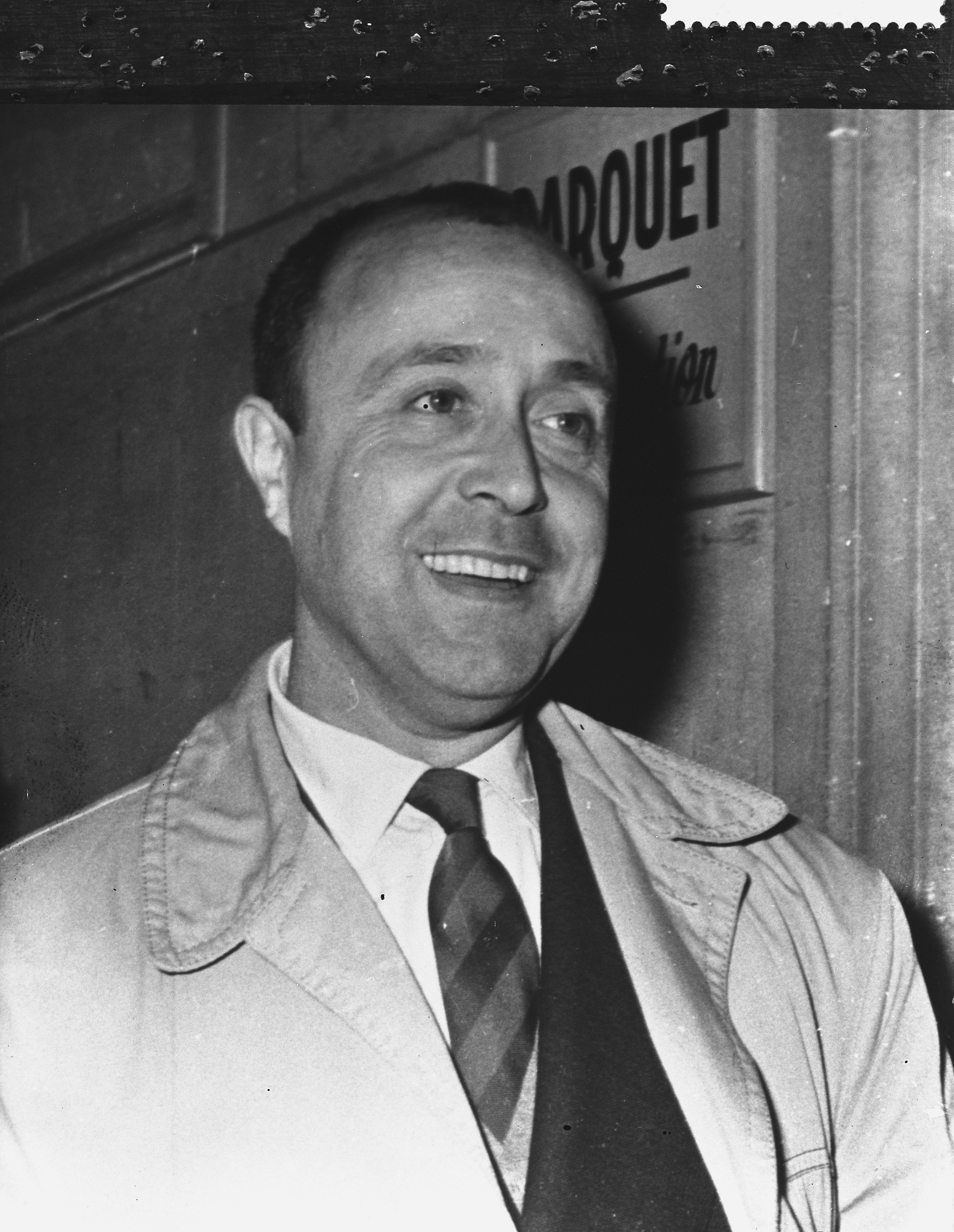
- Robert Pesquet on december 5, 1959
- Born: 17 April 1917; Kenitra, Morocco
- Died: 11 December 2010 (aged 93)
- Occupation: Politician

Robert Pesquet (9 April 1917 – 11 December 2010) was a French politician.

Pesquet was born in Kenitra, Morocco (then called Port-Lyautey). He represented the National Centre of Social Republicans as a deputy for Loir-et-Cher in the National Assembly from 1956 to 1958.

In 1959, Pesquet was imprisoned for his role in activities on behalf of the Organisation armée secrète and he was also implicated in a failed assassination attempt against François Mitterrand, which became known as the Observatory Affair. Having fled to Portugal after receiving a 20-year sentence, he secretly returned, pretending to be a carpenter.

In 2003, he attempted a political comeback at the age of 86.
