= James Louis Daly =

New Caledonian businessman and politician

Member of the General Council
- In office 1930–1940, 1953–1957
- Constituency: South (1953–1957)

Personal details
- Born: 14 December 1897 Nouméa, New Caledonia
- Died: 23 March 1963 (aged 65) Nouméa, New Caledonia

James Louis Daly (14 December 1897 – 23 March 1963) was a New Caledonian businessman and politician. He served as a member of the General Council from 1930 until 1940, and again from 1953 until 1957.

== Biography ==
Daly was born in Nouméa on 14 December 1897. He joined the army during World War I, serving in the Mediterranean. He received the croix de guerre, and later became president of the Returned Soldiers Association. He was a director of Maison Barrau, one of the territory's major companies, a member of the Chamber of Agriculture and a judge in the Commercial Court.

In 1930 he became a member of the General Council, winning re-election in 1931, 1934 and 1937, serving until 1940. He was vice-president of the legislature from 1936 until 1940. He returned to the Council following the 1953 elections, when he was elected in the South constituency.

He died at his home in Nouméa in March 1963. His funeral was described by Pacific Islands Monthly as the largest in the town's history.
