= Daniel Goa =

New Caledonian politician

Daniel Goa (born 1953) is a New Caledonian politician elected to head the Caledonian Union in 2012. He was a Petitioner on the Question of New Caledonia at the Fourth Committee on Special Political and Decolonization of the United Nations.
