= Henri Lafleur =

New Caledonian politician

Member of the Senate
- In office 1959–1974
- Preceded by: Armand Ohlen
- Succeeded by: Lionel Cherrier

Member of the Council of the Republic
- In office 1947–1955
- Succeeded by: Armand Ohlen

Member of the Territorial Assembly
- In office 1938–40, 1947–53, 1957–59, 1962–71
- Constituency: South

Personal details
- Born: 1902; Nouméa, New Caledonia
- Died: 1974

Henri Lafleur (1902 – 1974) was a New Caledonian politician. A member of the Senate of France from 1959 until 1974, he sat as an Independent Republican.

He was elected to the General Assembly in the 1946–47 elections, and was subsequently elected as the New Caledonian member of the Council of the Republic. He did not contest the 1953 elections, but was re-elected to the renamed Territorial Assembly in 1957. He was forced to resign from the Assembly when he was elected to the Senate in 1959, but returned to the island legislature again after being elected in 1962. He was re-elected to the Assembly in 1967, but resigned from the body in 1971 to concentrate on his work as a Senator.

His son, Jacques, was the speaker of the Congress of New Caledonia and a leading light in the anti-independence party who died in 2010.
