= Pierre Declercq =

New Caledonian politician (1938 - 1981)

Pierre Declercq (May 10, 1938 - September 19, 1981) was a French New Caledonian politician and a noted supporter of independence.

Declercq was born in Halluin, Nord, Metropolitan France. He moved to New Caledonia to become a teacher in the 1960s. Later going into politics, he became secretary of the Caledonian Union. The President of the Republic met with him and other members of the CU on 19 September 1981. He was assassinated in his house in Nouméa not long after. His killers have never been apprehended.

== Biography ==
Pierre Declercq first visited New Caledonia in 1964 and 1965 while serving in the military as part of a cooperative program. After returning to mainland France to earn a bachelor’s degree in economics, he taught at the Sacré-Cœur middle school in Tourcoing during the 1966–67 school year. Returning to New Caledonia in 1968, he taught in the private sector there until 1971.

His political involvement gradually took shape. In 1977, he became secretary-general of the Caledonian Union, under the presidency of Rock Pidjot, and served in the Territorial Assembly of New Caledonia from 1977 to 1981.

He was received by President François Mitterrand on July 21, 1981, along with a delegation from the Caledonian Union. On that occasion, a manifesto calling for the independence of the Kanak people was presented to the President.

On September 19, 1981, he was shot and killed at his home in Robinson, near Nouméa .He was buried on September 23 at the La Conception tribal cemetery.

His killers were never apprehended. The investigation, often criticized as superficial, identified two suspects. However, under the amnesty law of January 10, 1990, a dismissal order definitively brought the criminal proceedings against them to an end.
