= Edwige Antier =

French paediatrician and politician (born 1942)

Member of the New Caledonian Territorial Assembly
- In office 1977–1979
- Constituency: South

Member of the National Assembly for Paris's 4th constituency
- In office 23 July 2009 – 16 June 2012
- Preceded by: Pierre Lellouche

Personal details
- Born: 15 May 1942 (age 83) Toulon, France
- Party: Radical Party; UDI
- Profession: Pediatrician

Edwige Antier (born 15 May 1942) is a French paediatrician and former politician. She was one of two women elected to the Territorial Assembly of New Caledonia in 1977, the territory's first female legislators. She served in the French National Assembly as a representative of Paris's 4th constituency.

== Biography ==
Antier was born in Toulon in 1942. After an internship at the Assistance Publique – Hôpitaux de Paris, she moved to New Caledonia in 1972, where she worked as a paediatrician and became a member of the territory's Council of the Order of Physicians.

She also became involved in politics and headed the Union for the Renewal of New Caledonia party for the 1977 elections. Considered a party of right-wing intelligentsia, it won a single seat in the South constituency, taken by Antier-Lagarde. Alongside Marie-Paule Serve, she became one of the first two women in the Territorial Assembly. She was elected vice president of the Assembly, and became president of the Health Commission.

In 1979 she returned to France, she worked at the Baudelocque maternity hospital and in a private maternity hospital, as well as practicing at a medical office in Paris. She also started a broadcasting career, joining France Inter in 1981 and then France Info from 1987. She also published several books for parents.

In 2001, she became a member of the board of directors of the Assistance Publique – Hôpitaux de Paris. In the same year she was elected as a city councillor in Paris, serving until 2008. In the 2007 National Assembly elections, she was elected as a substitute for Union for a Popular Movement deputy Pierre Lellouche. After Lellouche was made Secretary of State for European Affairs, Antier became a full member of the National Assembly in July 2009. She became a member of the Social Affairs Commission, and authored a bill aiming to abolish corporal punishment for children. After losing her seat in the 2012 elections, she was a founder member of the Union of Democrats and Independents.
