= Marie-Claude Tjibaou =

New Caledonian activist and politician

- Born: Marie-Claude Wetta; January 10, 1949 (age 77); Ponérihouen, New Caledonia,
- Occupations: Social activist; politician; athlete
- Spouse: Jean-Marie Tjibaou
- Awards: Chevalier of the French Legion of Honour

Marie-Claude Tjibaou is a former medal-winning athlete, Kanak activist and politician, and widow of the independence movement leader in New Caledonia, Jean-Marie Tjibaou.

== Early life ==
Marie-Claude "Andie" Tjibaou was born Marie-Claude Wetta on 10 January 1949 in Ponérihouen on the north coast of Grand Terre, the main island of New Caledonia. She is a member of the Néouta tribe. Her father, Doui Matayo Wetta (1917–1980), was a founding member in 1947 of the Association des indigènes calédoniens et loyaltiens français (Association of Native Caledonians and French Loyalists – AICLF) and one of the first nine Melanesians to sit on the general council of the French territory of New Caledonia. He was Minister of Public Relations, Information, Basic Education and Cooperation from 1958 to 1962.

Tjibaou was very athletic. She represented New Caledonia in the South Pacific Games, winning a gold medal in the shot put at the 1969 games in Port Moresby, Papua New Guinea and the shot put and discus at the 1971 games in Papeete, French Polynesia. She also won silver medals in 1966 in Nouméa and 1975 in Guam.

Tjibaou worked as a rural advisor in the Basic Education Service of New Caledonia from 1971 to 1975. It was at this time that she met Jean-Marie Tjibaou, a former priest, who had just graduated in ethnology. Although he was a Catholic and was promoting the idea of Kanak independence and she came from a Protestant family that wished to remain a part of France, they married and had six children.

== Work and cultural activities ==
Working for the Youth and Sports Service from 1974 to 1976, Tjibaou actively participated in the organization of the Melanesia 2000 festival, the first festival of Melanesian arts, which was held in Nouméa, capital of New Caledonia, in September 1975. Her husband and father were also involved. She then joined the Interior and Islands Development Organization (ODIL) from 1976 to 1985, before setting up development projects in the North Province for the Regional Development Office (ODER) and the Rural Development and Land Development Agency (ADRAF). By this time, her husband had become the leader of the Kanak and Socialist National Liberation Front (FLNKS) and of the self-proclaimed "Provisional Government of Kanaky".

After the murder of her husband on 4 May 1989 in Ouvéa in the Loyalty Islands Province, Tjibaou participated in the creation in 1990 of the Kanak Culture Development Agency (ADCK), and became its president. She was one of the main proponents of the Jean-Marie Tjibaou Cultural Centre. She became a member of the Pacific Islands Museum Association (PIMA) and president of the organizing committee for New Caledonia's participation in the Festival of Pacific Arts, held in the Cook Islands in 1992 and Samoa in 1996, and which organized the festival when it took place in New Caledonia in 2000. She has been a member of the board of La Première, a radio and television service for French overseas territories.

== Social and political activities ==
Tjibaou founded an association against sexual violence, SOS Violences sexuelles, in 1992 and is the honorary president of the association. She became vice-president of the Association for the Protection Against Alcohol Abuse (APAA). She was made a member of the Economic and Social Council of New Caledonia until 1999, and was then appointed to the French Economic, Social and Environmental Council (CESE), as a representative of the overseas territories of France, remaining on the Council until the end of 2015. She ran for the French Senate as an FLNKS candidate in 2001 but was narrowly beaten. From 1995 to 2000, she was a municipal councillor in Hienghène, a town on the east coast of Grande Terre, of which her husband was mayor from 1977 until his death. In 2014 she campaigned to become mayor of Nouméa, but was unsuccessful. In the same year she was a candidate for the Overseas Territories of France European Parliament constituency, without success.

== Awards and honours ==
- Tjibaou was made a Chevalier of the French Legion of Honour in 2000.
