= Dokucas Naisseline =

New Caledonian chief

Dokucas Naisseline is the current chief of Guahma and high chief of Maré in the Loyalty Islands of New Caledonia. He acceded to the chieftaincy at the age of 33, following the abdication of his father Nidoïsh Naisseline on 6 June 2007. The Naisseline family has held the title of high chief since the 18th Century.

His official enthronement as high chief was attended by over 2,000 people. In the speech he delivered, he said: "I have not received any special preparation to take over my father, and I know it's a very heavy task laid upon me. My ambition today is to listen to people here and to be closer to their concerns."

Dokucas is a Kanak of the Nétché tribe.
