= Melanesia 2000 =

Melanesia 2000 was the first festival of Melanesian arts, first held in Noumea, New Caledonia in September 1975, supported by Jean-Marie Tjibaou. It had its origins in the women's association, Smiling Melanesian Village Women's Groups which was formed in 1971 and advocated the idea of a cultural festival to promote Kanak arts.
