= 1934 New Caledonian legislative election =

Legislative elections were held in New Caledonia in 1934 to elect half of the General Council. A first round was held on 14 October, with a second round on 28 October.

== Electoral system ==
The elected Members of the General Council were elected using the two-round system for six-year terms. Half of the Council was elected every three years. The Chamber of Agriculture and Governor nominated additional members to the Council.

== Results ==
The elected members were Beaumont, Berges, Collardo, James Louis Daly, Laborderie, Milliard, Paladini and Terrier. Governor Bernard Jacques Victorin Siadous appointed Louis Imboult and Souland, whilst Louis Page, Andre Robert and Michel Verges were nominated by the Chamber of Agriculture.
