= Melanesian Progressive Union =

Melanesian Progressive Union Union progressiste mélanésienne
- Leader: Victor Tutugoro
- Founded: 1974
- Headquarters: rue Paul Doumer - Centre-ville; 98805 Nouméa
- Ideology: Separatism; Social democracy
- National affiliation: None, close to the Socialist Party
- Colours: Red
- Seats in the Congress: 1 / 54
- Seats in the South Province: 0 / 40
- Seats in the North Province: 2 / 22
- Seats in the Loyalty Islands Province: 0 / 14

The Melanesian Progressive Union (French: Union progressiste mélanésienne, UPM) is a militant socialist pro-independence political party in New Caledonia. It is a component of the National Union for Independence, which in turn is one of the two components of the Kanak and Socialist National Liberation Front (FLNKS).

== History ==
The UPM was founded in 1974 by Melanesian supporters of the Caledonian Union who were opposed to the leader of the party, the white Maurice Lenormand. At first a Trotskyist political party close to the LCR in France, the party has since moderated to become a social democratic party.
