= AS Kirikitr =

- Full name: AS Kirikitr Mou
- Founded: 28 October 1988
- Stadium: Stade Rivière Salée
- Capacity: 3,000
- Chairman: André Cima
- Manager: Jules Hméun
- League: New Caledonia Second Level
- 2020: Unknown league position
Home colors	Away colors

AS Kirikitr, also known as AS Kirkitir Mou, is a New Caledonian football club located in Lifou, New Caledonia which currently plays in the New Caledonia Second Level.

== History ==
The cricket club AS Kirikitr was founded in April 1974 and the football club was founded on 28 October 1988.

They placed third in the New Caledonian Super Ligue in 2003–04 and 2007–08, and were relegated in 2010. They would spend one more season in the New Caledonian Super Ligue in 2014 before being relegated during the same season.

AS Kirikitr Under-19 won the Yeiwéné Cup in 2019.

== Honours ==
AS Kirikitr honours
Honour	No.	Years
Champion of Loyalty Islands	3	2007–08, 2008–09, 2010
Yeiwéné Cup	1	2019
