= Bernard Ukeiwé =

New Caledonian politician and footballer (1953-2008)

Bernard Ukeiwé (24 June 1953 - 23 July 2008) was a New Caledonian politician and footballer. The son of former senator Dick Ukeiwé, he played for the New Caledonia national football team. A Kanak, he opposed independence from France.

As his father withdrew from political life, Bernard Ukeiwé continued his legacy. From 2006, he was vice president of the Rassemblement-UMP group. In 2007, he was elected deputy to MP Gaël Yanno, and in March 2008 became deputy mayor of Nouméa. He died of a heart attack four months later.
