= Gaston Morlet =

French cyclist

Personal information
- Born: 30 September 1907 Rouen
- Died: 16 December 1994 (aged 87) Lagny-sur-Marne

Cycling career
- Sport: Cycling
- Discipline: Road
- Role: Rider

Gaston Morlet (30 September 1907 - 16 Décember 1994) was a French racing cyclist. He rode in the 1925 Tour de France.
