= 1945 New Caledonian legislative election =

Legislative elections were held in New Caledonia in January 1945. The first round of voting was held on 7 January and the second round on 24 January.

== Background ==
The General Council elected in 1940 was dissolved following the 1940 New Caledonia coup d'état, which saw the territory defect from Vichy France to Free France. Governor Henri Sautot subsequently created a 12-member nominated Administrative Council. Sautot's successor Henri Montchamp proposed a new 15-seat council, and elections were scheduled for 21 March 1943, before being postponed until 30 May. However, French leader Charles de Gaulle subsequently postponed them again, claiming that wartime elections were inadmissible. The Governor then suggested that the existing council members could be retained, alongside ten more appointed members.

In early 1944, the French administration promised fresh elections and voter rolls began to be drawn up. However, they were subsequently postponed once more. Later in the year a decree re-established a 15-member General Council and dissolved the Administrative Council.

== Electoral system ==
Members were elected using the two-round system. Although women had recently been enfranchised in France, the lack of time to prepare a new voter roll meant that female suffrage was not introduced for the 1945 elections in New Caledonia. Despite not being able to vote, women were allowed to run as candidates, and two were nominated by the Social Progress bloc.

== Campaign ==
A total of 50 candidates contested the 15 seats in the first round, five of whom were independents. Seventeen withdrew prior to the second round. The candidates were from three main groupings; the Comité Caledonien led by Pierre Bergès, Social Progress (also known as the Labour group) led by Florindo Paladini and the Union Party (also known as the Conservatives or Ballande Party due to its association with Maison Ballande, the main commercial company in the territory).

The Union Party represented commercial and financial sectors and put forward a manifesto calling for autonomy in the areas of customs and economic and financial policy. The Social Progress group called for the breakup of large agricultural estates and improved job opportunities for the local population.

Prior to the elections, eleven Comité Caledonien members published an advertisement in the local media naming four of the Union Party candidates as supporters of Philippe Pétain.

== Results ==
Voter turnout in the first round was around 50%. Bergès was the only candidate elected in the first round. Prior to the second round, the Comité Caledonien and Social Progress blocs formed a Popular Front alliance to run against the Union Party.

The Comité Caledonien and Union Party drew most of their support from rural areas, whilst the Social Progress group's voter base was concentrated in Nouméa.

Party	First round			Second round			Total seats
Party	Votes	%	Seats	Votes	%	Seats	Total seats
Union Party	10,523		0			2	2
Comité Caledonien	8,452		1			7	8
Social Progress	8,417		0			5	5
Independents			0			0	0
Total			1			14	15
Source: Pacific Islands Monthly
