= Henri Bonneaud =

New Caledonian politician

President of the General Council
- In office 1947–1952
- Preceded by: Pierre Bergès
- Succeeded by: Pierre Bergès

Member of the General Council
- In office 1945–1957

Personal details
- Born: 1907
- Died: 2 March 1957 (aged 49); Paris, France
- Political party: Union Party

Henri Bonneaud (1907 – 2 March 1957) was a New Caledonian businessman and politician.

== Biography ==
An established businessman, Bonneaud served as director of Établissements Ballande, and was vice-president of the Nouméa Chamber of Commerce.

After World War II Bonneaud entered politics. He was elected to the General Council for the Union Party (also known as the Ballande Party) in the 1945 elections. He soon became leader of the party, and on 15 November 1947 he became President of the General Council, a role he held until 1952.

He died on 2 March 1957 whilst on a visit to Paris to protest against the Loi-cadre, which would have given equal voting rights to Kanaks.
