= Henri Naisseline =

New Caledonian politician (1911–1973)

Henri Naisseline (born 21 May 1911 - 1973 ) was a New Caledonian politician. He served for some time as chief of the Guhama region on the island of Maré. His son, Nidoïsh, succeeded him as chief before going on to a career in island politics.

Naisseline rallied to the Free French movement in 1940 and later joined the Caledonian Communist Party in 1945. He was elected to the territorial assembly in 1957 as a Gaullist and was awarded the Legion of Honour in 1959.
