= Nidoïsh Naisseline =

New Caledonian politician (1945–2015)

2nd President of Loyalty Islands Province
- In office July 14, 1995 – May 9, 1999
- Preceded by: Richard Kaloï
- Succeeded by: Robert Xowie

High Chief of Guahma
- In office 1973–2007
- Preceded by: Henri Naisseline
- Succeeded by: Dokucas Naisseline

Personal details
- Born: June 27, 1945 Nece, Maré Island, New Caledonia
- Died: June 3, 2015 (aged 69) Noumea, New Caledonia
- Party: Party of Kanak Liberation (1975-1981); Kanak Socialist Liberation (1981-2015)

Nidoïsh Naisseline (June 27, 1945, in Guahma on Maré Island – June 3, 2015, in Nouméa) was a New Caledonian politician. A Kanak of the Nétché tribe, born on the island of Maré, he was an advocate of New Caledonian independence. He succeeded his father Henri as high chief of the Guahma district in 1973; on June 6, 2007, he abdicated in favour of his son, Dokucas.

He had also served in the Congress of New Caledonia. He was the leader of the Kanak Socialist Liberation.
