= Jean-Marie Tjibaou =

New Calaedonian politician

Vice-president of the New-Caledonia Council of government
- In office 18 June 1982 – 6 September 1984
- Preceded by: Dick Ukeiwé
- Succeeded by: Dick Ukeiwé

Mayor of Hienghène
- In office 1977–1989
- Preceded by: Yves de Villelongue
- Succeeded by: Joseph Karié Bwarhat

President of Kanak and Socialist National Liberation Front
- In office 1984–1989
- Preceded by: Founder
- Succeeded by: Paul Néaoutyine

President of Caledonian Union
- In office 1986–1989
- Preceded by: Rock Pidjot
- Succeeded by: François Burck

Personal details
- Born: 30 January 1936 Hienghène, Nouvelle-Calédonie
- Died: 4 May 1989 (aged 53) Ouvéa, Nouvelle-Calédonie
- Cause of death: Assassination by shooting
- Party: Kanak and Socialist National Liberation Front; Union calédonienne
- Spouse: Marie-Claude Wetta
- Children: Emmanuel Tjibaou
- Education: Faculté catholique de Lyon; École pratique des hautes études
- Profession: Catholic priest Fonctionnaire territoriale

Jean-Marie Tjibaou (French pronunciation: [ʒɑ̃ maʁi tʃibau]; 30 January 1936 – 4 May 1989) was a French politician in New Caledonia and leader of the Kanak independence movement.

He was assassinated in 1989 at the age of 53.

== Early life ==
Jean-Marie Tjibaou was born on January 30, 1936. As the son of a tribal chief, he was ordained a Catholic priest but abandoned his religious vocation for a life in political activism.

== Career ==
During the 1970s, he undertook a thesis in ethnology at the Sorbonne. While he did not complete his studies, he became engaged in cultural and ethnicity issues on New Caledonia. In 1975 he arranged the Melanesia 2000 festival, which emphasized the Kanak identity.

He was appointed mayor of Hienghène in 1977. In 1979, he was made territorial councillor in the newly-formed Independence Front. Additionally, he became the head of the pro-independence Kanak and Socialist National Liberation Front (FLNKS) in 1984.

In 1988, after the Ouvéa cave hostage taking that led to the deaths of 25 people in a pitched battle between Kanak hostage-takers and French special forces, Tjibaou signed the Matignon Agreements on behalf of the FLNKS. This entailed France agreeing to a series of institutional and economical provisions for the Kanaks, New Caledonians agreeing not to raise the issue of independence for 10 years, and both sides agreeing to an amnesty of the events in Ouvéa.

== Death ==
On May 4, 1989, Tjibaou and his vice-president Yeiwéné Yeiwéné were gunned down during a traditional Kanak ceremony on the island of Ouvéa in New Caledonia by another Kanak, Djubelly Wéa, a hardliner who viewed the Matignon Agreements as selling out the cause of independence. A cultural leader in the promotion of the indigenous Kanak culture, Wéa was shot and killed by Tjibaou's bodyguards after the attack. Witnesses said other gunmen were involved.

== Family ==
His son, Emmanuel Tjibaou, is also a Kanak independentist. He became a French MP in 2024.

== Honors ==
The modern Jean-Marie Tjibaou Cultural Centre, designed by Italian architect Renzo Piano, is named in his honour.

== See also ==
- List of peace activists
