= National Centre of Social Republicans =

Gaullist political party in France (1954–1958)

National Centre of Social Republicans Centre national des républicains sociaux
- Leader: Jacques Chaban-Delmas
- Founded: 17 June 1954
- Dissolved: 1 October 1958
- Preceded by: Rally of the French People
- Succeeded by: Union for the New Republic
- Headquarters: Paris, France
- Ideology: Gaullism
- Political position: Right-wing
- National affiliation: Republican Front

Party flag

The National Centre of Social Republicans (Centre national des républicains sociaux, CNRS), or Social Republicans (Républicains sociaux, RS), was a French Gaullist political party founded in 1954. The party succeeded the Rally of the French People, but was not backed by Charles De Gaulle. The party did poorly in the 1956 parliamentary elections (relative to the RFP's performance in the 1951 elections).

Its president was Jacques Chaban-Delmas. It ceased to exist in 1958.

== See also ==
- Rally of the French People
- Union for the New Republic
