= Lionel Cherrier =

New Caledonian politician

Lionel Cherrier (17 November 1929 – 25 October 2016, born in Nakéty, near Canala) was a New Caledonian politician. He served in the Senate of France from 1974 until 1983, and was an Independent Republican.
