= Dick Ukeiwé =

New Caledonian politician

Dick Ukeiwé (13 December 1928 – 3 September 2013) was a New Caledonian politician. Born in Lifou, France, he represented the island in the French Senate from 1983 until 1992, and was a member of the Rally for the Republic. He served as President of the Congress of New Caledonia from 1985 to 1988. His son, Bernard Ukeiwé (1953–2008), was also a New Caledonian politician. Ukeiwé died, aged 84, on 3 September 2013 in Dumbéa.
