= Rock Pidjot =

New Caledonian politician (1907–1990)

Rock Déo Pidjot (November 8, 1907 – November 23, 1990), also known as Roch Pidjot, was a New Caledonian politician of Kanak descent. Initially an advocate of greater autonomy for New Caledonia within France, he later became a supporter of independence. He served in the National Assembly of France from 1964 until 1986, during which he sat with several parliamentary groups before becoming affiliated with the French Socialist Party. He remains, as of 2024, one of only two independence-supporting deputies New Caledonia has elected to the National Assembly, the other being his eventual successor in that distinction, Emmanuel Tjibaou.

== Early life and political beginnings ==
Pidjot was born in the village of La Conception, a Kanak tribal community and Catholic mission site within what is now the commune of Mont-Dore. He served as customary chief of La Conception and was a practicing Catholic throughout his life.

In 1946, following the abolition of the code de l'indigénat (the discriminatory legal code previously governing Indigenous subjects in French colonies), Pidjot entered politics by founding the Union des indigènes calédoniens amis de la liberté dans l'ordre (UICALO), an organization advocating for Kanak civil rights on a Catholic basis. He subsequently supported the 1951 candidacy of pharmacist Maurice Lenormand for the National Assembly.

== Rise in territorial politics ==
In 1953, Pidjot helped organize electoral lists under the name Union Calédonienne in support of Lenormand, winning 15 of 25 seats on the territorial general council and marking the first entry of Melanesians, including Pidjot himself, into New Caledonia's local assembly. When the Union Calédonienne formally organized as a political party in 1956, Pidjot became its president.

Following the 1956 Loi-cadre Defferre, which granted greater autonomy to French overseas territories, all Kanaks gained full French citizenship and universal suffrage in 1957. Pidjot was elected to the Territorial Assembly of New Caledonia continuously from 1957 to 1979, serving as its president from 1976 to 1977. During part of this period he also held ministerial roles in the territory's government council, including Minister of Rural Economy (1957–1960) and later vice-president of the government council (1962–1964), with responsibility for finance and economic affairs.

=== National Assembly career ===
In 1964, Pidjot succeeded Maurice Lenormand as deputy after Lenormand was ruled ineligible following a criminal conviction; Pidjot won a special election with 54 percent of the vote. He became the first Kanak elected to the French Parliament. He was reelected continuously until 1986. During his tenure, he sat with several centrist, non-Gaullist parliamentary groups, and opposed reforms by the French government that reduced the territory's autonomy, including the 1963 Jacquinot laws and the 1969 Billotte laws.

== Shift toward independence ==
Pidjot's opposition to centralizing measures by the French state moved him increasingly toward support for New Caledonian independence. In June 1976, he stated that "New Caledonia is still awaiting its decolonization." At the Union Calédonienne's 1977 congress in Bourail, the party formally adopted a pro-independence platform, a shift associated with a newer generation of leaders including Jean-Marie Tjibaou.

Pidjot was reelected in 1978 to represent New Caledonia's newly created 1st constituency. He initially sat as a non-affiliated deputy before becoming associated with the Socialist group in 1981. During the 1980s, including the period of civil conflict in New Caledonia known as les Événements, Pidjot represented Kanak socialist independence positions in the National Assembly while gradually withdrawing from frontline political life. He stepped down as president of the Union Calédonienne in late 1985, succeeded by Jean-Marie Tjibaou, and did not seek reelection in 1986.
