= Caledonian Union =

Caledonian Union Union calédonienne
- Leader: Daniel Goa
- Deputy Leader: Pierre-Chanel Tutugoro
- Founded: January 1953 (de facto) May 13, 1956 (first congress)
- Headquarters: Nouméa
- Ideology: New Caledonian independence Melanesian socialism Christian left Autonomism (until 1977); Anti-imperialism; Left-wing nationalism
- Political position: Centre-left to left-wing
- National affiliation: Democratic and Republican Left group
- Colours: Green
- Seats in the National Assembly: 1 / 2 (50%)
- Seats in the Senate: 1 / 2 (50%)
- Seats in the Congress: 9 / 54 (17%)
- Seats in the South Province: 0 / 40 (0%)
- Seats in the North Province: 9 / 22 (41%)
- Seats in the Loyalty Islands Province: 6 / 14 (43%)

Party flag

Website
- http://unioncaledonienne.com/

The Caledonian Union (French: Union calédonienne, UC) is a pro-independence party and the oldest political party in New Caledonia. In the legislative elections of May 10, 2009, the party won around 11.65% of the popular vote, and 9 out of 54 seats in the Territorial Congress.

== History ==
The Caledonian Union was born as a cross-community (multi-ethnic) autonomist party led by Maurice Lenormand, who was the island's sole representative in the French National Assembly. There, he sat with the Popular Republican Movement, or MRP, and other Christian democratic parties in France. The Caledonian Union did not initially call for the independence of New Caledonia, but instead drew support from all ethnic groups in New Caledonia and campaigned for a greater degree of self-governance and local identity from France under the slogan "Two Colours, One People."

The party's first significant success was on February 8, 1953 with the election of 15 members of the Caledonian Union to the 25 seats General Council.

However, the UC opposed the arrival of Gaullist centralism in France, which undid most of the autonomist reforms of the French Fourth Republic (the Defferre laws). The UC grew more and more radical, and started flirting with independence, which eventually led to an outflow of the Caldoche members of the Caledonian Union to new loyalist parties, such as the Rally for Caledonia in the Republic. Combined with corruption scandals, this weakened the party considerably.

In 1977 in Bourail, the UC adopted a nationalist platform that changed the party's ideology from autonomism to full independence from France. This shift was supported by Jean-Marie Tjibaou and the rare European pro-separatists, such as Maurice Lenormand and Pierre Declercq. In 1979, the UC joined with the Party of Kanak Liberation (Palika) and other parties to form the Nationalist Front, which became the Kanak and Socialist National Liberation Front (FLNKS) in 1984.

The UC was the largest faction in the FLNKS, led by Tjibaou. It was largely moderate, as opposed to the more radical Palika. Tjibaou was killed in 1989 by an extremist Kanak nationalist. In 2001, Roch Wamytan, the moderate leader of the UC, lost an election to Pascal Naouna, a radical. The UC has since broken with Palika within the FLNKS, which has no unitary president and is very divided. Charles Pidjot, Roch Pidjot's nephew, replaced Naouna in 2007. He died in 2012 and was replaced by Daniel Goa.

In the 2009 provincial elections, the party won 9 seats in the Congress of New Caledonia and around 11.65% of the vote. However, in the South Province, the UC ran on a common slate with Palika and won one of the four seats won by that list.

The UC controls the provincial presidency of the Loyalty Islands.

== Ideology ==
The UC favour the concept of independence-association similar to the Marshall Islands. However, the UC has taken a radical stance in favour of strict adherence to the terms of the Nouméa Accord, no talks with the loyalists. For example, the UC boycotted the visit of Jacques Chirac to the island in 2003.
